= List of New York University faculty =

Following is a partial list of notable faculty (either past, present or visiting) of New York University. As of 2014, among NYU's past and present faculty, there are at least 159 Guggenheim Fellows, seven Lasker Award winners, and 200 elected to the American Academy of Arts and Sciences.

== Nobel laureates ==
Name	Relation to NYU	Notability	Reference
Robert Aumann	Oskar Morgenstern professor, 1997	2005 Bank of Sweden Prize in Economics	
Saul Bellow	professor	1976 Nobel Prize in Literature	
Baruj Benacerraf	professor 1956–1968	1980 Nobel Prize in Physiology or Medicine	
Joseph Brodsky	fellow, New York Institute for the Humanities	1987 Nobel Prize in Literature	
Robert F. Engle	professor 1999–	2003 Bank of Sweden Prize in Economics	
Rudolf Eucken	lecturer 1913–1914	1908 Nobel Prize in Literature	
James Heckman	associate adjunct professor 1972	2000 Bank of Sweden Prize in Economics	
Avram Hershko	adjunct professor 1998–	2004 Nobel Prize in Chemistry	
Eric R. Kandel	MED 1955, M.D.; Associate Professor 1965–74	2000 Nobel Prize in Physiology or Medicine	
Tjalling Koopmans	professor, 1940	1975 Bank of Sweden Prize in Economics	
Wassily Leontief	professor 1975–1999	1973 Bank of Sweden Prize in Economics	
Otto Loewi	professor 1940–1961	1936 Nobel Prize in Physiology or Medicine	
Rudolph Marcus	professor 1946–1952, NYU Tandon School of Engineering, 1960–1961, NYU Courant Institute	1992 Nobel Prize in Chemistry	
Robert S. Mulliken	professor 1926–1928	1966 Nobel Prize in Chemistry	
Gunnar Myrdal	visiting professor	1974 Bank of Sweden Prize in Economics	
Severo Ochoa	professor 1942–1974	1959 Nobel Prize in Physiology or Medicine	
Edmund Phelps	professor 1978–1979	2006 Bank of Sweden Prize in Economics	
Edward C. Prescott	Shinsei visiting professor 2005–	2004 Bank of Sweden Prize in Economics	
Paul Romer	professor 2010–2024	2018 Bank of Sweden Prize in Economics	
Paul A. Samuelson	visiting professor	1970 Bank of Sweden Prize in Economics	
Thomas Sargent	professor 2002–	2011 Bank of Sweden Prize in Economics	
Wole Soyinka	Scholar-in-Residence	1986 Nobel Prize in Literature	
Michael Spence	professor 2010–	2001 Bank of Sweden Prize in Economics	

- Nobel laureates Daniel Kahneman, Myron Scholes and Robert A. Mundell gave lectures at New York University Tandon School of Engineering as part of the NYU Tandon School of Engineering Lynford Lecture Series.

== American Academy of Arts and Sciences ==
- Susan C. Antón, professor at the College of Arts and Science
- K. Anthony Appiah, professor at Graduate School of Arts and Science
- Rachel E. Barkow, professor at School of Law
- Gérard Ben Arous, professor at Courant
- Thomas Bender, professor emeritus at Graduate School of Arts and Science
- Marsha Berger, professor at Courant
- John Brademas, president emeritus
- Bruce Bueno de Mesquita, professor at Graduate School of Arts and Science
- Jeff Cheeger, professor at Courant
- Percy Deift, professor at Courant
- Paul DiMaggio, professor at Graduate School of Arts and Science
- George W. Downs, professor at Graduate School of Arts and Science
- Paula England, professor at Graduate School of Arts and Science
- Miranda Fricker, professor at Graduate School of Arts and Science
- David W. Garland, professor at Graduate School of Arts and Science
- Linda Gordon, professor at Graduate School of Arts and Science
- Leslie Greengard, professor at Courant, Tandon School of Engineering
- Jonathan Haidt, professor at Stern School of Business
- Andrew D. Hamilton, president emeritus, professor at Graduate School of Arts and Science
- Russell Hardin, professor at Graduate School of Arts and Science
- Stephen Taylor Holmes, professor at Graduate School of Arts and Science
- Jennifer Homans, professor at Graduate School of Arts and Science
- Michael Hout, professor at Graduate School of Arts and Science
- Perri Klass, professor at Graduate School of Arts and Science
- Yusef Komunyakaa, professor at Graduate School of Arts and Science
- Steven Koonin, professor at Tandon School of Engineering
- Peter Lax, professor at Courant
- Fang-Hua Lin, professor at Courant
- Beatrice Longuenesse, professor at Graduate School of Arts and Science
- Rudolph Marcus, professor at Tandon School of Engineering
- James McBride, professor at Graduate School of Arts and Science
- Henry McKean, professor at Courant
- Cathleen Morawetz, professor at Courant
- Trevor Morrison, professor at School of Law
- Samuel Morse, professor at Tandon School of Engineering, Graduate School of Arts and Science
- Fred Moten, professor at Tisch School
- Charles Newman, professor at Courant
- Louis Nirenberg, professor at Courant
- Charles Peskin, professor at Courant
- Adam Przeworski, professor at Graduate School of Arts and Science
- Claudia Rankine, professor at Graduate School of Arts and Science
- Debraj Ray, professor at Graduate School of Arts and Science
- Renato Rosaldo, professor emeritus at Graduate School of Arts and Science
- Eero Simoncelli, professor at Graduate School of Arts and Science
- K. R. Sreenivasan, professor at Courant, Tandon School of Engineering, Graduate School of Arts and Science
- David Stasavage, professor at Graduate School of Arts and Science
- Thomas J. Sugrue, professor at Graduate School of Arts and Science
- Jeremy Waldron, professor at Graduate School of Arts and Science
- Barbara Weinstein, professor at Graduate School of Arts and Science
- Deborah Willis, professor at Graduate School of Arts and Science and Tisch School
- Margaret Wright, professor at Courant
- Lai-Sang Young, professor at Courant

== Members of the National Academy of Sciences ==
- Marsha Berger, professor at Courant
- George Bugliarello, professor at Tandon School of Engineering
- Jeff Cheeger, professor at Courant
- Gloria M. Coruzzi, professor at NYU
- Percy Deift, professor at Courant
- Claude Desplan, professor at NYU
- Paul M. Doty, professor at Tandon School of Engineering
- Leslie Greengard, professor at Courant, Tandon School of Engineering
- Mikhael Gromov, professor at Courant
- David Harker, professor at Tandon School of Engineering
- Peter Lax, professor at Courant
- Andrew Majda, professor at Courant
- Rudolph Marcus, professor at Tandon School of Engineering
- Henry McKean, professor at Courant
- Elliott Waters Montroll, professor at Tandon School of Engineering
- Cathleen Morawetz, professor at Courant
- Charles Newman, professor at Courant
- Louis Nirenberg, professor at Courant
- Charles Peskin, professor at Courant
- K. R. Sreenivasan, professor at Courant, Tandon School of Engineering
- S.R. Srinivasa Varadhan, professor at Courant
- Margaret Wright, professor at Courant

== Members of the National Academy of Engineering ==
- Henrik Ager-Hanssen, professor at Tandon School of Engineering
- Marsha Berger, professor at Courant
- George Bugliarello, professor at Tandon School of Engineering
- Antonio Ferri, professor at Tandon School of Engineering
- Leslie Greengard, professor at Courant, Tandon School of Engineering
- Nicholas J. Hoff, professor at Tandon School of Engineering
- Paul Horn, professor at Courant, Tandon School of Engineering
- Nathan Marcuvitz, professor at Tandon School of Engineering
- Tsuneo Nakahara, professor at Tandon School of Engineering
- K. R. Sreenivasan, professor at Courant, Tandon School of Engineering
- Jerome Swartz, professor at Tandon School of Engineering
- Ernst Weber, professor at Tandon School of Engineering; first president of the IEEE; a founder of the U.S. NAE
- Jack Wolf, professor at Tandon School of Engineering
- Margaret Wright, professor at Courant
- Dante C. Youla, professor at Tandon School of Engineering

== Guggenheim Fellows ==
Name	Relation to NYU	Notability	Reference
Thomas A. Abercrombie	professor, NYU Graduate School of Arts and Science	Guggenheim Fellow	
Jeff Cheeger	professor, NYU Courant Institute	Guggenheim Fellow	
Percy Deift	professor, NYU Courant Institute	Guggenheim Fellow	
Paul M. Doty	professor at NYU Tandon School of Engineering	Guggenheim Fellow	
Paul Peter Ewald	professor at NYU Tandon School of Engineering	Guggenheim Fellow	
Leopold B. Felsen	professor at NYU Tandon School of Engineering	Guggenheim Fellow	
Herbert Freeman	professor at NYU Tandon School of Engineering	Guggenheim Fellow	
Alexander R. Galloway	professor, NYU Graduate School of Arts and Science	Guggenheim Fellow	
Eugene Genovese	professor at NYU Tandon School of Engineering	Guggenheim Fellow	
Mark L. Gertler	professor, NYU Graduate School of Arts and Science	Guggenheim Fellow	
Rebecca Goldstein	professor, NYU Graduate School of Arts and Science	Guggenheim Fellow	
Michael Heidelberger	professor 1964–1991, NYU School of Medicine	received the Guggenheim Fellowship in 1934 and 1936	
Nicholas J. Hoff	professor at NYU Tandon School of Engineering	Guggenheim Fellow	
Paul Horwich	professor, NYU Graduate School of Arts and Science	Guggenheim Fellow	
Frances Kamm	professor, NYU Graduate School of Arts and Science	Guggenheim Fellow	
Joseph Wood Krutch	professor at NYU Tandon School of Engineering	Guggenheim Fellow	
Elliott Waters Montroll	professor at NYU Tandon School of Engineering	Guggenheim Fellow	
Krishna Palem	professor, NYU Courant Institute	Guggenheim Fellow	
David J. Pine	professor at NYU Tandon School of Engineering	Guggenheim Fellow	
Michael Purugganan	professor at NYU Graduate School of Arts and Science	Guggenheim Fellow (2006)	
Kristin Ross	professor, NYU Graduate School of Arts and Science	Guggenheim Fellow	
K. R. Sreenivasan	professor at NYU Courant Institute and NYU Tandon School of Engineering	Guggenheim Fellow	
Darin Strauss	professor, NYU Graduate School of Arts and Science	Guggenheim Fellow; winner of National Book Critics Circle Award	
Richard Aaker Trythall	professor at NYU Florence	Guggenheim Fellow (1967)	
Jack Wolf	professor 1963–1965, NYU Courant Institute, 1965–1973, NYU Tandon School of Engineering	Guggenheim Fellow (1979)	
Lai-Sang Young	professor, NYU Courant Institute	Guggenheim Fellow	

- Sylvain Cappell, professor at Courant
- Steve Childress, professor at Courant
- Richard J. Cole, professor at Courant
- Sue de Beer, professor at Steinhardt
- Troy Duster, professor at Graduate School of Arts and Science
- Kathleen Gerson, professor at College of Arts and Science
- Lyle Ashton Harris, professor at Steinhardt
- Deborah Landau professor at College of Arts and Science
- Cathleen Morawetz, professor at Courant
- Charles Newman, professor at Courant
- Louis Nirenberg, professor at Courant
- Amanda Petrusich, professor at Gallatin School of Individualized Study
- Debraj Ray, professor at College School of Arts and Science
- Andrew Ross, professor at Graduate School of Arts and Science
- Anna Deavere Smith, professor at Tisch
- Irwin Unger, professor at Graduate School of Arts and Science, won the Pulitzer Prize for History in 1965

== MacArthur Fellows ==
Name	Relation to NYU	Notability	Reference
Anthony G. Amsterdam	professor of Law	1989 MacArthur Fellow	
Harold Bloom	Berg Professor of English	1985 MacArthur Fellow	
Gregory Chudnovsky	professor of Mathematics	1986 MacArthur Fellow	
Joan Breton Connelly	professor of Art History	1996 MacArthur Fellow	
Nicole Fleetwood	professor of Media, Culture and Communication	2021 MacArthur Fellow	
Faye D. Ginsburg	professor of Anthropology	1994 MacArthur Fellow	
Terrance Hayes	professor of Creative Writing	2014 MacArthur Fellow	
Fritz John	professor of Mathematics	1984 MacArthur Fellow	
Subhash Khot	professor at Courant Institute of Mathematical Sciences	2014 MacArthur Fellow	
Galway Kinnell	professor of Creative Writing	1984 MacArthur Fellow	
Sylvia A. Law	professor of Law, Medicine, and Psychiatry	1983 MacArthur Fellow	
David Levering Lewis	professor of History	1999 MacArthur Fellow	
Julie Livingston	professor of Social and Cultural Analysis and History	2013 MacArthur Fellow	
Ruth Watson Lubic	adjunct professor	1993 MacArthur Fellow	
Paule Marshall	professor of English	1992 MacArthur Fellow	
Deborah Meier	research scholar, Steinhardt	1987 MacArthur Fellow	
Fred Moten	professor of Performance Studies and Comparative Literature	2020 MacArthur Fellow	
George Perle	GSAS 1956, PhD; professor of music	1974 MacArthur Fellow	
Charles S. Peskin	professor of Mathematics	1983 MacArthur Fellow	
Claudia Rankine	professor of Creative Writing	2016 MacArthur Fellow	
Robert Shapley	professor of Neurology	1986 MacArthur Fellow	
Anna Deavere Smith	professor of Performance Studies	1996 MacArthur Fellow	
Bryan Stevenson	professor of Law	1995 MacArthur Fellow	
Deborah Willis	professor of Photography and Social and Cultural Analysis	2000 MacArthur Fellow	
Julia Wolfe	professor at Steinhardt School of Culture, Education, and Human Development	2016 MacArthur Fellow	
Rita P. Wright	professor of Anthropology	1988 MacArthur Fellow	
Horng-Tzer Yau	professor of Mathematics	2000 MacArthur Fellow	

== Rhodes Scholars ==
- John Brademas, professor at Graduate School of Arts and Science
- Sujit Choudhry, professor at School of Law; dean of the UC Berkeley School of Law; associate dean of the University of Toronto
- Peter Blair Henry, professor at Stern School of Business
- James McNaughton Hester, former professor and dean of both undergraduate and graduate schools of arts and science at NYU; 11th president of NYU

== National Medals for Science, Technology and Innovation, Arts and Humanities recipients ==
Name	Relation to NYU	Notability	Reference
Gregory Breit	professor at NYU Graduate School of Arts and Science	1967 National Medal of Science recipient	
Bernard Brodie	professor at NYU Graduate School of Arts and Science	1968 National Medal of Science recipient	
W. Edwards Deming	professor	1987 National Medal of Technology recipient	
Zelda Fichandler	professor at NYU Tisch School of the Arts	1996 National Medal of Arts recipient	
Kurt O. Friedrichs	professor 1938–1974 at NYU Courant Institute	1976 National Medal of Science recipient	
Rebecca Goldstein	professor at NYU Graduate School of Arts and Science	2015 National Humanities Medal recipient	
Michael Heidelberger	professor 1964–1991 at NYU School of Medicine	1967 National Medal of Science recipient	
Joseph Keller	professor at NYU Courant Institute	1988 National Medal of Science recipient	
Peter Lax	professor at NYU Courant Institute	1986 National Medal of Science recipient	
Rudolph A. Marcus	professor at NYU Tandon School of Engineering	1989 National Medal of Science recipient	
Herman Francis Mark	professor at NYU Tandon School of Engineering	1979 National Medal of Science recipient	
James McBride	professor at NYU Graduate School of Arts and Science	2016 National Humanities Medal recipient	
Cathleen Synge Morawetz	professor at NYU Courant Institute	1998 National Medal of Science recipient	
Louis Nirenberg	professor at NYU Courant Institute	1995 National Medal of Science recipient	
Severo Ochoa	professor 1942–1974 at NYU School of Medicine	1979 National Medal of Science recipient	
Anna Deavere Smith	professor at NYU Tisch School of the Arts	2013 National Humanities Medal recipient	
Jerome Swartz	professor at NYU Tandon School of Engineering	1999 National Medal of Technology recipient	
S. R. Srinivasa Varadhan	professor at NYU Courant Institute	2010 National Medal of Science recipient	
Ernst Weber	professor at NYU Tandon School of Engineering	1987 National Medal of Science recipient	

== Abel Prize recipients ==
- Mikhail Leonidovich Gromov, professor at Courant
- Peter Lax, professor at Courant
- Louis Nirenberg, professor at Courant
- S.R. Srinivasa Varadhan, professor at Courant

== College of Arts and Science (undergraduate and graduate) ==
William Barrett	philosopher	professor	
Saul Bellow	writer	professor	1976 Nobel Prize in Literature
Harold Bloom	literary critic	Berg Professor of English	1985 MacArthur Fellow
Faye D. Ginsburg	scholar	professor of Anthropology	1994 MacArthur Fellow
Galway Kinnell	poet	professor	1982 Pulitzer Prize for Poetry
Wassily Leontief	economist	professor 1975–1999	1973 Nobel Prize in Economics
Otto Loewi	pharmacologist	professor 1940–1961	1936 Nobel Prize in Physiology or Medicine
Ruth Watson Lubic	scholar	adjunct professor	1993 MacArthur Fellow
Paule Marshall	writer	professor of English	1992 MacArthur Fellow
Suketu Mehta	associate professor, current, journalism	writer, Maximum City	
Robert S. Mulliken	physicist, chemist	professor 1926–1928	1966 Nobel Prize in Chemistry
Richard Aaker Trythall	professor, music theory	composer, pianist	
Rita P. Wright	scholar	professor of Anthropology	1988 MacArthur Fellow

- Jane M. Carlton, professor of Biology, recipient of the 2010 Stoll-Stunkard Memorial Lectureship Award, 2012 fellow of the American Association for the Advancement of Science
- Dan Fagin, science journalist, recipient of the 2014 Pulitzer Prize for General Nonfiction for his book Toms River
- Leonard Gale, chemist who helped Samuel Morse develop the electromagnetic telegraph
- David G. Grier, physicist, best known for his work on the tractor beam
- Margo Jefferson, writer, critic, recipient of the 1995 Pulitzer Prize for criticism; taught journalism 1979–1983, 1989–1991
- Kirsten Johnson, filmmaker
- Julia Jones-Pugliese (1909–1993), national champion fencer and fencing coach
- James McBride, recipient of the 2013 National Book Award for fiction for his novel The Good Lord Bird
- Lawrence Amos McLouth, professor of Germanic Studies
- Nickolas Muray (born Miklós Mandl; 1892–1965), Hungarian-born American photographer and Olympic fencer
- Elisha Netanyahu, mathematician, former dean of the Faculty of Sciences at Technion; uncle of Benjamin Netanyahu, prime minister of Israel
- Joel Westheimer, professor of citizenship education at the University of Ottawa

== Tandon School of Engineering (formerly Polytechnic School of Engineering) ==
- Henrik Ager-Hanssen, Norwegian nuclear physicist
- Stephen Arnold, physicist, helped create the interdisciplinary field of microsphere photonics
- Boris Aronov, computer scientist, Sloan Research Fellow
- Dan Bailey, physicist, fly-shop owner, innovative fly developer
- Barouh Berkovits, invented the cardiac defibrillator and artificial cardiac pacemaker
- George Bugliarello, chairman of the Board of Science and Technology for International Development of the National Academy of Sciences; of the National Medal of Technology Nomination Evaluation Committee; and of the National Academy of Engineering Council's International Affairs Committee
- Charles Camarda, engineer and NASA astronaut
- Justin Cappos, computer scientist
- Ju-Chin Chu, chemical engineer and father of Steven Chu; became an Academia Sinica member in 1964
- David and Gregory Chudnovsky, mathematicians who held the record for number of digits of pi in 1989; now run the Institute for Mathematics and Advanced Supercomputing at Polytechnic
- Francis Crick, co-discoverer of DNA structure; awarded Nobel Prize for Physiology or Medicine
- Paul M. Doty, emeritus Harvard Mallinckrodt Professor of Biochemistry; specialized in the physical properties of macromolecules; involved in peace and security policy issues
- R. Luke DuBois, composer, performer, conceptual new media artist, programmer, record producer, pedagogue
- Paul Peter Ewald, inventor of X-ray diffraction method for determination of molecular structure; Physics Department chair until 1957
- Leopold B. Felsen, physicist
- Antonio Ferri, leader of a team that created the first practical hypersonic tunnel heater, used to heat air for discharge into a wind tunnel
- R. M. Foster, Bell Labs mathematician whose work was of significance regarding electronic filters for use on telephone lines
- Herbert Freeman, computer scientist
- Eugene D. Genovese, historian of the American South and slavery
- Gordon Gould, former Polytechnic professor; inventor of the laser
- Mark M. Green, chemist
- Leslie Greengard, mathematician, physician and computer scientist; co-inventor of the fast multipole method in 1987
- S. L. Greitzer, mathematician; founding chairman of the US Mathematical Olympiad; publisher of the pre-college mathematics journal Arbelos
- Heinrich Guggenheimer, mathematician
- Nikhil Gupta
- Charles William Hanko, historian and politician
- David Harker, physicist; X-ray crystallographer; discoverer of the Donnay–Harker law and Harker–Kasper inequalities
- Nicholas J. Hoff, engineer specializing in aeronautics and astronautics; his calculations became the international guideposts in aircraft design
- Paul Horn
- Jerry MacArthur Hultin, former United States under secretary of the Navy
- Katherine Isbister, game and human computer interaction researcher and designer
- Myles Jackson, Albert Gallatin Research Excellence Professor of the History of Science
- Andrew Kalotay, finance professor, Wall Street quant and chess master
- Maurice Karnaugh, inventor of Karnaugh maps (K-maps) while at Bell Labs; professor at the Westchester campus 1980–1999; retired
- Ramesh Karri, researcher specializing in trustworthy hardware, high assurance nanoscale integrated circuits, architectures and systems; has won numerous best-paper awards from ACM, USENIX, and the IEEE
- Edward Kimbark, power engineer
- Parke Kolbe, author
- Steven E. Koonin, theoretical physicist, former faculty and provost of California Institute of Technology
- Joseph Wood Krutch, writer, critic, and naturalist
- Erich E. Kunhardt, physicist
- Yann LeCun, computer scientist
- David Lefer, journalist and author
- Paul Levinson, author of The Plot To Save Socrates; media commentator on The O'Reilly Factor; visiting professor at the Philosophy and Technology Study Center at Polytechnic, 1987–1988
- Seymour Lipschutz, mathematician
- Frederick B. Llewellyn, electrical engineer
- Erwin Lutwak, mathematician
- Rudolph Marcus, former Polytechnic professor; Wolf Prize in Chemistry, Nobel Prize in Chemistry and National Medal of Science winner
- Nathan Marcuvitz, electrical engineering pioneer
- Herman F. Mark, founder of the Polymer Research Institute; National Medal of Science winner.
- Warren L. McCabe, chemical engineer and is considered as one of the founding fathers of the profession of chemical engineering
- Jim McDonald, fellow of the Royal Academy of Engineering; principal and vice-chancellor of the University of Strathclyde
- Nasir Memon, computer scientist, IEEE Fellow
- David Miller, served as an advisor on urban issues at the World Bank; 63rd mayor of Toronto
- Elliott Waters Montroll, scientist and mathematician
- Samuel Morse, co-inventor of the Morse code; contributor to the invention of a single-wire telegraph system based on European telegraphs
- James H. Mulligan Jr., namesake of IEEE James H. Mulligan, Jr. Education Medal
- Tsuneo Nakahara, communications engineer
- Carl Neuberg, early pioneer in biochemistry, the "father of modern biochemistry"
- Beth Simone Noveck, United States deputy chief technology officer for open government
- Donald Othmer, co-author of Kirk–Othmer Encyclopedia of Chemical Technology; inventor of the Othmer Still, a laboratory device for vapor-liquid equilibrium measurements
- Charles G. Overberger, chemist
- Athanasios Papoulis, pioneer in the field of stochastic processes
- Leonard Peikoff, former philosophy professor; founder of the Ayn Rand Institute
- David J. Pine, physicist
- Maurizio Porfiri, Italian electrical engineer, noted for his work with robotic fish.
- John R. Ragazzini, electrical engineer
- Richard W. Rahn, economist
- Theodore Rappaport, electrical engineer
- John Howard Raymond, philosopher
- Hans Reissner, German aeronautical engineer
- Sal Restivo, sociologist/anthropologist; founding director of the Ph.D program in Science and Technology Studies at Rensselaer Polytechnic Institute
- Murray Rothbard, former economics professor; key figure in libertarian movement
- Tony Rothman, theoretical physicist
- Michael Shelley, professor of Mechanical Engineering
- Joshua W. Sill, professor of Mathematics; became the youngest General in the Civil War; namesake of Fort Sill
- Aleksandra Smiljanić, minister of Telecommunications and Information Technologies in the Government of Serbia
- Joel B. Snyder, IEEE president
- K. R. Sreenivasan, engineer whose research includes physics and applied mathematics.
- Torsten Suel, pioneer of search engine algorithms
- Jerome Swartz, developed early optical strategies for barcode scanning technologies
- Nassim Nicholas Taleb, epistemologist author of The Black Swan; works in the risk engineering department
- James Tenney, composer; music theorist
- Julian Togelius, AI and games researcher
- John G. Truxal, control theorist
- Harlan K. Ullman, principal author of the doctrine of "shock and awe"
- Ernst Weber, founder of the Microwave Research Institute; first IEEE president; National Medal of Science winner
- Jack Keil Wolf, researcher in information theory and coding theory
- Ta-You Wu, nuclear physicist; president of Academia Sinica
- Dante C. Youla, namesake of Youla–Kucera parametrization in control theory
- Louis Zukofsky, second-generation American modernist poet

== Courant Institute of Mathematical Sciences ==
This is a small selection of Courant's notable faculty over the years and a few of their distinctions:

- Gérard Ben Arous, Davidson Prize
- Marsha Berger, NASA Software of the Year, National Academy of Engineering, National Academy of Sciences
- Fedor Bogomolov
- Richard Bonneau
- Luis Caffarelli, Wolf Prize
- Sylvain Cappell, Guggenheim Fellowship
- Sourav Chatterjee, Davidson Prize
- Jeff Cheeger, Veblen Prize, Guggenheim Fellowship, Max Planck Research Prize
- Steven Childress, Guggenheim Fellowship, American Physical Society fellow
- Demetrios Christodoulou, 1993 MacArthur Fellow
- Richard J. Cole, Guggenheim Fellowship
- Adrian Constantin, Romanian-Austrian mathematician, Wittgenstein Award
- Martin Davis, Steele Prize
- Percy Deift, George Pólya Prize, Guggenheim Fellowship, National Academy of Sciences, American Academy of Arts and Science
- Robert Dewar, IFIP WG 2.1 member, chairperson 1978–1983; Courant Institute associate director 1994–1997, GNAT cocreator, AdaCore co-founder, president, CEO
- Kurt O. Friedrichs, 1976 National Medal of Science
- Paul Garabedian, NAS Prize in Applied Mathematics, National Academy of Sciences, American Academy of Arts and Science
- Leslie Greengard, Steele Prize, Packard Foundation Fellowship, NSF Presidential Young Investigator, National Academy of Engineering, National Academy of Sciences
- Mikhail Gromov, 2009 Abel Prize, Wolf Prize, Steele Prize, Kyoto Prize, Balzan Prize
- Larry Guth
- Helmut Hofer, Ostrowski Prize, National Academy of Sciences
- Fritz John, 1984 MacArthur Fellow
- Joseph B. Keller, 1988 National Medal of Science, Wolf Prize
- Michel Kervaire
- Subhash Khot, 2010 Alan T. Waterman Award
- Morris Kline
- Peter Lax, Abel Prize winner, 1986 National Medal of Science, Steele Prize, Wolf Prize, Norbert Wiener Prize
- Lin Fanghua, Bôcher Memorial Prize, American Academy of Arts and Science
- Wilhelm Magnus
- Andrew Majda, NAS Prize in Applied Mathematics, John von Neumann Prize (SIAM)
- Henry McKean, National Academy of Science, American Academy of Arts and Science
- Bud Mishra, Association for Computing Machinery fellow
- Cathleen Synge Morawetz, 1998 National Medal of Science, Steele Prize, Birkhoff Prize, Noether Lecturer, National Academy of Sciences, American Academy of Arts and Science
- Jürgen Moser, Wolf Prize, James Craig Watson Medal
- Assaf Naor, European Mathematical Society Prize, Packard Fellowship, Salem Prize, Bôcher Memorial Prize, Blavatnik Award
- Charles Newman, National Academy of Science, American Academy of Arts and Science
- Louis Nirenberg, 1995 Crafoord Prize, National Medal of Science, Steele Prize, Bôcher Memorial Prize, Chern Medal, National Academy of Sciences, American Academy of Arts and Science
- Amnon Pazy (1936–2006), Israeli mathematician; President of the Hebrew University of Jerusalem
- Charles S. Peskin, 1983 MacArthur Fellow, Birkhoff Prize, National Medal of Science
- Amir Pnueli, National Academy of Engineering, Israel Prize, Turing Award, Association for Computing Machinery fellow
- Peter Sarnak
- Jack Schwartz, developed the programming language SETL at NYU
- Michael J. Shelley, American Physical Society fellow, François Naftali Frenkiel Award (APS)
- Victor Shoup, with Ronald Cramer developed the Cramer–Shoup cryptosystem
- Joel Spencer
- K. R. Sreenivasan
- S. R. Srinivasa Varadhan, Abel Prize winner, Steele Prize, National Academy of Sciences, American Academy of Arts and Science, fellow of the Royal Society, National Medal of Science
- Daniel Stein, fellow of the American Physical Society, fellow of the American Association for the Advancement of Science
- Akshay Venkatesh, Salem Prize, Packard Fellowship
- Hong Wang, Maryam Mirzakhani New Frontiers Prize (2022), Salem Prize (2025), Ostrowski Prize (2025), Sadosky Prize (2026), Clay Research Award (2026), New Horizons in Mathematics Prize (2026)
- Olof B. Widlund
- Margaret H. Wright, National Academy of Science, National Academy of Engineering
- Lai-Sang Young, Satter Prize, Guggenheim Fellowship, American Academy of Arts and Science

== Stern School of Business ==
Name	Relation to NYU	Notability	Reference
Jennifer N. Carpenter	professor, current	associate professor of Finance	
Aswath Damodaran	professor, current	Kerschner Family Chair in Finance Education	
Ed Elton	professor, current	Nomura Professor of Finance; Academic Director of Stern Doctoral Program	
Ken Froewiss	professor, current	clinical professor of Finance and Academic Director of Executive Programs	
Dan Gode	professor, current	clinical associate professor of Accounting	
Jonathan Haidt	professor, current	Thomas Cooley Professor of Ethical Leadership	
Peter Blair Henry	professor, current	dean, NYU Stern; Dean Richard R. West Professorship in Business; William R. Berkley Professor of Economics & Finance	
Ernest Kurnow	professor, late chairman	Business Statistics professor; on NYU faculty since 1948	
Alexander Ljungqvist	professor, current	research professor of Finance; Ira Rennert Professor of Entrepreneurship; research director, Berkley Center	
Sonia Marciano	professor, current	clinical associate professor of Management and Organizations	
Michael Posner	professor, current	professor of Business and Society	
Thomas Pugel	professor, current	vice dean of Executive Programs; professor of Economics and Global Business	
Nouriel Roubini	professor, current	professor of Economics and International Business	
Thomas Sargent	professor, current	William R. Berkley Professor of Economics and Business	
Anthony Saunders	professor, current	John M. Schiff Professor of Finance	
Michael Spence	professor, current	William R. Berkley Professor in Economics & Business	
Raghu Sundaram	professor, current	professor of Finance; Yamaichi Faculty fellow	
Arun Sundararajan	professor, current	professor of Information, Operations and Management Sciences; NEC Faculty Fellow	
Richard Sylla	professor, current	History of Financial Institutions and Markets professor	
Lawrence J. White	professor, current	Robert Kavesh Professor of Economics	
Eitan Zemel	professor, current	vice dean for Strategic Initiatives and the W. Edwards Deming Professor of Quality and Productivity	
Larry Zicklin	professor, current	clinical professor at Stern; Neuberger Berman's chairman of the board	

== Tisch School of the Arts ==
Name	Relation to NYU	Notability	Reference
James Franco	taught film	Academy Award-nominated actor	
D. B. Gilles	teaches screenwriting	four plays published by Dramatists Play Service	
Marketa Kimbrell	taught directing and acting	taught film directing and acting 1970–2006; founder of the New York Street Theater Caravan	
Susan Sandler	Teaches screenwriting and directing	wrote plays and screenplays including Crossing Delancey	

== Gallatin School of Individualized Study ==
- Sinan Antoon, Iraqi novelist and poet
- Taylor Antrim, novelist and journalist
- Myles Jackson, historian of Science and Technology
- Mitchell Joachim, sustainable design, TED senior fellow
- Frank Leon Roberts, writer, commentator, activist
- John Sexton, president of NYU, teaches the seminar "Baseball as a Road to God"
- E. Frances White, former dean, historian of Africa, African American Studies

== Steinhardt School of Culture, Education, and Human Development ==
- Richard Arum, sociologist of education
- Roscoe Brown, education professor, one of the Tuskegee Airmen
- Meg Bussert, actress, singer, music theatre professor
- Eduardus Halim, pianist, professor, inaugural holder of the Sascha Gorodnitzki Chair in Piano Studies at NYU
- Martha Hill, dance instructor and director of NYU's Dance Education program
- James Weldon Johnson, author, civil rights activist, educator, lawyer, songwriter, diplomat
- Frank Kimbrough, jazz pianist
- sj Miller, deputy director of Educational Equity
- Marion Nestle, Paulette Goddard Professor of Nutrition and Food Studies, author, blogger
- Fabio Parasecoli, director of the Food Studies PhD Program
- Neil Postman, education reformer, humanist, social visionary, author, media critic, and creator of the NYU's Department of Media Ecology
- Diane Ravitch, historian of education, educational policy analyst, research professor, and former U.S. assistant secretary of education
- Ron Robin (born 1951), Israeli historian and president of the University of Haifa
- Louise Rosenblatt, author of Literature as Exploration, scholar on the teaching of literature, and director of NYU's doctoral program in English Education
- John Scofield, jazz-rock guitarist and composer
- Stefaan Verhulst, adjunct professor in the Department of Media, Culture, and Communication at NYU; senior associated fellow in the Programme in Comparative Media Law and Policy at Oxford University
- Jacob Weinberg, pianist and composer
- Hale Woodruff, printmaker, muralist, draftsman, painter

== Robert F. Wagner Graduate School of Public Service ==
- Alan Altshuler, Massachusetts secretary of transportation (1972–75)
- Doug Band
- Jorge Castañeda
- Dalton Conley
- Harold Ford Jr.
- Gara LaMarche
- Jacob Lew
- Jonathan Morduch
- Timothy Naftali
- Robert Shrum

== School of Law ==
NYU Law has the second highest number of faculty who are members of the American Academy of Arts and Sciences with 19 inductees, behind only Harvard.

Notable professors include:

- Alberto Alemanno (European Union law)
- William Allen (corporate law, chancellor of Delaware)
- Philip Alston (human rights)
- Anthony Amsterdam (criminal law, capital punishment)
- Kwame Anthony Appiah (legal philosophy)
- Deborah Archer (racial justice, civil rights)
- Rachel Barkow (administrative law, criminal law and procedure)
- Robert Bauer (law and politics, political reform)
- Dorit Beinisch (national security law)
- Jerome A. Cohen (Chinese law)
- Lawrence Collins (transnational litigation)
- Richard Epstein (law and economics, torts, health law & policy)
- Cynthia Estlund (labor law, employment law, property)
- Samuel Estreicher (labor law, employment law, administrative law)
- Tali Farhadian (criminal law)
- Barry Friedman (constitutional law, criminal law)
- David W. Garland (criminal law, sociology)
- Stephen Gillers (legal ethics)
- Douglas H. Ginsburg (administrative law)
- Stephen Holmes (liberal democracy)
- Samuel Issacharoff (procedure, democracy)
- Sally Katzen (administrative law)
- Benedict Kingsbury (international law)
- John Koeltl (constitutional litigation)
- Theodor Meron (international law)
- Arthur R. Miller (civil procedure, copyright, and privacy)
- Trevor Morrison (dean, constitutional law)
- Melissa Erica Murray (constitutional law)
- Thomas Nagel (legal philosophy)
- Burt Neuborne (evidence, Holocaust litigation expert)
- Richard Pildes (constitutional law, election law)
- Richard Revesz (environmental law)
- Samuel Scheffler (legal philosophy)
- John Sexton (civil procedure)
- Catherine Sharkey (tort law, empirical legal studies)
- Linda J. Silberman (conflict of laws, civil procedure, international arbitration)
- Sonia Sotomayor, associate justice of the Supreme Court of the United States
- Bryan Stevenson (criminal law, capital punishment)
- Jeremy Waldron (legal philosophy)
- Joseph H. H. Weiler (international law)
- Joan Wexler (born 1946), dean and president of Brooklyn Law School
- Katrina Wyman (environmental law, property law)
- Kenji Yoshino (constitutional law, LGBT rights)

== Grossman School of Medicine ==
- Martin J. Blaser, Frederick H. King Professor of Internal Medicine; chairman, Department of Medicine; professor of Microbiology
- Jason Walter Brown, neurologist and medical writer
- Matthew Chervenak, president and CEO of General Biologic company
- Enrico Fazzini, D.O., professor of Neurology and expert on Parkinson's disease
- Steven Flanagan, professor and chairman of the Department of Rehabilitation Medicine
- William L. Goldberg, assistant professor and assistant director of Emergency Medicine; author
- Anna Goldfeder, director of the Cancer and Radiobiology Research Laboratory
- Ruben Kuzniecky, professor of Neurology
- Rodolfo Llinas, professor of Physiology and Neuroscience
- Oliver Sacks, professor of Neurology and author
- John E. Sarno, professor of Clinical Rehabilitation Medicine
- Homer Smith (1895–1962), professor and director of the Physiology Laboratories at NYU
- Joseph D. Zuckerman, surgeon-in-chief of the Hospital for Joint Diseases of NYU Langone Medical Center

== Silver School of Social Work ==
- James Jaccard, professor of Social Work

== NYU Abu Dhabi ==
Notable faculty include:

- Kwame Anthony Appiah, professor of Philosophy and Law
- Thomas Bender, professor of History
- Carol Gilligan, visiting professor of Humanities and Applied Psychology
- Elias Khoury, Global Distinguished Professor of Modern Arabic Literature
- Anthony Kronman, Global Professor, New York University Abu Dhabi
- Cyrus Patell, associate dean of Humanities
- Werner Sollors, Global Professor of Literature
- Iván Szelényi, emeritus dean of Social Sciences
- Godfried Toussaint, research professor of Computer Science
- Eugene Trubowitz, Global Professor of Mathematics

== NYU Shanghai ==
- Chen Jian, visiting professor from Cornell University, Chinese history and international relations
- Jeffrey Lehman, former president of Cornell, dean of University of Michigan law school
- Fanghua Lin, associate provost for the Quantitative Disciplines, Silver Professor at the Courant Institute of Mathematical Sciences
- Joanna Waley-Cohen, former head of the NYU New York History department
- Yu Lizhong, former president of East China Normal University
- Eitan Zemel, associate chancellor for Strategy and Dean of Business

== Professor emeriti and other notable faculty ==
Name	Relation to NYU	Notability	Reference
Thomas A. Abercrombie	professor, current	winner of the 2004–2005 Guggenheim Fellowship	
Frances E. Allen	professor	Turing Award winner	
Philip Alston	professor, current	John Norton Pomeroy Professor of Law; the United Nations special rapporteur on Extrajudicial, Summary or Arbitrary executions	
Edward Altman	professor, 1977–	inventor of the "Altman Z-Score"	
Yehuda Amichai	poet-in-residence	awarded the 1969 Brenner Prize, 1976 Bialik Prize, and 1982 Israel Prize	
Awam Amkpa	professor, current; director of NYU's Africana studies	drama professor and professor	
Jacob M. Appel	visiting faculty, current	bioethicist, authority on euthanasia	
Roger S. Bagnall	visiting professor	director of the Institute for the Study of the Ancient World at NYU	
Henry Martyn Baird	B.A. 1850, professor 1859–1906	historian of the Huguenots	
William Baumol	professor	member of National Academy of Sciences	
Saul Bellow	professor	1976 Nobel Prize in Literature	
Baruj Benacerraf	professor 1956–1968	1980 Nobel Prize in Physiology or Medicine	
Marsha Berger	professor	member of National Academy of Sciences	
Ben Bernanke	visiting professor 1993	chairman of the Federal Reserve Board	
Carl Bernstein	professor	1973 Pulitzer Prize (Watergate)	
Alain Bertaud	senior research scolar	former principal urban planner at the World Bank	
Ned Block	professor 1996–	contributed to matters of consciousness and cognitive science	
Alfred Bloom	professor	former president of Swarthmore College	
Paul Boghossian	professor, current	professor of Philosophy	
Richard Bona	professor, current	jazz bassist and composer	
Steven Brams	professor 1969–	known for his research on voting systems and approval voting	
Meredith Broussard	assistant professor, current	assistant professor at Arthur L. Carter Journalism Institute, author of Artificial Unintelligence	
McGeorge Bundy	professor of History (1979–1989)	National Security advisor under John F. Kennedy	
Kenneth Neill Cameron	professor 1963–1975	authority on the poet Percy Bysshe Shelley and the wider circle of English Romantic writers	
John Canemaker	professor, current	Academy Award-winning independent animator, animation historian	
Norman Cantor	professor 1978–2004	medievalist	
Jorge Castañeda Gutman	visiting professor	secretary of state of Mexico	
Domingo Cavallo	guest lecturer	former minister of Finance, Republic of Argentina	
Paul Chaikin	professor, current	physicist	
Herrick Chapman	professor, 1992–	historian of France	
Jeff Cheeger	professor	member of National Academy of Sciences	
Stephen F. Cohen	professor	scholar of history and foreign relations of Russia	
Dalton Conley	professor, current	sociologist	
Joan Breton Connelly	professor, current	classical archaeologist and professor of Classics and Art History at NYU; appointed to the Cultural Property Advisory Committee by President George W. Bush in 2003; awarded MacArthur Fellowship in 1996	
David Copperfield	professor	taught a course on magic at the age of sixteen	
Richard Courant	professor	noted for the development of the finite element method	
Martin Davis	professor emeritus	co-inventor of the Davis–Putnam algorithm and the DPLL algorithms; known for his model of Post–Turing machines	
Bruce Bueno de Mesquita	professor, current	political scientist	
E. L. Doctorow	Professor	author of Ragtime	
Denis Donoghue	professor, current	Irish literary critic; Henry James Chair of English and American Letters at NYU	
Norman Dorsen	professor, current	former president of the American Civil Liberties Union, 1976–1991	
John William Draper	professor, 1840–1881	founder and former president of the Medical School	
Peter F. Drucker	professor, 1950–1972	major contributor to management theory	
Troy Duster	professor, current	sociologist	
Ronald Dworkin	Professor, −2013	clerked for Judge Learned Hand of the United States Court of Appeals for the Second Circuit; winner of the 2007 Holberg International Memorial Prize	
William Easterly	professor 2003–	economist	
Christopher L. Eisgruber	professor	20th and current president of Princeton University	
Robert F. Engle	professor 1999–	2003 Bank of Sweden Prize in Economics	
Niall Ferguson	professor	author of Empire: How Britain Made the Modern World	
Zelda Fichandler	Professor, current	National Medal of Arts winner in 1996; inducted into the American Theater Hall of Fame in 1999	
Hartry Field	professor, current	philosopher	
Kit Fine	professor, current	Silver Professor of Philosophy	
Joel Fink	professor, former	associate dean of Roosevelt University	
Erich Fromm	professor of psychiatry 1962–1974	German-American psychologist and philosopher	
Mark L. Gertler	professor, current	macroeconomist; Henry and Lucy Moses Professor of Economics at New York University; Guggenheim Fellowship	
Carol Gilligan	professor	known for her work on ethical community and ethical relationships	
Vivien Goldman	professor, Clive Davis School of Recorded Music	wrote the first biography of Bob Marley	
Stephen Jay Gould	Vincent Astor Visiting Professor	known for his development of the evolutionary biology theory of punctuated equilibrium and his scientific writings	
Percy Grainger	professor, 1932–1940	inventor of the Free Music Machine, the forerunner of the synthesizer	
Rinne Groff	professor, Tisch School of the Arts	recipient of the Whiting Writers' Award in 2005 for plays	
Mikhail Gromov	Jay Gould Professor of Mathematics	made major contributions to metric geometry and symplectic geometry	
Martin Hairer	professor	Fields Medal winner	
David Heeger	professor, current	neuroscientist; son of Nobel laureate chemist Alan J. Heeger	
Daniel Webster Hering	dean	credited with taking the first human x-ray in the United States	
Avram Hershko	adjunct professor 1998–	2004 Nobel Prize in Chemistry	
Sidney Hook	professor, 1927–1972	philosopher who championed pragmatism	
Paul Horwich	professor, current	philosopher, Guggenheim Fellowship	
Natalie Jeremijenko	professor, current	photographer, founder of xDesign Environmental Health Clinic	
Jotham Johnson	chairman of Classics	archaeologist; former president of Archaeological Institute of America	
Boyan Jovanovic	professor, current	economist, fellow of the American Academy of Arts and Sciences	
Tony Judt	professor	director of Erich Maria Remarque Institute; author of Postwar	
Frances Kamm	professor	philosopher, winner of a Guggenheim Fellowship	
Eric Kandel	professor	former faculty member at the New York University Medical School; winner of the 2000 Nobel Prize in Physiology or Medicine	
Richard S. Kayne	professor of Linguistics, current	developed the theory of antisymmetry	
Elias Khoury	professor	Lebanese writer and critic	
Galway Kinnell	professor, 1993–	1982 Pulitzer Prize for Poetry	
Israel Kirzner	professor emeritus, current	economist, leading proponent of the Austrian School of Economics	
Yusef Komunyakaa	professor	Pulitzer Prize winner	
Steven E. Koonin	professor	former provost of California Institute of Technology	
Barbara Krauthamer	faculty member, past	historian	
Stewart Krentzman	instructor	CEO of Oki Data Americas, Inc.	
Carol Herselle Krinsky	professor	architectural historian	
Irving Kristol	Henry R. Luce Professor of Urban Values (1969-87)	editor, writer, "godfather" of neo-conservatism	
Saul Krugman	professor	developed first vaccine against hepatitis B	
Mattias Kumm	professor, current	holds a research professorship on "Globalization and the Rule of Law" at the Social Science Research Center (Wissenschaftszentrum Berlin für Sozialforschung, WZB) and Humboldt University in Berlin	
Peter Lax	professor, current	member of the U.S. National Academy of Sciences; awarded the National Medal of Science in 1986, the Wolf Prize in 1987 and the Abel Prize in 2005	
Joseph E. LeDoux	professor, current	neuroscientist	
Spike Lee	film professor in the Tisch School of the Arts, current	actor, director, producer, social activist	
David Leebron	professor	7th president of Rice University	
Jeffrey S. Lehman	professor	former president of Cornell University	
Wassily Leontief	professor, 1975–1999	1973 Bank of Sweden Prize in Economics	
Pierre N. Leval	professor	judge, United States Court of Appeals for the Second Circuit	
Jack Lew	professor	76th U.S. secretary of the Treasury	
David Levering Lewis	professor, current	Julius Silver University Professor, professor of History	
Otto Loewi	professor 1940–1961	1936 Nobel Prize in Physiology or Medicine	
Colin Munro MacLeod	professor, 1941–1970	established that genes are made of DNA	
Gary Marcus	professor, current, Psychology	Robert L. Fantz award, cognitive development	
Theodor Meron	professor	president, International Criminal Tribunal for the former Yugoslavia	
Cheryl Mills	senior vice president for Operations and Administration	former deputy counsel to President Bill Clinton; lead defense attorney in Clinton's 1999 impeachment trial	
Cathleen Synge Morawetz	professor, current	mathematician, winner of the National Medal of Science in 1983 and 1988	
Samuel F. B. Morse	professor, 1832–?	inventor of Morse code	
Brian Morton	professor, current	academic and novelist	
Robert S. Mulliken	professor, 1926–1928	1966 Nobel Prize in Chemistry	
Cammy Myler	professor	luger, member of the U.S. National Luge Team 1985–1998, competed on four Winter Olympics teams	
Gunnar Myrdal	visiting professor	1974 Bank of Sweden Prize in Economics	
Thomas Nagel	professor	scholar, philosophy of mind	
Marion Nestle	professor, current	nutritionist	
Louis Nirenberg	professor	Abel Prize winner	
Ronald K. Noble	professor of law	Interpol secretary general 2000–present	
Conor Cruise O'Brien	professor	Irish politician and academic	
Severo Ochoa	professor, 1942–1974	winner of 1959 Nobel Prize in Physiology or Medicine	
Sharon Olds	professor, current	English creative writing teacher	
Bertell Ollman	full professor		
Henry Bamford Parkes	professor	author of Gods and Men, The Origins of Western Culture and A History of Mexico	
Cyrus Patell	professor, current	American literature and cultural critic	
Adam Penenberg	professor	uncovered the journalistic fraud of The New Republic reporter Stephen Glass	
F. E. Peters	professor, 1961–	pioneer in comparative study of Judaism, Christianity and Islam	
Amir Pnueli	professor of Computer Science, current	winner of the 1996 Turing Award	
Martin Pope	professor emeritus	physical chemist, winner of the 2006 Davy Medal	
Neil Postman	1959–2003	author of Amusing Ourselves to Death; founder of media ecology program	
Mary Louise Pratt	professor, current	Spanish and Portuguese Languages and Literatures	
Itamar Rabinovich	Israeli historian, diplomat and president of Tel Aviv University		
Joseph Ransohoff	professor, 1962–1992	physician	
Debraj Ray	professor, current	economist	
Richard Revesz	professor, current	dean of New York University School of Law	
Robert Rosenblum	professor	art historian and curator	
Kristin Ross	professor, current	professor of comparative literature, recipient of the Guggenheim Fellowship 1999–2000	
Ariel Rubinstein	professor, current	Israeli economist	
Curt Sachs	professor, 1937–1953	co-author of the Sachs–Hornbostel scheme	
Naomi Sager	professor, 1965–1995	pioneer in computational linguistics; director of the Linguistic String Project	
Paul A. Samuelson	visiting professor	winner of 1970 Bank of Sweden Prize in Economics	
Thomas Sargent	professor	a leader of the rational expectations revolution; Berkeley Professor of Economics and Business	
Peter Sarnak	professor, 2001–2005	mathematician	
Mary Schmidt Campbell	professor, current	dean of the Tisch School of the Arts, fellow of the American Academy of Arts and Sciences	
John Scofield	professor, current	jazz fusion guitarist and composer	
Michel Sebastiani	fencing coach	Olympic fencing coach and member of the US Fencing Association Hall of Fame; his NYU women's team won the 1971 National Intercollegiate Women's Fencing Association championship	
Richard Sennett	professor, current	fellow of the Center for Advanced Study in the Behavioral Sciences, American Academy of Arts and Sciences and Royal Society of Literature; founding director of the New York Institute for the Humanities	
Bob Shrum	professor	Democratic political consultant	
Richard Sieburth	professor, current	translator, essayist and editor	
Eero P. Simoncelli	professor, current	won a Technology & Engineering Emmy Award	
Nila Banton Smith	professor, past	director of the Reading Institute	
Alan Sokal	professor	known for the Sokal affair	
John James Stevenson	professor emeritus, 1872–1909	geologist; president of the Geological Society of America in 1898	
Darin Strauss	adjunct professor, 2000–present	author of Chang & Eng and The Real McCoy; 2005 teaching award winner; 2006 Guggenheim Fellowship	
Marti G. Subrahmanyam	professor, current	Charles E. Merrill Professor of Finance at the Stern School of Business	
Edward Sullivan	professor	taught English as a Second Language at New York University for 15 years	
Henry Philip Tappan	professor of philosophy	first president of the University of Michigan	
Allen Tate	professor, 1948–1951	author, Ode to the Confederate Dead	
Ngũgĩ wa Thiong'o	visiting professor	Kenyan activist	
Lewis Thomas	dean, NYU School of Medicine		
S. R. Srinivasa Varadhan	professor, current	mathematician, 2007 winner of the Abel Prize	
Akshay Venkatesh	professor, current	mathematician, winner of the 2007 Salem Prize	
Ludwig von Mises	professor, 1945–1969	leader of the Austrian School of economics	
Lawrence Weschler	professor, current	director of the New York Institute for the Humanities	
Suzanne Weyn	guest instructor, 1988–1989	author of over 40 novels	
Thomas Wolfe		author	
Lawrence Wright	professor, current	fellow at the Center for Law and Security at the New York University School of Law, author of The Looming Tower: Al Qaeda and the Road to 9/11	
Robert J. C. Young	professor, current	postcolonial theorist, writer and historian	
Ronald W. Zweig	professor, current	Israeli historian, member of the Historical Advisory Panel to the National Archives in Washington, D.C.	

== New York University presidents ==
Name	Relation to NYU	Years	Reference
James M. Matthews	1st president	1831–1839	
Theodore Frelinghuysen	2nd president	1839–1850, U.S. senator	
Isaac Ferris	3rd president	1853–1870	
Howard Crosby	4th president	1870–1881	
John Hall	5th president	1881–1891	
Henry Mitchell MacCracken	6th president	1891–1911, developer of the University Heights Campus	
Elmer Ellsworth Brown	7th president	1911–1933	
Harry Woodburn Chase	8th president	1933–1951	
James Loomis Madden	Acting chancellor	1951–1952	
Henry Townley Heald	9th president	1952–1956	
Carroll Vincent Newsom	10th president	1956–1962	
James McNaughton Hester	11th president	1962–1975	
John C. Sawhill	12th president	1975–1980	
Ivan Loveridge Bennett	Acting president	1980–1981	
John Brademas	13th president	1981–1991, United States House of Representatives	
L. Jay Oliva	14th president	1991–2002	
John Sexton	15th president	2003–2015	
Andrew D. Hamilton	16th president	2016–present	

== New York University founders ==
- Albert Gallatin
- Morgan Lewis

== See also ==
- Category:New York University faculty
- List of New York University alumni
- List of NYU Stern people
- List of NYU Tandon School of Engineering people
- List of NYU Courant Institute people
- List of NYU GSAS people
- List of NYU Law School people
- List of NYU School of Medicine people
- List of NYU Tisch School of the Arts people
- List of NYU Steinhardt people
- List of NYU Gallatin people
- List of NYU Wagner people
- List of New York University staff
