= List of NYU Courant Institute people =

== Directors ==
- Richard Courant (1935–1958)
- James J. Stoker (1958–1966)
- Kurt O. Friedrichs (1966–1967)
- Jürgen Moser (1967–1970)
- Louis Nirenberg (1970–1972)
- Peter Lax (1972–1980)
- S. R. Srinivasa Varadhan (1980–1984)
- Cathleen Synge Morawetz (1984–1988)
- Henry McKean (1988–1994)
- David W. McLaughlin (1994–2002)
- Charles M. Newman (2002–2006)
- Leslie Greengard (2006–2011)
- Gerard Ben Arous (2011–present)

== Notable Courant faculty ==
This is a small selection of Courant's famous faculty over the years and a few of their distinctions:

- Gérard Ben Arous, Davidson Prize
- Marsha Berger, NASA Software of the Year, National Academy of Engineering, National Academy of Sciences
- Fedor Bogomolov
- Richard Bonneau
- Luis Caffarelli, Wolf Prize
- Sylvain Cappell, Guggenheim Fellowship
- Sourav Chatterjee, Davidson Prize
- Jeff Cheeger, Veblen Prize, Guggenheim Fellowship, Max Planck Research Prize
- Demetrios Christodoulou, 1993 MacArthur Fellow
- Richard J. Cole, Guggenheim Fellowship
- Martin Davis, Steele Prize
- Percy Deift, George Pólya Prize, Guggenheim Fellowship, National Academy of Sciences, American Academy of Arts and Science
- Kurt O. Friedrichs, 1976 National Medal of Science
- Paul Garabedian, NAS Prize in Applied Mathematics, National Academy of Sciences, American Academy of Arts and Science
- Leslie Greengard, Steele Prize, Packard Foundation Fellowship, NSF Presidential Young Investigator, National Academy of Engineering, National Academy of Sciences
- Mikhail Gromov, 2009 Abel Prize, Wolf Prize, Steele Prize, Kyoto Prize, Balzan Prize
- Larry Guth
- Fritz John, 1984 MacArthur Fellow
- Joseph B. Keller, 1988 National Medal of Science, Wolf Prize
- Michel Kervaire
- Subhash Khot, 2010 Alan T. Waterman Award
- Morris Kline
- Peter Lax, Abel Prize winner, 1986 National Medal of Science, Steele Prize, Wolf Prize, Norbert Wiener Prize
- Lin Fanghua, Bôcher Memorial Prize, American Academy of Arts and Science
- Wilhelm Magnus
- Andrew Majda, NAS Prize in Applied Mathematics, John von Neumann Prize (SIAM)
- Henry McKean, National Academy of Science, American Academy of Arts and Science
- Bud Mishra, Association for Computing Machinery Fellow
- Cathleen Synge Morawetz, 1998 National Medal of Science, Steele Prize, Birkhoff Prize, Noether Lecturer, National Academy of Sciences, American Academy of Arts and Science
- Jürgen Moser, Wolf Prize, James Craig Watson Medal
- Assaf Naor, European Mathematical Society Prize, Packard Fellowship, Salem Prize, Bôcher Memorial Prize, Blavatnik Award
- Charles Newman, National Academy of Science, American Academy of Arts and Science
- Louis Nirenberg, 2015 Abel Prize, 1995 Crafoord Prize, National Medal of Science, Steele Prize, Bôcher Memorial Prize, Chern Medal, National Academy of Sciences, American Academy of Arts and Science
- Laxmi Parida, IBM Master Inventor and ISCB Fellow
- Charles S. Peskin, 1983 MacArthur Fellow, Birkhoff Prize, National Medal of Science
- Amir Pnueli, National Academy of Engineering, Israel Prize, Turing Award, Association for Computing Machinery Fellow
- Theodore Rappaport, founder of NYU Wireless, Fellow of the National Academy of Inventors
- Peter Sarnak
- Jack Schwartz, developed the programming language SETL at NYU
- Michael J. Shelley, American Physical Society Fellow, François Naftali Frenkiel Award
- Victor Shoup, with Ronald Cramer developed the Cramer–Shoup cryptosystem
- Joel Spencer
- K. R. Sreenivasan
- S. R. Srinivasa Varadhan, Abel Prize winner, Steele Prize, National Academy of Sciences, American Academy of Arts and Science, Fellow of the Royal Society, National Medal of Science
- Daniel Stein, Fellow of the American Physical Society, Fellow of the American Association for the Advancement of Science
- Demetri Terzopoulos FRS FRSC, Guggenheim Fellow, IEEE and ACM Fellow, Academy Award for Technical Achievement, IEEE Computer Pioneer Award
- Akshay Venkatesh, Salem Prize, Packard Fellowship
- Olof B. Widlund
- Margaret H. Wright, National Academy of Science, National Academy of Engineering
- Lai-Sang Young, Satter Prize, Guggenheim Fellowship, American Academy of Arts and Science

== Notable Courant alumni ==
This is a small selection of Courant's alumni:

- Anjelina Belakovskaia (Masters in Finance 2001), U.S. Women's Chess Champion
- Anita Borg (PhD 1981), founding director of the Institute for Women and Technology (IWT)
- Ivan Corwin (PhD 2011), professor at Columbia University
- Charles Epstein (PhD 1983), hyperbolic geometry
- Corwin Hansch (PhD 1944), statistics
- Joseph B. Keller, 1988 National Medal of Science, Wolf Prize
- Barbara Keyfitz (PhD 1970), director of the Fields Institute
- Sergiu Klainerman (PhD 1978), professor at Princeton
- Morris Kline (PhD 1936), NYU professor (1938–1975)
- David Korn (PhD 1969), creator of the KornShell
- Martin Kruskal (PhD 1952), National Medal of Science, co-discoverer of solitons and the inverse scattering method for solving KdV
- Peter Lax (PhD 1949), recipient of the Abel Prize, National Medal of Science, Steele Prize, Wolf Prize, Norbert Wiener Prize
- Chen Li-an (PhD 1968), Taiwanese Minister of Defence
- Cathleen Morawetz (PhD 1950), National Medal of Science, Birkhoff Prize, Lifetime Achievement Award from the AMS, professor emeritus at Courant Institute
- Louis Nirenberg (PhD 1949), Crafoord Prize, Bôcher Memorial Prize, National Medal of Science, Chern Medal
- Stanley Osher (PhD 1966), level set method, professor at University of California, Los Angeles
- George C. Papanicolaou (PhD 1969), professor at Stanford University
- Gary Robinson, software engineer noted for anti-spam algorithms
- Shmuel Weinberger (PhD 1982), topology and geometry; professor at University of Chicago
- Jacob Wolfowitz (PhD 1942)
- Wojciech Zaremba (PhD 2016), co-founder of OpenAI

== See also ==
- List of New York University people
