= List of New York University staff =

The following is a partial list of New York University staff. Another partial list of notable New York University administrators and staff is available on NNDB website: New York University administrators

- Daniel Altman
- H. A. Berlin
- Murray Boren
- David Brimmer
- Chelsea Clinton
- Ralph W. Conant
- Frank Miles Day
- Jennifer Fisher
- Geoffrey S. Fletcher
- Leo Galland
- Patricia Goldman-Rakic
- Jefferson Han
- Mary J. Hickman
- Thea D. Hodge
- Ashley Kahn
- Donald Mattison
- Grigori Perelman
- Julie Salamon
- Ruth Sergel
- Joanna Waley-Cohen
- Michael Whalen (composer)
- E. Frances White
- Pharrell Williams
- Robert Ubell
