= McLouth =

McLouth may refer to:

== Places ==
- McLouth, Kansas, a city in Jefferson County, Kansas, United States.

== People ==
- Nate McLouth (born 1981), baseball player
- Lawrence Amos McLouth (1863–1927), scholar of Germanic languages and literature

== Other ==
- McLouth Steel, former integrated steel mill in Trenton, Michigan
