= David Pine =

David Pine may refer to:

- David Andrew Pine (1891–1970), American judge
- David J. Pine, American physicist
- David Pine (diplomat), New Zealand High Commissioner to India, Bangladesh and Nepal, former High Commissioner to Malaysia and Brunei, and former ambassador to the Philippines, also former rock musician.

== See also ==
- Dave Pine (b. 1958), Californian politician
- David Pines (1924–2018), American physicist
