= Katrina Wyman =

Legal scholar

- Born: Canada

Academic background
- Education: University of Toronto (BA, MA, LLM); Yale University (LLM)

Academic work
- Discipline: Law
- Sub-discipline: Environmental law Property law

Katrina M. Wyman is a Canadian legal scholar and the Sarah Herring Sorin Professor of Law at New York University School of Law.

== Early life and education ==
Wyman was born and raised in Canada. She earned a Bachelor of Arts, Master of Arts, and Master of Laws from the University of Toronto and another Master of Laws from Yale Law School.

== Career ==
Wyman's scholarship concerns the law of property and environmental law, sometimes integrating the two approaches. Among Wyman's works is a study of the property implications of taxi medallions in New York City.

== Selected publications ==
- Schoenbrod, David; Stewart, Richard B; Wyman, Katrina M. (2010). Breaking the Logjam: Environmental Protection That Will Work. Yale University Press. ISBN 978-0-300-14961-6. JSTOR j.ctt1npkwx. OCLC 841171946.
