= List of New York University Graduate School of Arts and Science people =

This is a list of people associated with the New York University Graduate School of Arts and Science, a school within New York University (NYU) founded in 1886 by Henry Mitchell MacCracken.

== Notable faculty ==
Saul Bellow	Writer	Professor	1976 Nobel Prize in Literature
Harold Bloom	Literary critic	Berg Professor of English	1985 MacArthur Fellow
Faye D. Ginsburg	Scholar	Professor of Anthropology	1994 MacArthur Fellow
Galway Kinnell	Poet	Professor	1982 Pulitzer Prize for Poetry
Wassily Leontief	Economist	Professor 1975–1999	1973 Nobel Prize in Economics
Otto Loewi	Pharmacologist	Professor 1940–1961	1936 Nobel Prize in Physiology or Medicine
Ruth Watson Lubic	Scholar	Adjunct professor	1993 MacArthur Fellow
Paule Marshall	Writer	Professor of English	1992 MacArthur Fellow
Robert S. Mulliken	Physicist, chemist	Professor 1926–1928	1966 Nobel Prize in Chemistry
Rita P. Wright	Scholar	Professor of Anthropology	1988 MacArthur Fellow

== Alumni ==
(*did not graduate)

=== Nobel laureates ===
Julius Axelrod	Biochemist	M.Sc. 1941	1970 Nobel Prize in Physiology or Medicine
Friedrich Hayek	Economist	Postgraduate, 1923–1924	1974 Nobel Prize in Economics
Frederick Reines	Physicist	Ph.D. 1944	1995 Nobel Prize in Physics
Clifford Shull	Physicist	Ph.D. 1941	1994 Nobel Prize in Physics

=== Pulitzer Prize winners ===
Dorothy Rabinowitz	Journalist and commentator	Ph.D. 1960	2001 Pulitzer Prize for Commentary
James Ford Rhodes	Historian	1865–*	1918 Pulitzer Prize for History for History of the Civil War, 1861–1865
Harold C. Schonberg	Music critic, journalist	M.A., 1939	1971 Pulitzer Prize for Criticism
John Patrick Shanley	Playwright	M.A., 1977	2005 Pulitzer Prize for Drama
Neil Simon	Playwright	1944–1945*	1991 Pulitzer Prize for Drama (Lost in Yonkers)

=== Other ===
Gloria Allred	Feminist, lawyer	M.A., 1971	
David Antin	Poet	M.A., 1966	PEN Los Angeles Award for Poetry
Rita Mae Brown	Author	M.A., 1964	Rubyfruit Jungle
Lawrence Joseph DeNardis	Politician	M.A., 1960; Ph.D., 1989	United States House of Representatives
Stavros Dimas	Politician	M.A., 1969	European Commissioner for the Environment
William Henry Draper, Jr.	Diplomat	M.A., 1917	Under secretary of War and the Army
Robert Patrick John Finn	Diplomat	M.A.	U.S. ambassador to Afghanistan
Joseph Heller	Author	M.A. in English 1945 – *	Catch-22
Bernard Herrmann	Composer	Student under Percy Grainger at NYU	Academy Award 1941, All That Money Can Buy
Heather M. Hodges	Diplomat	M.A.	U.S. ambassador to Moldova
Rush Holt	Politician	M.S. 1974, Ph.D. 1981	United States House of Representatives (1999–)
Meir Kahane	Founder of the U.S. Jewish Defense League	M.A., 1957	Leader of the Kach political party in the Israeli Knesset
Elodie Lauten	Composer	M.A., 1986	
Evelyn Lear	Soprano		Grammy Award 1966 for her performance of Berg's Wozzeck
John McGrath	Artistic director	Ph.D., 1999	Artistic director and CEO of the Manchester International Festival
Raymond Joseph McGrath	Politician	M.A., 1968	United States House of Representatives (1981–1993)
Janet Mock	Writer	M.A. 2006	GLAAD Media Stephen F. Kolzak Award 2020, Shorty Award for Best in Activism 2016
Leonard Peikoff	Philosopher	M.A., 1957, Ph.D., 1964	Leading advocate of objectivism
B. Caroll Reece		M.A., 1916	United States House of Representatives (1921–1961)
J.D. Salinger	Author	Coursework*	Catcher in the Rye
Agnes Varis	Entrepreneur	M.A., 1977, M.B.A., 1979	Founder of Aegis Pharmaceuticals
Ocean Vuong	Author	M.F.A., 2016	MacArthur "Genius" Grant (2019), Whiting Award 2016, T. S. Eliot Prize 2017
Judith Weis	Marine biologist	M.A., 1964, Ph.D., 1967	
Saul Williams	Poet	M.A., 1995	Amethyst Rock Star
John Woodruff	Athlete	M.A., 1941	Olympic gold medalist, 1936
Minoru Yamasaki	Architect	M.A., 1951	Works include the World Trade Center
Mary Carlin Yates	Diplomat	M.A., Ph.D.	U.S. ambassador to the Republic of Ghana

(*did not graduate)
