= Dante C. Youla =

American electrical engineer (1925–2021)

Dante C. Youla (October 17, 1925 – August 13, 2021) was Professor Emeritus of Electrical Engineering at Polytechnic Institute of New York University. He has made fundamental contributions to the areas of Circuit theory, analysis and synthesis; Communication theory; microwave systems and control theory.

The IEEE Circuits and Systems Society awarded him the Vitold Belevitch Award in 2005. In 1988 he received the IEEE Control Systems Science and Engineering Award, "for original contributions in the areas of circuits, systems and control theory, and the rigorous solution of engineering problems". And Youla received in 1965 the IEEE W.R.G. Baker Award, for his paper "A New Theory of Broad-Band Matching". The Youla–Kucera parametrization in control theory is named after him.
