= Seema Nanda =

Indian mathematician

Seema Nanda is an Indian mathematician. In her research she applies mathematics to study problems in biology, engineering and finance. Her research interests are primarily in solving real world problems using mathematics and computations.

== Education ==
Her education in mathematics was at the Courant Institute of Mathematical Sciences of New York University, where she obtained her Ph.D in 1998. Her PhD thesis was in the area of probability theory and was supervised by Charles M. Newman.

== Career ==
Prior to her current position as a faculty at the Tata Institute of Fundamental Research in Bangalore, she held cross-disciplinary academic positions at the University of Tennessee and at Harvey Mudd College. She switched careers from working in the corporate world to academic research in 2004. Before returning to academia she worked as a quantitative analyst for an investment bank in New York City. She is also interested in encouraging the youth of India to understand science and mathematics. In 2012 she founded an NGO called Leora Trust which aims to empower girls through education.

== Awards ==
She was a recipient of the Bella Manel prize (given to a promising female student of mathematics at NYU) in 1996.
