= David Schoenbrod =

American legal scholar

David S. Schoenbrod is a trustee professor of law at New York Law School.

From 1972-79 Schoenbrod's work with the Natural Resources Defense Council made the United States Environmental Protection Agency begin reducing tetraethyl lead in gasoline sooner than they were going to. He also campaigned to resurrect the then-decrepit New York City subway, and protect the environment of Puerto Rico. Previously, he was Director of Program Development at the community development project that Senator Robert Kennedy established in Bedford Stuyvesant. He has also been a senior fellow at the Cato Institute and the American Enterprise Institute and now is a senior fellow at the Niskanen Center.

His most recent book is DC Confidential: Inside the Five Tricks of Washington (Encounter Books, 2017) with forewords by Governor Howard Dean and Senator Mike Lee (Encounter Books, 2017).

== Published works ==
Remedies: Public and Private, First Edition, co-authored with A. Macbeth, D. Levine, D. Jung (West Publishing Co., 1990). Power Without Responsibility: How Congress Abuses the People Through Delegation (Yale University Press, 1993). Remedies: Public and Private, Second Edition, co-authored with A. Macbeth, D. Levine, D. Jung (West Publishing Co., 1996). Remedies: Public and Private, Third Edition, co-authored with A. Macbeth, D. Levine, D. Jung (West Publishing Co., 2002). Democracy by Decree: What Happens When Courts Run Government, co-authored with R. Sandler (Yale University Press, 2003). Saving Our Environment from Washington: How Congress Grabs Power, Shirks Responsibility, and Shortchanges the People (Yale University Press, 2005). Remedies: Public and Private, Fourth Edition, co-authored with A. Macbeth, D. Levine, D. Jung (West Publishing Co., 2006). Breaking the Logjam: Environmental Protection That Will Work, co-authored with R.B. Stewart and K.M. Wyman (Yale University Press, 2010). D.C. Confidential: Inside the Five Tricks of Washington, with forewords by Governor Howard Dean and Senator Mike Lee (Encounter Books, 2017).

== Education ==
He has an undergraduate degree from Yale College, a graduate degree in economics from Oxford University, which he attended as a Marshall Scholar, and a law degree from Yale Law.
