= Taylor Antrim =

American novelist

- Born: 1974 (age 51–52)
- Education: Stanford University; University of Virginia (MFA)
- Occupations: Novelist, journalist
- Writing career
- Genre: Fiction
- Website: www.taylorantrim.com

Taylor Antrim (born 1974) is an American writer and editor best known for his novels The Headmaster Ritual and Immunity. Antrim is a graduate of Stanford University, and received his MFA from the University of Virginia. He is currently Executive Editor at Vogue. He lives in Brooklyn, New York.

The Headmaster Ritual was published in 2007 by Houghton Mifflin. Set at "the Britton School ... the oldest, most selective prep school in the country," it tells the parallel stories of Dyer Martin, a new teacher at Britton, and James Wolfe, a senior and the son of the school's maniacal headmaster.

Immunity was published in 2015 by Regan Arts. It is a dystopian thriller about a young fixer named Catherine working for a shadowy luxury concierge service.
