= Anna Goldfeder =

Austrian medical researcher (1898–1993)

- Born: 1898; Poland
- Died: February 15, 1993 (aged 94–95); New York City
- Education: University of Prague (D.Sc.)
- Occupations: Medical researcher (cancer, radiology)
- Awards: Presidential gold medal, New York Academy of Sciences
- Scientific career
- Workplaces: University of Vienna; Harvard University; Columbia University; Lenox Hill Hospital; Rockefeller Institute; New York City Hospitals Department; New York University

Dr. Anna Goldfeder (1898 – February 15, 1993) was a pioneering researcher in the fields of radiology and cancer treatment. Born in 1898 in Józefów Poland, Goldfeder studied at the University of Prague and worked at the Masaryk University before earning her doctorate in natural sciences (D.Sc.) in 1922. She was invited to conduct research in the United States, and immigrated in 1931. During her 66-year career as a research scientist, she worked at the University of Vienna, Harvard University, Columbia University, Lenox Hill Hospital, the Rockefeller Institute, the New York City Hospitals Department and the Department of Biology at New York University Washington Square, where she was director of the Cancer and Radiobiology Research Laboratory.

Goldfeder is known both for her role as a pioneering woman in advanced scientific research and for her many accomplishments as a researcher. Autumn Stanley, member of the Institute for Historical Study (Berkeley), writes "The contributions of this distinguished Polish-born researcher to cancer therapy in general and to radiology in particular can scarcely be overestimated." Goldfeder created a strain of white lab mice, named X-GF (after her initials), that is resistant to both natural and lab-induced cancerous tumors and is widely used in experimentation. She discovered that radiation treatment could (in mice) completely destroy a malignant tumor without otherwise harming the subject; she also improved use of lead shielding, and discovered that the effects of radiation varied with the emission medium. Sol Siegelman, writing a tribute to Goldfeder in the Annals of the New York Academy of Sciences, wrote:

"I should like to note briefly just a few of her contributions to provide at least a slight indication of her originality and foresight. (1) Anna Goldfeder was one of the first to succeed in establishing tissue culture with human epithelial cells -- an achievement made even more monumental by the fact that it was accomplished prior to the introduction of antibiotics. (2) She was one of the first to identify the importance of ensuring isogenicity of the host in attempting to obtain useful therapeutic and biological information from tumor transplants. (3) Anna established the therapeutic value of fractionated and localized radiation in treating tumors and showed that cures could in fact be obtained using animal models. These results had a significant impact on the design of protocols for clinical radiotherapy. (4) She developed the famous XgF strain of mice, which were highly resistant to spontaneous as well as to induced tumors. These mice became a useful experimental tool for the analysis of questions related to both the cure and the cause of cancer.

Goldfeder was also known for her devotion to her scientific pursuits. Long past the age of mandatory retirement when Delafield Hospital in New York was closed, Goldfeder was unable to convince city officials to relocate her laboratory. Rather than close, and with some self-funding, she remained in the abandoned building for two years before she secured enough grant money to move her work to New York University facilities. She established, with a bequest, the Dr. Anna Goldfeder Scholarship award for Ph.D. students at the Weizmann Institute of Science in Rehovot, Israel.
