= George Bugliarello =

American academic administrator (1927–2011)

- Born: May 20, 1927; Trieste, Italy
- Died: February 18, 2011 (aged 83); Roslyn, New York, US
- Education: University of Padua; University of Minnesota; MIT
- Spouse: Virginia Upton Harding
- Children: 2
- Scientific career
- Fields: Civil engineering
- Workplaces: Carnegie Mellon University; University of Rome Tor Vergata; University of Illinois at Chicago

George Bugliarello (May 20, 1927—February 18, 2011) was an Italian President Emeritus, Institute Professor and former chancellor of the Polytechnic Institute of NYU (formerly Polytechnic University).

== Early life ==
George Bugliarello was born as Georgio Bugliarello-Wondrich to Spera Bugliarello-Wondrich and Colonel Federico Bugliarello Magnano di San Lio in Trieste, Italy. He studied engineering at the University of Padua from which he graduated in 1951 with summa cum laude. He then completed his Master's degree at the University of Minnesota civil engineering in 1954 and five years later he obtained a Ph.D. from the Massachusetts Institute of Technology in both hydrodynamics and civil engineering. He also has various honorary degrees from the University of Trieste, the Milwaukee School of Engineering, the Illinois Institute of Technology, Pace University, Trinity College and Rensselaer Polytechnic Institute.

== Career ==
George joined the faculty at Carnegie Mellon University in 1959 as an assistant professor of biotechnology and civil engineering and worked there along with Tin-Kan Hung who was a professor of biomedical engineering until 1969. In 1964 he became the founding director of the bioengineering program at CMU and five years later became Dean of engineering at the University of Illinois at Chicago.

From 1969 to 1972 he was a Director of the Biomedical Engineering Society.

On October 15, 1973, he was inaugurated as the 13th President of the Polytechnic Institute of New York and served as such till 1994.

Since 1987 he was a member of the National Academy of Engineering and in 2003 he was elected as a Foreign Secretary of the NAE.

In 1994 George had launched the Center for Technology and Financial Services at Polytechnic and from 1994 to 1997 he served as chairman of the Board on Infrastructure and the Constructed Environment of the National Research Council (BOSTID). From 1997 to 2011 he was an interim editor of The Bridge (the quarterly publication of the National Academy of Engineering), and was co-founder and co-editor of Technology in Society - An International Journal. George also served on several editorial advisory boards, had authored over 300 professional papers, and was the author, co-author or editor of numerous books.

He was a lifetime member of the National Associate of The National Academies and served as chair of the National Academy of Engineering Council’s International Affairs Committee.

George also was a chairman of the National Medal of Technology Nomination Evaluation Committee, the Advisory Panel for Technology Transfer to the Middle East of the Office of Technology Assessment, and the Committee on Science, Engineering and Public Policy (COSEPP) of the American Association for the Advancement of Science. He served as chair of the Board on Infrastructure and the Constructed Environment of the National Research Council, and of the National Academies Megacities project for the Habitat II conference. He also served as chair of the National Academies steering committee on the Megacities. Other committee service included the U.S. National Academies-Russian Academy of Sciences Committee on Terrorism Confronting the U.S. and Russia and co-chairmanship of a joint Russian-American Task Force on Urban Security.

Dr. Bugliarello’s international experience included consultantships abroad for OECD as a reviewer of the science policy of several countries, and for UNESCO, assignments as a specialist for the U.S. Department of State in Venezuela and Central Africa. He also held a NATO Senior Faculty Fellowship at Technische Universität Berlin, was a member on the U.S.-Egypt Joint Consultative Committee of the National Academy of Sciences, and member on the Scientific Committee of the Summer School on Environmental Dynamics in Venice. He had been the U.S. member of the Science for Stability Steering Committee, and of the Science for Peace Steering Committee, of the Scientific Affairs Division of NATO.

George Bugliarello had died of pneumonia on February 18, 2011, in Roslyn, New York.

== Fellowships and honors ==
- 1967 - American Society of Civil Engineers
- 1978 - American Association for the Advancement of Science
- 1984 - American Society for Engineering Education
- 1993 - American Institute for Medical and Biological Engineering

He also was the founding member of the Marconi Society, a member of the Council on Foreign Relations and a Fellow of the New York Academy of Sciences, and the Biomedical Engineering Society.

== Personal life ==
George Bugliarello was married to Virginia Upton Harding. Together they had two sons; David Wondrich and Nicholas Bugliarello as well as three grandchildren. Besides engineering, his other job was education in which he had a broad background ranging from fluid mechanics to computer languages, the environment, biomedical engineering and science policy.

== Works ==
- History and Philosophy of Technology
- Impact of Noise Pollution: A Socio-Technological Introduction

== Remembrance ==
- George Bugliarello Prize (a grant of $5,000 is awarded biennially)
