= Leo Galland =

American physician (born 1943)

- Born: March 7, 1943 (age 83); Bombay, India
- Education: Harvard University; New York University School of Medicine
- Occupations: Writer; physician

Leopold David Galland (born March 7, 1943) is a New York-based internist and author who specializes in undiagnosed or difficult-to-treat illnesses. His practice combines conventional and alternative therapies. Galland was awarded the Linus Pauling Award by the Institute for Functional Medicine in 2000.

His research includes nutrition, chronic allergies, leaky-gut syndrome, and Lyme disease. He is the author of several medical books including Superimmunity for Kids (1989), The Four Pillars of Healing (1997), Power Healing (1998), The Fat Resistance Diet (2006) and The Allergy Solution.
