= Bernard Brodie =

Bernard Brodie may refer to:

- Bernard Brodie (military strategist) (1910–1978), American military strategist
- Bernard Beryl Brodie (1907–1989), British researcher on drug therapy
