= Thomas H. Bender =

American historian (born 1944)

Thomas H. Bender (born 1944) is an American historian, specializing in urban history and intellectual history. He joined New York University in 1974 and served there as University Professor of the Humanities from 1982 until his retirement in May 2015. He contributes regularly to the press, with articles published in The New York Times, The Nation, Los Angeles Times, Chronicle of Higher Education, and Newsday, among others.

== Biography ==
He graduated from Santa Clara University with a B.A. (1966) and the University of California, Davis with an M.A. (1967) and a Ph.D. (1971). He taught Urban Studies and History for three years at the University of Wisconsin–Green Bay from 1971 before moving to New York University. During his tenure there, he was Chair at the Department of History from 1986 to 1989, and Dean for the Humanities from 1995 to 1998.

He moderated an online discussion at History Matters.

== Awards ==
- 1974 Frederick Jackson Turner Award

== Selected works ==
- Bender, Thomas (2006). A Nation Among Nations: America's Place in World History. New York, NY: Hill and Wang. ISBN 978-0809095278., table of contents
- Bender, Thomas; Katz, Philip M.; Palmer, Colin (2003). The Education of Historians for Twenty-first Century. Urbana and Chicago, IL: University of Illinois Press. ISBN 978-0252071652.
- Bender, Thomas, ed. (2002). Rethinking American History in a Global Age. Berkeley and Los Angeles, CA: University of California Press. ISBN 978-0520230583.
- Bender, Thomas; Smith, Michael Peter, eds. (2001). City and Nation: Rethinking Place and Identity. Piscataway, NJ: Transaction Publishers. ISBN 978-0765808714.
- Bender, Thomas; Schorske, Carl E., eds. (1998). American Academic Culture in Transformation. Princeton, NJ: Princeton University Press. ISBN 978-0691058245.
- Bender, Thomas; Schorske, Carl E. (1994). Budapest and New York: Studies in Metropolitan Transformation, 1870-1930. New York, NY: Russell Sage Foundation. ISBN 978-0871541130.
- Bender, Thomas (1992). Intellect and Public Life: Essays on the Social History of Academic Intellectuals in the United States. Baltimore, MD: Johns Hopkins University Press. ISBN 978-0801844331.
- Bender, Thomas, ed. (1992). The Antislavery Debate: Capitalism and Abolitionism as a Problem in Historical Interpretation. Berkeley and Los Angeles, CA: University of California Press. ISBN 978-0520077799.
- Bender, Thomas (1988). New York Intellect: A History of Intellectual Life in New York City from 1750 to the Beginnings of Our Own Time. Baltimore, MD: Johns Hopkins University Press. ISBN 978-0801836398.
- Bender, Thomas (1982). Toward an Urban Vision: Ideas and Institutions in Nineteenth-Century America. Lexington, KY: University of Kentucky Press. ISBN 978-0813113265.
- Bender, Thomas (1978). Community and Social Change in America. New Brunswick, NJ: Rutgers University Press. ISBN 978-0813508580.
