= Thomas A. Abercrombie =

American writer and anthropologist (1951–2019)

Thomas Alan Abercrombie (January 22, 1951 – April 11, 2019) was an American writer and associate professor of anthropology at New York University. He is the author of Pathways of Memory and Power, a book which explores the ethnography and history of the Andeans. he died from liver cancer in 2019 at age 68.

Abercrombie was also a recipient of a Guggenheim Fellowship for 2004–2005.

== Bibliography ==
- Abercrombie, Thomas A. (1998). Pathways of Memory and Power: Ethnography and History among an Andean People. Madison, Wis.: University of Wisconsin Press. ISBN 978-0-299-15310-6.
- Abercrombie, Thomas A. (2018). Passing to América: Antonio (Née Maria) Yta’s Transgressive, Transatlantic Life in the Twilight of the Spanish Empire. University Park: Pennsylvania State University Press.
