= Cyrus Patell =

American academic

Cyrus R. K. Patell (born October 9, 1961) is a literary and cultural critic who writes and teaches on World literature with a focus on US literature. He is currently Professor of English at New York University (NYU) and Global Network Professor of Literature at New York University Abu Dhabi, where he previously served as Associate Dean of Humanities.

Patell was born in 1961 to a Filipina mother and Pakistani Parsi father, both students at Columbia University. Patell received his AB from Harvard College in 1983 and his PhD from Harvard University in 1991. His dissertation, supervised by Sacvan Bercovitch, was entitled The cultural logic of individualism in late twentieth century America. Before taking up his position at NYU, he was a President's Postdoctoral Fellow at the University of California, Berkeley.

He has interests in the theory and practice of cosmopolitanism; US literature and culture; the history and culture of New York City; Global Shakespeare; minority discourse; cultural studies; and literary historiography. His publications include:

- Lucasfilm: Filmmaking, Philosophy, and the Star Wars Universe. London: Bloomsbury Academic, 2021.
- Cosmopolitanism and the Literary Imagination. New York: Palgrave Macmillan, 2015.
- Emergent US Literatures: From Multiculturalism to Cosmopolitanism in the Late Twentieth Century. New York: New York UP, 2014.
- Some Girls (33 1/3, 81). New York, NY: Continuum, 2011.
- The Cambridge Companion to the Literature of New York. Cambridge: Cambridge UP, 2010. [Co-edited with Bryan Waterman].
- Negative Liberties: Morrison, Pynchon, and the Problem of Liberal Ideology. Durham, NC: Duke UP, 2001.
- Joyce's Use of History in Finnegans Wake. Cambridge, MA: Harvard UP, 1984.

Patell also served as associate editor for the first two volumes of the Cambridge History of American Literature (general editor, Sacvan Bercovitch) and contributed the "Emergent Literatures" section to volume seven, Prose Writing, 1940–1990.

He is the co-editor (with Deborah Lindsay Williams) of The Oxford History of Literature in English: Volume 8, American Fiction after 1940 (general editor, Patrick Parrinder).

== Fellowships and honors ==
- Distinguished Teaching Award, NYU, 2004
- Golden Dozen Award, NYU, 2003
- Research Challenge Fund Grant, NYU, 2004, 1999, 1998, 1996
- Curricular Development Challenge Fund Grant, NYU, 2004, 1997
- Golden Dozen Teaching Award, NYU, 1995
- President's Postdoctoral Fellowship, University of California, 1991-1993
