= Eitan Zemel =

American operations manager

Eitan Zemel is the Vice Dean for Strategic Initiatives and the W. Edwards Deming Professor of Quality and Productivity at New York University's Stern School of Business. He also teaches courses in operations management and operations strategy at NYU. Professor Zemel also teaches for the Master of Science in Business Analytics Program for Executives (MSBA), which is jointly hosted by NYU Stern and NYU Shanghai.

== Academic interests ==
Zemel's research is focused on computations and algorithms. He developed the concepts used in the first practical algorithm for solving large knapsack problems and which are used in almost every efficient algorithm for this type of problem.

Other areas of Zemel's research include supply chain management, operations strategy, service operations, and incentive issues in operations management. His writing has appeared in numerous publications including The SIAM Journal on Applied Mathematics, Operations Research, Games and Economic Behavior, and Annals of Operations Research.

Zemel is also an associate editor of Manufacturing Review, Production and Operations Management, and Management Science, and the senior editor of Manufacturing and Service Operations.

== Books ==
- Anupindi, R.; S. Chopra; S. Deshmukh; J.A. Van Mieghem & E. Zemel (1996). Managing Business Flows. New Jersey: Prentice Hall. ISBN 978-0-13-067546-0.

== Publications ==
Eitan Zemel is a co-author of over 40 articles.

- Balas, E.; R. Naus; E. Zemel (1987). A Comment on Some Computational Results on Real 0-1 Knapsack Problems. Vol. 6. Operations Research Letters. pp. 139–141.
- Balas, E.; E. Zemel (1980). An Algorithm for Large Zero-One Knapsack Problems. Vol. 28. Operations Research. pp. 1130–1154.
- Balas, E.; E. Zemel (1978). Facets of the Knapsack Polytope from Minimal Covers. Vol. 34. SIAM Journal on Applied Mathematics. pp. 119–148.
- Balas, E.; E. Zemel (1977). Graph Substitution and Set Packing Polytopes. Vol. 7. Networks. pp. 267–284.
- Balas, E.; E. Zemel (1984). Lifting and Complementing Yields All the Facets of Positive Zero-One Polytopes. Amsterdam: in: R. W. Cottle, H. L. Kelmanson, and B. Korte (eds.); Mathematical Programming. pp. 13–34.
- Bassok, Y.; R. Anupindi & E. Zemel (2001). A General Framework for the Study of Decentralized Distribution Systems. Vol. 3. MSOR. pp. 349–368.
- Chen, Ying-Ju; S. Seshardi & E. Zemel (March–April 2008). Sourcing Through Auctions and Audits. Production and Operations Management. pp. 1–18.
- Drezner, Z.; E. Zemel (1992). Competitive Location in the Plane. Annals of Operations Research.
- Gilboa, I.; E. Kalai & E. Zemel (1993). On the Computation Complexity of Eliminating Dominated Strategies. Vol. 18. Math. of O.R. pp. 553–565.
- Gilboa, I.; E. Kalai & E. Zemel (1990). On the Order of Eliminating Dominated Strategies. Vol. 9. Operations Research Letters. pp. 85–89.
- Gilboa, I.; E. Zemel (1989). Nash and Correlated Equilibria: Some Complexity Results. Vol. 1. Games and Economic Behavior. pp. 80–93.
- Hakimi, L.; N. Megiddo & E. Zemel (1983). The Maximum Coverage Location Problem. Vol. 4. SIAM Journal on Discrete and Algebraic Methods. pp. 253–261.
- Hartvigsen, D.; E. Zemel (1992). On the Computational Complexity of Facets and Valid Inequalities for the Knapsack Problem. Vol. 39. Discrete Applied Math. pp. 113–123.
- Hassin, R.; E. Zemel (1984). On Shortest Paths in Graphs with Random Weights. Vol. 10. Mathematics of Operations Research. pp. 557–564.
- Hassin, R.; E. Zemel (1988). Probabilistic Analysis of the Capacitated Transportation Problem. Vol. 13. Mathematics of Operations Research. pp. 80–90.
- Kalai, E.; E. Zemel (c. 1980s). Generalized Network Problems Yielding Totally Balanced Games. Vol. 30. Operations Research. pp. 998–1008.
- Kalai, E.; E. Zemel (1982). On Totally Balanced Games and Games of Flow. Vol. 7. Mathematics of Operations Research. pp. 476–478.
- Kamien, M.; E. Zemel (1994). Tangled Webs: A Note on the Complexity of Compound Lying. Northwestern University.
- Kuno, T.; H. Konno; E. Zemel (1991). A Linear Time Algorithm for Solving Continuous Maximin Knapsack Problems. Vol. 10. O.R. Letters. pp. 23, 27.
- Megiddo, N.; A. Tamir; E. Zemel; R. Chandrasekaran (1981). An (n log2 n) Algorithm for the kth Longest Path in a Tree with Applications to Location Problems. Vol. 13. SIAM Journal on Computing. pp. 328–338.
- Megiddo, N.; E. Zemel (1986). An O(n log n) Randomized Algorithm for the Weighted Euclidean One Center Problem in the Plane. Vol. 7. Journal of Algorithms. pp. 358–368.
- Mitchelle, A. A.; T. E. Morton; E. Zemel (1981). A Discrete Maximum Principle Approach to General Advertising Expenditure Model. Amsterdam: TIMS Studies in Management Science: Marketing, Planning Models (A. Zoltners, ed.); North-Holland Publishing.
- Ocana, C.; E. Zemel (1996). Learning from Mistakes: The JIT Principle. Vol. 49. Operations Research. pp. 206–215.
- Raviv, A.; E. Zemel (1977). Durability of Capital Goods: Market Structure and Taxes. Vol. 45. Econometrica. pp. 703–717.
- Samet, D.; E. Zemel (1984). On the Core and Dual Set of Linear Programming Games. Vol. 9. Mathematics of Operations Research. pp. 309–316.
- Sheopuri, A.; E. Zemel (2008). The Greed and Regret Problem INFORMS doi 10.1287/xxxx.0000.0000 c ○ 0000 INFORMS.
- Tamir, A.; E. Zemel (1982). Locating Centers on a Tree with Discontinuous Supply and Demand Regions. Vol. 7. Mathematics of Operations Research. pp. 183–198.
- Woodruff, D.; E. Zemel (1993). Hashing Vectors for Tabu Search. Vol. 41. Annals of O.R. pp. 123–137.
- Zemel, E. (1989). Easily Computable Facets of the Knapsack Problem. Vol. 14. Mathematics of Operations Research. pp. 760–774.
- Zemel, E. (1978). Lifting the Facets of O-1 Polytopes. Vol. 15. Mathematical Programming. pp. 268–277.
- Zemel, E. (1987). A Linear Time Randomizing Algorithm for Searching Ranked Functions. Vol. 2. Algorithmica. pp. 81–90.
- Zemel, E. (1981). Measuring the Quality of Approximate Solutions to Zero-One Programming Problems. Vol. 13. Mathematics of Operations Research. pp. 319–332.
- Zemel, E. (1984). An O(n) Algorithm for the Multiple Choice Knapsack and Related Problems. Vol. 18. Information Processing Letters. pp. 123–128.
- Zemel, E. (1981). On Search Over Rationals. Vol. 1. Operations Research Letters. pp. 34–38.
- Zemel, E. (c. 1980s). Polynomial Algorithms for Estimating Best Possible Bounds on Network Reliability. Vol. 12. Networks. pp. 439–452.
- Zemel, E. (1984). Probabilistic Analysis of Geometric Location Problems. Vol. 1. Annals of Operations Research. pp. 215–238.
- Zemel, E. (1986). Probabilistic Analysis of Geometric Location Problems (Revised). Vol. 6. SIAM Journal of Discrete and Algebraic Methods. pp. 189–200.
- Zemel, E. (1986). Random Binary Search: A Randomized Algorithm for Optimization in R1. Vol. 11. Mathematics of Operations Research. pp. 651–662.
- Zemel, E. (1989). Small Talk and Cooperation: A Note on Bounded Rationality. Vol. 49. Journal of Economic Theory. pp. 1–9.
- Zemel, E. (1992). Yes, Virginia, There Really Is Total Quality Management. Anheuser-Bush Distinguished Lecture Series, SEI Center for Advanced Studies in Management, The Wharton School.

== Education ==
Zemel received his Bachelor of Science in Mathematics from the Hebrew University of Jerusalem, his Master of Science in Applied Physics from The Weizmann Institute of Science in Israel, and his Doctor of Philosophy in Operations Research from the Graduate School of Business Administration at Carnegie Mellon University.
