= Matthew Chervenak =

American businessman

- Education: Pennsylvania State University (BS in Biology)
- Occupations: Founder, President, and CEO of General Biologic (GBI)
- Known for: Healthcare Committee(Chairman); Sapient Corporation in New York City(Strategist ) New York University Medical Center(Researcher); National Institutes of Health(Researcher)

Matthew Chervenak is an American entrepreneur who has founded several businesses, a nonprofit, and hosts a YouTube Interview Series: Reforming Congress Conversations, on strengthening the US Congress. Chervenak founded and leads The Sunwater Institute, nonprofit nonpartisan public policy think tank, AllSci Corp, a business focused on improving scientific knowledge creation, and Sunwater Capital, an investment firm.

In 2017, Chervenak founded The Sunwater Institute, a nonprofit nonpartisan think tank with a mission to strengthen the foundations of liberal democracy through interdisciplinary science, technology, and open dialogue. The Sunwater Institute is focused on research in four program areas, Congressional Reform, Intellectual Property, Rights and Liberties, and Group Decision Making.

Chervenak founded AllSci Corp in 2023, aiming to reframe the way scientific knowledge is created and shared. AllSci extracts scientific ‘atoms’ from the existing literature and allows scientists to publish ideas and experimental without barrier or delay, moving the peer review process to a continuous, post publication step.

Chervenak is the cofounder of Sunwater Capital, an investment firm focused on real estate, healthcare and data businesses.

Chervenak founded General Biologic (GBI), a Shanghai-based, healthcare focused consulting firm and data company in 2002 and sold it in 2023. He served as the Chairman of the Healthcare Committee at the American Chamber of Commerce (Amcham) in Shanghai. Prior to establishing General Biologic, Chervenak was a strategist at Sapient Corporation in New York City and researcher at New York University Medical Center and the National Institutes of Health. Chervenak graduated with a B.S. in Biology from Pennsylvania State University.

Chervenak regularly contributed to international publications and spoke at industry conferences about China's pharmaceutical and biotechnology sectors from 2002-2012. In a 2005 editorial, Chervenak wrote that China's low-cost, highly skilled technologists and scientists, a strong track record in life-science research, a high-quality talent pool of returnee overseas Chinese, advantageous regulations and tax policy, and China's entrepreneurial culture, all contribute to create a bright future for China's life sciences industry.

Recently, Chervenak was the co-author of a policy report titled Measuring Intellectual Property Rights: Existing Indices, Addressing Gaps and Suggestions for Policymakers.
