= Marsha Berger =

American computer scientist

- Born: 1953 (age 72–73)
- Education: Binghamton University; Stanford University
- Scientific career
- Fields: Numerical analysis, Computational fluid dynamics and Parallel computing
- Workplaces: Courant Institute of Mathematical Sciences.
- Thesis: Adaptive Mesh Refinement for Hyperbolic Partial Differential Equations (1982)

Marsha J. Berger (born 1953) is an American computer scientist. Her areas of research include numerical analysis, computational fluid dynamics, and high-performance parallel computing. She is a Silver Professor (emeritus) of Computer Science and Mathematics in the Courant Institute of Mathematical Sciences of New York University. She is Group Leader of Modeling and Simulation in the Center for Computational Mathematics at the Flatiron Institute.

Berger was elected to the National Academy of Engineering in 2005 for developing adaptive mesh refinement algorithms and software that have advanced engineering applications, especially the analysis of aircraft and spacecraft.

== Education ==
Berger received her B.S. in mathematics from State University of New York at Binghamton-Harpur College in 1974. She went on to receive an M.S. and a Ph.D. in computer science from Stanford University in 1978 and 1982, respectively.

== Career and research ==
Berger's research includes high-performance parallel computing, numerical analysis, and computational fluid dynamics. Specifically she develops software and engineering applications for the spacecraft and aircraft industries. Berger worked at Argonne National Laboratory as a scientific programmer after graduating from SUNY. Her specific duties included developing models for the Energy and Environmental Systems Division. During her time at Stanford, she became associated with the Stanford Linear Accelerator Center. After graduating with her Ph.D., she began working at the Courant Institute of Mathematical Sciences at New York University, first as a postdoc, then as a faculty member. Berger has served as the deputy director of the Courant Institute and still serves as an educator at NYU. She has been a visiting scientist at RIACS/NASA Ames Research Center from 1991 to present.

Berger has pioneered the technique of adaptive mesh refinement which is used in the numerical solution of systems of partial differential equations (PDEs). Her work includes high-performance software and algorithmic innovations and has inspired significant work worldwide. Berger is also known for contributions to Cartesian mesh finite difference methods for numerical PDE's.

== Awards and recognition ==
- National Science Foundation Presidential Young Investigator Award, 1988
- National Science Foundation Faculty Award for Women, 1991
- Elected to the National Academy of Sciences, 2000.
- NASA Software of the Year Award for Cart3D, 2002
- IEEE Sidney Fernbach Award, 2004
- Elected to the National Academy of Engineering, 2005.
- Fellow of Society for Industrial and Applied Mathematics, 2009
- Elected to American Academy of Arts and Sciences, 2011
- Norbert Wiener Prize in Applied Mathematics, 2018

== See also ==
- Adaptive mesh refinement
