= Fanghua Lin =

Chinese-American mathematician

Lin Fanghua
- 林芳華
- Born: March 11, 1959 (age 67); Ningbo, Zhejiang, China
- Citizenship: United States
- Education: Zhejiang University; University of Minnesota
- Known for: Ginzburg–Landau equation liquid crystal behaviour
- Awards: Bôcher Prize (2002)
- Scientific career
- Fields: Analysis
- Workplaces: Courant Institute; University of Chicago

Fanghua Lin (Chinese: 林芳華; pinyin: Lín Fānghuá; born March 11, 1959), also written as Fang-Hua Lin, is a Chinese-born American mathematician. He is currently the Silver Professor at the Courant Institute of Mathematical Sciences at New York University. He applies rigorous analysis to nonlinear systems and is a leader in this field. He was elected a member of the National Academy of Sciences in 2025.

== Biography ==
Lin was born in 1959 in Ningbo, Zhejiang, China, and graduated from the Department of Mathematics of Zhejiang University in 1981. He went to the United States to obtain his PhD from the Department of Mathematics at the University of Minnesota in 1985. From 1985 to 1988, he was an instructor at the Courant Institute of Mathematical Sciences at New York University. Then he went to the University of Chicago, and was a full professor there from 1988 until 1989. In 1989, he started his professorship at New York University. He was awarded the Silver Professorship at the Courant Institute.

Lin made substantial contributions in Ginzburg–Landau theory.

== Awards and honors ==
- 1989–1991, Alfred P. Sloan Research Fellowship
- 1989–1994, Presidential Young Investigator Award
- 1990, invited speaker, International Congress of Mathematicians, Kyoto
- 1999, Ordway Chair Visiting Professor, University of Minnesota
- 2002, Bôcher Memorial Prize, by American Mathematical Society for fundamental contributions to our understanding of the Ginzburg-Landau equations
- 2004, Shiing-shen Chern Prize
- 2004, fellow, American Academy of Arts and Sciences
- 2014, fellow of the American Mathematical Society
- 2022, SIAM Fellow, "for significant contributions to our understanding of the properties of solutions throughout nonlinear partial differential equations"
