= Rita P. Wright =

American anthropologist

Academic background
- Education: Wellesley College
- Alma mater: Harvard University

Academic work
- Discipline: Anthropology
- Sub-discipline: Near East societies, the Indus Civilisation, and gender roles
- Institutions: New York University

Rita P. Wright is an American anthropologist, and professor emeritus at New York University.

She graduated from Wellesley College with a B.A. in 1975 and from Harvard University with an M.A. in 1978 and Ph.D. in 1984. She specializes in Near East societies, the Indus Civilisation and gender roles. She currently teaches the introductory archaeology course, required for the anthropology major at the university.

== Awards ==
- 1988 MacArthur Fellows Program

== Works ==
- The Ancient Indus: Urbanism, Economy and Society, Cambridge University Press, 2009, ISBN 978-0-521-57652-9
- "Third Millennium Changing Times" (2009) - Archaeological Dialogues 16(2):142-148.
- "Gendered relations" in Ur III Dynasty: Kinship, Property and Labor". Gender through Time. Editor Diane R. Bolger, Rowman & Littlefield, 2008, ISBN 978-0-7591-1092-2
- "Exploring Unknown Lands and Bringing New Worlds into Gender Studies", Are all warriors male?: gender roles on the ancient Eurasian Steppe, Editors Katheryn M. Linduff, Karen Sydney Rubinson, Rowman & Littlefield, 2008, ISBN 978-0-7591-1074-8
- Water Supply and History: Harappa and the Beas Settlement Survey (2008). Co-authoried, R. Wright, R. Bryson and J. Schuldenrein. Antiquity, Vol. 82, 315:37-48.
- "Gender Matters -- A Question of Ethics", Ethical issues in archaeology, Editors Larry J. Zimmerman, Karen D. Vitelli, Julie Hollowell-Zimmer, Rowman Altamira, 2003, ISBN 978-0-7591-0271-2
- "Prehistory of Urbanism" (2002) - Encyclopedia of Urbanism, M. and C. Ember, ed., Grolier Press.
- Craft and Social Identity (1998) (with Cathy L. Costin, eds.). Washington D.C. American Anthropological Association, Archaeology Division Monograph 8.
- Gender and Archaeology, Editor Rita P. Wright, University of Pennsylvania Press, 1996, ISBN 978-0-8122-1574-8
- "Women's Labor and Pottery Production in Prehistory", Engendering archaeology: women and prehistory, Editors Joan M. Gero, Margaret Wright Conkey, Wiley-Blackwell, 1991, ISBN 978-0-631-17501-8
