= David J. Pine =

American physicist

- Education: Wheaton College (BS); Cornell University (PhD)
- Occupation: Physicist
- Scientific career
- Fields: Soft matter

David J. Pine is an American physicist who has made contributions in the field of soft matter physics, including studies on colloids, polymers, surfactant systems, and granular materials. He is professor of physics in the New York University College of Arts and Science and chair of the Department of Chemical and Biomolecular Engineering at the NYU Tandon School of Engineering.

== Education ==
Pine received his B.S. in physics and mathematics in 1975 from Wheaton College, and his Ph.D. in physics in 1982 from Cornell University.

== Career ==
Pine was a professor in the Chemical Engineering Department and the Materials Department at the University of California, Santa Barbara (UCSB) for 10 years; he served as chair of the Chemical Engineering Department from 2001 to 2004. He also worked as a research scientist at Exxon Corporate Research in Annandale, New Jersey, and was on the physics faculty at Haverford College near Philadelphia.

== Research ==
He is among the original developers of diffusing-wave spectroscopy, an optical technique used to study colloid systems. Pine's research also includes colloidal self-assembly and the development of various colloids for these applications, including colloidal templating, colloidal clusters, lock-and-key colloids, and patchy colloids with valence. He also discovered Random Organization, a nonequilibrium phase transition.

== Awards and honors ==
Pine has published over 150 articles. His work was recognized with the Society of Rheology Publication of the Year Award in 2000. He was a Guggenheim Fellow from 1999 to 2000 and was elected as a Fellow of the American Physical Society in 1997, the American Association for the Advancement of Science in 2000, and the American Academy of Arts and Sciences in 2018.
