= Youla–Kucera parametrization =

Formulaic parametrization

In control theory, the Youla–Kučera parametrization (also simply known as Youla parametrization) is a formula that describes all possible stabilizing feedback controllers for a given plant P, as function of a single parameter Q.

== Details ==
The YK parametrization is a general result. It is a fundamental result of control theory and launched an entirely new area of research and found application, among others, in optimal and robust control. The engineering significance of the YK formula is that if one wants to find a stabilizing controller that meets some additional criterion, one can adjust the parameter Q such that the desired criterion is met.

For ease of understanding, and as suggested by Kučera, it is best described for three increasingly general kinds of plant.

=== Stable SISO plant ===
Let $P(s)$ be a transfer function of a stable single-input single-output system (SISO) system. Further, let $\Omega$ be a set of stable and proper functions of $s$. Then, the set of all proper stabilizing controllers for the plant $P(s)$ can be defined as

$$\left\{ \frac{Q(s)}{1 - P(s)Q(s)}, Q(s)\in \Omega \right\}$$,

where $Q(s)$ is an arbitrary proper and stable function of s. It can be said, that $Q(s)$ parametrizes all stabilizing controllers for the plant $P(s)$.

=== General SISO plant ===
Consider a general plant with a transfer function $P(s)$. Further, the transfer function can be factorized as

$P(s)=\frac{N(s)}{M(s)}$, where $M(s)$, $N(s)$ are stable and proper functions of s.

Now, solve the Bézout's identity of the form

$\mathbf{N(s)Y(s)} + \mathbf{M(s)X(s)} = \mathbf{1}$,

where the variables to be found $(X(s), Y(s))$ must be also proper and stable.

After proper and stable $X, Y$ are found, we can define one stabilizing controller that is of the form $C(s)=\frac{Y(s)}{X(s)}$. After we have one stabilizing controller at hand, we can define all stabilizing controllerd usind a parameted $Q(s)$ that is proper and stable. The set of all stabilizing controllerd is defined as

$$\left\{ \frac{Y(s)+M(s)Q(s)}{X(s) - N(s)Q(s)}, Q(s) \in \Omega \right\}$$.

=== General MIMO plant ===
In a multiple-input multiple-output (MIMO) system, consider a transfer matrix $\mathbf{P(s)}$. It can be factorized using right coprime factors $\mathbf{P(s)=N(s)D^{-1}(s)}$ or left factors $\mathbf{P(s)=\tilde{D}^{-1}(s)\tilde{N}(s)}$. The factors must be proper, stable and doubly coprime, which ensures that the system $\mathbf{P(s)}$ is controllable and observable. This can be written by Bézout identity of the form:

$$\left[ \begin{matrix}
\mathbf{X} & \mathbf{Y}  \\
-\mathbf{\tilde{N}} & {\mathbf{\tilde{D}}}  \\
\end{matrix} \right]\left[ \begin{matrix}
\mathbf{D} & -\mathbf{\tilde{Y}}  \\
\mathbf{N} & {\mathbf{\tilde{X}}}  \\
\end{matrix} \right]=\left[ \begin{matrix}
\mathbf{I} & 0  \\
0 & \mathbf{I}  \\
\end{matrix} \right]$$.

After finding $\mathbf{X, Y, \tilde{X}, \tilde{Y}}$ that are stable and proper, we can define the set of all stabilizing controllers $\mathbf{K(s)}$ using left or right factor, provided having negative feedback.

$$\begin{align}
& \mathbf{K(s)}={{\left( \mathbf{X}-\mathbf{\Delta\tilde{N}} \right)}^{-1}}\left( \mathbf{Y}+\mathbf{\Delta\tilde{D}} \right) \\
& =\left( \mathbf{\tilde{Y}}+\mathbf{D\Delta} \right){{\left( \mathbf{\tilde{X}}-\mathbf{N\Delta} \right)}^{-1}}
\end{align}$$

where $\Delta$ is an arbitrary stable and proper parameter.

Let $P(s)$ be the transfer function of the plant and let $K_0(s)$ be a stabilizing controller. Let their right coprime factorizations be:

$$\mathbf{P(s)}= \mathbf{N} \mathbf{M}^{-1}$$
$$\mathbf{K_0(s)} = \mathbf{U} \mathbf{V}^{-1}$$

then all stabilizing controllers can be written as

$$\mathbf{K(s)} = (\mathbf{U}+\mathbf{M} \mathbf{Q}) (\mathbf{V}+\mathbf{N} \mathbf{Q})^{-1}$$

where $Q$ is stable and proper.
