= Margaret H. Wright =

American computer scientist and applied mathematician (b. 1944)

Professor Margaret H. Wright
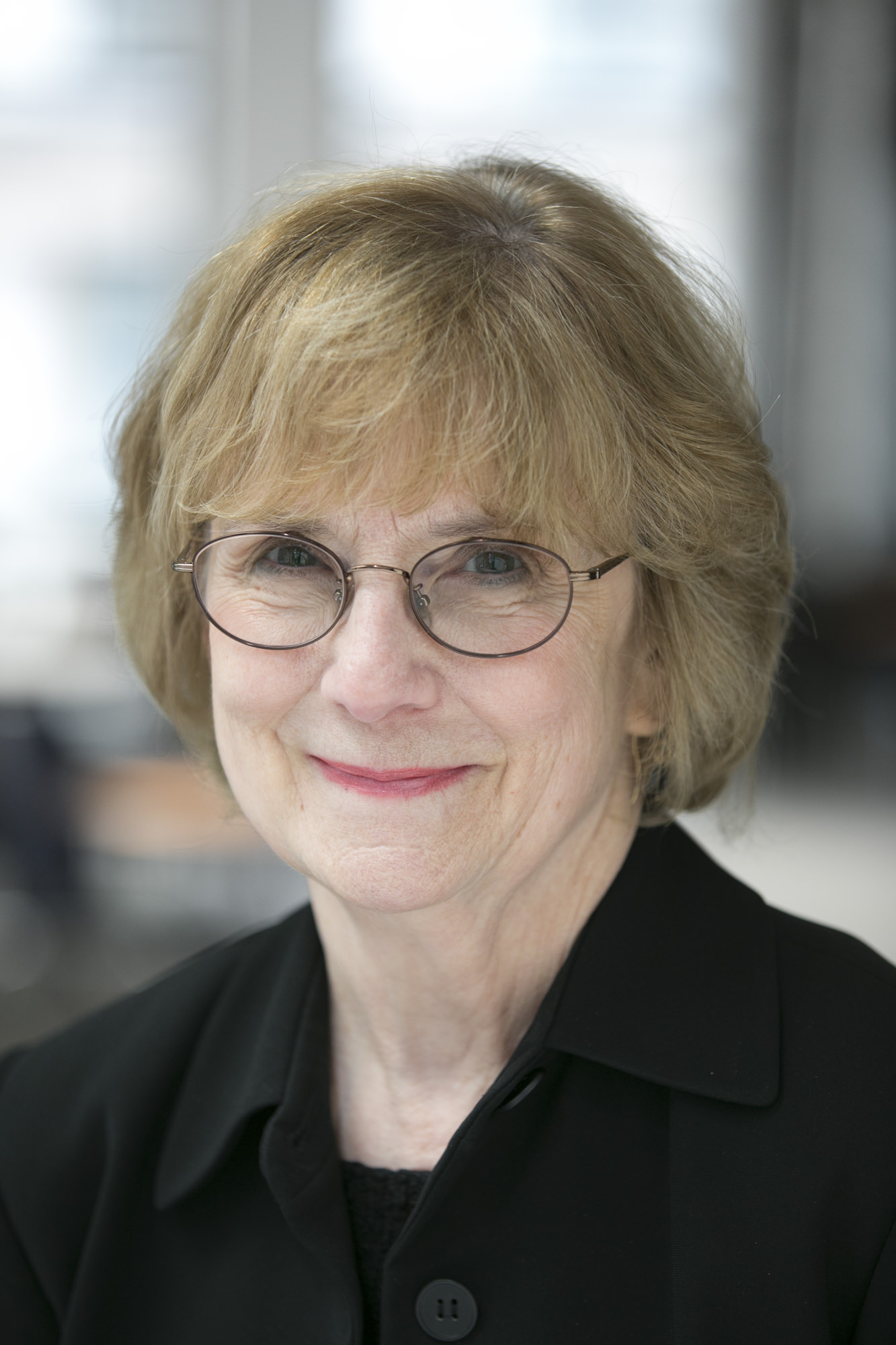
- Born: February 18, 1944 (age 82); San Francisco, United States
- Education: B.S. in Mathematics, M.S., Ph.D. in Computer Science
- Alma mater: Stanford University
- Occupation: Computer scientist
- Awards: Member of the National Academy of Sciences; Member of the National Academy of Engineering; Fellow of the American Mathematical Society; President of the Society for Industrial and Applied Mathematics (1995-1996); Bell Labs Fellow; Editor-in-Chief of SIAM Review (1999-2004)
- Scientific career
- Fields: Optimization, Linear Algebra, Scientific Computing
- Institutions: NYU Courant, Bell Laboratories, Stanford University (Systems Optimization Laboratory), GTE Sylvania
- Thesis: Numerical Methods for Nonlinearly Constrained Optimization (1976)
- Doctoral advisor: Gene H. Golub, Walter Murray
- Website: cs.nyu.edu/~mhw/

Margaret H. Wright (born February 18, 1944) is an American computer scientist and mathematician. She is a Silver Professor of Computer Science and former chair of the Computer Science department at Courant Institute of Mathematical Sciences, New York University, with research interests in optimization, linear algebra, and scientific computing. She was elected to the National Academy of Engineering in 1997 for development of numerical optimization algorithms and for leadership in the applied mathematics community. She was elected to the National Academy of Sciences in 2005. She was the first woman to serve as President of the Society for Industrial and Applied Mathematics.

== Early life and education ==
Wright was born in San Francisco in 1944, and spent her early childhood in Hanford, California. Both of her parents were medical doctors. At age 10, her family moved to Tucson, Arizona, where she attended junior and high school. She graduated high school in 1960 at the age of 16. She excelled in school, especially in mathematics.

She went to college at Stanford University, one of the few top-ranked universities that accepted women at that time. She was interested in numerous subjects including literature, French, history, and mathematics, and she decided to major in mathematics thanks to some advice that a degree in mathematics would lead to better job opportunities than a degree in English or history. She planned to have a job because her mother had always worked.

She received a B.S. degree in mathematics from Stanford University in 1964. She completed an M.S. in computer science from Stanford University in 1965.

After completing her M.S., she worked at GTE Sylvania from 1965 to 1971, where she wrote software to implement mathematical simulations. As part of this work, she learned about optimization methods such as the newly published Fletcher-Powell method and linear programming. At that time, it was legal for employers to discriminate against women, and she was earning significantly less than men with lower qualifications. For this and other reasons, she decided to return to Stanford in 1971 to earn her Ph.D.

Wright entered the Ph.D. program in computer science at Stanford University in 1971 and was supported by an assistantship from Gene H. Golub. During her Ph.D. studies, Philip E. Gill and Walter Murray, two researchers from the National Physical Laboratory (United Kingdom), came to visit and ended up having a profound impact on her Ph.D. and career. She served as a teaching assistant for a course taught by Walter Murray and got to know him. When Gill and Murray returned to the UK, she went as well for six months and did much of her dissertation research during this period. She returned to Stanford and obtaining her Ph.D. in 1976. Her thesis was on numerical methods for nonlinearly constrained optimization.

== Scientific career ==
After obtaining her Ph.D. in 1976, Wright joined George Dantzig's Systems Optimization Laboratory (SOL) in the Department of Operations Research at Stanford University as a Senior Research Associate. She was eventually joined at SOL by Gill Murray and Philip Gill, whom she had worked with when she was a graduate student, and Michael Saunders. They were known as the "Gang of Four" and published many scientific papers together, always using alphabetical order of their names. In 1984, Karmarkar's algorithm was announced as a polynomial-time algorithm for linear programs, and he came to visit Stanford and present the work. It was immediately clear to the Gang of Four and John Tomlin that this was a special case of barrier methods (the subject of Wright's thesis), and that barrier methods were much more useful than previously believed.

In 1988, Wright moved east and joined Bell Labs, where she was ultimately promoted to Distinguished Member of the Technical Staff. She headed the Scientific Computing Research Department from 1997 to 2000. She was named a Bell Labs Fellow in 1999. Wright was involved in a number of projects during her years at Bell Labs. She worked in wireless systems engineering. She also investigated the popular Nelder–Mead method for derivative-free numerical optimization.

In 2001, Wright joined the Courant Institute of Mathematical Sciences as the Silver Professor of Computer Science and a professor of mathematics. She served as Chair of Computer Science from 2001 to 2009.

=== Professional Service ===
Wright has several in numerous service roles including chairing and serving on prize and search committees, serving on a variety of national and international advisory committees, chairing several important reviews, etc. Highlights include the following:

From 1995 to 1996, she served as the (first female) president of the Society for Industrial and Applied Mathematics (SIAM). She served on the SIAM Board of Trustees from 2000 to 2005 and its council from 1987 to 1989. She was SIAM Vice President at-large from 1990 to 1993.

From 1999 to 2004, she was editor-in-chief of SIAM Review.

In 2010, she chaired the UK International Review of the Mathematical Sciences, Engineering and Physical Sciences Research Council.

=== Awards and Recognitions ===
In 1997, she was elected to the National Academy of Engineering.

In 1998, she was delivered the Etta Z. Falconer Lecture, an award from the Association for Women in Mathematics that honors "women who have made distinguished contributions to the mathematical sciences or mathematics education."

In 2000, she was selected to deliver the Noether Lecture, an award of the Association for Women in Mathematics honoring "women who have made fundamental and sustained contributions to the mathematical sciences."

In 2001, she was elected a member of the American Academy of Arts and Sciences.

In 2000, she received the SIAM Award for Distinguished Service to the Profession.

In 2002, she received the AMS Award for Distinguished Public Service.

In 2002, she became a Fellow of the Institute for Operations Research and the Management Sciences.

In 2003, she received an honorary doctorate (D. Math) from the University of Waterloo.

In 2005, she was elected to the National Academy of Sciences.

In 2008, she was awarded an Honorary Doctor of Technology by the Royal Institute of Technology (KTH), Sweden.

In 2009, she became a Fellow of the Society for Industrial and Applied Mathematics (SIAM).

In 2012, she became a fellow of the American Mathematical Society.

In 2013, she was named an honorary member of the London Mathematical Society.

In 2016, she was named a Senior Fellow in the Simons Society of Fellows.

In 2019, she was awarded the John von Neumann Prize "in recognition of her pioneering contributions to the numerical solution of optimization problems and to the exposition of the subject." Her prize lecture was presented at ICIAM in Valencia, Spain on July 16, 2019.

== Publications ==
A list of her selected publications includes

- P. E. Gill, W. Murray, and M. H. Wright, Practical Optimization, Academic Press, 1981, ISBN 0201126494 (republished by SIAM in 2019)
- P. E. Gill, W. Murray, M. A. Saunders, J. A. Tomlin, and M. H. Wright, On projected newton barrier methods for linear programming and an equivalence to Karmarkar's projective method, Mathematical Programming, Vol. 36, No. 2, pp. 183–209, June 1986, doi:10.1007/BF02592025
- P. E. Gill, W. Murray, and M. H. Wright, Numerical Linear Algebra and Optimization, Addison-Wesley, 1991, ISBN 0122839528 (republished by SIAM in 2021)
- M. H. Wright, Interior methods for constrained optimization, Acta Numerica, Vol. 1, pp. 341–407, January 1992, doi:10.1017/S0962492900002300
- J. C. Lagarias, J. A. Reeds, M. H. Wright, and P. E. Wright, Convergence properties of the Nelder—Mead simplex method in low dimensions, SIAM Journal on Optimization, Vol. 9, No. 1, pp. 112–147, January 1998, doi:10.1007/BF02592025
- A. Forsgren, P. E. Gill, and M. H. Wright, Interior Methods for Nonlinear Optimization, SIAM Review, Vol. 44, No. 4, pp. 525–597, January 2002, doi:10.1137/S0036144502414942
- M. Wright, The interior-point revolution in optimization: History, recent developments, and lasting consequences, Bulletin of the American Mathematical Society, Vol. 42, No. 1, pp. 39–56, September 2004, doi:10.1090/S0273-0979-04-01040-7
