= Lai-Sang Young =

American mathematician

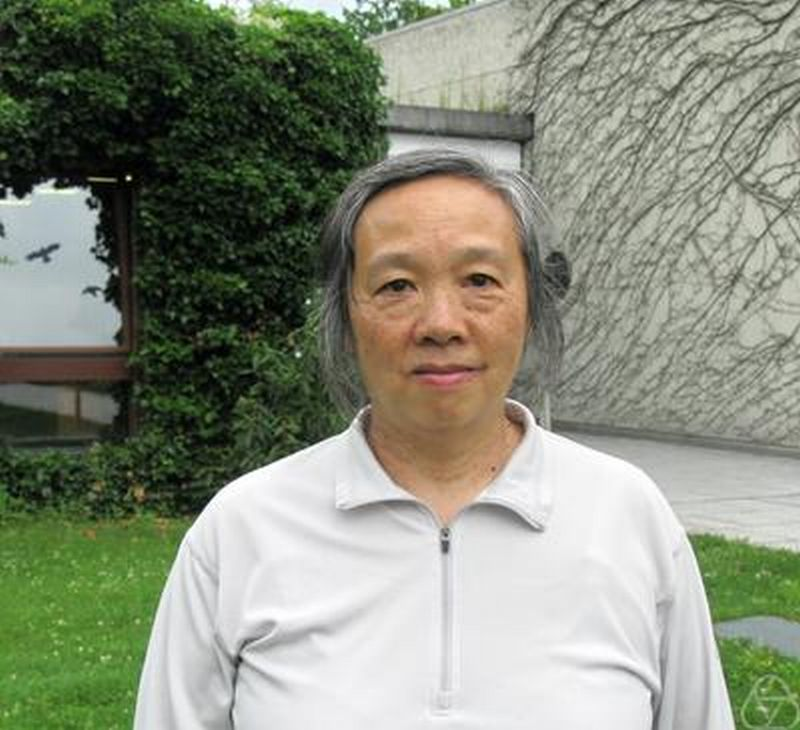
Lai-Sang Young in Oberwolfach, 2009

Lai-Sang Lily Young (Chinese: 楊麗笙, born 1952) is a Hong Kong-born American mathematician who holds the Henry & Lucy Moses Professorship of Science and is a professor of mathematics and neural science at the Courant Institute of Mathematical Sciences of New York University. Her research interests include dynamical systems, ergodic theory, chaos theory, probability theory, statistical mechanics, and neuroscience. She is particularly known for introducing the method of Markov returns in 1998, which she used to prove exponential correlation delay in Sinai billiards and other hyperbolic dynamical systems.

== Education and career ==
Although born and raised in Hong Kong, Young came to the US for her education, earning a bachelor's degree from the University of Wisconsin–Madison in 1973. She moved to the University of California, Berkeley for her graduate studies, earning a master's degree in 1976 and completing her doctorate in 1978, under the supervision of Rufus Bowen. She taught at Northwestern University from 1979 to 1980, Michigan State University from 1980 to 1986, the University of Arizona from 1987 to 1990, and the University of California, Los Angeles from 1991 to 1999. She has been the Moses Professor at NYU since 1999.

== Awards and honors ==
Young became a Sloan Fellow in 1985, and a Guggenheim Fellow in 1997.

In 1993, Young was given the Ruth Lyttle Satter Prize in Mathematics of the American Mathematical Society "for her leading role in the investigation of the statistical (or ergodic) properties of dynamical systems". This is a biennial award for outstanding research contributions by a female mathematician.

In 2004, she was elected as a fellow of the American Academy of Arts and Sciences.

Young was an invited speaker at the International Congress of Mathematicians in 1994, and an invited plenary speaker at the 2018 International Congress of Mathematicians. In 2005, she presented the Noether Lecture of the Association for Women in Mathematics; her talk was entitled "From Limit Cycles to Strange Attractors". In 2007, she presented the Sonia Kovalevsky lecture, jointly sponsored by the AWM and the Society for Industrial and Applied Mathematics.

In 2020 she was elected a member of the National Academy of Sciences. She is the recipient of the 2021 Jürgen Moser Lecture prize "for her sustained and deep contributions to the theory of non-uniformly hyperbolic dynamical systems." In 2023, she was awarded the Heinz Hopf Prize and in 2024 the Rolf Schock Prize.

== Selected publications ==
- Block, Louis; Guckenheimer, John; Misiurewicz, Michał; Young, Lai Sang (1980), "Periodic points and topological entropy of one-dimensional maps", Global theory of dynamical systems (Proc. Internat. Conf., Northwestern Univ., Evanston, Ill., 1979), Lecture Notes in Mathematics, vol. 819, Berlin: Springer, pp. 18–34, doi:10.1007/BFb0086977, ISBN 978-3-540-10236-6, MR 0591173.
- Young, Lai Sang (1982), "Dimension, entropy and Lyapunov exponents", Ergodic Theory and Dynamical Systems, 2 (1): 109–124, doi:10.1017/S0143385700009615, MR 0684248.
- Benedicks, Michael; Young, Lai-Sang (1993), "Sinaĭ–Bowen–Ruelle measures for certain Hénon maps", Inventiones Mathematicae, 112 (3): 541–576, Bibcode:1993InMat.112..541B, doi:10.1007/BF01232446, MR 1218323, S2CID 18642732.
- Young, Lai-Sang (1998), "Statistical properties of dynamical systems with some hyperbolicity", Annals of Mathematics, Second Series, 147 (3): 585–650, doi:10.2307/120960, JSTOR 120960, MR 1637655.
- Young, Lai-Sang (1999), "Recurrence times and rates of mixing", Israel Journal of Mathematics, 110: 153–188, doi:10.1007/BF02808180, MR 1750438, S2CID 17557828.
- Wang, Qiudong; Young, Lai-Sang (2001), "Strange attractors with one direction of instability", Communications in Mathematical Physics, 218 (1): 1–97, Bibcode:2001CMaPh.218....1W, doi:10.1007/s002200100379, MR 1824198, S2CID 120611205.
- Young, Lai-Sang (2002), "What are SRB measures, and which dynamical systems have them?", Journal of Statistical Physics, 108 (5–6): 733–754, Bibcode:2002JSP...108..733Y, doi:10.1023/A:1019762724717, MR 1933431, S2CID 14403405.
