= Michael Shelley (mathematician) =

American mathematician

Michael J. Shelley
- Born: August 17, 1959 (age 67); Colorado, United States
- Education: University of Arizona; University of Colorado
- Scientific career
- Fields: Mathematics; Applied Mathematics
- Workplaces: Courant Institute of Mathematical Sciences; Flatiron Institute

Michael J. Shelley (born August 17, 1959) is an American applied mathematician who works on the modeling and simulation of complex systems arising in physics and biology. This has included free-boundary problems in fluids and materials science, singularity formation in partial differential equations, modeling visual perception in the primary visual cortex, dynamics of complex and active fluids, cellular biophysics, and fluid-structure interaction problems such as the flapping of flags, stream-lining in nature, and flapping flight. He is also the co-founder and co-director of the Courant Institute's Applied Mathematics Lab.

Shelley was born in La Junta, Colorado. He holds a BA in mathematics from the University of Colorado (1981) and a PhD in Applied Mathematics from the University of Arizona (1985). He was a postdoctoral researcher at Princeton University, and then joined the faculty of mathematics at the University of Chicago. In 1992 he joined the Courant Institute of Mathematical Sciences at New York University where he is the George and Lilian Lyttle Professor of Applied Mathematics as well as Professor of Neuroscience (NYU) and Professor of Mechanical Engineering (NYU-Tandon). In 2016 he also became a senior research scientist and group leader in biophysical modeling at the Center for Computational Biology (CCB) of the Flatiron Institute, a division of the Simons Foundation. In 2019 he was appointed Director of CCB.

== Honors ==
- 1983 NASA Computational Fluid Dynamics Fellowship
- 1989 National Science Foundation Mathematical Sciences Postdoctoral Fellowship
- 1991 National Science Foundation Presidential Young Investigator
- 1998 Francois Frenkiel Award of the American Physical Society
- 2001 Distinguished Chair of the Pacific Institute of Mathematical Sciences
- 2006 The Richard C. DiPrima Lecture, Rensselaer Polytechnic Institute
- 2006 Julian Cole Lectureship, Society of Industrial and Applied Mathematics
- 2007 Appointed the Lilian and George Lyttle Professor of Applied Mathematics, Courant Institute of Mathematical Sciences, NYU
- 2007 Elected Fellow of the American Physical Society
- 2009 Inaugural Fellow of the Society of Industrial and Applied Mathematics
- 2012 The Librescu Memorial Lecture, Virginia Tech College of Engineering
- 2014 The Pelz Memorial Lecture, Rutgers University, Mechanical Engineering
- 2015 The AMSI-ANZIAM Lecturer, Australia
- 2015 Plenary Speaker, National Meeting of the Australian Mathematical Society
- 2017 The Reiss Memorial Lectures, University of Delaware
- 2019 Elected Fellow of the American Academy of Arts and Sciences
- 2022 Elected Member of the National Academy of Sciences
