= E. Frances White =

American historian

E. Frances White (born 1949) is an American historian, author and academic serving as professor emerita of History and Black Studies at Gallatin School of Individualized Study. From 2005 to 2008 she served as Vice Provost of Faculty Affairs at New York University. Prior to that post, she was the Dean of New York University's Gallatin School of Individualized Study (1998–2005).

She also taught at Hampshire College from 1980 to 1998/99. She holds a B.A. from Wheaton College (1971), an M.A. in African History from Boston University (1973), as well as a Ph.D. from Boston University (1978).

== Publications ==
- Dark continent of our bodies: Black feminism & politics of respectability (2010)
- Jackie Ormes: The First African American Woman Cartoonist (2009)
- While the World Watched (2007)
- The Evidence of Things Not Seen: The Alchemy of Race and Sexuality (2006)
- Africa, as the Women Tell It (Book review, 2006)
- Black feminist interventions (2001)
- Listening to the Voices of Black Feminism (1997, with many others)
- Gender, culture and empire-European women in colonial Nigeria (Book review, 1991)
- Africa on my mind: Gender, counter discourse and African-American nationalism (1990)
- Women in sub-Saharan Africa: restoring women to history (1990, with I Berger and C Skidmore-Hess)
- The Circumcision of Women: A Strategy for Eradication (1989)
- Women in West and West-Central Africa (1988)
- Restoring Women to History: Teaching Packets for Integrating Women's History Into Courses on Africa, Asia, Latin America, the Caribbean and the Middle East (1988, with Iris Berger, Barbara Ramusack, Sharon Sievers, Marysa Navarro, Virginia S Korrol, Guity Nashat, and Judith E Tucker)
- Sierra Leone's Settler Women Traders: Women on the Afro-European Frontier (1987)
- Beauty Secrets (1987)
- Labour and Parastatal Politics in Sierra Leone: A Study of African Working-Class Ambivalence (1986)
- Listening to the voices of Black feminism (1984)
- Thomas George Lawson: African Historian and Administrator in Sierra Leone (1982)
- Women, work and ethnicity: the Sierra Leone case (1982)
- Women's production outside the development process (1982)
- Creole women traders in the nineteenth century (1981)
- A Black Feminist in Africa (1981)
- The Big Market in Freetown: a case study of women's workplace (1980)
- Creole Women Traders in the Nineteenth Century: Worker Intelligence Networks in Lourenço Marques, 1900-1962 (1980)
- Creole women traders in Sierra Leone: an economic and social history, 1792-1945 (1978)
