= Charles S. Peskin =

American mathematician

- Born: April 15, 1946 (age 80); New York City, US
- Education: Harvard University; Albert Einstein College of Medicine, Yeshiva University
- Known for: Immersed Boundary Method
- Scientific career
- Fields: Mathematics
- Workplaces: Courant Institute of Mathematical Sciences, New York University
- Thesis: Flow patterns around heart valves: A digital computer method for solving the equations of motion (1972)
- Doctoral advisor: Alexandre Chorin

Charles Samuel Peskin (born April 15, 1946) is an American mathematician known for his work in the mathematical modeling of blood flow in the heart. Such calculations are useful in the design of artificial heart valves. From this work has emerged an original computational method for fluid-structure interaction that is now called the “immersed boundary method", which allows the coupling between deformable immersed structures and fluid flows to be handled in a computationally tractable way. With his students and colleagues, Peskin also has worked on mathematical models of such systems as the inner ear, arterial pulse, blood clotting, congenital heart disease, light adaptation in the retina, control of ovulation number, control of plasmid replication, molecular dynamics, and molecular motors.

Peskin received an A.B. (1968) from Harvard University and a Ph.D. (1972) from the Albert Einstein College of Medicine, Yeshiva University and shortly thereafter joined the faculty of the Courant Institute of Mathematical Sciences, New York University. He has been a productive educator of applied mathematicians, and has advised more than fifty graduate students as of 2014. Peskin is a MacArthur Fellow and a member of the National Academy of Sciences, the Institute of Medicine and the American Academy of Arts and Sciences.

In 1969 he married Lucille G. Bisesi. Their son Eric is the manager of High Performance Computing at New York University.

== Publications ==
- Peskin, Charles S. (1975). Mathematical Aspects of Heart Physiology. Courant Institute of Mathematical Sciences.
- Peskin, Charles S. (1976). Partial Differential Equations in Biology. Courant Institute of Mathematical Sciences.
- Hoppensteadt, F. C.; Peskin, C. S. (2002) [1992]. Modeling and Simulation in Medicine and the Life Sciences. Texts in Applied Mathematics. Vol. 10 (2 ed.). Springer-Verlag.

== Awards and honors ==
- George David Birkhoff Prize in Applied Mathematics from AMS–SIAM, 2003
- Invited speaker of the International Congress of Mathematicians, 1998
- Mayor's Award for Excellence in Science and Technology, 1994
- Sidney Fernbach Award, Institute of Electrical and Electronics Engineers Computer Society, 1994
- Cray Research Information Technology Leadership Award for Breakthrough Computational Science, 1994
- Josiah Willard Gibbs Lecturer, American Mathematical Society, 1993
- New York University Margaret and Herman Sokol Faculty Award in the Sciences, 1992
- James H. Wilkinson Prize in Numerical Analysis and Scientific Computing, SIAM, 1985
- MacArthur Fellowship, 1983–1988

He has also been a fellow of the American Academy of Arts and Sciences since 1994, a member of the National Academy of Sciences since 1995, and a member of the Institute of Medicine (now the National Academy of Medicine) since 2000. He is also an inaugural fellow of the American Mathematical Society and the Society for Industrial and Applied Mathematics.

== See also ==
- Cardiac skeleton
- Immersed boundary method
