= Charles M. Newman =

American mathematician (born 1946)

Charles Michael "Chuck" Newman (born 1 March 1946) is a mathematician and a physicist at the Courant Institute of Mathematical Sciences of New York University. He works in the fields of mathematical physics, statistical mechanics, and probability theory.

He has contributed to numerous fields where probability mixes with physics, including metastability, spin glasses, the mathematics of food webs and the Ising model, and percolation theory including its connections to Schramm–Loewner evolutions and the Brownian web. His work on real zeros of Fourier transforms is intimately associated with the Riemann hypothesis, via the De Bruijn-Newman constant.

He is a member of the National Academy of Sciences since 2004, and of the American Academy of Arts and Sciences since 2006. According to his citation for membership of the National Academy of Sciences, he is "an agile and creative probabilist" who "has made deep, unusually insightful contributions over a wide range of science. He is most widely known for his work in disordered systems, including percolation models, random networks and spin glasses. His contributions combine conceptual penetration with technical virtuosity".

In 2012, he became a fellow of the American Mathematical Society.

Newman graduated from MIT in 1966 with degrees in both mathematics and physics. He completed his PhD at Princeton University in 1971 with advisor Arthur Wightman. After two years as an assistant professor at NYU, he accepted a position at Indiana University. In 1979, he moved to the University of Arizona in Tucson, and then in 1989 to the Courant Institute. He was chair of the Mathematics Department from 1998–2001, and Director of the Institute from 2002–2006. His students at NYU have included Seema Nanda. He is married with two daughters.

== Selected books ==
- Charles M. Newman (23 September 1997). Topics in Disordered Systems. Springer Science & Business Media. ISBN 978-3-7643-5777-1.
- Joel E. Cohen; Frédéric Briand; Charles M. Newman (6 December 2012). Community Food Webs: Data and Theory. Springer Science & Business Media. ISBN 978-3-642-83784-5. (pbk reprint of 1990 original)
- Daniel L. Stein; Charles M. Newman (15 January 2013). Spin Glasses and Complexity. Princeton University Press. ISBN 978-1-4008-4563-7.
