= Richard J. Cole =

American computer scientist

- Born: 24 May 1957 (age 69); Oxford, England
- Education: University College, Oxford (BA); Cornell University (PhD)
- Relatives: G. D. H. Cole (grandfather); Margaret Cole (grandmother)
- Awards: Fellow of the ACM (1998)
- Scientific career
- Fields: Design and analysis of algorithms
- Workplaces: Courant Institute of Mathematical Sciences, New York University
- Doctoral advisor: John E. Hopcroft
- Website: cs.nyu.edu/cole/

Richard J. Cole is a Silver professor of computer science at the Courant Institute of Mathematical Sciences, New York University, and works on the design and analysis of computer algorithms.

== Research ==
His research areas include algorithmic economic market theory and game theory, string and pattern matching, amortization, parallelism, and network and routing problems. His notable research contributions include an optimal parallel algorithm for sorting in the PRAM model, and an optimal analysis of the Boyer–Moore string-search algorithm.
