= Richard Bonneau =

American computational biologist and data scientist

Richard Bonneau is an American computational biologist and data scientist whose primary research focuses on using machine learning and computation to accelerate drug discovery. He led AI for Drug Discovery at Genentech and Roche (a global function supporting development and application of machine learning across the portfolio). He left Genentech in October 2026.

His past work, at NYU and the University of Washington in Seattle, focused on learning networks from functional genomics data, predicting and designing protein and peptiodomimetic structure and applying data science to social networks. A professor at New York University, he holds appointments in the department of biology, the Center for Data Science and the Courant Institute of Mathematical Sciences.

== Biography ==
Bonneau was Vice-President, AI for Drug Discovery at Genentech and Roche until 2026, and was previously Group leader for the Systems Biology group in the center for computational biology at the Flatiron Institute. He was previously director of New York University Center for Data Science.

== Scientific work ==
In the area of structure prediction, Bonneau was one of the early authors on the Rosetta code, one of the first codes to demonstrate the ability to predict protein structure in the absence of sequence homology. Using IBM's World Community Grid to carry out folding of whole proteomes, his group has also applied structure prediction to the problem of genome and proteome annotation.

His group has made key contributions to the areas of genomics data analysis, focusing on two primary areas: 1. methods for network inference that uncover dynamics and topology from data and 2. methods that learn condition dependent co-regulated groups from integrations of different genomics data-types.

In 2013, he and his colleagues at NYU started a project to examine the impact of social media use on political attitudes and participation by applying methods from a range of academic disciplines. The project-- Social Media and Political Participation (SMaPP) --relies on both survey data and publicly available social media data to address a range of questions concerning the causal processes that shape political participation. This work continues at NYU under the leadership of Joshua Tucker and Jonathan Nagler.

== Network inference and systems biology ==
Along with Vestienn Thorsson, David Reiss and Nitin Baliga he developed the Inferelator and cMonkey, two algorithms that were critical to an effort to learn a genome-wide model of the Halobacterium regulatory network. Baliga and Bonneau used their model to predict the genome-wide transcriptional dynamics of the cell’s response to new environments (publication in Cell in December 2007). This work represents the first fully data driven reconstruction of a cells regulatory network to include learning of kinetic/dynamical parameters as well as network topology.
