= Lawrence Amos McLouth =

American scholar

Lawrence Amos McLouth, A.B., LL.D. (1863–1927) was an American Germanic scholar.

== Early life ==
McLouth was born in Ontonagon, Michigan He graduated from the University of Michigan in 1887, as a member of the Zeta Psi fraternity.

== Career ==
McLouth served as principal of the Danville, Illinois High School for three years, then proceeded to Europe for additional training, studying for two years at Leipzig, Heidelberg, and Munich. He returned to the University of Michigan as instructor in German.

In 1895, McLouth became professor of Germanic languages and literatures at New York University (NYU). He collaborated with Oswald Ottendorfer to establish a Germanic library at NYU and also helped to establish the Ottendorfer Memorial Scholarship. He served on the administrative committee for this scholarship fund.

He edited Huldrych Zwingli's sermons (1902) and some of the novels of Friedrich Gerstäcker (1904) and Paul Johann Ludwig von Heyse (1910). He published The Teaching of Foreign Literature (1903) and Verses (1910).

== Death ==
McLouth died on February 24, 1927, in New York City.
