= K. R. Sreenivasan =

Indian-American scientist and physicist

Katepalli R. Sreenivasan
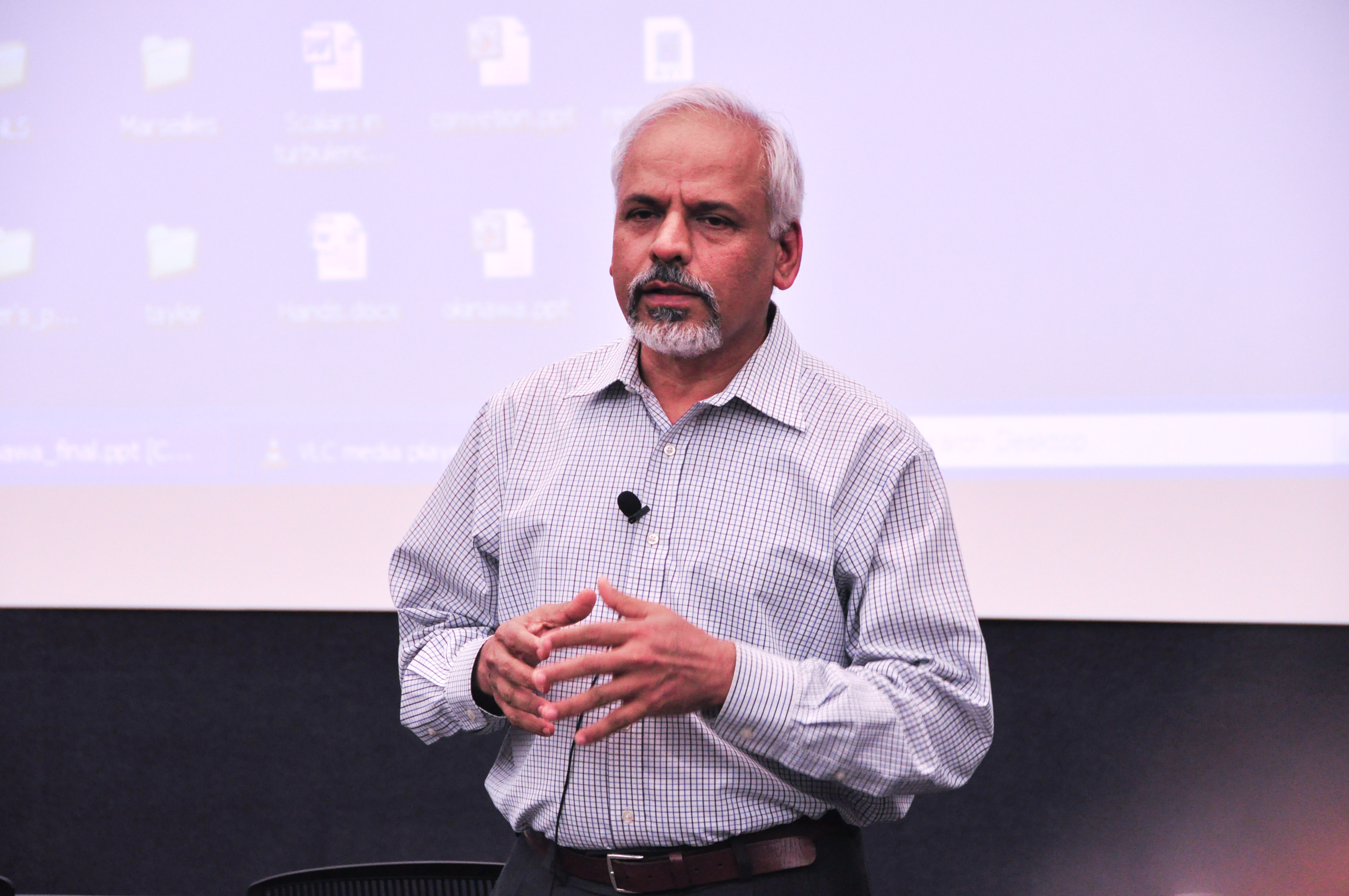
- Born: 30 September 1947 (age 78)
- Citizenship: American; Indian (formerly)
- Education: University of Visvesvaraya College of Engineering; Indian Institute of Science
- Scientific career
- Fields: Physics; Engineering; Applied Mathematics
- Workplaces: Yale University; University of Maryland, College Park; International Centre for Theoretical Physics, Trieste, Italy; New York University
- Thesis: Mechanism Of Reversion In Highly Accelerated Turbulent Boundary Layers (1975)
- Doctoral advisor: Roddam Narasimha

Katepalli Raju Sreenivasan is an aerospace scientist, fluid dynamicist, and applied physicist. He studies turbulence, nonlinear and statistical physics, astrophysical fluid mechanics, and cryogenic helium. He was the dean of engineering and executive vice provost for science and technology of New York University. Sreenivasan is also the Eugene Kleiner Professor for Innovation in Mechanical Engineering at New York University Tandon School of Engineering and a professor of physics and mathematics professor at the New York University Graduate School of Arts and Science and Courant Institute of Mathematical Sciences.

== Education ==
Sreenivasan earned his bachelor's degree in mechanical engineering from University of Visvesvaraya College of Engineering (UVCE), then affiliated to Bangalore University, in 1968. He attended the Indian Institute of Science, Bangalore, where he was awarded a master's degree in 1970 and a doctorate in aerospace engineering in 1975. His post-doctoral research was at the University of Sydney, the University of Newcastle, and Johns Hopkins University. Sreenivasan was awarded a Honoris Causa master's degree from Yale University in 1985. In 2006, he was awarded an Honoris Causa doctorate from University of Lucknow. He received an Honoris Causa doctorate from the University of Hyderabad in 2007 and the Romanian Academy in 2008.

== Career ==
In 1979, he joined the faculty at Yale University, New Haven, Connecticut as an assistant professor. In 1985, he became a full professor. Sreenivasan became chairman of Mechanical Engineering in 1987. He became the Harold W. Cheel professor of mechanical engineering in 1988. In 1989, Sreenivasan was named acting chairman of the council of engineering. He became the Andrew W. Mellon Professor in 1991. He also served as a professor of physics, applied physics, and mathematics. In 1991, Sreenivasan was appointed to the Society of Scholars for Johns Hopkins University. At the American Physical Society (APS), he served as the chair of the Division of Fluid Dynamics, and the founding chairman of the Topical Group in Statistical and Nonlinear Physics. In 1995, he was awarded the APS Otto Laporte Memorial Award. In 1997, Sreenivasan became an American citizen.

In 2002, he joined the University of Maryland, College Park and became director of the Institute for Physical Sciences and Technology, which is a part of the University of Maryland College of Computer, Mathematical, and Natural Sciences. That same year, Sreenivasan was named director of the Abdus Salam International Centre for Theoretical Physics (ICTP) in Trieste, Italy where he held the Abdus Salam Honorary Professorship. He started the position in March 2003. While working at ICTP, he continued to hold his appointment at the University of Maryland as Glenn L. Martin Professor of Engineering and professor of physics.

In 2002, he received the Medal in Engineering Sciences from the Academy of Sciences for the Developing World. In 2008, the American Physical Society awarded him the Dwight Nicholson Medal for human outreach. In 2009, he was awarded the American Association for the Advancement of Science International Scientific Cooperation Award. He received the 2011 Multicultural Leadership Award of the National Diversity Council. He also received the UNESCO Medal for promoting international scientific cooperation and world peace from the World Heritage Centre in Italy.

From 2009 until 2011, Sreenivasan served as senior vice provost for New York University's Global Network University in science and technology. In 2007, Sreenivasan joined the National Academy of Sciences. He also served on the Physical Sciences jury for the Infosys Prize in 2009. In November 2012, he was appointed acting president of the Polytechnic Institute of New York University. He became president and dean of the Polytechnic Institute of New York University and dean of engineering at New York University (NYU), and oversaw the Institute's merger with NYU to become the New York University Polytechnic School of Engineering. He is also the executive vice provost in charge of science and technology at NYU. Sreenivasan is the Eugene Kleiner Professor for Innovation in Mechanical Engineering at New York University Polytechnic School of Engineering, and a professor of physics and mathematics professor at the New York University Graduate School of Arts and Science and Courant Institute of Mathematical Sciences.

Sreenivasan has been a visiting professor at the California Institute of Technology, Rockefeller Institute, the Institute for Advanced Study in Princeton, New Jersey, the Isaac Newton Institute for Mathematical Sciences at the University of Cambridge, and the Texas A&M University Institute of Advanced Study. Sreenivasan is a member of the National Academy of Engineering, and a fellow of the American Academy of Arts and Sciences. He is a member of the Indian Academy of Sciences, the Indian National Science Academy, the Academy of Sciences for the Developing World, the African Academy of Sciences, and the Accademia dei Lincei in Italy. He was awarded the American Physical Society's Leo P. Kadanoff Prize for 2022. In 2023 Sreenivasan was awarded a Humboldt Research Award.

== Other activities ==
He has served on scientific journal editorial boards including American Scientist, Physics of Fluids, Journal of Fluid Mechanics, Physical Review E, Physical Review Letters, Journal of Theoretical and Computational Fluid Dynamics, and the Springer book series on Applied Mathematics. Sreenivasan was the editor-in-chief of the Journal of Nonlinear Science.

== Selected publications ==
- Barenghi, C.F.; Skrbek, L.; Sreenivasan, K.R. (2014). "Introduction to quantum turbulence". Proceedings of the National Academy of Sciences. 111 (Supplement 1): 4647–4652. arXiv:1404.1909. Bibcode:2014PNAS..111S4647B. doi:10.1073/pnas.1400033111. PMC 3970860. PMID 24704870.
- Hanasoge, S.M.; Sreenivasan, K.R. (2013). "The quest to understand supergranulation and large-scale convection in the Sun". Solar Physics. 289 (9): 3403–3419. arXiv:1401.0110. Bibcode:2014SoPh..289.3403H. doi:10.1007/s11207-014-0471-4. S2CID 118367973.
- Sreenivasan, K.R.; Antonia, R.A. (1997). "The phenomenology of small-scale turbulence". Annual Review of Fluid Mechanics. 29 (1): 435–472. Bibcode:1997AnRFM..29..435S. doi:10.1146/annurev.fluid.29.1.435.
- Sreenivasan, K.R. (2005). "On the universality of the Kolmogorov constant". Physics of Fluids. 7 (11): 2778–2784. Bibcode:1995PhFl....7.2778S. doi:10.1063/1.868656.
- Meneveau, C.; Sreenivasan, K.R. (1987). "Simple multifractal cascade model for fully developed turbulence". Physical Review Letters. 59 (13): 1424–1427. Bibcode:1987PhRvL..59.1424M. doi:10.1103/physrevlett.59.1424. PMID 10035231.

== See also ==
- Indians in the New York City metropolitan area
