= List of NYU Tandon School of Engineering people =

The following is a partial list of notable NYU Tandon School of Engineering alumni, and current and former faculty. Also see List of New York University alumni.

== Notable faculty ==
- Stephen Arnold
- Boris Aronov – Sloan Research Fellow
- Dan Bailey – fly-shop owner, innovative fly developer and staunch Western conservationist
- Barouh Berkovits – invented the cardiac defibrillator and artificial cardiac pacemaker
- Maureen Braziel
- George Bugliarello – chairman of the Board of Science and Technology for International Development of the National Academy of Sciences; of the National Medal of Technology Nomination Evaluation Committee; and of the National Academy of Engineering Council's International Affairs Committee
- Charles Camarda
- Justin Cappos – professor in the department of Computer Science and Engineering; data-security software developer
- Ju-Chin Chu – chemical engineer and father of Steven Chu; became an Academia Sinica member in 1964
- David and Gregory Chudnovsky – mathematicians who held the record for number of digits of pi in 1989; now run the Institute for Mathematics and Advanced Supercomputing at Polytechnic
- Francis Crick – co-discoverer of DNA structure; awarded Nobel Prize for Physiology or Medicine
- Paul M. Doty – emeritus Harvard Mallinckrodt Professor of Biochemistry; specialized in the physical properties of macromolecules; involved in peace and security policy issues
- R. Luke DuBois – composer, performer, conceptual new media artist, programmer, record producer, pedagogue
- Paul Peter Ewald – inventor of X-ray diffraction method for determination of molecular structure; Physics Department chair until 1957
- Leopold B. Felsen
- Antonio Ferri – leader of a team that created the first practical hypersonic tunnel heater, used to heat air for discharge into a wind tunnel
- R. M. Foster – Bell Labs mathematician whose work was of significance regarding electronic filters for use on telephone lines
- Herbert Freeman
- Siddharth Garg – cybersecurity researcher, associate professor
- Eugene D. Genovese – historian of the American South and slavery
- Gordon Gould – former Polytechnic professor; inventor of the laser
- Leslie Greengard
- S. L. Greitzer – mathematician; founding chairman of the US Mathematical Olympiad; publisher of the pre-college mathematics journal Arbelos
- Charles William Hanko – historian and politician
- David Harker – physicist; X-ray crystallographer; discoverer of the Donnay-Harker law and Harker-Kasper inequalities
- Paul Horn
- Jerry MacArthur Hultin
- Katherine Isbister
- Myles Jackson
- Andrew Kalotay
- Maurice Karnaugh – inventor of Karnaugh Maps (K-Maps) while at Bell Labs; professor at the Westchester campus 1980–1999; retired
- Edward Kimbark – power engineer
- Parke Kolbe
- Joseph Wood Krutch – writer, critic, and naturalist
- Erich E. Kunhardt
- Yann LeCun
- David Lefer
- Paul Levinson – author of The Plot To Save Socrates; media commentator on The O'Reilly Factor; visiting professor at the Philosophy and Technology Study Center at Polytechnic, 1987–1988
- Frederick B. Llewellyn – electrical engineer
- Erwin Lutwak – mathematician
- Rudolph Marcus – former Polytechnic professor; Nobel Prize in chemistry; National Medal of Science winner
- Nathan Marcuvitz – electrical engineering pioneer
- Herman F. Mark – founder of the Polymer Research Institute; National Medal of Science winner
- Warren L. McCabe – chemical engineer and is considered as one of the founding fathers of the profession of chemical engineering
- David Miller
- Elliott Waters Montroll – scientist and mathematician
- Samuel Morse – co-inventor of the Morse code; contributor to the invention of a single-wire telegraph system based on European telegraphs
- J. H. Mulligan, Jr. – namesake of IEEE James H. Mulligan, Jr. Education Medal
- Tsuneo Nakahara
- Beth Simone Noveck
- Donald Othmer – co-author of Kirk-Othmer Encyclopedia of Chemical Technology; inventor of the Othmer Still, a laboratory device for vapor-liquid equilibrium measurements
- Charles G. Overberger
- Athanasios Papoulis – pioneer in the field of stochastic processes
- Leonard Peikoff – former philosophy professor; founder of the Ayn Rand Institute
- David J. Pine
- John R. Ragazzini
- Theodore Rappaport
- John Howard Raymond
- Hans Reissner – German aeronautical engineer
- Keith W. Ross – computer science professor
- Murray Rothbard – former economics professor; key figure in libertarian movement
- Michael Shelley – Professor of Mechanical Engineering
- Joshua W. Sill – professor of Mathematics; became the youngest General in the Civil War; namesake of Fort Sill
- Aleksandra Smiljanić
- Joel B. Snyder – IEEE president
- K. R. Sreenivasan
- Torsten Suel – pioneer of search engine algorithms
- Jerome Swartz – developed early optical strategies for barcode scanning technologies
- Nassim Nicholas Taleb – epistemologist author of The Black Swan; works in the risk engineering department
- James Tenney – composer; music theorist
- John G. Truxal
- Robert Ubell
- Ernst Weber – founder of the Microwave Research Institute; first IEEE president; National Medal of Science winner
- Jack Keil Wolf – researcher in information theory and coding theory; Guggenheim fellow
- Ta-You Wu – nuclear physicist; president of Academia Sinica
- Dante C. Youla – namesake of Youla–Kucera parametrization in control theory
- Louis Zukofsky – modernist poet

== Notable alumni ==
Name	Class year	Notability	References
James Truslow Adams	1898	Writer, historian	
Benjamin Adler		Helped develop commercial television	
Ali Akansu	1983, 1987	Turkish American scientist; known for his contributions to the theory and applications of sub-band and wavelet transforms; professor at NJIT	
Fred Amoroso		Former chairman of Yahoo!; former president, CEO, and director of Rovi Corporation	
Charles E. Anderson	1948	First African-American to receive a Ph.D. in Meteorology	
Bishnu S. Atal	1968	Researcher in linear predictive coding; joined Bell Laboratories in 1961; made major contributions in the field of speech analysis, synthesis, and coding, including low bit-rate speech coding and automatic speech recognition; retired in 2002 to become affiliate professor of Electrical Engineering at the University of Washington	
Franklin Bartlett	1865	U.S. representative from New York	
Jacob Bekenstein	1966, 1969, 1971	Namesake of Bekenstein bound in general relativity; member of Israel Academy of Sciences and Humanities; laureate of the Wolf Prize in Physics for work on black holes	
David Bergstein	1982	Entrepreneur; film producer; chairman of THINKFilm and Capitol Films	
Barouh Berkovits	1956	Invented the cardiac defibrillator and artificial cardiac pacemaker	
Denis Blackmore	1965, 1969	Physicist; contributed to the foundation of black hole thermodynamics; professor at New Jersey Institute of Technology	
Bruno A. Boley		Dean of Engineering at Northwestern University	
Israel Borovich	1967, 1968, 1971, Hon 2005	Chairman, El Al Israel Airlines	
Ursula Burns	1980	CEO, Xerox Corporation	
Charles Camarda	1974	NASA scientist and mission specialist on the Return to Flight voyage of the shuttle Discovery	
Hugh John Casey		Chairman of the New York City Transit Authority; chief engineer of the Army	
K. Mani Chandy	1968	Simon Ramo Professor of Computer Science and deputy chair of engineering at the California Institute of Technology	
Bern Dibner	1921	Inventor of the first solderless electrical connector; founder of the Burndy Corporation	
John Dionisio		Chairman and CEO of AECOM	
Dot da Genius	2008	Hip-hop producer	
Gertrude B. Elion		Former doctoral student at Polytechnic; awarded 1988 Nobel Prize in medicine	
Joel S. Engel	1964	Engineer, known for fundamental contributions to the development of cellular networks	
Leopold B. Felsen	1959, 1961, 1964	Electrical engineer; member of the National Academy of Engineering; named a life fellow of the Institute of Electrical and Electronics Engineers; dean of Engineering 1974–1978 at Polytechnic Institute of Brooklyn; professor at Boston University College of Engineering	
Antonio Ferri		Leader of a team that created the first practical hypersonic tunnel heater, used to heat air for discharge into a wind tunnel	
Paul Ferri		Founder of Matrix Partners	
Charles Ranlett Flint	1868	Businessman; founder of the Computing-Tabulating-Recording Company, which later became IBM	
Elmer L. Gaden		Russ Prize winner	
Torunn Atteraas Garin		Oversaw the development of the artificial sweetener aspartame and was a national spokesperson for it; developed nontoxic processes to create food colorings and remove caffeine from coffee	
Carl Gatto	1960	Republican member of the Alaska House of Representatives	
Norman Gaylord	1949, 1950	Industrial chemist and research scientist; played a key role in the development of the oxygen-permeable contact lens	
Erol Gelenbe	1968, 1972	Electrical engineer; Electrical and Computer Engineering professor at University of Michigan; Electrical and Computer Engineering professor at Duke University; Electrical and Computer Engineering professor at Imperial College London	
Bancroft Gherardi, Jr.	1891, 1933H	Electrical engineer; pioneer in early telephone systems	
Tetsugen Bernard Glassman	1960	Jewish-American Zen Buddhist roshi	
Steven L. Goldman	1962	Andrew W. Mellon Distinguished Professor in the Humanities at Lehigh University	
Martha Greenblatt	1967	Chemist, researcher, and faculty member at Rutgers University	
Jay Greene	1964	Former chief engineer of NASA Johnson Space Center	
Leonard Greene		Inducted into the National Inventors Hall of Fame; inventor and aerodynamics engineer who held more than 200 patents, many aviation-related	
Clayton Hamilton	1900	Drama critic; professor at Columbia University	
Fredric J. Harris	1961	Expert on DSP and communication systems	
Charles Waldo Haskins		Founder of Haskins and Sells, which later merged with Deloitte	
F. Augustus Heinze		Colorful Montana entrepreneur	
Nicholas Hoff		Structural analyst whose calculations became the international guideposts in aircraft design	
Edward Everett Horton	1908	Character actor, appeared in The Front Page, Top Hat, Here Comes Mr. Jordan, Pocketful of Miracles	
Frances Hugle		Scientist, engineer, inventor; contributed to the understanding of semiconductors, integrated circuitry, and the unique electrical principles of microscopic materials	
Joseph J. Jacobs	1937, 1939, 1942	Founder of Jacobs Engineering Group	
Tudor Jenks	1874	Author, poet, artist, editor, journalist, lawyer	
Leopold Just		Designed virtually every major bridge and tunnel in New York City, as well as Washington’s Metro system and the Ohio and Connecticut Turnpikes	
Ephraim Katzir	Post-doc	President of Israel; biophysicist	
Thomas Kelly	1958	Scientist, father of lunar module	
Murray S. Klamkin	1947	Mathematician	
Eugene Kleiner	1948	Honored by the U.S. Postal Service with a commemorative stamp for developing and manufacturing revolutionary computer chips	
William B. Kouwenhoven	1906	Inventor of closed-chest cardiac defibrillator; recipient of Edison Medal; professor and dean of engineering at Johns Hopkins University	
Erich E. Kunhardt	1976	Professor at Stevens Institute of Technology, University of Texas, and NYU-Poly	
Norman Lamm		Chancellor and president of Yeshiva University	
Eugene Lang	1940-41	Millionaire; industrialist; chair emeritus of Swarthmore College; founder and chair emeritus of the Conference of Board Chairs of Liberal Arts Colleges; board member of the Columbia University Business School; board member of New School University	
Yehuda (Leo) Levi	1964	Rector of Jerusalem College of Technology	
Robert H. Lieberman	1962	Novelist and film director; long-time member of the Physics faculty at Cornell University	
Hung-Chang Lin	1956	Inventor	
O. Winston Link	1937	Pioneering photographer	
Charles Battell Loomis		Author	
William H. Maddren		Physician; fourth head coach of the Johns Hopkins University lacrosse team, 1897–1901	
Nathan Marcuvitz		Head of the experimental group of the Radiation Laboratory (MIT)	
Christos V. Massalas	1976	Greek academic working in the fields of mathematics and materials science	
George W. Melville	1861	Civil War-era engineer for the Navy; awarded Congressional Gold Medal; namesake of several ships	
Ami Miron		American Israeli entrepreneur and technology developer; developed and patented the first picture-in-picture for Philips Electronics; led the development of the first high-definition television (HDTV) system in the U.S., for which he received two Technology and Engineering Emmy Awards; founded software networking company MoreCom; president and founder of AM Partners	
Stephen Morse	1963	Architect of the Intel 8086 chip	
Paolo A. Nespoli	1988, 1989	Italian astronaut, mission specialist of STS-120 Space Shuttle mission	
A. Michael Noll	1971	Professor emeritus and dean at the Annenberg School for Communication at University of Southern California	
Joseph Owades	1944, 1950	Brewing pioneer, inventor of lite beer	
Frank Padavan	1956	Republican New York state senator	
Judea Pearl	1965, Ph.D	Professor of Computer Science and Statistics and director of the Cognitive Systems Laboratory at UCLA; awarded Turing Prize in 2011	
Martin L. Perl	1948, Hon 1996	Awarded 1982 Wolf Prize in physics and 1995 Nobel Prize in physics; member of National Academy of Sciences	
Peter Pershan	1956	Physicist; Frank B. Baird, Jr. Professor of Science, in both the Physics Department and Division of Engineering and Applied Sciences at Harvard University; recipient of 1988 Rothschild Prize, 2005 Israel Prize, and 2012 Wolf Prize in Physics	
Leonard M. Pomata		Virginia's secretary of technology	
Martin Pope	1950	Physical chemist and professor emeritus at New York University	
George Preti		Analytical organic chemist, Monell Chemical Senses Center	
Stav Prodromou	1967, 1970	Executive advisor, Alien Technology	
Buddy Ratner	1972	A founding father of modern bioengineering; fellow of the American Association For the Advancement of Science	
Fazlollah Reza	1950	Professor at Massachusetts Institute of Technology	
Mark Ronald	1968	Former president and CEO, BAE Systems Inc.	
Jack Ruina	1957, 1961	Professor emeritus of Electrical Engineering at MIT; instrumental in establishing the MIT Security Studies Program and its first director; professor at Brown University and the University of Illinois	
Richard Santulli	1966	CEO, NetJets	
Martin Schechter		Order of British Columbia recipient for HIV research	
George Segal		Sculptor of monochromatic, cast plaster figures	
Hugh Seidman	1961	Taught writing at the University of Wisconsin, Yale University, Columbia University, the College of William and Mary, and The New School	
Seymour Shapiro	1956 PhD	Synthesized phenformin	
Len Shustek		Chairman of the board of trustees of the Computer History Museum	
Ronald Silverman	1979, 1990	Professor of ophthalmology at Weill Cornell Medical College	
Joel B. Snyder		IEEE president	
Robert J. Stevens	1985	Chairman, president and CEO of Lockheed Martin	
Jerome Swartz	1968	Co-founded Symbol Technologies; professor at Stony Brook University in the departments of Electrical & Computer Engineering and Applied Math & Statistics; professor at NYU-Poly; board member at Stony Brook University and NYU-Poly; trustee at Cold Spring Harbor Laboratory and at the University of California at San Diego	
Mario Tchou		Led a group of scientists from the University of Pisa to invent, in 1959, the ELEA 9003, Italy's first computer	
David J. Thomson	1967, 1971	Electrical engineer; professor at Princeton University, Stanford University, MIT, University of Cambridge, and Queen’s University; fellow of the Royal Society of Canada	
Don Torrieri	1966	Research engineer; fellow of the US Army Research Laboratory	
William Tubby	1875		
Hermann Viets	1965, 1966, 1970	President of Milwaukee School of Engineering; professor of Engineering at Wright State University; professor and associate dean for research at West Virginia University; dean of Engineering at University of Rhode Island	
Pat Villani	1976, 1982	Computer programmer	
Steve Wallach	1966	Adviser to Centerpoint Venture partners, Sevin-Rosen, and Interwest; consultant to the United States Department of Energy Advanced Scientific Computing program at Los Alamos	
Sang Whang	1956, 1966	Korean-American community leader and politician in Florida	
Alexis Williams	attended 2019–23	Activist and engineer	
Robert Anton Wilson	attended 1952–57	Author of 35 influential books	
George A. Wingate	graduated 1890	Surrogate judge of Kings County, New York; National Guard major general	
Ronald R. Yager	1958	Professor at Pennsylvania State University; visiting researcher and scholar at University of California, Berkeley	

== See also ==
- List of New York University alumni
- List of New York University faculty
- List of university and college mergers in the United States
