= Up (airline) =

Israeli airline

UP by El Al
IATA	ICAO	Call sign
LY	ELY	EL AL
- Founded: November 2013
- Ceased operations: 14 October 2018
- Operating bases: Ben Gurion Airport
- Fleet size: 4
- Destinations: 6
- Key people: Israel "Izzy" Borovich
- Website: flyup.com

Up (styled as UP by EL AL) was a low-cost airline brand of Israeli carrier El Al. El Al announced in January 2018 that Up would cease operations in October 2018 to be remerged into El Al.

== History ==
On 26 November 2013, El Al unveiled its new low-cost airline Up, which commenced operations on 30 March 2014, initially to Berlin, Budapest, Kyiv, Larnaca and Prague using Boeing 737-800 aircraft transferred from the El Al mainline fleet. Up was founded by its parent El Al to be used on some routes to Europe where it replaced El Al itself. All flights of Up were operated by El Al, using El Al's call sign and codes with a four digit number. For flights over two hours, the airline offered a buy on board service.

In August 2014, Ryanair CEO Michael O'Leary wanted to develop a "Ryanair Israel", connecting Israel with cities across Europe. He said an inhibiting factor in the plan was Israeli authorities' protectiveness of El Al from competition.

In January 2018, it was announced that El Al were to discontinue the Up brand. Up was planned to cease operations by October 2018, and all flights and aircraft would return to El Al. El Al therefore introduced a new fare structure to replace the Up offers. The last flights operated on 14 October 2018.

As of 2025, El Al is operating its second low-cost subsidiary, Sundor, to a variety of destinations.

== Destinations ==
Up served the following destinations until 14 October 2018:

Country	City	Airport	Notes	Refs
Cyprus	Larnaca	Larnaca International Airport	Terminated	
Czech Republic	Prague	Václav Havel Airport Prague	Terminated	
Germany	Berlin	Berlin Schönefeld Airport	Terminated	
Hungary	Budapest	Budapest Ferenc Liszt International Airport	Terminated	
Israel	Tel Aviv	Ben Gurion International Airport	Base	
Ukraine	Kyiv	Boryspil International Airport	Terminated	

== Fleet ==
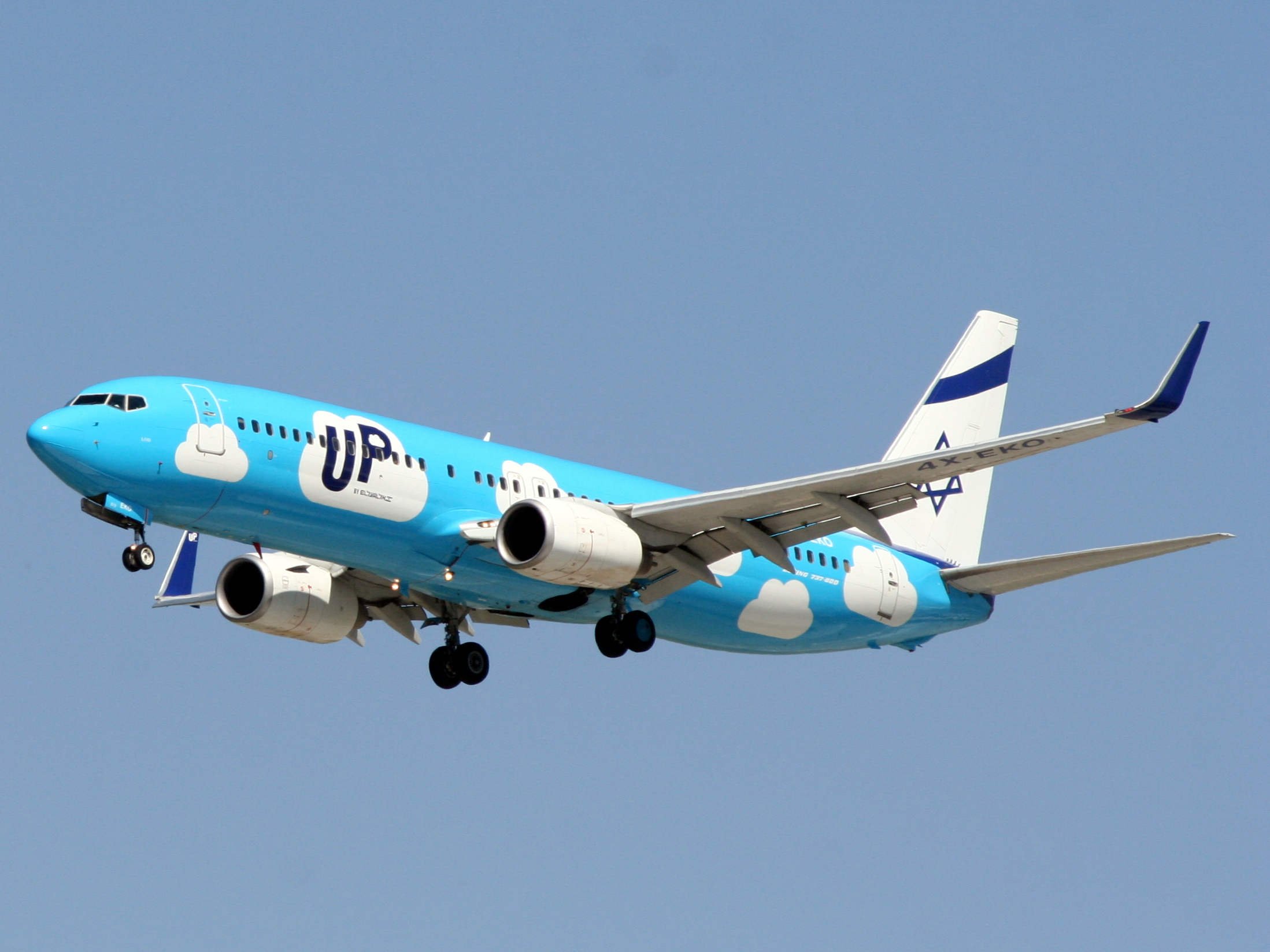
Up Boeing 737-800

Aircraft	In service	Orders	Passengers			Notes
Aircraft	In service	Orders	W	Y	Total	Notes
Boeing 737-800	4	—	36	144	180	Operated by and returned to El Al.
Total	4	—				
