= Christos V. Massalas =

Christos V. Massalas is a Greek academic working in the field of mathematics and materials science. He is widely published and has held senior positions at the University of Ioannina and the University of Western Macedonia.

== Biography ==
Massalas was born in Ioannina, Greece. After graduating as a civil engineer, Massalas continued his education with a diploma degree in mathematics (MSc, PhD, habilitation in mechanics). During his education he obtained scholarships from the Polytechnic Institute of Brooklyn, the Fulbright Foundation and UNESCO. He worked as a professor in the Department of Mathematics until 2000 when he was appointed professor of mechanics of materials at the Department of Materials Science in the University of Ioannina. Massalas has worked as a visiting professor at Trinity College, Dublin (1989–1990). He is a vice-director of the Institute B.R.I. and is a member of the scientific committee of Onassis Foundation Science Lectures. He is the author of several books, monographs and more than 100 research papers. His administrative course started in 1992 as chairman of the Department of Mathematics and was followed as vice-rector (1994–1997) at the University of Ioannina, rector (1997–2003) and the following three years (2003–2006) vice-rector of the university as well as the president of the University of Western Macedonia, Greece (2003-). In addition, he is the chairman of the Board of Higher Education (SAPE).
