= Torsten Suel =

- Born: April 7, 1966 (age 60)
- Education: Braunschweig University of Technology, Germany; University of Texas at Austin
- Awards: Best paper award of 14th ACM World Wide Web Conference (2005)
- Scientific career
- Fields: Computer Scientist
- Workplaces: New York University Tandon School of Engineering
- Doctoral advisor: Charles Gregory Plaxton

Torsten Suel is a professor in the Department of Computer Science and Engineering at the New York University Tandon School of Engineering. He received his Ph.D. in 1994 from the University of Texas at Austin under the supervision of Greg Plaxton. He works on the subjects of implementation of bulk synchronous parallel computation, streaming algorithms for histograms, join operations in databases, distributed algorithms for dominating sets, and web crawler algorithms. A conference paper he co-authored in 2011 introduces fast retrieval techniques that were integrated into the Apache Lucene search engine library.

== Selected bibliography ==
According to Google Scholar's citation list, Suel has 34 journal articles or conference proceedings cited 34 or more times. His five highest cited peer-reviewed papers and IEEE conference proceedings are:

- Jonathan Hill, Bill McColl, Dan C Stefanescu, Mark W Goudreau, Kevin Lang, Satish B Rao, Torsten Suel, Thanasis Tsantilas, Rob H Bisseling, "BSPlib: The BSP programming library" Parallel Computing 24(13), pp. 1947–1980. (1999) Cited 352 times according to Google Scholar; Cited 99 times in Scopus,
- HV Jagadish, Nick Koudas, S Muthukrishnan, Viswanath Poosala, Ken Sevcik, Torsten Suel "Optimal histograms with quality guarantees" Proceedings of the International Conference on Very Large Data Bases (2002) pp. 275–286, IEEE, cited 325 times, according to Google Scholar
- Vladislav Shkapenyuk, Torsten Suel "Design and implementation of a high-performance distributed web crawler" pp. 357–368 Data Engineering 2002: Proceedings. 18th International Conference on Data Engineering, IEEE,(2002) Cited 240 times, according to Google Scholar
- Lujun Jia, Rajmohan Rajaraman, Torsten Suel, "An efficient distributed algorithm for constructing small dominating sets" Distributed Computing 15(3) pp. 193–205 (2002) Cited 188 times, according to Google Scholar.
- Lars Arge, Octavian Procopiuc, Sridhar Ramaswamy, Torsten Suel, Jeffrey Scott Vitter, "Scalable sweeping-based spatial join" Proceedings of the International Conference on Very Large Data Bases pp. 570–581 IEEE, 1998. Cited 173 times, according to Google Scholar.
