= Jay Greene =

American engineer (1942-2017)

Jay H. Greene
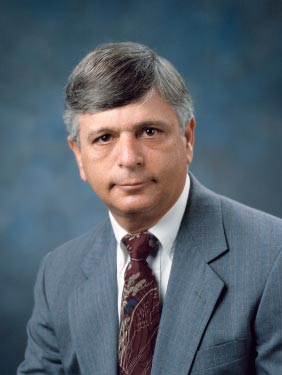
- Jay Greene as Chief Engineer of Johnson Space Center
- Born: May 17, 1942; Brooklyn, New York, U.S.
- Died: October 8, 2017 (aged 75); Houston, Texas, U.S.
- Education: Brooklyn Polytechnic, B.S. 1964
- Known for: Challenger disaster Space Shuttle program
- Awards: NASA Distinguished Service Medal; Rotary Stellar Award; Silver Snoopy award
- Scientific career
- Fields: Electrical Engineering
- Workplaces: National Aeronautics and Space Administration (NASA); Exploration Systems Architecture Study; International Space Station; Johnson Space Center; North American Aviation

Jay Henry Greene (May 17, 1942 – October 8, 2017) was an American engineer who worked in various roles at NASA. Between 2000 and 2004, he served as Chief Engineer at Johnson Space Center, where his role consisted primarily of advising the Center Director. He worked as a FIDO flight controller during the Apollo Program and a flight director from 1982 to 1986, and as ascent flight director during the 1986 Space Shuttle Challenger disaster.

Greene worked for four years as a manager on the International Space Station project and received several awards for his work including the NASA Distinguished Service Medal. After his retirement in 2004 he served as a part-time consultant on the Exploration Systems Architecture Study. NASA Associate Administrator Rex Geveden described him as "a famous technical curmudgeon in the Agency".

== Early life ==
Greene grew up in Brooklyn and graduated from Brooklyn Polytechnic in 1964 with a Bachelor of Science degree in electrical engineering. His first job was at North American Aviation in Downey, California, but he did not find the work particularly satisfying. Less than a year later, he accepted a job with NASA at the Manned Spacecraft Center (later named the Johnson Space Center) in Houston, Texas. Greene was Jewish.

== Apollo program ==
Despite the fact that his degree was in electrical engineering, Greene was assigned to the flight dynamics branch and trained to be a Flight Dynamics Officer (FIDO) for the upcoming Apollo program. His responsibilities in Mission Control would include monitoring the trajectory of the Apollo spacecraft, computing changes in orbit, and plotting course corrections and adjustments.

His first shift as a flight controller was during the launch of the unmanned Apollo 6. The launch turned out to be a memorable one, as two engines cut out on the second stage of the Saturn V booster less than five minutes after lift-off. Although the mission was not aborted, it was a challenging launch for the Flight Dynamics officer—the spacecraft diverged from its intended trajectory so severely that Greene was nearly forced to call an abort.

In 1969, Greene was chosen to work the descent shift for Apollo 11, the first lunar landing. This was a coveted and prestigious assignment, showing the esteem in which he was held by his superiors. Flight Director Gene Kranz, who also worked the descent shift, described Greene as "elite in the ranks of the FIDOs, cocky and crisp with his calls."

During the Apollo 13 crisis, Greene played a lesser role. Unlike many other flight controllers, most notably Gene Kranz, he was not positive about the astronauts' chance of survival. "A lot of them in retrospect will tell you how macho and cool [it was]," he said in an interview some years later, "but it was pretty grim." Greene later stated that "when they opened up that capsule, I was sure all they would find would be three dead bodies. I honestly didn't see how we could get them home."

Greene was a FIDO on Apollo 6 through 17, excluding Apollo 9.

== Space Shuttle program ==
After the Apollo program concluded, Greene spent two years as a Range Safety Coordinator, planning the procedures that would be followed if something went wrong with the trajectory of the Space Shuttle during launch. He fought to keep the Shuttle from being fitted with a range safety destruct system, which would allow it to be destroyed remotely from the ground. However, he was not successful and believed that he was removed from the position as a result of his stand on the issue.

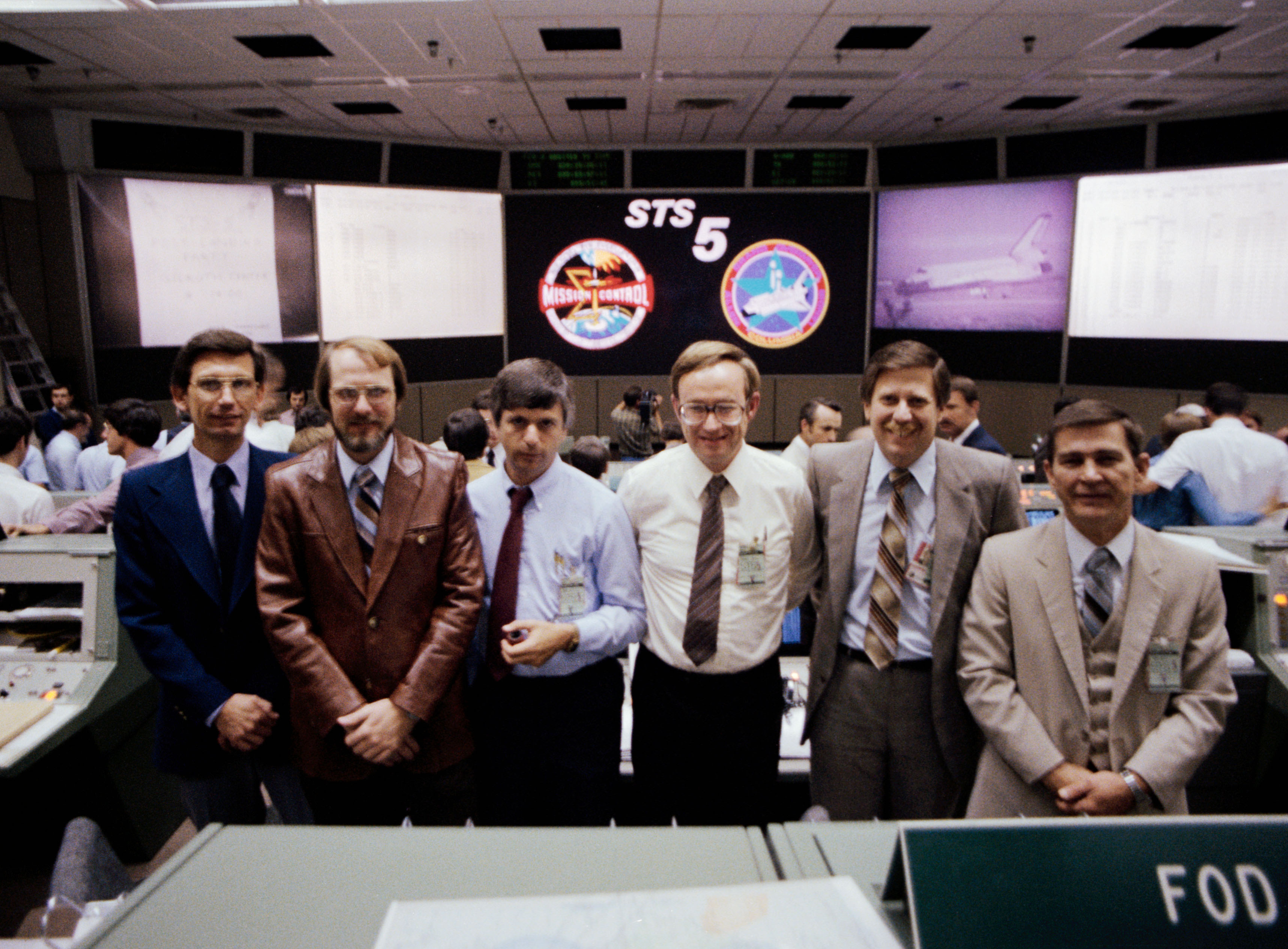
Jay Greene (third from left) and Tommy Holloway (fourth from left) with a group of flight directors after the successful completion of the STS-5 mission.

Greene remained in the flight dynamics branch until 1982, spending 1976 through 1979 as section head and 1980 through 1982 as branch chief. He was a FIDO on STS-1 and worked his last mission as FIDO in 1981 on STS-2, the second Shuttle launch. By that point, his responsibilities in the flight dynamics branch were largely managerial.

That year, at the request of Johnson Space Center flight operations director George Abbey, he began the process of training to become a flight director. He worked STS-3 and STS-4 as a backup flight director, learning the job by being paired with the experienced flight director Tommy Holloway and observing him at work. Greene's first mission as flight director in his own right was STS-6, which launched on April 6, 1983. As a flight director, Greene specialized in the ascent shift, considered to be one of the most demanding and dangerous phases of a mission. He worked on ten flights between 1983 and 1986, including STS-61-C, which was notable for having included Rep. Bill Nelson (D-FL) as a member of the crew. In his book about the mission, Nelson characterized Greene as a "no-nonsense type of man," "underpaid and overworked," yet dedicated to his job. His tenth and final mission as lead Flight Director was on STS-51-L.

== Challenger disaster ==
Greene was not originally assigned to work the STS-51-L mission, which was scheduled to launch a mere ten days after the landing of STS-61-C. Due to staffing issues, he was pulled from STS-61-C and reassigned as ascent flight director for STS-51-L. As flight director, Greene was involved in discussion (although by his own recollection, "not a lot") about concerns with the cold weather and ice on the morning of the launch. These concerns had been worked primarily during the shift preceding his, and their conclusion had been that the freezing weather was not a reason to call off the launch as far as the orbiter was concerned. While he did have the authority to halt the countdown, he chose to report 'GO' to the KSC Launch Director.

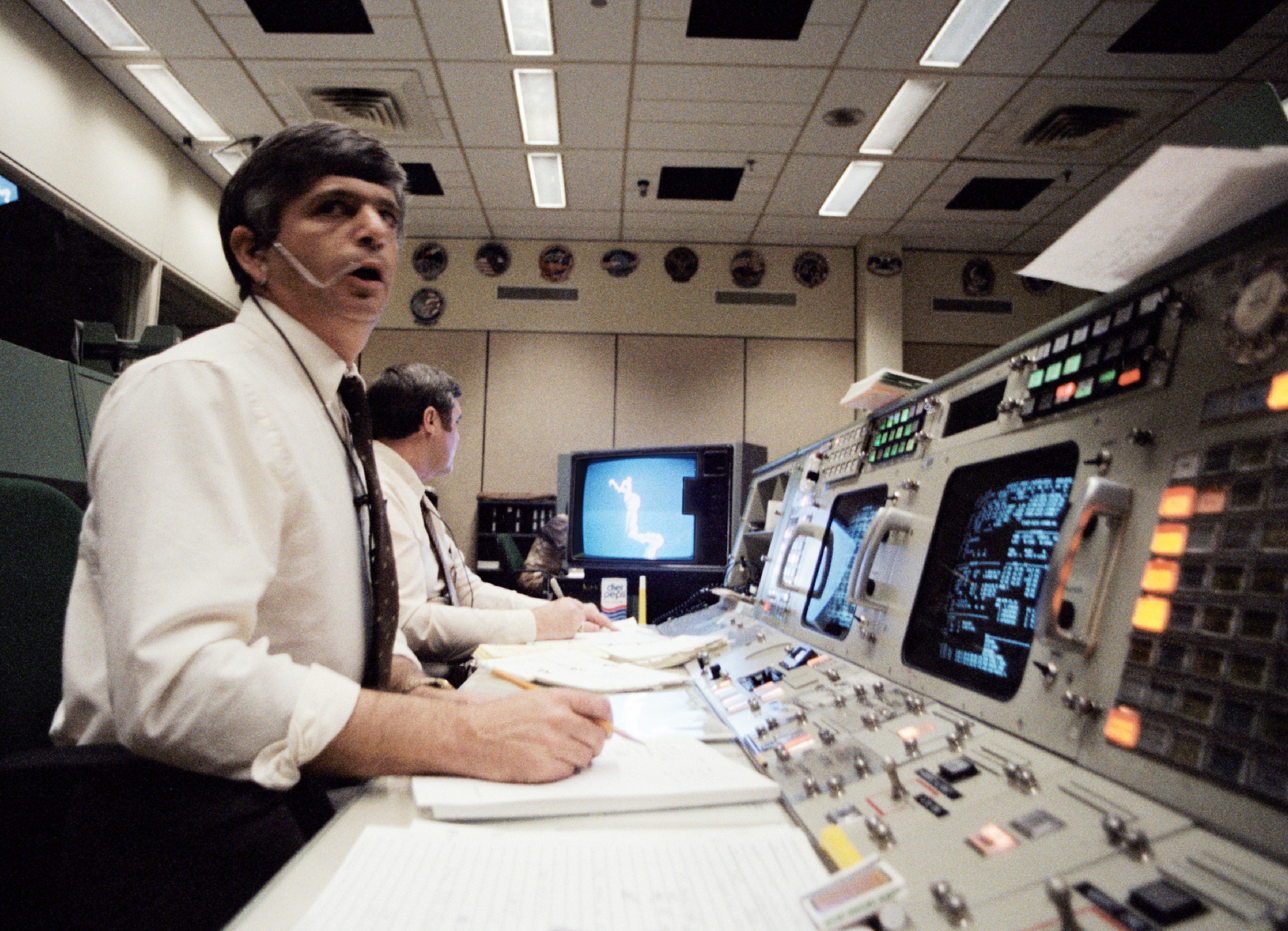
Greene at his console after the loss of Challenger

In the minutes following the loss of Challenger, Greene's responsibilities as flight director centered on ensuring that data from the accident was properly recorded and preserved, and that incident reports were written up.

NASA adopted a policy of minimum engagement with the press in the immediate aftermath of the accident. On the following day, the New York Times noted that "neither Jay Greene, flight director for the ascent, nor any other person in the control room, was made available to the press by the space agency". He did, however, appear at a press conference later that day, where he answered questions about the accident. All the data received at Mission Control up to the time of Challenger's disintegration appeared normal, he reported, and he was not able to shed light on the accident's cause.

== Managerial positions ==
As technical manager for the International Space Station, Jay Greene (third from right) takes part in a ribbon-cutting ceremony for a refurbished altitude chamber at Kennedy Space Center. It was to be used to perform leak tests on ISS modules.

After Challenger, Greene retired as a flight director. In October 1987, after a short period working with a study group on lunar exploration, he was appointed head of NASA's safety division. The division had been created after the Challenger accident at the recommendation of the Rogers Commission, which saw its establishment as key in creating a new, more vigorous "safety culture" at NASA. However, Greene feared that too much introspection by NASA engineers could lead to a damaging loss of confidence. In an interview a year later, he said that NASA had been on "a fantastic guilt trip," adding that "I believe NASA has been overly eager to defend itself against all critics. Any time you have an independent panel, you ought to be able to name a defense attorney for the status quo."

In the following years he worked as Deputy Associate Administrator for Exploration at NASA Headquarters in Washington, DC from 1991 through 1993, and also held other positions throughout. In 1995 he became Manager of the Space Shuttle Engineering Office, a technically challenging job that he enjoyed greatly. "That was an amazingly good feeling," he later said, "owning four Shuttles. Going down to the Cape and visiting them and actually feeling ownership and responsibility for them." However, his opposition to the creation of the United Space Alliance was controversial, and he spent less than two years in the position.

From 1996 to 2000, Greene was Deputy Manager for Technical Development on the International Space Station. He received the NASA Distinguished Service Medal, the Rotary Stellar Award, and a Silver Snoopy award for his work on the station. Finally, between 2000 and 2004, he served as Chief Engineer at Johnson Space Center, where his role consisted primarily of advising the Center Director.

== Retirement ==
After retiring from NASA in 2004, Greene worked as a part-time consultant on the Exploration Systems Architecture Study, which aimed to provide a blueprint for America's return to the Moon and Mars. "We put together a greybeard review team," explained NASA Associate Administrator Rex Geveden, describing Greene as "a famous technical curmudgeon in the Agency." He was also interviewed extensively for two History Channel documentaries about Mission Control, Failure Is Not an Option and Beyond the Moon: Failure Is Not an Option 2.

Greene died at his home in Houston, Texas, on October 8, 2017.
