= Stephen Arnold (scientist) =

American physicist

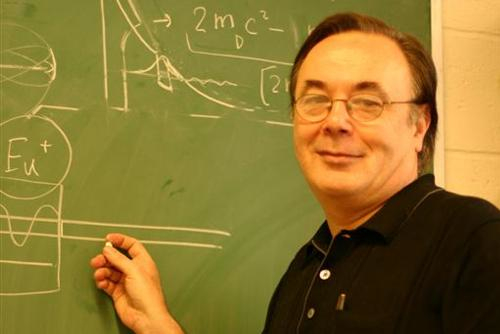
- Born: New York City
- Education: City University of New York, University of Toledo
- Occupations: Professor of Physics and Chemical Engineering
- Organization: NYU Tandon School of Engineering

Stephen Arnold is a professor of Physics and Chemical Engineering and the Thomas Potts Professor of Physics at the NYU Tandon School of Engineering. He is also an Othmer-Potts Senior Faculty fellow. The focus of Arnold's research is developing ultra-sensitive bio-sensors and detection of single bio-nanoparticles from virus down to single protein molecules, using whispering-gallery wave bio-sensors.

== Education ==
Arnold holds a Bachelor of Science in engineering physics in 1964 from the University of Toledo and a Ph.D. in physics from the City University of New York in 1970.

== Career ==
Arnold worked at the Ecole Normale Superieure, Paris, from March 1972 to September 1973. In 1981, he was named a fellow of the Alfred P. Sloan Foundation. He was a Chevron distinguished visiting professor at the California Institute of Technology from February 1985 to May 1985. In 1986, he was awarded the Sigma Xi Award for Distinguished Scientific Research. In 1988, he became a fellow of the Optical Society of America. He worked at the Aerospace Corporation as a technical staff member from February 1990 to May 1990, and became a fellow of the American Physical Society in 1990. In 1994, he received the Outstanding Publication Award at Oak Ridge National Laboratory. Arnold was a visiting scholar at the University of Tokyo from February 1997 to May 1997. In 2000, the University of Toledo awarded him the John J. Turin Award for Outstanding Career Accomplishments in Physics.

Arnold became director of the Othmer Institute for Interdisciplinary Research at NYU Polytechnic in July 2003. In February 2009, he was issued a patent from a filing in March 2002 for "Detecting and/or Measuring Substance based on Resonance Shifts (of Photons Orbiting within a Microsphere)". He was a vising scholar at Harvard University from January until June 2013. Arnold is a University Professor of Physics and Chemical Engineering at the NYU Polytechnic School of Engineering, and is the Thomas Potts Professor of physics.

== Research ==
A simplified model of the resonance shift seen if a particle contacts the surface of the sensor

Arnold's research has focused on label-free detection of bio-nanoparticles from the perturbation of the resonant frequency of a microcavity, after estimating the extreme sensitivity of such an approach for DNA sensing in a 2001 American Scientist article. In 2003, he and his co-workers identified the mechanism for the detection of individual protein and viruses. The recipe for the detection and sizing of single HIV viruses following this mechanism was proposed early in 2008 at a Faraday Discussion of the Royal Society of Chemistry. Later that year, this recipe was applied to the detection and sizing of comparably sized single Influenza virus particles. This research is funded by the National Science Foundation. Researchers led by Arnold demonstrated the detection and sizing of the smallest individual RNA virus. They developed the Whispering Gallery-Mode Biosensor, an ultra-sensitive biosensor based on their original proposal and patent application. An additional discovery by co-researcher S.I. Shopova that gold nano-receptors on the microcavity lead to a further frequency shift enhancement led to another patent issued in 2013, from a filing in 2011. This hybrid sensor uses gold nano-antennas on a small glass sphere to detect single ultra-small virus particles as well as individual proteins. Arnold and his team have detected single thyroglobulin molecules, a human cancer marker protein, and single serum albumin molecules, a bovine plasma protein.

== Selected publications ==
- Stephen Arnold, David Keng, "Real-time Size/Mass Spectrometry in Solution using Whispering Gallery Micro-Global Positioning", Optical Society of America (2015).
- S. Holler, V.R. Dantham, D. Keng, V. Kolchenko, S. Arnold, Brigid Mulroe, M. Paspaley-Grbavac, "The Whispering Gallery Mode Biosensor: Label-free Detection From Virus to Single Protein", International Society for Optics and Photonics (2014).
- Dantham V.R., Holler S., Wan Z., Kolchenko V., Arnold S. (2012). "Taking Whispering Gallery Mode Single Virus Detection and Sizing to the Limit". Appl. Phys. Lett. 101 (4): 043704. Bibcode:2012ApPhL.101d3704D. doi:10.1063/1.4739473.
- Shopova S. I., Rajmangal R., Holler S., Arnold S. (2011). "Plasmonic Enhancement of a Whispering Gallery Mode Biosenor for Single Nanoparticle Detection". Applied Physics Letters. 98 (24) 243104. Bibcode:2011ApPhL..98x3104S. doi:10.1063/1.3599584.
- Shopova S. I., Rajmangal R., Nishida Y., Arnold S. (2010). "Ultra-sensitive Nanoparticle Detection using a Portable Whispering Gallery Mode Biosensor driven by a PPLN doubled DFB laser". Review of Scientific Instruments. 81 (10): 103110. doi:10.1063/1.3499261. PMID 21034078.
- Arnold S., Shopova S.I., Holler S. (2010). "Whispering Gallery Mode Bio-sensor for label-free detection of single molecules: thermo-optic vs. reactive mechanism". Optics Express. 18 (1): 281–287. Bibcode:2010OExpr..18..281A. doi:10.1364/oe.18.000281. PMID 20173848.
- Vollmer F., Arnold S. (2008). "Whispering-gallery-mode biosensing: label-free detection down to single molecules". Nature Methods. 5 (7): 591–596. Bibcode:2008NatCB...5..591V. doi:10.1038/nmeth.1221. PMID 18587317. S2CID 8277240.
- Arnold S., Ramjit R., Keng D., Kolchenko V., Teraoka I. (2008). "MicroParticle PhotoPhysics Illuminates Viral Biosensing". Faraday Discussions. 137: 65–83. Bibcode:2008FaDi..137...65A. doi:10.1039/b702920a. PMID 18214098.
- Arnold Stephen (2001). "Microspheres, Photonic Atoms and the Physics of Nothing". American Scientist. 89 (5): 414–421. doi:10.1511/2001.34.754.
