= Siddharth Garg =

Computer Scientist

- Education: Indian Institute of Technology, Madras, B.Tech (2004); Stanford University, MS (2005); Carnegie Mellon University, PhD (2009)
- Scientific career
- Fields: Computer Science, Cybersecurity
- Workplaces: New York University Tandon School of Engineering
- Thesis: System-level modeling and mitigation of the impact of process variations on digital integrated circuits (2009)
- Doctoral advisor: Diana Marculescu

Siddharth Garg is a cybersecurity researcher and associate professor at New York University Tandon School of Engineering. He is also a member of NYU WIRELESS. Garg is known for his research leveraging machine learning to securely manufacture computer chips so they are less prone to hacking. In 2016, he was named one of Popular Science magazine's "Brilliant 10."

== Education ==
Garg attended Indian Institute of Technology, Madras where he received his Bachelor of Technology degree in 2004. He then attended Stanford University for his Master of Science degree in electrical engineering 2005. For his doctoral research, he attended Carnegie Mellon University, where he received his PhD in 2009. His doctoral advisor was Diana Marculescu and his dissertation, entitled System-level modeling and mitigation of the impact of process variations on digital integrated circuits, received Carnegie Mellon's Angel G. Jordan Award for outstanding thesis contribution.

== Career ==
Following Garg's postdoctoral work, he became an assistant professor at University of Waterloo from 2010 to 2014, before moving to New York University Tandon School of Engineering, where he is currently an associate professor. His research interests bridge machine learning and cybersecurity. His research group has investigated how artificial intelligence can be exploited by malicious actors. They found that it is possible to embed behavior in artificial intelligence algorithms, for example those used for speech recognition, that can emerge in response to certain signals. Garg and his team showed that they could train an image recognition algorithm to interpret a stop sign as a speed limit signal by placing a post-it note over it. When such behavior is programmed by malicious actors, it's known as a "backdoor." They are working to understand different backdoors in order to develop ways to proactively detect them. Garg has also worked to develop manufacturing protocols for computer chips to make them resistant to hacking attempts.

== Awards and honors ==
- Brilliant 10, Popular Science, 2016
- National Science Foundation CAREER Awards, 2015
