= Charles William Hanko =

American historian

- Born: August 3, 1920
- Died: December 7, 1990 (aged 70)
- Occupations: Historian, Politician

Charles William Hanko (August 3, 1920 – December 7, 1990) was an American historian and politician.

Hanko ran unsuccessfully as a Republican Candidate for the Pennsylvania State House of Representatives in 1948. He was for a time a professor of history at the Brooklyn Polytechnic Institute in the Dept. of History and Economics. He held a fellowship related to economics at Case Institute of Technology (now part of Case Western Reserve University) in 1954.

Hanko wrote biographies of John Gibson and Matthew Stanley Quay. Other books by Hanko include Economic threats to America and Christian Mobilizing (Neward: Washington Irving Pub. Co., 1955). He also wrote a book The Evangelical Protestant Movement (Educators Pub.Co.,1955) In 1972 Hanko wrote "Suarez and Western Civilization."

Hanko was a member of the Evangelical Congregational Church in McKeesport, Pennsylvania, where he was a licentiate minister. This congregation became an Evangelical Protestant Church.

== Sources ==
- Dust jacket of The Life of John Gibson: Soldier, Patriot, Statesman
- listing of Gibson's books
