= Sang Whang =

- Education: Polytechnic Institute of Brooklyn

Korean name
- Hangul: 황상연
- RR: Hwang Sangyeon
- MR: Hwang Sangyŏn

Sang Whang (October 16, 1931 – January 24, 2011) was a Korean American church leader and community advocate in Florida.

== Personal life ==
The eldest of four children, Whang emigrated to the United States in December 1951 at the age of 20, arriving at San Francisco, California by ship. After arriving, he enrolled in the Polytechnic Institute of Brooklyn to study electrical engineering; he received his bachelor's degree in 1956, and his master's from the same school in 1966. He met his wife Mary, who was born in Pyongyang, while a student there; she had emigrated to the States along with her father, who worked with the U.S. army in South Korea. His wife died in 1995 after a ten-year period of lung disease.

== Political and religious activities ==
Whang was the founder and first president of the Korean Association of Greater Miami. In 1976, he became an elder at the Korean Presbyterian Church of Miami. In 1998, he received the Essie Silva Community Builder Award from the United Way of America's Miami-Dade branch. In 1999, he became the first Asian American to serve as chairman of the county Community Relations Board, which was established in 1963. He was especially interested in promoting better relations between the Korean American and African American communities, an issue which became of greater concern to him in the aftermath of the 1992 Los Angeles riots.

== Alternative health ==
Apart from his political activities, Whang ran his own business, Alkalife, which promotes alternative health practices such as the use of far infrared radiation to promote growth and health of living cells. He self-published a book entitled Aging and Reverse Aging, about the alleged health benefits of high-alkaline water and other alternative health practices. After his death, his son Peter Whang took over as Alkalife's head of research and development.
