= Joel B. Snyder =

Joel B. Snyder (d. 4 June 2011) served as the 2001 IEEE President. He was also a member of the board of directors of IEEE. Snyder received his Bachelor and Master of Science degrees in electrical engineering from the Polytechnic Institute of Brooklyn. He has also taught at Polytechnic University in Brooklyn, N.Y.; the New York Institute of Technology; and Long Island University.
