= Torunn Atteraas Garin =

Norwegian chemical engineer

Torunn Atteraas Garin (1947/1948 - 2 May 2002) was a Norwegian chemical engineer who worked on notable food projects. She worked on the artificial sweetener aspartame and was a national spokesperson for the product. She also developed nontoxic processes to create food colorings and remove caffeine from coffee. She graduated from the New York University Polytechnic School of Engineering in 1977.
