= John Dionisio =

American businessman

John M. Dionisio
- Born: c. 1948
- Occupation: Executive Chairman of AECOM Technology Corporation (2014 - present)

John M. Dionisio led AECOM (NYSE: ACM), an $8-billion global provider of professional technical and management support services, as chief executive officer from 2005 to 2011. He was chairman from 2011 to 2014, becoming executive chairman in 2014. He earned a master of science degree in civil engineering from New York University Tandon School of Engineering (then Polytechnic Institute of New York).
