= Norman Gaylord =

Norman Grant Gaylord (born Norman Gershon Goldstein; February 16, 1923 – September 18, 2007) was an American industrial chemist and research scientist. He was credited with playing a key role in the development of the gas-permeable rigid contact lens which allows oxygen to reach the wearer's cornea.

A native of Brooklyn, he was a graduate of City College and received his doctorate in polymer chemistry from the Polytechnic Institute of Brooklyn, now NYU Tandon School of Engineering. He legally changed his name in the 1940s. For his contribution to the production of lenses Gaylord received in 1985 Founder's Award from the American Academy of Optometry.

Gaylord died in the Florida city of Boynton Beach at the age of 84.
