= Fredric J. Harris =

Fredric Joel Harris (or, as he prefers to spell his name, fred harris) (born April 6, 1940) is an adjunct professor at University of California San Diego. He was a professor of Electrical engineering and was CUBIC signal processing chair at San Diego State University. He is an internationally renowned expert on DSP and Communication Systems. He is also the co-inventor of the Blackman-Harris window. He also has extensively published many technical papers, the most famous being the seminal 1978 paper "On the use of Windows for Harmonic Analysis with the Discrete Fourier Transform." He is also the author of the textbook Multi-rate Signal Processing for Communication Systems and is co-author with Bernard Sklar of the 3-rd edition textbook on Digital Communications. He holds 38 patents on DSP and digital radio receiver technology.

Harris received his B.S. from Brooklyn Polytechnic Institute, his M.S. from San Diego State University, his PhD from Aalborg University, and did PhD course work at the University of California, San Diego. He is an IEEE Fellow and was co-editor-in-chief of the Elsevier journal Digital Signal Processing.

In early 2010 the "Fred Harris Endowed Chair in Digital Signal Processing" fund was established by Eric Johnson and Qualcomm executive Peggy Johnson. The fund is described to encourage and enable future students to pursue careers in the communications specialty of electrical engineering and to honor Fred Harris' legacy. In 2020, the Johnson's funded the fred harris Chair of DSP with a donation of $3.1 million.
