= Joseph J. Jacobs =

American chemical engineer

- Born: Joseph J. Jacobs; June 13, 1916; Brooklyn, New York
- Died: October 23, 2004 (aged 88); Pasadena, California
- Education: New York University Tandon School of Engineering; Hoover Medal
- Occupations: Businessman; philanthropist; investor
- Title: Founder and Former Chairman Jacobs Engineering Group
- Term: (1946–2004)
- Successor: Steven J. Demetriou

Joseph J. Jacobs (June 13, 1916 - October 23, 2004) was an American chemical engineer who founded Jacobs Engineering Group, a large engineering and construction company. Jacobs was also a recipient of the Hoover Medal.

== Early life ==
Jacobs was born in Brooklyn, New York, in 1916. His father was a Lebanese immigrant who sold straight razors. He attended Brooklyn Technical High School. Jacobs worked various jobs to pay for his bachelor's degree in chemical engineering from the New York University Tandon School of Engineering, and taught college while he earned his master's degree and doctorate in that field, in 1939 and 1942, respectively.

== Career ==
As a young engineer, he worked for Merck & Co. to develop mass production of both DDT and penicillin. In 1943, he was accidentally doused with hundreds of pounds of hot DDT when a hopper valve opened. Although coated with, by his own estimate, an inch of DDT from head to foot; according to the book Eco-Freaks, Jacobs suffered no ill consequences from his exposure.

=== Jacobs Engineering ===
After World War II, he moved to California, intending to go into business himself. In 1947, he opened a one-man consulting engineering business in Pasadena, California, where he and his wife made their home. This grew into Jacobs Engineering Group, a large engineering and construction company.

=== Later years ===
Jacobs stepped down as chief executive of Jacobs Engineering Group in 1992, but remained as chairman of the board. He then founded two venture capital firms and devoted time to charity work. He had previously created the Jacobs Family Foundation, which donated about $32 million to non-profit organizations. In 1998, he set up the Jacobs Center for Neighbourhood Innovation in San Diego, California. He died at the age of 88 on October 23, 2004, in Pasadena.

== Publications ==
Jacobs also authored two books. The first, The Anatomy of an Entrepreneur: Family, Culture and Ethics, was an autobiography published in 1991. The second, Compassionate Conservative: Assuming Responsibility and Respecting Human Dignity, was published in 1995 and outlined his political philosophy.

== Honors ==
- Chairman of the Board of Trustees of Polytechnic University (Polytechnic Institute of Brooklyn)
- Trustee of Harvey Mudd College (Claremont, California)
- In 1983, he received the Hoover Medal, which recognizes the civic and humanitarian achievements of professional engineers.
- In 1994, he was elected to membership in the National Academy of Engineering. His election citation states, "For the application of chemical engineering construction principles and for service to the profession."
- In 2002, he received the Carroll H. Dunn Award of Excellence from the Construction Industry Institute.
- Jacobs Hall on the campus of New York University Tandon School of Engineering is named after Jacobs and his wife, Violet, originally dedicated in 2002.
- In 2003, he was inducted into the Brooklyn Tech Alumni Foundation Hall of Fame
