= Rex Geveden =

American businessman

Rex Geveden, president and chief executive officer of BWX Technologies. Former executive vice president of Teledyne Technologies Inc and former Associate Administrator of NASA

Rex Geveden (born 1962 in Mayfield, Kentucky) is the president and chief executive officer of BWX Technologies. Previously he was chief operating officer.

Before his tenure with BWXT, Geveden was executive vice president of Teledyne Technologies Inc and president of Teledyne Dalsa in Waterloo, Ontario. Previously he was the president of Teledyne Brown Engineering and the associate administrator of NASA before that. He was selected for that position by NASA chief Michael Griffin on August 17, 2005, after haservingn an acting capacity since June of that year. Griffin created the position immediately before assigning Geveden to fill it. The associate administrator's task is described as "oversight for all the agency's technical missions' areas and field center operations". Griffin also suggested Geveden was his right-hand man, saying "...if you get a decision from Rex, it's the agency's decision."

Geveden's first job out of college was at Teledyne Brown Engineering (where he later became president). After a few years at Teledyne Brown, Geveden joined NASA in 1990 and worked on hardware design for several science satellite missions, including as project manager for the Optical Transient Detector satellite, the Lightning Imaging Sensor satellite, and the Gravity Probe B satellite, a successful test of frame dragging effects predicted by General Relativity. He was promoted to deputy director of the science directorate at Marshall Space Flight Center, then in 2003 to deputy director of Marshall Space Flight Center. In November 2004, he was promoted again to become chief engineer of NASA, simultaneously with a major expansion of that office's responsibilities, in the wake of the report of the Columbia Accident Investigation Board. Only seven months later, in the first weeks of Mike Griffin's administration in June 2005, Griffin made Geveden his acting associate administrator until the post was officially created.

Geveden is a native of Mayfield, Kentucky, and a graduate of Lowes High School. He is married to Gail Geveden, and they have two children, Bridget and Jake. He received a bachelor's degree in engineering physics and master's degrees in physics in 1983 and 1984 respectively, both from Murray State University in Kentucky. While at Murray, he was a member of Sigma Pi Sigma honorary society. Geveden also graduated from the Program Management School at the Defense Systems Management College.

Geveden announced his plans to leave NASA at the end of July 2007 to become president of Teledyne Brown Engineering in Huntsville, Alabama. Mike Griffin praised Geveden on his departure saying he "possesses one of the most agile minds I have encountered". Geveden was replaced as Associate Administrator of NASA by Christopher Scolese. In 2014, Teledyne announced the promotion of Geveden to president of Teledyne Dalsa following the retirement of DALSA's CEO, in addition to his role as executive vice president of Teledyne Technologies.
