= Ami Miron =

American Israeli entrepreneur and technology developer

- עמי מירון
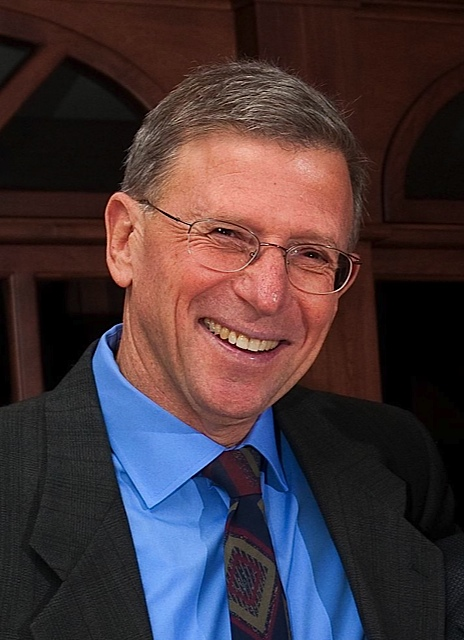
- Born: Ami Miron; Kibbutz Ruhama, Israel
- Education: Technion; Polytechnic Institute of NYU; Columbia University
- Known for: Picture In Picture (PIP); Ghost canceling technology High-definition television (HDTV)

Ami Miron (Hebrew: עמי מירון) is an American Israeli entrepreneur and technology developer specializing in consumer electronics, the Internet, and television. He developed and patented the first commercially successful Picture In Picture (PIP) for Philips Electronics. Miron also worked to solve the problem of ghost images on television and led the development of the first high-definition television (HDTV) system in the U.S. He received two Technology and Engineering Emmy Awards for these last two innovations.

== Early life and education ==
Miron was born and grew up on Kibbutz Ruhama in southern Israel. Following service in the Israel Defense Forces (IDF) during the 1973 Yom Kippur War , he earned a Bachelor of Science (BSc) in electrical engineering from the Technion, Israel Institute of Technology He went on to receive a master's degree in electrical engineering (MSEE) from the Polytechnic Institute of New York University and a professional degree in electrical engineering from Columbia University. He later completed an executive management program at Babson College.

== Career ==
=== Philips Electronics ===
After working for Dutch electronics company Philips in the Netherlands, in 1981 Miron came to the U.S. in 1981 to work for them. Miron developed and patented the first Picture in Picture (PIP) system for Philips. He subsequently developed a system to solve the problem of ghost images on television. The FCC selected this Ghost Canceling System as the U.S. standard, which won Miron a Technology and Engineering Emmy Award. Miron won his second Technology and Engineering Emmy Award for leading the development of the first high-definition television (HDTV) system in the U.S., which the FCC then selected as the U.S. standard.

=== General Instrument Corporation ===
In 1993, Miron joined Horsham, Pennsylvania-based General Instrument Corporation (later part of Motorola and now Google) as vice president to lead advanced technology and new products for the cable television, consumer and telecommunication markets.

=== MoreCom ===
In 1997, Miron left General Instrument to found MoreCom Inc., a software networking company based in Horsham that provided digital entertainment and Internet content to televisions. In 2000, Liberate Technologies acquired the privately held firm in an all-stock deal.

== Current ventures ==
Miron is the founder and president of Philadelphia-based AM Partners, which works with entrepreneurs, start-ups, venture capital, and universities. He serves on the board of Ben Franklin Technology Partners and on the advisory board of Emerald Stage2 Ventures. Miron also serves as a senior advisor at the Wharton Small Business Development Center and an advisor to the Columbia University Entrepreneurship program.

== Personal life ==
Miron resides in Dresher, Pennsylvania and is the father to four children.
