= Barouh Berkovits =

Slovak-born American bioengineer (1926–2012)

Barouh Vojtech Berkovits
- Born: Baruch Vojtěch Berkowitz; May 7, 1926; Lučenec, Czechoslovakia
- Died: October 23, 2012 (aged 86); Newton, Massachusetts, U.S.
- Education: New York University Tandon School of Engineering
- Awards: Distinguished Scientist Award from the Heart Rhythm Society
- Scientific career
- Fields: Biomedical engineering
- Workplaces: New York University Tandon School of Engineering, Medtronic

Barouh Vojtech Berkovits (May 7, 1926 – October 23, 2012) was a Slovak-born American bioengineer. He was one of the pioneers of bio-engineering, particularly the cardiac defibrillator and artificial cardiac pacemaker. In particular, Berkovits invented the "demand pacemaker" and the DC defibrillator.

== Biography ==
Berkovits was born Baruch Vojtěch Berkowitz in Lučenec, Czechoslovakia. His parents and sister were murdered at Auschwitz. He immigrated to the United States in the 1950s, and worked for the pacemaker company Medtronic from 1975 until his retirement. In 1982, Berkovits received the "Distinguished Scientist Award" from the Heart Rhythm Society. He graduated from the New York University Tandon School of Engineering in 1956. He was also a faculty member at NYU Tandon.
