= Edward Kimbark =

Edward Wilson Kimbark (September 21, 1902 - February 7, 1982) was a noted power engineer and professor of Electrical Engineering at Northwestern University.

Kimbark was born in Chicago, Illinois to Edward Hall and Maude (Wilson) Kimbark. In 1920 Kimbark enrolled at Northwestern University where he earned his B.S. in 1924 and his E.E. in 1925. After graduation, he worked for two years as a substation operator and testing lab assistant for the Public Service Company of Northern Illinois at Evanston, and for two years as an instructor at the University of California, Berkeley.

He became the Assistant Curator for the Chicago Museum of Science and Industry, Division of Power, in 1929. After four years at this job, Kimbark decided to return to his studies. He enrolled at Massachusetts Institute of Technology, receiving an S.M. in 1933 and a Sc.D. in 1937. While at MIT Kimbark began writing articles and books, which he would continue to do throughout his life.

Kimbark began teaching soon after receiving his Sc.D., beginning at the Polytechnic Institute of Brooklyn. In 1939 he returned to Northwestern to teach. Here he eventually became the acting department chair, edited and taught from a textbook titled "Principles of Radar" at MIT's Radar School.

In 1950 Kimbark moved to Brazil to help initiate an electrical engineering program at the Instituto Tecnológico de Aeronáutica São Paulo. He taught electrical power systems engineering for the next five years, using his own English-language texts but lecturing and administering exams in self-taught Portuguese. (He was also proficient in French, German, and Russian, and was a lifelong proponent of Esperanto.)

Kimbark returned to the United States in 1955 for a position at Seattle University as the Dean of the School of Engineering. While at Seattle University he also became a consultant for Bonneville Power Administration in Portland, Oregon. In 1962 Kimbark began working for the BPA full-time as the head of the Network Analog Group.

Kimbark’s first wife Ruth died in 1976. He retired from full-time work at the BPA the same year. He continued to act as a consultant to the BPA until his death in 1982. He was survived by his second wife Iris.

== Works ==
- "Electrical Transmissions of Power and Signals" (1955)
- "Power System Stability" (1948)
- "Direct Current Transmission"(1971)
- "Principles of Radar"
