= Jack Ruina =

American academic and engineer

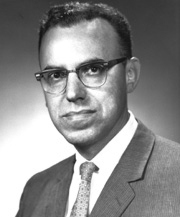

Jack P. Ruina (August 19, 1923 – February 4, 2015) was an American electrical engineer of Polish descent who was a professor of electrical engineering at the Massachusetts Institute of Technology (MIT) from 1963 until 1997 and thereafter an MIT professor emeritus. From 1966 to 1970, he was also vice president for special laboratories at MIT.

Ruina was born in Rypin, Poland in 1923, and emigrated to America three years later with his family.

Ruina received his PhD degree in electrical engineering from the New York University Tandon School of Engineering (then Polytechnic Institute of Brooklyn), He then served in positions at the U.S. Department of Defense, including deputy for research to the assistant secretary of research and engineering of the U.S. Air Force, Assistant Director of Defense Research and Engineering for the Office of the Secretary of Defense, and Director of the Advanced Research Projects Agency. In 1961, he was honored with the Arthur S. Flemming Award for being one of ten outstanding young men in government. From 1964 to 1966, during a two-year leave of absence from MIT, he served as president of the Institute for Defense Analyses in Arlington, Virginia.

While at MIT, Ruina served on government committees, including a presidential appointment to the General Advisory Committee from 1969 to 1977, and acting as senior consultant to the White House Office of Science and Technology Policy from 1977 to 1980. He was an honorary member of the Board of Trustees of the MITRE Corporation, and the editor with Jeffrey Porro and Carl Kaysen of the book The Nuclear Age Reader (1988).

Government offices
Preceded by Austin W. Betts	Director of ARPA; 1961–1963	Succeeded by Robert L. Sproull
