= Mark Ronald =

American engineer

Mark Ronald is an American engineer who works in the defense industry. Until 2007-01-02 he was President & CEO of BAE Systems Inc., the US subsidiary of BAE Systems plc and also served as a board member and Chief Operating Officer of BAE Systems plc.

In 2006 Ronald was received the John Curtis Sword Award from Aviation Week. The magazine's President Tom Henricks said "[Ronald's] energy and leadership across the Atlantic reflects the spirit of the Curtis Sword to foster Anglo-American aerospace cooperation."

He is a graduate of Bucknell University, where he received a Bachelor of Science in electrical engineering. He received his Master of Science in electrical engineering from the Polytechnic Institute of New York (now New York University Tandon School of Engineering).
