= Jerome Swartz =

American physicist

Jerome "Jerry" Swartz (born 1940) is a physicist who developed early optical strategies for barcode scanning technologies in the United States and co-founded the corporation, Symbol Technologies on Long Island, New York, with physicist partner, Dr. Shelley A. Harrison in 1973. Swartz was President, becoming the Chairman and Chief Scientist in 1982. In 2006 Symbol Technologies became a wholly owned subsidiary of the multinational telecommunications manufacturer, Motorola Corporation.

Swartz received a bachelor's degree in electrical engineering from The City College of New York and a Ph.D. also in electrical engineering from Polytechnic University in Brooklyn, receiving fellowships from the National Science Foundation and Ford Foundation along the way.

In 1999, he led Symbol to the National Medal of Technology, the U. S.'s highest honor for technology innovation. The award was presented to Swartz by President Clinton at the White House on March 14, 2000.

He is credited with more than 180 US patents and is the author of more than 30 published papers. He is a member of the National Academy of Engineering and a Fellow of the IEEE. https://patents.justia.com/inventor/jerome-c-swartz

In July 2003, Swartz resigned from his position as chairman and chief scientist of Symbol Technologies, at which time the company was under investigation for civil and criminal accounting fraud. At the time of his resignation, Swartz was quoted in the New York Times as stating that an internal investigation had shown that "improper finance and accounting activities occurred while he was chairman". Symbol agreed to settle the case with the Securities and Exchange Commission in June 2004, paying a $37 million penalty.

Currently, he is the Chairman of The Swartz Foundation for Computational Neuroscience. Established in 1994, it has grown to support research in 11 centers (Brandeis University, California Institute of Technology, Cold Spring Harbor Laboratory, Columbia University, Harvard University, New York University, Princeton University, Salk Institute, University of California, San Diego, University of California, San Francisco and Yale University). The Swartz Foundation funds the annual Swartz Prize for Theoretical and Computational Neuroscience.

== Awards ==
In 1998, he was awarded the IEEE Ernst Weber Engineering Leadership Recognition.

In 2000, he was elected a member of the National Academy of Engineering for bar code technologies, including laser scanners and wireless data capture.
