= Hung-Chang Lin =

- 凌宏璋
- Born: 8 August 1919; Shanghai, Republic of China
- Died: 5 March 2009 (aged 89)
- Citizenship: China
- Education: Shanghai Jiaotong University; University of Michigan; Polytechnic Institute of Brooklyn
- Known for: Wireless microphone Lateral transistor Quasi-complementary (transistor) amplifier circuit
- Spouse: Anchen Lin
- Awards: J J Ebers Award (1978)

Hung Chang Lin (Jimmy Lin) (Chinese: 凌宏璋; pinyin: Líng Hóngzhāng; Wade–Giles: Ling Hung-chang; August 8, 1919 – March 5, 2009) was a Chinese-American inventor and a professor of electrical engineering at the University of Maryland.

== Early life and education ==
Lin was born in Shanghai, China. He attended Shanghai Jiaotong University, China on a tennis scholarship. Lin graduated with B.S. in electrical engineering in 1941. In 1948 he received the M.S. degree in electrical engineering from the University of Michigan. In 1956 he received the Doctor of Electrical Engineering from the Polytechnic Institute of Brooklyn.

== Career ==
After graduating from Shanghai Jiaotong University, Lin worked for the Central Radio Works and Central Broadcasting Administration as an engineer. He left China in 1947 to begin his graduate work.

After he earned his master's and doctorate degrees, Lin was worked at RCA Laboratories and was one of the first scientists to work on transistor circuit development. Lin was the first inventor to incorporate p-n-p or complementary integrated circuits. He later worked for CBS and Westinghouse Electric Corporation, researching and developing electrical engineering practices.

In 1969, Lin began teaching at the University of Maryland. He worked at the university until his retirement in 1990. While a professor, Lin supervised and mentored 26 PhD students. He also worked part-time as an adjunct and visiting professor at the University of Pittsburgh and University of California, Berkeley, respectively.

Hung C. Lin held more than 60 U.S. patents. Among his inventions is the quasi-complementary (transistor) amplifier circuit, which has been used in many commercial audio amplifiers. Another of his inventions is the lateral transistor which is used in linear integrated circuits and TTL digital integrated circuits. He also invented the wireless microphone.

He has published more than 170 professional papers mostly on transistors and integrated circuits.

In 1978 he was presented with the J J Ebers Award from the IEEE. In 1990, Lin was inducted into the A. James Clark School of Engineering Innovation Hall of Fame at the University of Maryland. In 2000 he was elected to be academician of Academia Sinica.

== Death and legacy ==
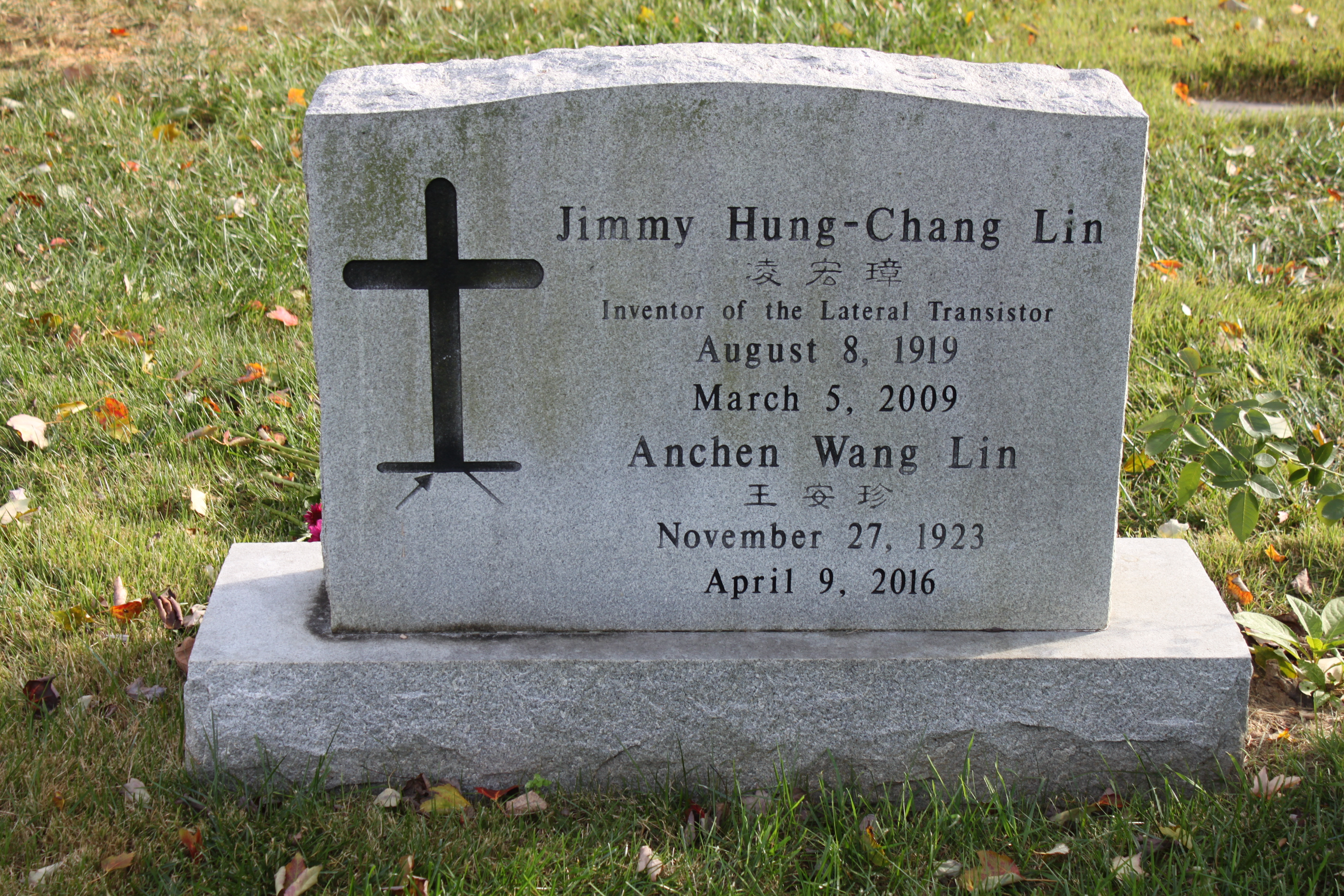
Grave of Lin in Columbia Gardens Cemetery

Lin died in Silver Spring, Maryland of lung cancer at the age of 89. He is interred at Columbia Gardens Cemetery.

In 2011, his wife Anchen Lin donated to the University of Maryland School of Engineering to fund the Jimmy Lin Endowment for Entrepreneurship. The goal of the endowment was "to provide annual awards to students, staff, and faculty who transform their ideas into innovations through invention and technology commercialization."
