= Israel Borovich =

Israeli businessman

- ישראל בורוביץ
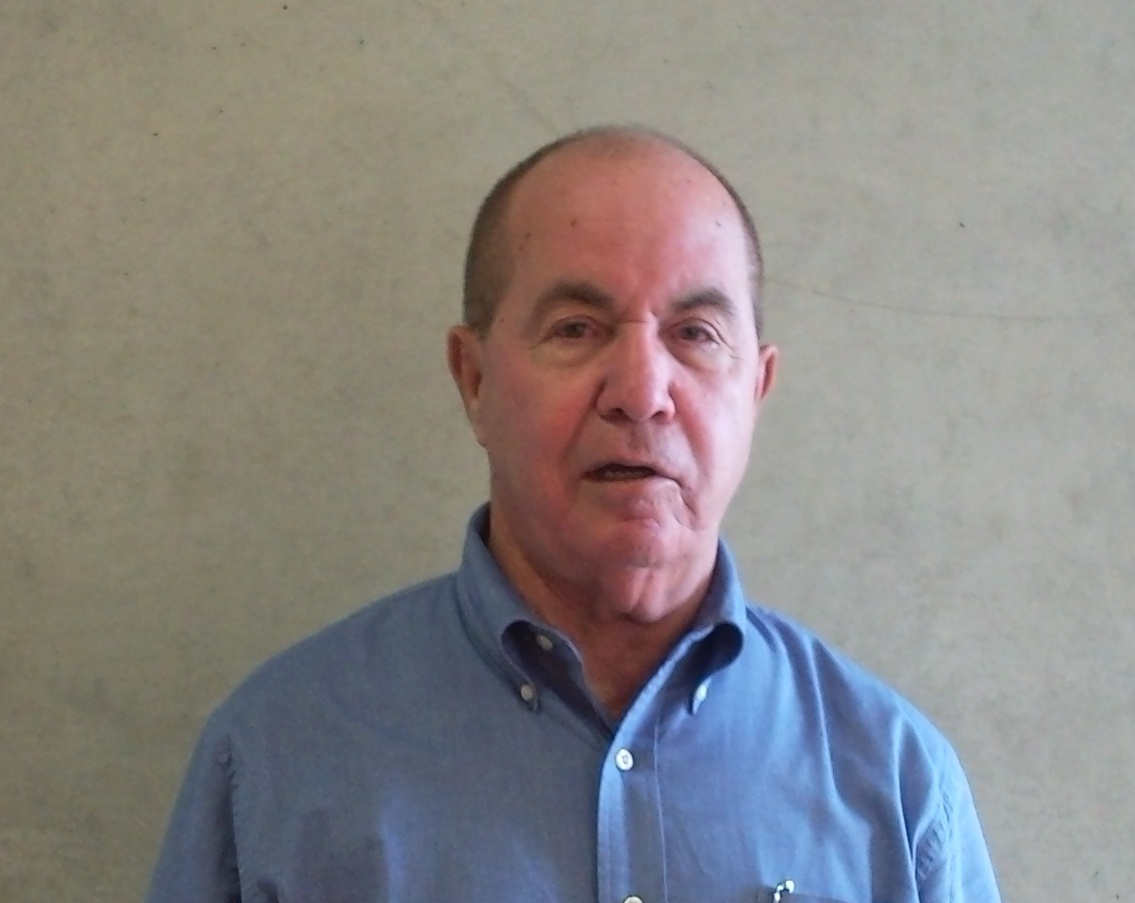
- Born: 30 June 1941 (age 84); Tel Aviv, Israel
- Spouse: Yael Borovich

Israel Borovich (Hebrew: ישראל בורוביץ; born June 30, 1941, in Tel Aviv) is the former CEO and chairman of the Board of EL AL. He is also a Professor Emeritus of Tel Aviv University. He graduated from NYU Poly with degrees in industrial engineering.

He has been heavily involved in investment companies such as being Chairman of Granit Hacarmel Investments Ltd., Nativei Aylon Ltd. and Sonol Israel Ltd., an investment management company and Deputy Chairman of K'nafaim Holdings Ltd. From 1988 to 2004 he was also engaged in Knafaim-Arkia Holdings Ltd.
