= New York University Tandon School of Engineering =

University in Brooklyn, New York, U.S.

- Type: Private
- Established: 1854 (as the Brooklyn Collegiate and Polytechnic Institute)
- Parent institution: New York University
- Academic affiliations: Space-grant
- Dean: Juan J. de Pablo
- Faculty: 396
- Students: 6,323
- Undergraduates: 2,761
- Postgraduates: 3,562
- Location: Brooklyn, New York, United States; 40.694412°N 73.986531°W
- Campus: Urban, 15 acres (excluding CUSP and leased space)
- Website: engineering.nyu.edu

The New York University Tandon School of Engineering (also referred to as NYU Tandon) is the engineering school of New York University. Tandon is the second oldest private engineering and technology school in the United States.

The school dates back to 1854 when its predecessor institutions were separately founded: the University of the City of New York School of Civil Engineering and Architecture, which evolved into the NYU College of Engineering; and the Brooklyn Collegiate and Polytechnic Institute, which evolved into Polytechnic Institute. In 1973, Polytechnic Institute acquired the College of Engineering from NYU, but in 2008, Polytechnic was absorbed by NYU to become its new engineering school. In 2015, NYU renamed the engineering school in honor of NYU Trustees Chandrika and Ranjan Tandon following their donation of $100 million to the school.

The school's main campus is in Brooklyn's MetroTech Center, an urban academic-industrial research park. It is one of several engineering schools that were founded based on a European polytechnic university model in the 1800s, in response to the increasing industrialization of the United States. It has been a key center of research in the development of microwave, Wireless, radar, electronics in general, polymers, industrial engineering, operations research and the US space program.

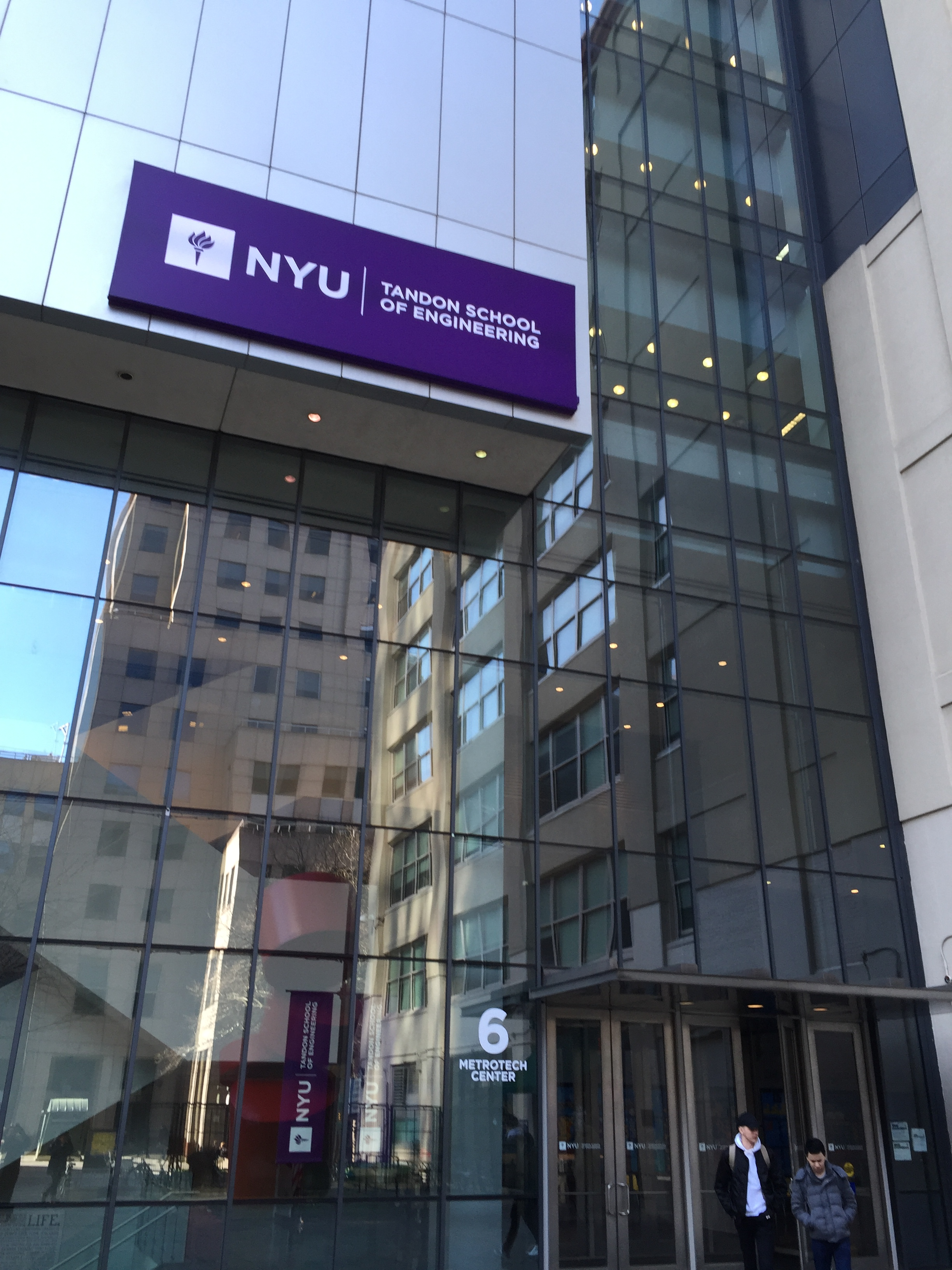
NYU Tandon School of Engineering

== History ==
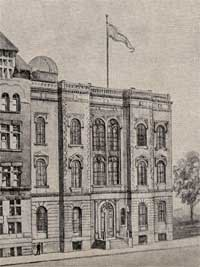
Polytechnic Institute at 99 Livingston

=== Predecessor institutions ===
==== Brooklyn Collegiate and Polytechnic Institute ====
On May 17, 1853, a group of Brooklyn businessmen wrote a charter to establish a school for young men. Founded as the Brooklyn Collegiate and Polytechnic Institute, the school moved into its first home at 99 Livingston Street in Brooklyn. The first class, admitted in 1855, consisted of 265 young men aged nine to 17. The school conferred its first bachelor's degrees in 1871. Graduate programs began in 1901, and the school awarded its first doctoral degree in 1921. From 1889 to 1973, the school became known as the Polytechnic Institute of Brooklyn.

In 1917, the preparatory program separated from the Institute and became the Polytechnic Preparatory Country Day School. Polytechnic Institute moved to its present location in 1957, the former site of the American Safety Razor Company factory, where it became a co-educational institution.

==== School of Civil Engineering and Architecture ====
In 1854, the University of the City of New York, now New York University, founded the School of Civil Engineering and Architecture at a time when specialized schools of engineering were uncommon in America. Classes began in 1855 and the school awarded its first undergraduate degree in 1857. As the industrial revolution took shape, the school formalized its engineering curriculum and the school's first dean, Charles H. Snow, changed the name of the school to the School of Applied Science. During this time the engineering school officially separated from the university's arts and science school, then called University College.

In 1894, the University of the City of New York moved its engineering school to a new campus in the Bronx. The new campus gave the university space to build larger science laboratories that could not be constructed at its Washington Square site. With the addition of the new campus, under the leadership of Chancellor Henry Mitchell MacCracken, the University of the City of New York renamed itself New York University. The neighborhood surrounding the Bronx campus eventually became known as University Heights. By 1920, separate electrical and chemical engineering departments were created, and the school changed its name to the New York University College of Engineering.

=== Acquisition of NYU College of Engineering by Polytechnic Institute ===
Enrollment at New York University expanded considerably from the early 1900s into the postwar decades. However, by the early 1970s, this growth ceased due to rising crime and financial troubles in New York City. New York University faced financial hardships leading it to sell its University Heights campus that housed its engineering school to City University of New York, which in turn renamed the campus Bronx Community College. From 1969 to 1975, Polytechnic Institute of Brooklyn was forced to rely on subsidies provided by New York state to keep the school afloat. The state supported Polytechnic on the basis that closing the school would create economic hardship locally. With both the Polytechnic Institute of Brooklyn and New York University facing financial difficulties, the state brokered a merger with New York University's engineering school. The Polytechnic Institute of Brooklyn acquired the faculty, programs and students of New York University's engineering school to form the Polytechnic Institute of New York. Polytechnic Institute of New York gained university status in 1985 and changed its name to the Polytechnic University.

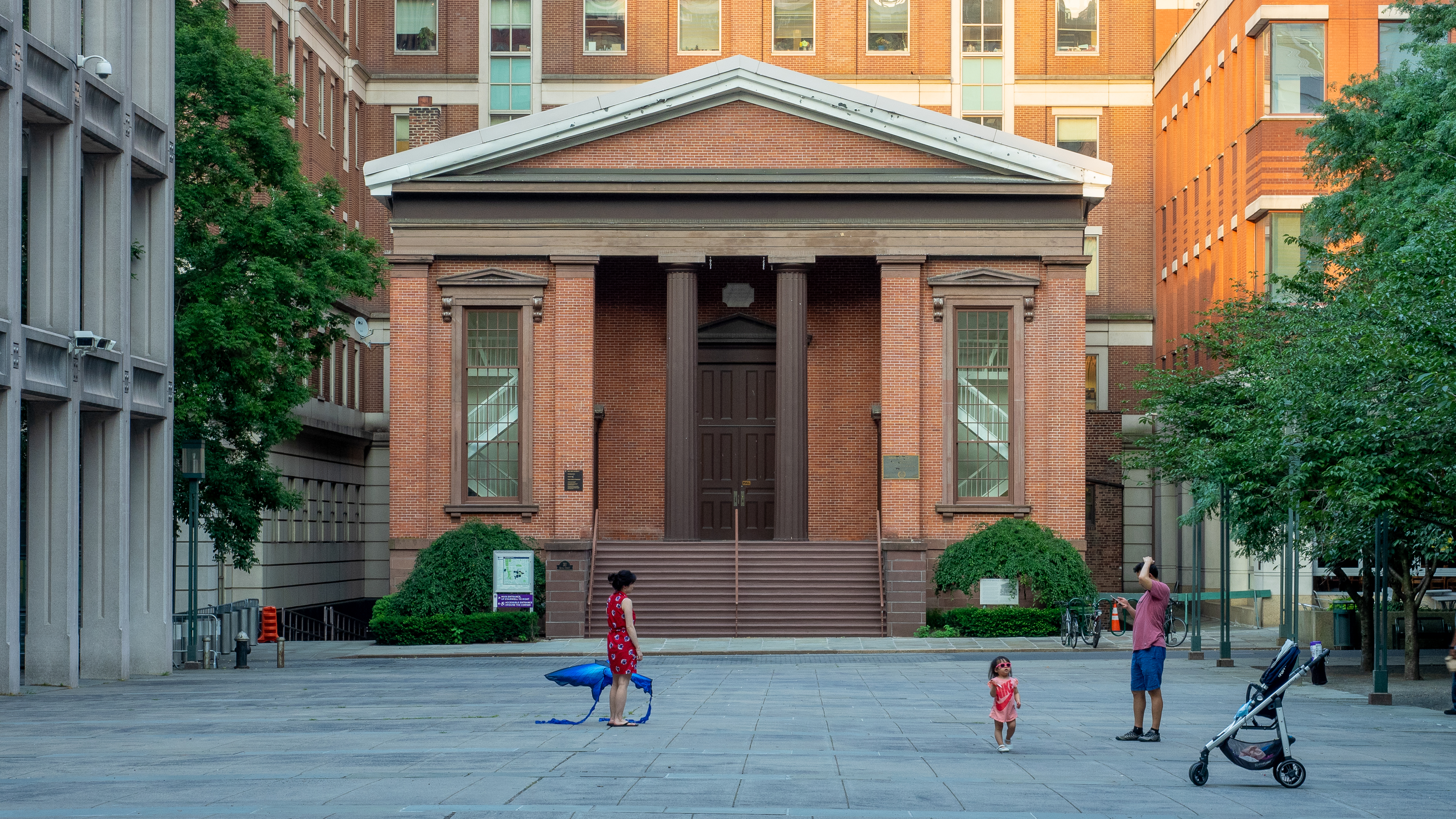
Wunsch Hall, the oldest building on campus, stands in contrast to the more modern buildings of MetroTech Center, including the adjacent Dibner Library.

By 1986, the Polytechnic University in Brooklyn was the largest technological university in the New York metropolitan area and the second-largest in graduate enrollment in the nation after the Massachusetts Institute of Technology. Of the 300 engineering schools in the United States, Polytechnic had the second-largest graduate enrollment and was among the most successful institutions in the country as a producer of science and engineering graduates who went on to doctoral studies. An average of 7.2 percent of Polytechnic graduates went on to achieve a Ph.D., compared with two other schools with large engineering programs: Carnegie Mellon, with an average of 6 percent, and Princeton, with 4.5 percent. Polytechnic University became well known for its research centers in electrophysics and polymer blends.

==== Partnership with Stevens Institute of Technology ====
Prior to its merger with New York University, Polytechnic University maintained an active research partnership with the Stevens Institute of Technology in Hoboken, New Jersey. In January 2008, the two institutions jointly received a two-year, $570,000 grant from the National Science Foundation's Partnership for Innovation Program. The grant funded the creation of a joint Environmental Entrepreneurship Lab (E2-Lab), designed to accelerate the commercialization of environmental innovations either through adoption by existing companies or through the formation of new ventures. The collaboration was led on Polytechnic's side by Associate Provost for Research Kurt H. Becker and Director of Technology Transfer Bruce Niswander, and on Stevens' side by Lex McCusker, Dean of the Stevens Howe School of Technology Management.

=== Merger between Polytechnic University and NYU ===
Enrollment history
1986	5,100 students
2015	5,212 students

Discussions about a merger with Polytechnic University and New York University began in 2004. Four years later, in 2008, Polytechnic University and New York University agreed to take steps toward a merger beginning with a formal affiliation between the two schools; this affiliation resulted in the school changing its name to the Polytechnic Institute of New York University. The schools officially merged in 2014 when the New York State Regents approved the change of charter making NYU the sole member of Polytechnic University.

Since the merger, applications to the school and incoming SAT scores have increased substantially. The school has also experienced an influx of students coming from outside of New York state. Fundraising and faculty research awards have increased since the merger. The school also opened a bioengineering facility in partnership with the medical and dental schools.

The school has had several fundraising campaigns over the years. From 2001 to 2005 the school raised more than $275 million. Alumnus Joseph J. Jacobs, who founded Jacobs Engineering Group, one of the largest engineering and construction companies in the world, gave the school more than $30 million over the course of his life.

A gift of US$100 million from Chandrika and Ranjan Tandon in 2015 resulted in the school changing its name to the Tandon School of Engineering. New York University has committed to investing over $500 million to its engineering school in the coming years. In 2022, NYU announced it will invest $1 billion in the school to hire 40 tenure-track faculty members, improve lab and student spaces, and bolster the cybersecurity and artificial intelligence programs.

== Name ==
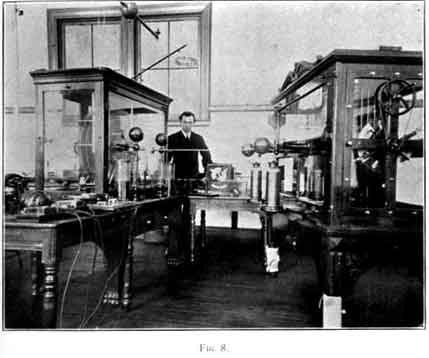
Polytechnic Institute Electrostatic Laboratory 1903–1904

The school started from two origins and has carried a number of different names:

- 1854: Brooklyn Collegiate and Polytechnic Institute; University of the City of New York School of Civil Engineering and Architecture (founding names, separate institutions)
- 1889: Polytechnic Institute of Brooklyn (also spun out Polytechnic Preparatory Country Day School)
- 1896: New York University School of Applied Science (separate from Polytechnic Institute of Brooklyn)
- 1920: New York University College of Engineering (separate from Polytechnic Institute of Brooklyn)
- 1973: Polytechnic Institute of New York (acquired the faculty, programs and students of New York University College of Engineering)
- 1985: Polytechnic University (acquired university status)
- 2008: Polytechnic Institute of New York University (affiliated with New York University)
- 2014: New York University Polytechnic School of Engineering (merged with New York University)
- 2015: New York University Tandon School of Engineering

== Campuses ==
The NYU Tandon School of Engineering main campus is in Downtown Brooklyn and is close to public transportation routes. It is located in the Brooklyn Tech Triangle and about a 20-minute subway ride from NYU's main campus in Lower Manhattan. It is also connected to the Washington Square campus by the NYU Shuttle Bus system. In addition to its main address at MetroTech Center in Downtown Brooklyn, the school offers programs in Manhattan. The school is an integral part of NYU Abu Dhabi, NYU Shanghai and the NYU Center for Urban Science and Progress (CUSP) in downtown Brooklyn.

=== Brooklyn campus ===
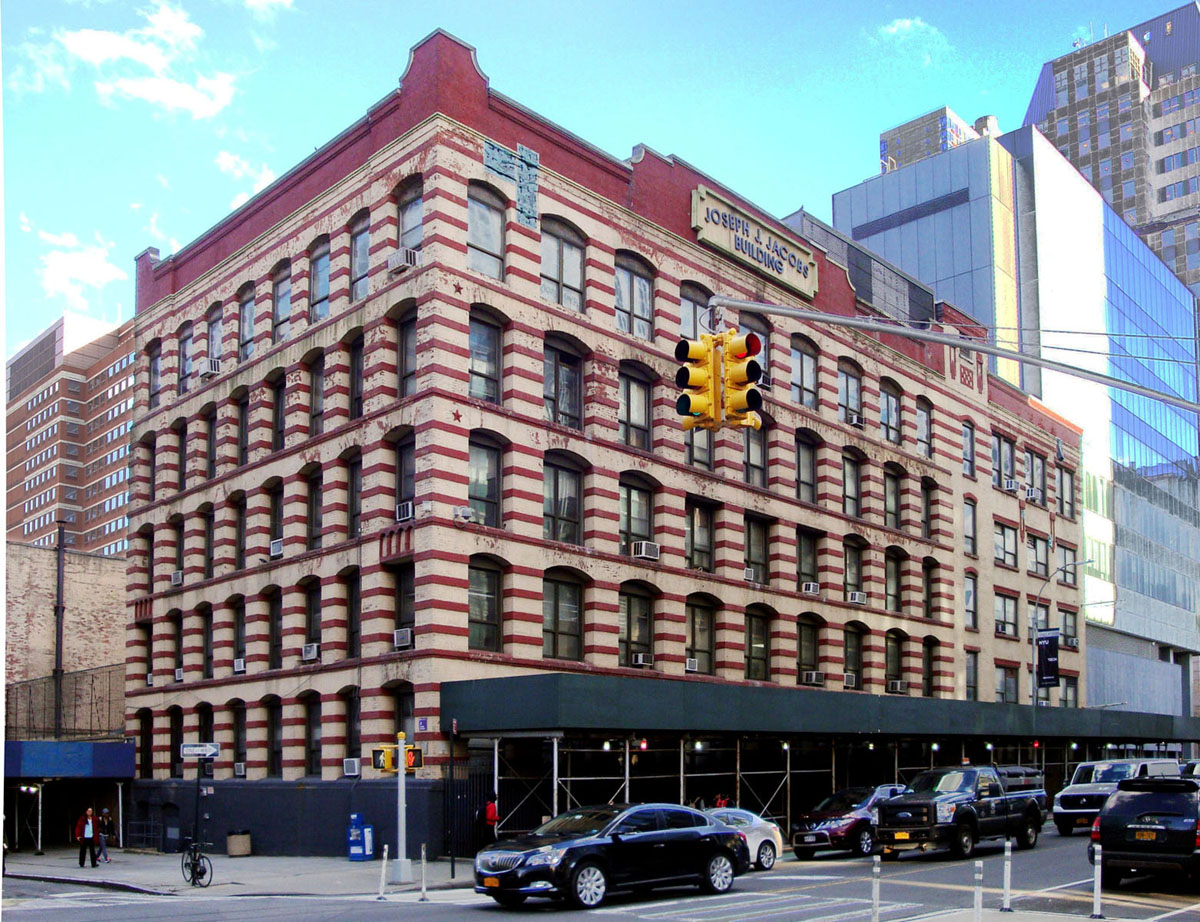
Jacobs administrative building of NYU Tandon School of Engineering

The school played a major role in bringing about MetroTech Center, one of the largest urban university-corporate parks in the United States, while closing down the larger campus at its former Long Island Graduate Center. Today, the 16-acre, $1 billion complex in Brooklyn includes the school's main campus, along with several technology-dependent companies such as Securities Industry Automation Corporation (SIAC), as well as New York City Police Department's 9-1-1 Center, New York City Fire Department Headquarters and the U.S. technology and operations functions of JPMorgan Chase.

The school has seven buildings in Brooklyn, as well as leased spaces in some other nearby buildings. The seven buildings are as follows:

- Jacobs Academic Building
- Jacobs Administration Building
- Rogers Hall
- Wunsch Building
- Dibner Building
- Othmer Residence Hall
- Civil Engineering Building (currently closed)

An eighth 460,000-square-foot space at 370 Jay St, adjacent to Rogers Hall, which houses the Center for Urban Science and Progress and other academic units within NYU, opened in Fall 2017.

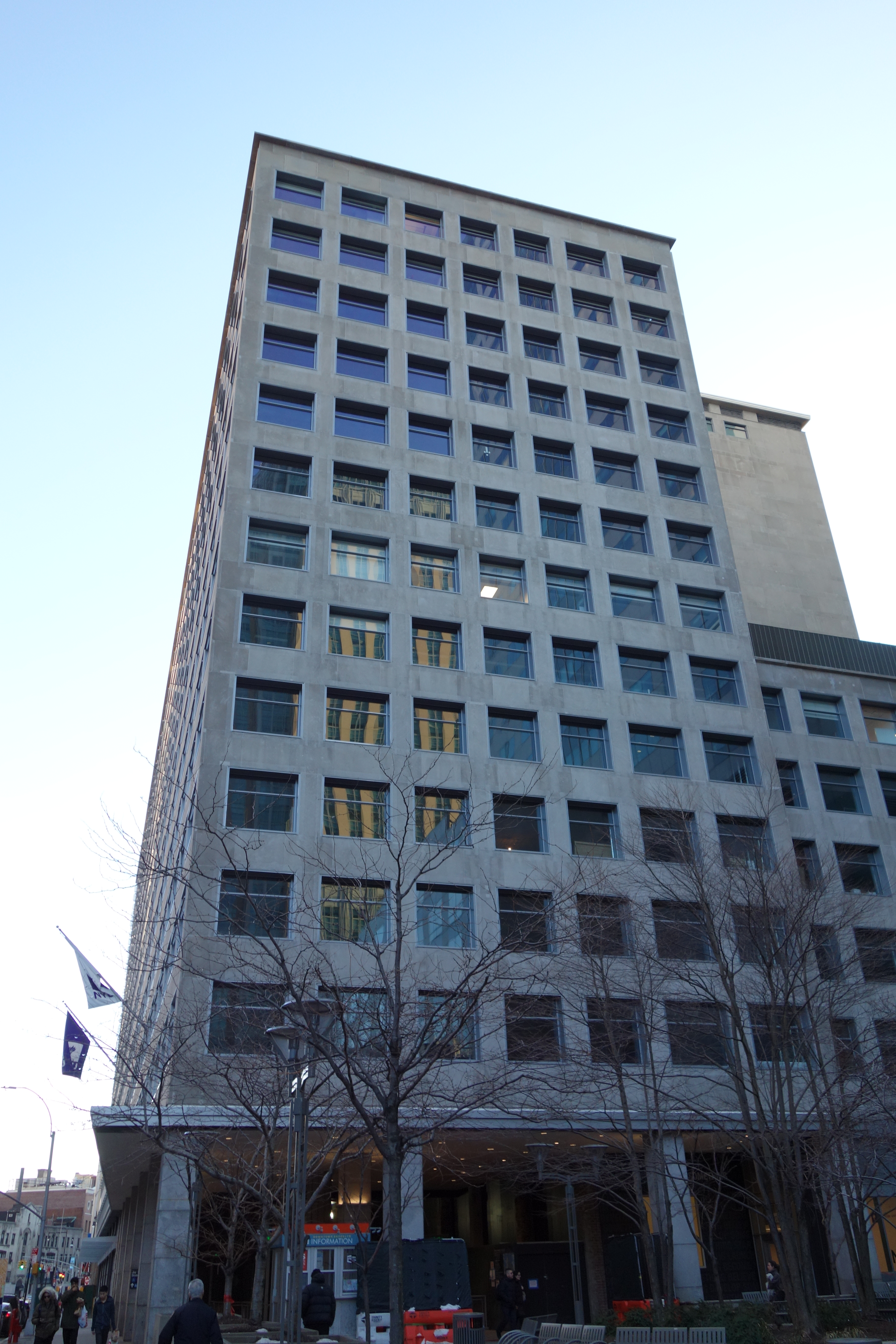
370 Jay St Building

The building at 333 Jay Street was the factory site for a number of razor blade companies. The last was the American Safety Razor Company. It relocated to Staunton, Virginia in 1954, giving the Polytechnic Institute of Brooklyn its new campus.

=== Manhattan sites ===
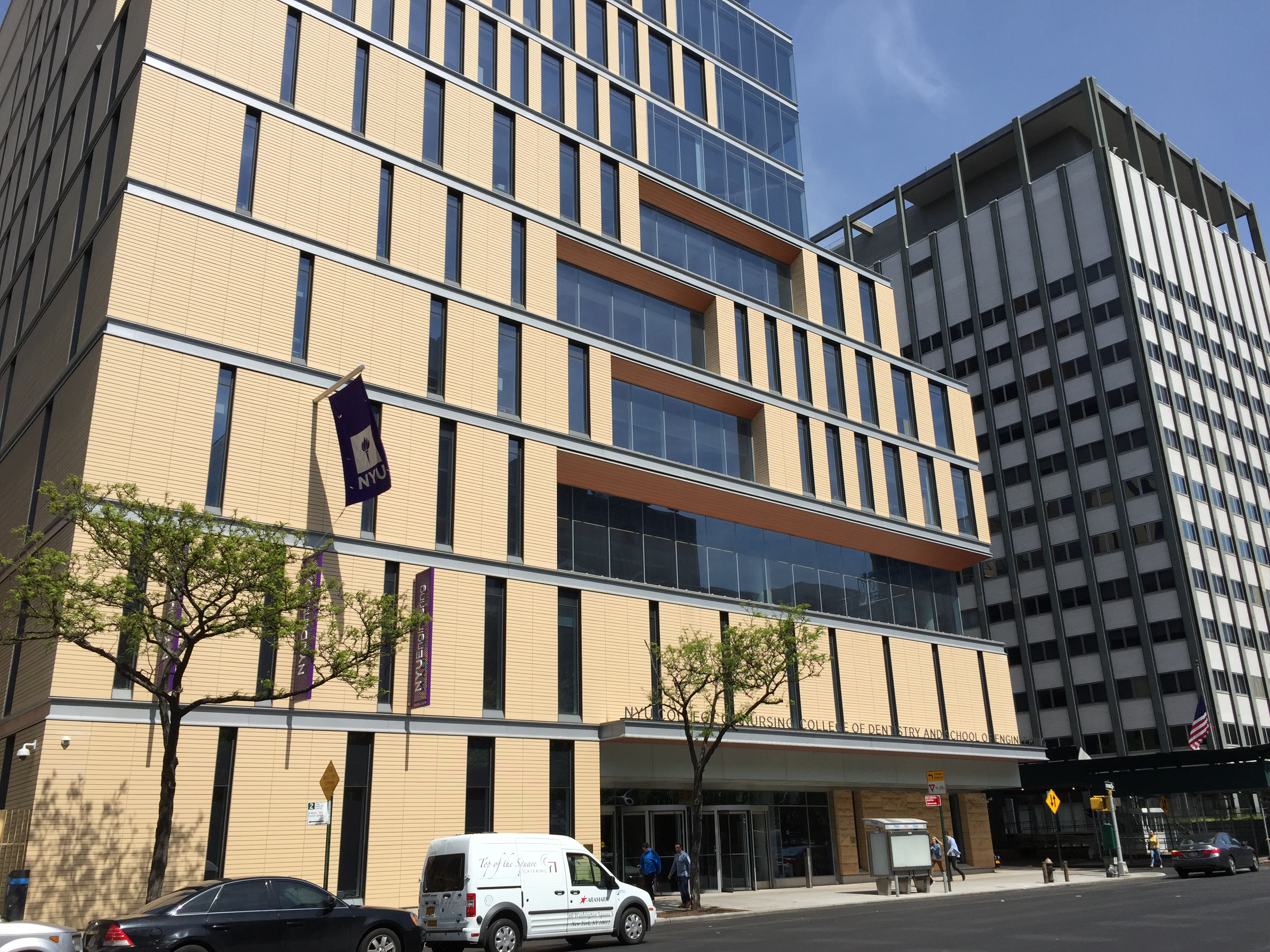
Biomatrix Research Center

The Bioengineering Institute research facility is located at 433 First Avenue in Manhattan. The School of Engineering and Colleges of Nursing and Dentistry are located in the building where chemical, biomolecular engineers, as well as mechanical engineers do research in biomaterials and biotherapeutics for regenerative medicine.

The engineering school also has a location in downtown Manhattan. The downtown site offers degree programs in Financial Engineering, Management of Technology, Information Management and Accelerated Management of Technology, and the Exec 21 Construction Management certificate.

=== Online ===
NYU Tandon Digital Learning (formerly known as NYU Tandon Online) is the digital learning department at NYU Tandon School of Engineering which offers four master's degrees, an advanced graduate certificate, and certificate of completion programs fully online. Focused on peer-to-peer engagement, the unit has been recognized as providing one of the top online learning programs by the Online Learning Consortium among others.

== Academic profile ==
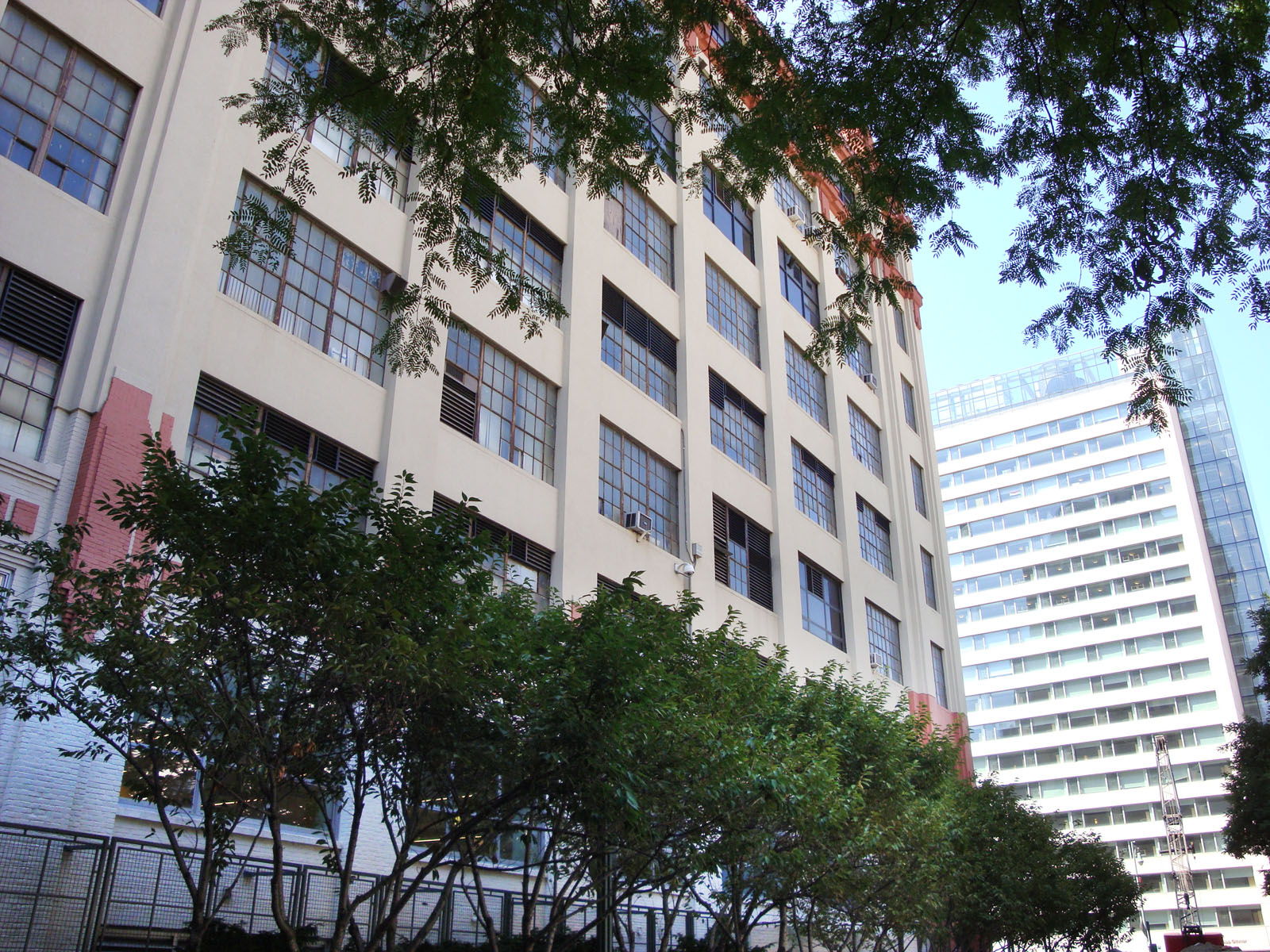
Rogers Hall, main academic building and Othmer dormitory building on the background

=== Departments ===
- Applied Physics
- Biomedical Engineering
- Chemical and Biomolecular Engineering
- Civil and Urban Engineering
- Computer Science and Engineering
- Electrical and Computer Engineering
- Finance and Risk Engineering
- Mathematics (merged into the Courant Department of Mathematics)
- Mechanical and Aerospace Engineering
- Technology, Culture and Society
- Technology Management and Innovation (affiliated with Leonard N. Stern School of Business)

=== Accreditation ===
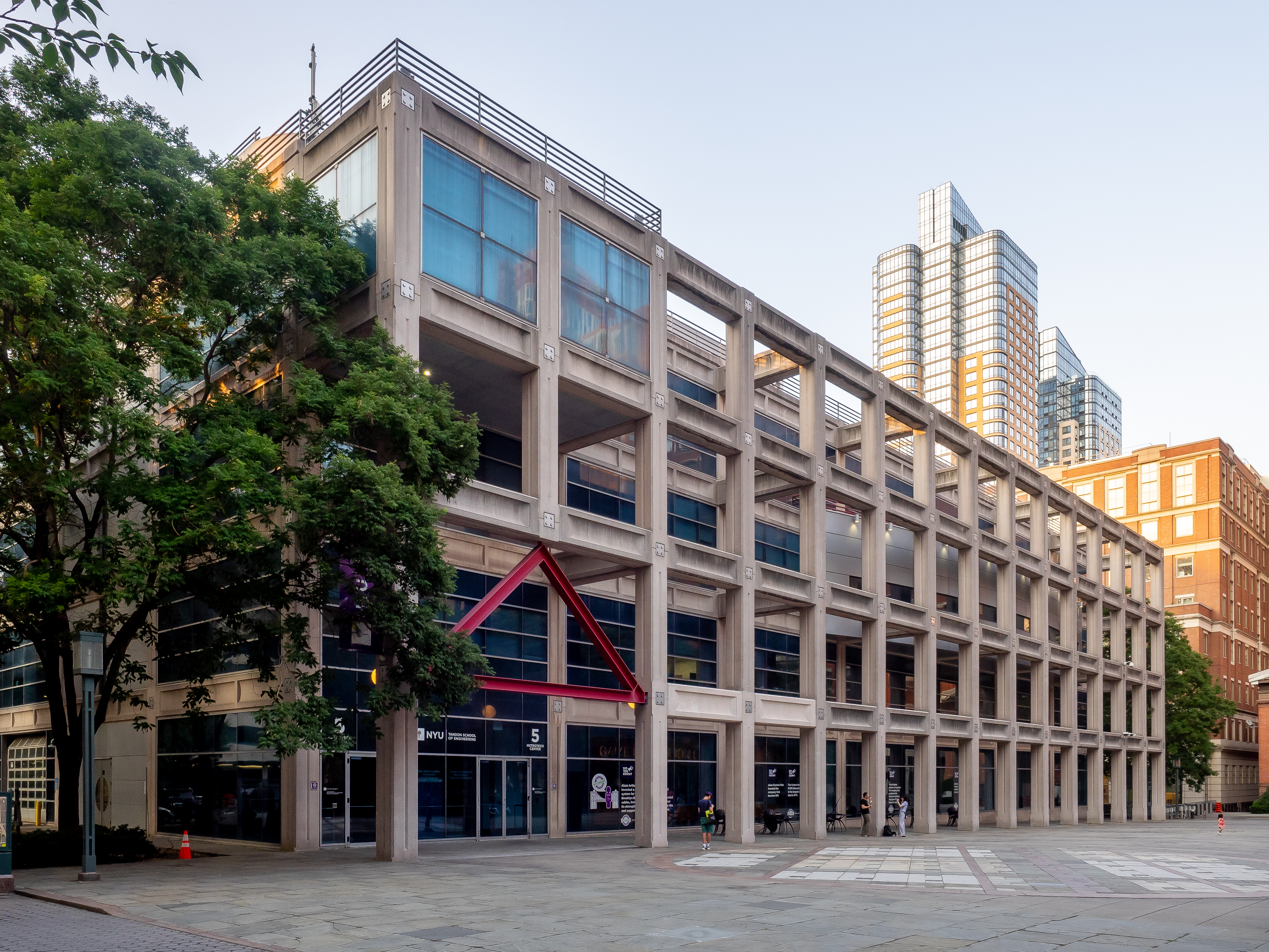
Bern Dibner Library matches the modern architectural style of Downtown Brooklyn.

All undergraduate and graduate programs at the engineering school are accredited by the Middle States Association. Undergraduate chemistry students have the option to pursue a degree approved by the American Chemical Society (ACS). The Accreditation Board for Engineering and Technology (ABET), the Computer Science Accreditation Board (CSAB), Institute of Electrical and Electronics Engineers (IEEE), American Society of Civil Engineers (ASCE), International Association of Financial Engineers (IAFE), Institute of Industrial Engineers (IIE), American Society of Mechanical Engineers (ASME), Construction Management Association of America (CMAA), American Institute of Chemical Engineers (AIChE), American Society for Metals, Society of Manufacturing Engineers (SME), American Academy of Environmental Engineers (AAEE), Biomedical Engineering Society (BMES), American Chemical Society (ACS), American Physical Society (APS) and the Joint Policy Board for Mathematics (JPBM) have recognized the school's undergraduate and graduate programs in engineering, computer science and physics, chemistry and mathematics.

=== Admissions ===
Tandon's incoming classes typically consist of about 700 students, with a total academic population of over 5,000. For Fall 2019, the average SAT scores for incoming freshmen was 1448. The acceptance rate for graduate programs in 2016 was 28%. The PhD student-faculty ratio in 2018 was 3.6:1.

For Fall 2018, international students represented 91 countries and domestic students represented 47 U.S States. The students are 28.8% women and 71.2% men.

=== Rankings ===
- Ranked #2 by U.S. News & World Report Best Online Graduate Computer Information Technology Program in 2019
- Ranked #20 by U.S. News & World Report Best Online Graduate Engineering Programs in 2019
- Ranked #1 by The Princeton Review Top Graduate Schools for Video Game Design in 2019
- Ranked #5 by Risk.net's Top 25 quant finance master's programmes in the world
- Ranked #25 in 2020 U.S. News Best Global Universities for Electrical and Electronic Engineering
- Ranked #21 in Construction Week Online – The world's top 25 universities for civil engineering in 2019
- Ranked #38 in U.S. News Best Engineering Schools Ranked in 2021.
- Ranked #66 in U.S. News 2019 undergraduate engineering programs.
- Ranked #65 in 2020 Times Higher Education World University Rankings by subject: engineering and technology
- Ranked #81 in 2020 U.S. News Best Global Universities for Engineering

== Research ==
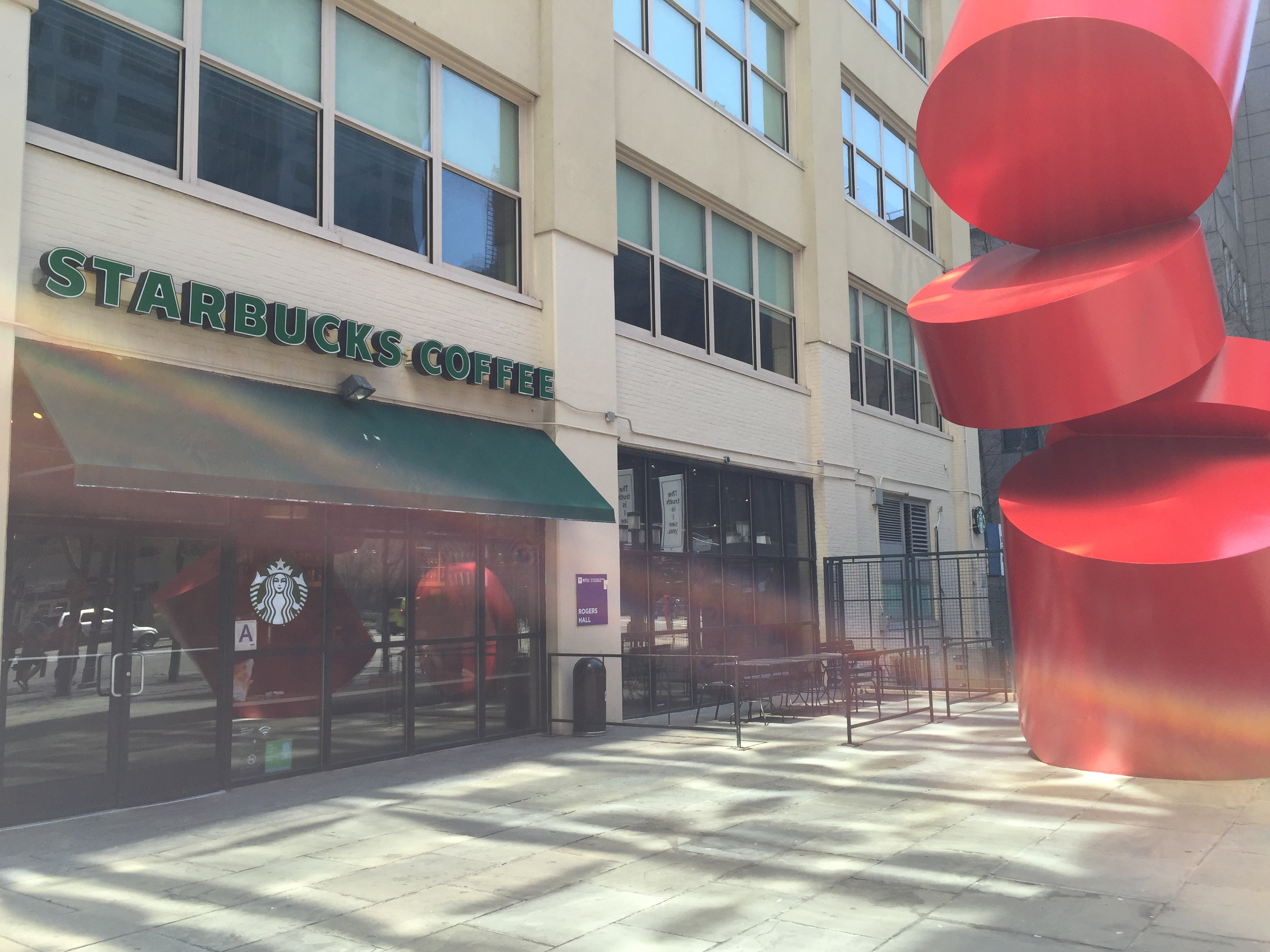
Starbucks cafe, by the entrance to Rogers Hall

In 2023, the school reported $59 million in research expenditures. Some of the school's first research institutes included the Polymer Research Institute, established in 1942, and the Microwave Research Institute, established in 1945. The American Chemical Society designated the Polymer Research Institute as a National Historic Chemical Landmark on September 3, 2003. The Microwave Research Institute developed electromagnetic and microwave defense and communication systems and later renamed itself the Weber Research Institute. Other notable research centers of the institute include NSF-sponsored Wireless Internet Center for Advanced Technology (WICAT), which ranked #1 among technology research centers in funding and #2 in the number of industry participants according to the United States National Science Foundation, Center for Advanced Technologies in Telecommunications (CATT), a New York State and NSF sponsored research center that is also affiliated with Columbia University, NSF-funded Internet Security and Information Systems Lab, a U.S. National Security Agency (NSA) designated Center of Excellence in Information Assurance, Information Assurance Education and a Center of Excellence in Research, and the New York State Resiliency Institute for Storms & Emergencies (NYS RISE), which is housed jointly at NYU's Brooklyn campus, and Stony Brook University.

Over the years the school has been a key center of research in the development of microwave physics, radar, polymers and the space program. During World War II the school's Microwave Research Institute worked on problems whose solution led to the development of radar, and later broke ground in electromagnetic theory and electronics in general. In later years the school participated in the space program, solving re-entry problems of crewed space capsules.

The school has been affiliated with some major inventions and innovations including: the Panama Canal locks; lockmaking; the Brooklyn Bridge cables; cable-lift elevators; cordless phones; ATMs; bar codes; laser; radar; penicillin; polymers; elevator brakes; lightweight, ultra durable automotive brake rotor; light beer; cardiac defibrillator; artificial cardiac pacemaker; RFID; contact lenses; zoom lens; first telephone handset; commercial television; non-stick coating as an application of Teflon; suspension system for the largest radio telescope; microwave technology; Apollo Lunar Module, the first, and to date only, crewed spacecraft to operate exclusively in the airless vacuum of space; X-ray crystallography; structure of the DNA molecule; submarine; modern refrigerator; A/C generator; electric motors; transformer; submarine communications facilities; development of the artificial sweetener aspartame; development of nontoxic processes to create food colorings and remove caffeine from coffee; the quasi-complementary (transistor) amplifier circuit; lateral transistor; the wireless microphone; as well as Eugene Kleiner's first semiconductor (and much of the Silicon Valley), and Spencer Trask's investing and supporting of Thomas Edison's invention of the electric light bulb.

=== Academic labs ===
Academic labs and research centers include:

- Computational Mechanics Laboratory
- Dynamical Systems Laboratory
- Brooklyn Experimental Media Center (formerly Integrated Digital Media Institute)
- Wireless Implementation Testbed Laboratory
- Bio-interfacial Engineering and Diagnostics Lab
- Control and Telecommunications Research Laboratory
- High-Speed Networking Lab
- Power and Power Electronics Engineering Laboratory
- CITE Game Innovation Lab
- Protein Engineering and Molecular Design Laboratory
- Translational Neuroengineering (associated with the NYU Center for Neural Science and the NYU Langone Medical Center)
- Urban Future Lab (founded in partnership with the New York City Economic Development Corporation)

=== Research centers ===
Research at the engineering school is conducted either through academic departments or through one of many interdisciplinary research centers including:

- Center for Advanced Technology in Telecommunications (CATT)
- Center for Finance and Technology (CFT)
- Institute for Mathematics and Advanced Supercomputing (IMAS)
- Polymer Research Institute (PRI)
- Urban Intelligent Transportation Systems Center (UITSC)
- Wireless Internet Center for Advanced Technology (WICAT)
- CRISSP (Cyber-Security; includes Tandon School of Engineering, Wagner Graduate School, Courant Institute of Mathematical Sciences, Stern School of Business, John Jay College of Criminal Justice, Steinhardt School of Culture, Education, and Human Development)
- Weber Research Institute
- Research Center for Risk Engineering
- Materials Research Science and Engineering Center
- Rehabilitation Engineering Research Center
- The Games for Learning Institute
- Media and Games Network (MAGNET)
- New York State Resiliency Institute for Storms & Emergencies (includes NYU, Stony Brook University, Columbia University, Cornell University, City University of New York and Brookhaven National Laboratory)
- NYU WIRELESS
- Biomatrix Research Center (located in Manhattan)

=== CUSP ===
The Center for Urban Science and Progress (CUSP) is a degree-granting research facility of NYU located at 370 Jay Street in Downtown Brooklyn, New York and is adjacent to NYU School of Engineering's Rogers Hall.

== Notable faculty and alumni ==
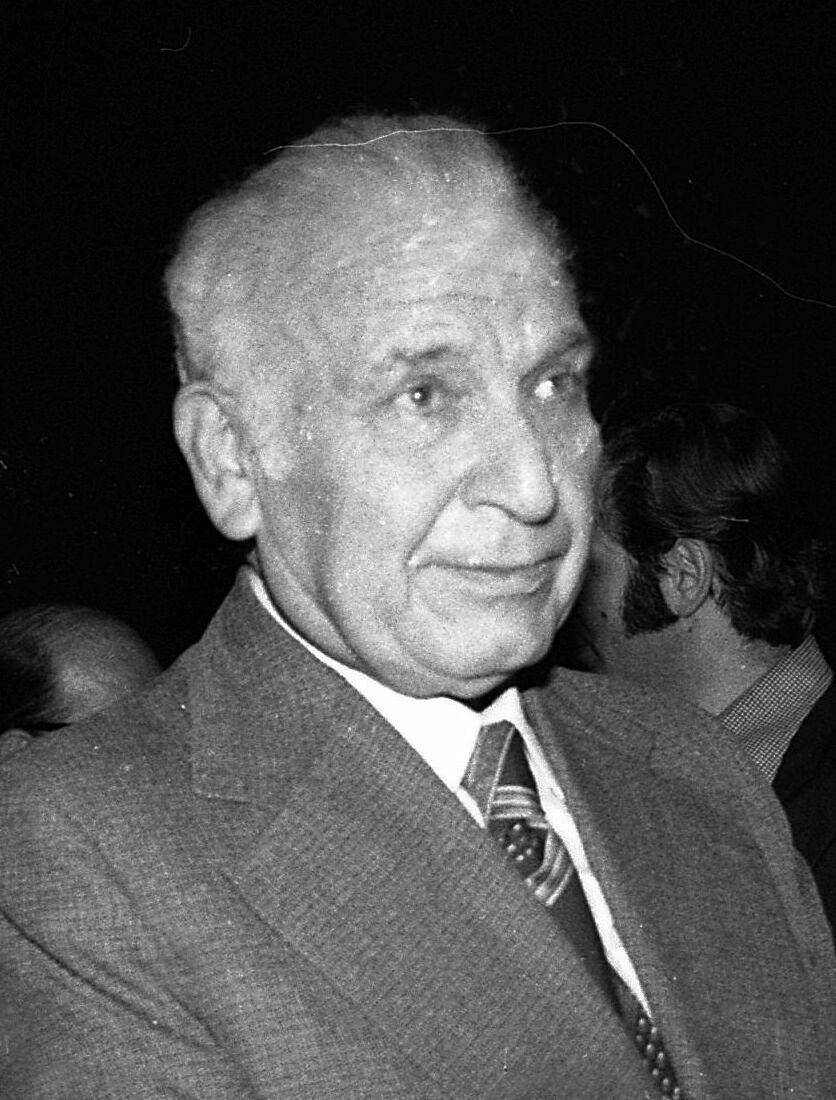
Ephraim Katzir, alumnus, fourth president of Israel

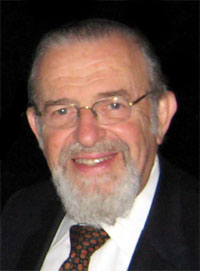
Norman Lamm, alumnus, third president of Yeshiva University

New York University Tandon School of Engineering had over 33,000 living alumni living in 68 countries as of 2015. The school's alumni include inventors, scientists, entrepreneurs, politicians, country presidents, university presidents, academic leaders (including NYU Stern's founder Charles Waldo Haskins) and more than 2,000 CEOs and leaders at large corporations. Among its past and present graduates and faculty are at least four Nobel Prize winners; seven National Medals for Science, Technology and Innovation winners; two astronauts; Russ Prize, IEEE Edison Medal, Turing Award, Gordon Prize and Draper Prize winners; and over 100 National Academy of Engineering members.

=== Nobel laureates ===
- Francis Crick, Nobel Prize in Physiology or Medicine for being a co-discoverer of the structure of the DNA molecule
- Gertrude B. Elion, Nobel Prize in Physiology or Medicine
- Rudolph Marcus, Nobel Prize in Chemistry
- Martin Perl, Nobel Prize in Physics in 1995 for his discovery of the tau lepton

=== National Medals for Science, Technology and Innovation ===
- Joel S. Engel
- Richard J. Gambino
- Rudolph A. Marcus
- Herman Francis Mark
- Jerome Swartz, developed early optical strategies for barcode scanning technologies
- John G. Trump
- Ernst Weber

=== Russ Prize, Gordon Prize, Draper Prize ===
- Clive Dym
- Joel S. Engel
- Elmer L. Gaden
- Harold S. Goldberg

=== IEEE Edison Medal ===
- Bancroft Gherardi, Jr.
- William B. Kouwenhoven, invented the closed-chest cardiac defibrillator

=== Turing Award ===
- Judea Pearl

=== Astronauts ===
- Charles Camarda
- Paolo A. Nespoli

=== DARPA directors ===
- Jack Ruina

=== Pulitzer Prize winners ===
- James Truslow Adams, writer who coined the term "American Dream"

=== Business leaders ===
- Alfred Amoroso, chairman of Yahoo!
- Israel Borovich, chairman and CEO of EL AL
- Ursula Burns, chairperson and CEO of Xerox
- Vincent A. Calarco, chairman and CEO of Chemtura
- Hugh John Casey, chairman of New York City Transit Authority
- Fadi Chehadé, CEO of ICANN
- Howard A. Chinn, chief engineer of CBS, pioneered techniques of analog audio recording as well as radio and television broadcasting practices
- Bern Dibner, chairman, CEO and founder of Burndy
- John Dionisio, chairman and CEO of AECOM
- Eugene Fasullo, chief engineer of Port Authority of New York and New Jersey
- Paul Ferri, chairman, CEO and founder of Matrix Partners
- Charles Ranlett Flint, founder of IBM
- Rachelle Friedman, chairperson, CEO and founder of J&R
- Bill Friend, president of Bechtel
- Sunil Godhwani, chairman and CEO of Religare
- Jay Greene, NASA chief engineer
- Herbert L. Henkel, chairman of Ingersoll Rand
- Charles Hinkaty, vice president, Citibank
- Michael Horodniceanu, president of MTA Capital Construction
- Jason Hsuan, chairman and CEO of TPV Technology
- Joseph J. Jacobs, chairman, CEO and founder of Jacobs Engineering Group
- Michael H. Kappaz, chairman and CEO of KM Group
- Eugene Kleiner, chairman, CEO and founder of Kleiner Perkins Caufield & Byers
- Nils Lahr, chairman, CEO and founder of IBEAM Broadcasting Corporation
- Arthur C. Martinez, chairman and CEO of Sears
- Craig G. Matthews, president, CFO and chief operating officer of KeySpan
- John Elmer McKeen, chairman and CEO of Pfizer
- George W. Melville, chief engineer of the U.S. Navy, Congressional Gold Medal winner
- Ami Miron, vice president, General Instrument Corporation
- William C. W. Mow, chairman, CEO and founder of Bugle Boy
- Glenford Myers, chairman, CEO and founder of Radisys
- Stav Prodromou, chairman and CEO of Peregrine Semiconductor
- Mark Ronald, chairman and CEO of BAE Systems
- Virginia P. Ruesterholz, president, Verizon
- Richard Santulli, hairman and CEO of NetJets
- Alan Schriesheim, director and CEO of Argonne National Laboratory, board member of Rohm and Haas
- Alfred P. Sloan (attended, but transferred), chairman, CEO and founder of General Motors
- Robert J. Stevens, chairman and CEO of Lockheed Martin
- Charles D. Strang, chairman, CEO and president of Outboard Marine Corporation
- Jerome Swartz, chairman, CEO and founder of Symbol Technologies
- John Trani, chairman and CEO of Stanley Black & Decker
- Spencer Trask, chairman of The New York Times

=== Inventors ===
- Barouh Berkovits, contributed to invention of the cardiac defibrillator and artificial cardiac pacemaker
- Robert G. Brown, invented the first telephone handset
- Mario Cardullo, contributed to the invention of the Radio-frequency identification (RFID)
- Helias Doundoulakis, patented the suspension system for the largest radio telescope in the world
- Paul Peter Ewald, inventor of X-ray diffraction method for determination of molecular structure
- Torunn Atteraas Garin, oversaw the development of the artificial sweetener aspartame; developed nontoxic processes to create food colorings and remove caffeine from coffee
- Norman Gaylord, played a prominent role in the development of permeable contact lenses
- Erol Gelenbe, invented the random neural network and the G-network
- George Glauberman, discovered the ZJ theorem and the Z* theorem
- Henry C. Goldmark, designed and installed the Panama Canal locks
- Gordon Gould, invented the laser
- Fredric J. Harris, co-inventor of the Blackman–Harris filter
- Jasper H. Kane, invented the practical, deep-tank fermentation method for production of large quantities of pharmaceutical-grade penicillin
- Maurice Karnaugh, inventor of the Karnaugh map (K-map)
- Thomas J. Kelly, designed and built the Apollo Lunar Module
- Joginder Lal, Goodyear polymer research manager; expert in the synthesis and mechanism of the formation of high polymers
- Joe Landolina, invented Vetigel
- Hung-Chang Lin, invented the quasi-complementary (transistor) amplifier circuit, the lateral transistor, and the wireless microphone; held 61 patents
- Joseph Owades, inventor of Lite beer
- Hans Reissner, designed the first successful all-metal aircraft, the Reissner Canard (or Ente) with both skin and structure made of metal; first solved Einstein's equation for the metric of a charged point mass; his closed-form solution, rediscovered by several other physicists within the next few years, is now called the Reissner–Nordström metric
- David J. Thomson, invented the multitaper
- Fred Waller, invented Cinerama, the Waller Gunnery Trainer, and patented the water ski
- James Wood, fabricated the steel cables for the Brooklyn Bridge, making cable-lift elevators possible; contributed to the inventions of lockmaking, submarine, A/C generator, electric motors, transformer and the design of the modern refrigerator; held 240 patents
- Ronald R. Yager, invented ordered weighted averaging aggregation operator

== See also ==
- List of university and college mergers in the United States
- Gee Bee Model R
- NYU Tandon School of Engineering Lynford Lecture Series
