= List of New York University alumni =

This list of New York University alumni includes notable graduates and non-graduate former students of New York University.

== Legend ==
The following abbreviations and notes are used to represent NYU schools and colleges:

Abbr.	Meaning
*	Did not graduate
CAS	College of Arts and Science
DENT	College of Dentistry
NURSING	Rory Meyers College of Nursing
GAL	Gallatin School of Individualized Study
GSAS	Graduate School of Arts and Science
IFA	Institute of Fine Arts
SPS	School of Professional Studies
ENG	School of Engineering (discontinued/merged; now Tandon)
LAW	School of Law
MED	School of Medicine
POLY	Tandon School of Engineering
SSW	New York University Silver School of Social Work
STEINHARDT	Steinhardt School of Culture, Education, and Human Development
STERN	Stern School of Business
TSOA	Tisch School of the Arts
ARTS	University College of Arts and Sciences (discontinued/merged; now CAS)
WAG	Robert F. Wagner Graduate School of Public Service
SHA	New York University Shanghai
WSC	Washington Square College (discontinued/merged; now CAS)

In 1973, the New York University School of Engineering and Science merged into Polytechnic Institute of Brooklyn, which in turn merged into NYU to form New York University Polytechnic School of Engineering in 2014. In 2015, the school changed its name to NYU Tandon School of Engineering.

== Academia and research ==
=== Educators ===
Name	Year	School	Degree	Notability	Reference
John S. Allen	1936	GSAS	Ph.D.	First president of University of South Florida in Tampa; interim president of University of Florida in Gainesville	
Charles E. Anderson		POLY		Dean of University of Wisconsin, Madison	
Miriam Basilio	2002	IFA	Ph.D.	Educator, author and curator at Museum of Modern Art, NY	
Jack Baskin		ENG		Founder of Jack Baskin School of Engineering at University of California, Santa Cruz	
Samuel Baskin	1974	GSAS	Ph.D.	First president of Union Institute & University in Cincinnati	
Eleanor K. Baum		POLY		Cooper Union Engineering School dean; served as dean of Pratt Institute; first female dean of an engineering school in United States	
Haim Ben-Shahar				Israeli economist and president of Tel Aviv University	
Arthur Bienenstock		POLY		Vice provost and dean of research at Stanford University; former director of Stanford Synchrotron Radiation Lightsource	
Edward J. Bloustein	1948	WSC	B.A.	Seventeenth president of Rutgers University; professor at NYU Law	
Bruno A. Boley		POLY		Dean of Engineering at Northwestern University; National Academy of Engineering member	
William Boylan			Master of Pedagogy	First president of Brooklyn College	
Joyce F. Brown	1971, 1980	GSAS	M.S., Ph.D.	President of Fashion Institute of Technology	
Truesdel Peck Calkins				Founder and first president of Hofstra University	
Herbert Carlin		POLY		Director of School of Electrical and Computer Engineering at Cornell University; professor at Massachusetts Institute of Technology and École Normale Supérieure, Paris	
Rustica Carpio	1956	STEINHARDT	M.A.	Chairperson and first dean of College of Communication of Polytechnic University of the Philippines; dean of College of Mass Communication at Pamantasan ng Lungsod ng Maynila; Fulbright Scholar	
K. Mani Chandy		POLY		Chair of engineering and applied sciences at California Institute of Technology; National Academy of Engineering member	
Serena Chen	1997		Ph.D	Chair of Psychology Department at U.C. Berkeley	
Frank A. Cipriani		GSAS	M.A., Ph.D.	Fifth president of SUNY Farmingdale	
Kenneth Connor		POLY		Electrical, Computer, and Systems Engineering Department head 2001–2008 at Rensselaer Polytechnic Institute; IEEE Fellow	
William Everdell	1971	NYU	Ph.D.	Dean of Humanities, Saint Ann's School, author of The First Moderns	
Edgar Fiedler				Economist	
Jessica Garretson Finch		Law	J.D.	Founding president of Finch College	
Jeffrey P. Freidberg	1961, 1962, 1964	POLY	B.S., M.S., Ph.D.	Professor emeritus and former head of Nuclear Science and Engineering Department at MIT (1997–2003); former associate director of MIT Plasma Science and Fusion Center	
John Anderson Fry	1986	Stern	M.B.A.	President, Drexel University	
Elmer L. Gaden		POLY		Former chair of Department of Chemical Engineering and Applied Chemistry at Columbia University; Russ Prize winner; National Academy of Engineering member	
Michael J. Garanzini	1978	STEINHARDT	M.A.	President and chancellor, Loyola University Chicago	
Jerome Gavis		POLY		Chairman of chemical engineering department at Johns Hopkins University; National Academy of Science member; helped develop methods of separating solid waste components	
Alfred Gessow		ENG		Chair of Department of Aerospace Engineering and professor at University of Maryland, College Park; professor at University of Virginia; awarded NASA Exceptional Service Medal	
Dorit Geva	2006		Ph.D.	Founding dean of undergraduate studies at Central European University	
Harold S. Goldberg		POLY		Dean of Tufts University School of Engineering; Gordon Prize winner; National Academy of Engineering member	
Urban Gonnoud	1958	Stern	M.B.A.	15th president of St. Francis College	
Joe Gow				Chancellor of University of Wisconsin–La Crosse	
Martin H. Graham	1952	POLY	Ph.D.	Chair of Computer Science Department at University of California, Berkeley; professor at Rice University; designer of Rice Institute Computer; secretary of Academic Senate, University of California 1978–1980	
Martha Greenblatt		POLY		Chair of Chemistry Department at Rutgers University	
Charles Waldo Haskins		POLY		Founder and first dean of New York University Stern School of Business	
Gabriel Hawawini	1977	GSAS	Ph.D.	Dean, INSEAD, 2000–2006	
Russell K. Hotzler		POLY		President of New York City College of Technology	
Michael Hudson				Economics professor	
Richard Joel	1972, 1975	Law	B.A., J.D.	Fourth president of Yeshiva University, 2003–2017	
Peter G. Jordan		POLY		Vice chancellor of CUNY; president of Tarrant County College; dean of New York Institute of Technology; dean of Adelphi University; overseer of Colby College	
Francis Kilcoyne				President of Brooklyn College	
Kim Won-yong	1959		Ph.D.	"Father of Korean archaeology", professor at Seoul National University	
John Sterling Kingsley		POLY		Chair of Biology at Tufts University	
William B. Kouwenhoven		POLY		Inventor of closed-chest cardiac defibrillator; recipient of Edison Medal; professor at Johns Hopkins University	
Jerome Krase	1973	SOC	Ph.D.	Professor emeritus and archivist at Brooklyn College	
Paul Kurtz	1948	WSC	B.A.	"Pope of the unbelievers"	
Norman Lamm		POLY		President and chancellor of Yeshiva University	
Eugene M. Lang		POLY		Chair emeritus of the board of Swarthmore College	
Howard Lesnick				Jefferson B. Fordham Professor of Law, University of Pennsylvania Law School	
Yehuda (Leo) Levi		POLY		Rector at the Jerusalem College of Technology	
Samuel Levy		Law	B.A., J.D.	Chairman of the Yeshiva University board of trustees	
Katharine Culbert Lyall	1969	Stern	M.B.A.	President, University of Wisconsin–Madison; president of the University of Wisconsin System	
Gerald W. Lynch				President of John Jay College	
Amy Malek	2005		M.A.	Assistant professor, scholar, and sociocultural anthropologist; endowed chair and director in Iranian and Persian Gulf Studies (IPGS) at Oklahoma State University, Stillwater	
Newt Margulies		POLY		Dean and professor of Management in College of Business Administration at California State University, San Marcos; former dean of School of Business, University of California, Irvine	
James Milliken	1983	Law	J.D.	President of the University of Nebraska; chancellor of City University of New York	
Cathy Minehan		STERN	MBA	Dean of School of Management at Simmons College	
Donald Moon	1958	ENG	M.S.	President of Shimer College	
A. Michael Noll		POLY		Dean of University of Southern California	
Leonard Peikoff	1964	GSAS	Ph.D.	Intellectual heir of Ayn Rand; leading figure of Objectivism	
Fortunato de la Peña		POLY		Chairman of Department of Industrial Engineering and Operations Research at University of the Philippines College of Engineering	
Shirley D. Peterson		Law	J.D.	President of Hood College; on board of trustees of Bryn Mawr College 1994–2007; trustee emerita of Bryn Mawr College	
Nicanor Reyes Sr.	1917	Stern	B.A.	Founder and first president of Far Eastern University in Manila, Philippines	
Fazlollah Reza		POLY		Head of Sharif University of Technology and University of Tehran; professor at Massachusetts Institute of Technology and McGill University; fellow of the IEEE	
Virginia P. Ruesterholz		POLY		Chairman of board of trustees of Stevens Institute of Technology	
Wallace S. Sayre		GSAS	Ph.D.	Professor of Columbia University; namesake of Sayre's law	
John P. Schaefer		POLY		President of University of Arizona	
Alexander Schure		ENG		President of New York Institute of Technology	
W. J. Seeley		POLY		Dean of Duke University's Edmund T. Pratt Jr. School of Engineering; served as chairman of Electrical Engineering Department at Duke University; professor at University of Pennsylvania; director of Naval Ordnance Laboratory	
Josef Singer		POLY		President of Technion – Israel Institute of Technology	
Lawrence G. Smith			M.D.	Founding dean of Hofstra Northwell School of Medicine	
Richard E. Sorensen		POLY		Dean of Pamplin College of Business at Virginia Tech	
Richard S. Stein		POLY		Founder and professor of Polymer Science and Engineering Department at University of Massachusetts Amherst; member of National Academy of Sciences and National Academy of Engineering; Fulbright Visiting Professor at Kyoto University; National Research Council Fellow at Cambridge University; research associate at Princeton University	
Marian Stoltz-Loike	1984	GSAS	Ph.D.	Dean of Lander College for Women and vice president of Touro College	
Paul Tagliabue		Law	J.D.	Chairman of board of directors of Georgetown University	
Jeremy Travis		Law	J.D.	President of John Jay College of Criminal Justice	
Hermann Viets		POLY		President of Milwaukee School of Engineering	
Iris Weinshall		WAG		Vice chancellor at City University of New York	
Herbert George Welch		POLY		President of Ohio Wesleyan University	
Samuel Merrill Woodbridge	1838		B.A.	Led New Brunswick seminary as dean and president of the faculty 1883–1901	
Howard Zinn	1951	CAS	B.A.	Author of A People's History of the United States	

=== Professors, researchers and scientists ===
Name	Year	School	Degree	Notability	Reference
Gerard A. Alphonse		POLY		2005 president of Institute of Electrical and Electronics Engineers (IEEE)	
Geetha Angara	1984	GSAS	Ph.D.	Victim of unsolved 2005 homicide at New Jersey water treatment plant	
Boris Aronov	1986, 1989	Courant	M.S., Ph.D.	Computer scientist; professor at New York University Tandon School of Engineering; Sloan Research Fellow	
Sylvan Barnet	1948	CAS	B.A.	Shakespearean scholar	
Jules Bellisio		POLY		Chief scientist at Telcordia Technologies	
Ernest Bernbaum		POLY		Professor at Harvard University	
Tito Boeri	1990		Ph.D.	Professor at Bocconi University, Milan; director of Fondazione RDB	
Charles Camarda		POLY		Astronaut; NASA scientist and mission specialist on the Return to Flight voyage of shuttle Discovery	
Hugh John Casey		POLY		Designer of the Pentagon	
Hamilton Castner		POLY		Industrial chemist; invented methods to produce sodium metal and sodium hydroxide from soda ash and salt respectively; awarded Elliott Cresson Medal	
Howard A. Chinn		POLY		Pioneered techniques of analog audio recording, and radio and television broadcasting; chief audio engineer at CBS; researcher at MIT and Harvard	
Bern Dibner		POLY		Discovered how to connect electrical conductors still used today; assembled one of the world's most important history of science libraries, now housed at MIT and National Museum of American History	
Daniel Draper	1880	Med	Ph.D	Meteorologist and medical doctor	
E. Lloyd Du Brul	1937	DENT	D.D.S.	Author of Sicher and Du Brul's Oral Anatomy	
Avery Fisher	1929	ARTS	B.S.	Inventor of first stereo radio-phonograph	
Bill Friend		POLY		Chairman of University of California's President's Council on the National Laboratories; National Academy of Engineering member	
Neil Garg	2000	CAS	B.S.	UCLA professor & Kenneth N. Trueblood Endowed Chair	
Torunn Atteraas Garin		POLY		Oversaw development of artificial sweetener aspartame and was a national spokesperson for it; developed nontoxic processes to create food colorings and remove caffeine from coffee	
Caroline D. Gentile	1949		M.A.	Associate professor emeritus of education; physical education instructor; longest-serving faculty member of University of Maine at Presque Isle	
George Glauberman		POLY		Professor at University of Chicago; fellow of American Mathematical Society; proved ZJ theorem and Z* theorem	
Jay Greene		POLY		Chief engineer of NASA Johnson Space Center	
Peter Hänggi		POLY		Theoretical physicist best known for his original works on Brownian motion and ratchets, stochastic resonance and dissipative systems (classical and quantum)	
Corwin Hansch		GSAS	Ph.D.	Inventor of Hansch equation	
Fredric J. Harris		POLY		Co-inventor of Blackman-Harris Filter	
Martin Hellman	1966	ENG	B.S.	Invented public key cryptography; inducted into National Inventors Hall of Fame; Turing Award winner	
Frances Hugle		POLY		Microscopic and integrated circuitry pioneer; inventor of tape-automated bonding	
Alexander Johnston		POLY		Professor at Princeton University	
Jay Kappraff		POLY		Professor at Cooper Union; NASA aerospace engineer	
Ephraim Katzir		POLY		Fourth president of Israel; chief scientist of Israel Defense Department	
John Harvey Kellogg	1875	Med		Co-inventor of Kellogg's cereals	
Thomas J. Kelly		POLY		Scientist; "father" of Apollo Lunar Module	
Barbara Keyfitz	1970	Courant	Ph.D.	Director of Fields Institute	
David Korn	1969	Courant	Ph.D.	Creator of Korn shell	
Irwin Kra		POLY		Professor at Massachusetts Institute of Technology	
Leonard Linkow	1952	DENT	DDS	Pioneer in oral implantology; nominated for Nobel Prize in Medicine in 1969	
Erwin Lutwak		POLY		Mathematician, inaugural fellow of American Mathematical Society	
Albert Macovski		POLY		Professor (emeritus) at Stanford University; National Academy of Engineering member	
Ines Mandl		POLY		Professor at Columbia University; American Academy of Arts and Sciences member; awarded Garvan-Olin Medal in 1983 for her work on the enzyme collagenase	
Christos V. Massalas		POLY		Professor at Trinity College, Dublin; Fulbright scholar	
George W. Melville		POLY		Engineer-in-chief of United States Navy; Congressional Gold Medal winner	
Donald J. Metz		POLY		Nuclear engineer at Brookhaven National Laboratory	
Mostafa Minawi	2011	GSAS	Ph.D.	Professor of History, Cornell University	
Ami Miron		POLY		Received two Technology and Engineering Emmy Awards	
Lee Morin	1978–1982	Med	M.Sc., M.D., Ph.D.	Astronaut	
Paolo A. Nespoli		POLY		Italian astronaut, mission specialist at STS-120 Space Shuttle mission	
Robert O'Handley		POLY	MS, PhD	MIT professor and research scientist	
Judea Pearl		POLY		Professor at UCLA; awarded Turing Award in 2011; member of National Academy of Engineering and National Academy of Sciences	
Peter Pershan		POLY		Professor at Harvard University	
Robert Qiu	1955		Ph.D.	CEO of Wiscom Technologies; professor of electrical engineering at Shanghai Jiao Tong University	
Buddy Ratner		POLY		Professor at University of Washington; National Academy of Engineering member	
John Wellborn Root	1969	ARTS	B.S.	Inventor of floating raft system	
Samuel Ruben		POLY		Inventor who made lasting contributions to electrochemistry and solid-state technology, including founding of Duracell; held more than 300 patents	
Jack Ruina		POLY		DARPA director; MIT professor emeritus	
Alan Schriesheim		POLY		Director emeritus and retired CEO of Argonne National Laboratory; professor at University of Chicago; National Academy of Engineering member	
Mischa Schwartz		POLY		Professor at Columbia University; National Academy of Engineering member	
Gerald Soffen			Postdoc	Chief scientist of Viking missions to Mars in 1976	
Salvatore Stolfo	1979	Courant	Ph.D.	Professor at Columbia University	
Charles D. Strang		POLY		Professor at Massachusetts Institute of Technology	
Michael Strano	1997	POLY	B.S.	Carbon P. Dubbs Professor of Chemical Engineering at Massachusetts Institute of Technology	
David J. Thomson		POLY		Professor at Princeton University, Stanford University, MIT, and University of Cambridge; invented multitaper	
Dennis Tito	1962	CAS	B.A.	First commercial space flight customer	
Lew Tucker		POLY		Vice president and chief technology officer of Cisco Systems	
Alfred Vail	1836		B.A.	Inventor	
Pat Villani		POLY		Author of DOS-C, FreeDOS kernel	
Barbara Wertheimer	1960		M.A	Co-founder and director, Cornell University School of Industrial and Labor Relations	
Robert M. White	1951	ENG	B.S.	Air Force test pilot	
James Wood		POLY		Fabricated the steel cables for Brooklyn Bridge, making cable-lift elevators possible; contributed to inventions of lockmaking, submarine, design of modern refrigerator, A/C generator, electric motors, and transformer; held 240 patents	
Ronald R. Yager		POLY		Professor at University of California, Berkeley; invented ordered weighted averaging aggregation operator	
Minoru Yamasaki	1951	GSAS	M.A.	Works include World Trade Center	
Ben Zinn	1961	ENG	B.S.	International soccer player and academic at Georgia Institute of Technology; member of National Academy of Engineering	
Norman Gaylord		POLY		Played prominent role in development of permeable contact lenses	
Erol Gelenbe		POLY		Professor at Imperial College London and Duke University; invented G-networks and random neural network	
Steven L. Goldman		POLY		Professor at Lehigh University	
Ronald Silverman		POLY		Professor of Ophthalmology at Weill Cornell Medical College; professor of Ophthalmic Science at Columbia University Medical Center	
Don Torrieri		POLY		Professor at Johns Hopkins University; research engineer and fellow of US Army Research Laboratory	
Edward A. Frieman		POLY		Professor at Princeton University; director of Scripps Institution of Oceanography; Guggenheim Fellow	
Grigori Perelman		COURANT		Fields Medal winner; proved soul conjecture and Thurston's geometrization conjecture	
Leopold B. Felsen		POLY		Professor at Boston University; National Academy of Engineering member; Guggenheim Fellow	
Erich E. Kunhardt		POLY		Professor at Stevens Institute of Technology	
Bishnu S. Atal		POLY		Professor at University of Washington; member of National Academy of Engineering and National Academy of Sciences	
Robert H. Lieberman		POLY		Professor at Cornell University; Fulbright scholar	
Hugh Seidman		POLY		Professor at University of Wisconsin, Yale University, Columbia University, College of William and Mary, and New School	
Clayton Hamilton		POLY		Professor at Columbia University	
Linda Weiser Friedman		POLY		Professor of Statistics and Computer Information Systems at Baruch College and CUNY Graduate Center	
George Preti		POLY		Professor at University of Pennsylvania School of Medicine	
Gerald J. Popek		ENG		Professor at UCLA	
Hung-Chang Lin		POLY		Professor of Electrical Engineering at University of Maryland; invented quasi-complementary (transistor) amplifier circuit, lateral transistor, and wireless microphone; held 61 patents	
Murray S. Klamkin		POLY		Professor at University of Minnesota and SUNY Buffalo	
Anthony M. Johnson		POLY		Professor at University of Maryland	
Steve Wallach		POLY		Professor at Rice University; holds 33 patents; member of National Academy of Engineering	
Peter Staecker		POLY		President of Institute of Electrical and Electronics Engineers; researcher at MIT Lincoln Laboratory	
Andrew Herrmann		POLY		President of American Society of Civil Engineers	
Joel B. Snyder		POLY		President of Institute of Electrical and Electronics Engineers	
Eli M. Pearce		POLY		President of American Chemical Society; designed fire-resistant polymers	
Morris Janowitz		WSC		Made major contributions to sociological theory	
Martin Pope		POLY		Professor emeritus at New York University	
Walter Brenner		POLY		Professor at New York University	
Bancroft Gherardi Jr.		POLY		IEEE Edison Medal winner; president of American Institute of Electrical Engineers; National Academy of Sciences member	
Mario Cardullo		POLY		Invented Radio-frequency identification (RFID)	
Robert G. Brown		POLY		Invented first telephone handset	
Joseph Owades		POLY		Inventor of Lite beer	
Len Shustek		POLY		Professor at Carnegie-Mellon University and Stanford University	
Eugene Fasullo		POLY		Chief engineer of Port Authority of New York and New Jersey	
Martin Schechter		POLY		Professor and founding director of School of Population and Public Health in Faculty of Medicine at University of British Columbia	
Rossiter W. Raymond		POLY		Professor at Columbia University	
Henry L. Bachman	1951, 1954	POLY	BSEE, MSEE	IEEE president in 1987; served as vice president of BAE Systems; fellow of IEEE	
John Gilbert		POLY		Inventor of non-stick coating as an application of Teflon; invented devices ranging from a multiple-head pasta extruder for the Ronzoni Company to miniaturized registers for U.S. Army Signal Corps; chief scientist at DuPont	
Henry C. Goldmark		POLY		Designed and installed Panama Canal locks	
Mario Tchou		POLY		Created Olivetti Elea, Italy's first computer	
Leopold Just		POLY		Designed virtually every major bridge and tunnel in New York City, as well as Washington Metro, Ohio Turnpike and Connecticut Turnpike	
Jasper H. Kane		POLY		Developed practical, deep-tank fermentation method for production of large quantities of pharmaceutical-grade penicillin	
Nathan Marcuvitz		POLY		Head of experimental group of Radiation Laboratory (MIT); member of National Academy of Engineering	
Jacob Bekenstein		POLY		Wolf Prize in Physics winner; best known for his part in discovery of what is now called Bekenstein-Hawking radiation	
Jerome H. Lemelson		ENG		Holder of 605 patents; established Lemelson Foundation; one of the most prolific inventors in American history; several of his inventions and works in the fields in which he patented have made possible, either wholly or in part, innovations like automated warehouses, industrial robots, cordless telephones, fax machines, videocassette recorders, camcorders, and the magnetic tape drive used in tape players	
Ali Akansu	1983, 1987	POLY	M.S., Ph.D.	Professor at New Jersey Institute of Technology known for contributions to subband and wavelet transforms	
Jack M. Sipress		POLY		Contributed to development of submarine communications facilities; member of National Academy of Engineering	
Benjamin Adler		POLY		Helped develop commercial television	
Robert Zwanzig		POLY		Professor at Johns Hopkins University; Fellow of National Academy of Sciences	
Barouh Berkovits		POLY		Invented cardiac defibrillator and artificial cardiac pacemaker	
John B. MacChesney		ENG		Winner of Charles Stark Draper Prize	
Gerard J. Foschini		ENG		Professor at Princeton University	
Lawrence J. Fogel		ENG		Inventor of active noise cancellation	
Leonard Greene		ENG		Inducted into National Inventors Hall of Fame	
Alexander H. Flax		ENG		Chief Scientist of the U.S. Air Force (1959–1961)	
Robert S. Swarz		ENG		Co-director of Systems Engineering Practice Office of MITRE Corporation	
George Doundoulakis		POLY		Designed what was until very recently the largest radio telescope in the world	
Helias Doundoulakis		POLY		Patented suspension system for the largest radio telescope in the world	
Ahmed Cemal Eringen		POLY		Turkish-American engineering scientist; professor at Princeton University; namesake of Eringen Medal	
Henrik Ager-Hanssen		ENG		Norwegian nuclear physicist and businessperson; member of National Academy of Engineering	
Bede Liu	1956, 1960	POLY	M.E.E., D.E.E.	Pioneer in digital signal processing; professor at Princeton University; member of National Academy of Engineering; Life Fellow of IEEE	
Subrata K. Sen		POLY		Joseph F. Cullman III professor and researcher at Yale University	
Roy LoPresti		ENG		Worked on Apollo Moon Program; served as advisor to US Congress; designed LoPresti Fury; designed Grumman American AA-5; chief engineer and vice president of Engineering at Mooney Aviation Company, where he designed the Mooney 201	
Robert Sobel				Professor of history at Hofstra University; prolific writer of business histories	
Elliott Skinner				Anthropologist; Guggenheim Fellow	
James Ax		POLY		Mathematics professor at Stanford University and Cornell University; won Frank Nelson Cole Prize in Number Theory; proved Ax–Grothendieck theorem and Ax–Kochen theorem; Guggenheim Fellow	
Russell A. Kirsch		ENG		Developed first digital image scanner	
E. Gail de Planque	1983	GSAS	Ph.D.	Nuclear physicist; first female commissioner at US government's Nuclear Regulatory Commission; National Academy of Engineering member	
Jacob Wolfowitz	1942	Courant	Ph.D.	Statistician and Shannon Award-winning information theorist; professor at Cornell University, Columbia University and University of Illinois at Urbana-Champaign; proved Wald–Wolfowitz runs test and Dvoretzky–Kiefer–Wolfowitz inequality	
Solomon Berson	1939, 1945	MED	M.S., MD	Developed radioimmunoassay with Rosalyn Yalow, received a Nobel Prize for their joint work after Berson's death	
Gabriel P. Weisberg	1963	WSC	B.A.	Art historian, professor of Art History emeritus, University of Minnesota	
Michael I. Yarymovych		ENG		Chief scientist of the U.S. Air Force (1973–1975); Guggenheim Fellow	

==== Abel Prize recipients ====
Name	Year	School	Degree	Notability	Reference
Peter Lax	1947, 1949	Courant	B.A., Ph.D.	Abel Prize (2005) and 1986 National Medal of Science recipient	
Louis Nirenberg	1949	Courant	Ph.D.	Abel Prize (2015) and 1995 National Medal of Science recipient	
S. R. Srinivasa Varadhan	1966	Courant	postdoc	Abel Prize (2007)	

==== MacArthur Fellows ====
Name	Year	School	Degree	Notability	Reference
Milton Babbitt	1935	ARTS	B.A.	1986 MacArthur Fellow	
George Perle	1956	GSAS	Ph.D.	1974 MacArthur Fellow	
Charles Simic	1966	ARTS	B.A.	1983 MacArthur Fellow	
Michelle Dorrance	2001	Gallatin	B.A.	2015 MacArthur Fellow	
Mimi Lien	2003	TSOA	M.F.A.	2015 MacArthur Fellow	
Basil Twist	2015	TSOA		2015 MacArthur Fellow	
Majora Carter	1997	TSOA	M.F.A	2005 MacArthur Fellow	
Branden Jacobs-Jenkins	2007	TSOA	M.A.	2016 MacArthur Fellow	
Sylvia A. Law	1968	Law	J.D.	1983 MacArthur Fellow	
Annie Baker	2003	TSOA	B.F.A.	2017 MacArthur Fellow	
Gabriel Victora	2011	GSAS	Ph.D.	2017 MacArthur Fellow	

==== National Medals for Science, Technology and Innovation, Arts and Humanities recipients ====
Name	Year	School	Degree	Notability	Reference
Joseph B. Keller	1943–1948	GSAS	B.A., M.A., Ph.D.	1988 National Medal of Science recipient	
Peter Lax	1947, 1949	Courant	B.A., Ph.D.	1986 National Medal of Science recipient and Abel Prize (2005)	
Alexandre Chorin		Courant		2014 National Medal of Science recipient	
Martin David Kruskal		Courant		1993 National Medal of Science recipient	
Cathleen Synge Morawetz	1951	GSAS	Ph.D.	1998 National Medal of Science recipient (first female recipient)	
Frederick Reines	1944	GSAS	Ph.D.	1985 National Medal of Science recipient and 1995 Nobel Prize in Physics	
Albert Sabin	1931	Med	M.D.	1988 National Medal of Science recipient	
John Archibald Wheeler	1934	GSAS	postdoc	1970 National Medal of Science recipient	
John G. Trump	1929	POLY	B.S.	1983 National Medal of Science recipient	
Joel S. Engel	1964	POLY	Ph.D.	1994 National Medal of Technology recipient	
Richard J. Gambino	1976	POLY	M.S.	1995 National Medal of Technology recipient	
Jerome Swartz		POLY	Ph.D.	1999 National Medal of Technology recipient	
Tony Kushner	1984	TSOA	MFA	2012 National Medal of Arts recipient	
Moisés Kaufman	1989	TSOA	BFA	2016 National Medal of Arts recipient; Guggenheim Fellow	
Louis Nirenberg	1949	Courant	Ph.D.	1995 National Medal of Science recipient and Abel Prize (2015)	
S. R. Srinivasa Varadhan	1966	Courant	postdoc	2010 National Medal of Science recipient	
B. Gerald Cantor		Law		1995 National Medal of Arts recipient	
Bernard Brodie	1935	GSAS	Ph.D.	1968 National Medal of Science recipient	

==== Nobel laureates ====
Name	Year	School	Degree	Notability	Reference
Robert Aumann				2005 Nobel Memorial Prize in Economics	
Julius Axelrod	1941	Med	M.Sc.	1970 Nobel Prize in Physiology or Medicine	
Saul Bellow				1976 Nobel Prize in Literature	
Baruj Benacerraf				1980 Nobel Prize in Physiology or Medicine	
Joseph Brodsky				1987 Nobel Prize in Literature	
Francis Crick	1953	POLY	Postdoc	1962 Nobel Prize for Physiology or Medicine	
Mohamed ElBaradei	1967	Law	LL.M.	2005 Nobel Peace Prize	
Gertrude B. Elion		*POLY	PhD	1988 Nobel Prize in Physiology or Medicine	
Robert Engle				2003 Nobel Memorial Prize in Economic Sciences	
Rudolf Eucken				1908 Nobel Prize for Literature	
Friedrich Hayek	1924	GSAS		1974 Bank of Sweden Prize in Economics	
James Heckman				2000 Nobel Memorial Prize in Economic Sciences	
Avram Hershko				2004 Nobel Prize in Chemistry	
Eric R. Kandel	1955	Med	M.D.	2000 Nobel Prize in Physiology or Medicine; Associate Professor 1965–74	
Tjalling Koopmans				1975 Nobel Memorial Prize in Economic Sciences	
Arthur Kornberg	1947	Med		1959 Nobel Prize in Physiology or Medicine	
Wassily Leontief				1973 Nobel Memorial Prize in Economic Sciences	
Otto Loewi				1936 Nobel Prize in Physiology or Medicine	
Rudolph Marcus		POLY		1992 Nobel Prize in Chemistry; won Wolf Prize in Chemistry	
Robert Mulliken				1966 Nobel Prize in Chemistry	
Gunnar Myrdal				1974 Nobel Memorial Prize in Economic Sciences	
Severo Ochoa				1959 Nobel Prize in Physiology and Medicine	
George E. Palade			Postgraduate work at biology laboratory of Robert Chambers	1974 Nobel Prize in Physiology or Medicine	
Shimon Peres				Nobel Peace Prize	
Martin Perl	1948	POLY	B.S.	1995 Nobel Prize in Physics	
Edward Prescott				2004 Nobel Prize in Economics	
Frederick Reines	1944	GSAS	Ph.D.	1995 Nobel Prize in Physics and 1985 National Medal of Science recipient	
Elihu Root	1867	Law	LL.B.	1912 Nobel Peace Prize	
Irwin Rose			Postgraduate work under Severo Ochoa	2004 Nobel Prize in Chemistry	
Thomas Sargent				2011 Nobel Memorial Prize in Economic Sciences	
Clifford Shull	1941	GSAS	Ph.D.	1994 Nobel Prize in Physics	
Wole Soyinka				1986 Nobel Prize in Literature	
George Wald	1927	WSC	B.S.	1967 Nobel Prize in Physiology or Medicine	
Rosalyn Yalow			coursework*	1977 Nobel Prize in Physiology or Medicine	

== Business ==
Name	Relation to NYU	Notability	Reference
Kobi Alexander	Stern, M.B.A., 1980	Founder and former CEO of Comverse Technology	
Leslie Alexander	CAS B.A.	Attorney and businessman; former owner of Houston Rockets NBA team	
Nicolas Berggruen	Stern, B.S., 1981	Billionaire, founder of Berggruen Institute	
Alexander Soros	CAS B.A.	Non-profit executive, heir and philanthropist; son of George Soros	
Philip Jaffe	POLY, 1913–14	Co-founder of Amerasia; involved in 1945 Amerasia espionage affair	
Ursula Burns	POLY, B.S., 1980	Chairman and CEO of Xerox	
Charles Ranlett Flint	POLY, B.S., 1868	Founder of IBM	
Harvey R. Blau	A.B.; LLM	Chairman and former CEO of Griffon Corporation	
Ronald Kramer	Stern, MBA	CEO of Griffon Corporation; former president and director of Wynn Resorts	
Alex Klokus	Stern	Co-founder of Futurism, executive producer	
James B. Rosenwald	Stern, MBA	Co-founder and managing partner of Dalton Investments LLC	
James M. Henderson	Graduate studies	Founder of Henderson Advertising Agency in Greenville, South Carolina; Republican candidate for lieutenant governor of South Carolina in 1970	
Arthur C. Martinez	POLY, B.S., 1960	Former chairman and CEO of Sears	
Robert J. Stevens	POLY, M.S., 1985	Chairman, president and CEO of Lockheed Martin	
Thor Bjorgolfsson	Stern, B.S., 1991	Icelandic businessman and entrepreneur; known as "Iceland's first billionaire"	
David Boies	Law L.L.M., 1967	Founder and chairman, Boies, Schiller & Flexner	
Jake Burton Carpenter	Economics degree 1977 WSUC	Designer of modern snowboard and founder of Burton Snowboards	
Ben Cohen	Art Therapy *	Founder of Ben & Jerry's	
Robert B. Cohen	1947	Founded Hudson News in 1987	
Jane Gordon	CAS B.A.	Jewelry designer	
John J. Creedon	Stern 1955, B.S. Law 1957, J.D.	Former CEO and chairman, MetLife	
Marvin Davis	ENG, B.S.	CEO of Paramount Pictures	
Robert Dow	ENG	Managing partner and chairman of the board of Lord Abbett	
Thomas E. Dooley	Stern, M.B.A. 1984	Senior executive vice president, chief administrative officer, CEO and CFO of Viacom	
Israel Englander	Stern, B.S. 1972	Hedge fund manager	
James Ferragamo	Stern	Businessman	
Richard S. Fuld	Stern 1973, M.B.A.	CEO of Lehman Brothers Holdings Inc.	
Tom Freston	Stern, M.B.A.	MTV Networks	
Abraham George	Stern, 1973, 1975, M.B.A, Ph.D.	Founder of George Foundation and Multinational Computer Models	
Kayalakakam M. George	Stern 1948, M.B.A	CEO of Palai Central Bank (1956–60)	
Harvey Golub	Stern 1961, B.S.	Chairman and CEO of American Express (1994–2001); chairman of American International Group (AIG)	
Alan Greenspan	Stern 1948 1950 1977, B.A., M.A., Ph.D.	Former chairman of Federal Reserve	
Robert Greifeld	Stern 1977, M.B.A.	CEO of NASDAQ	
Scott Harrison	CAS 1998, B.A.	Founder of Charity: Water	
Carl Icahn	MED*	Investor and activist shareholder	
Henry Kaufman	Stern 1948, B.A., Stern 1958, Ph.D.	Wall Street financial consultant	
Paul Kangas	Stern, M.B.A.	Host of Nightly Business Report	
Herb Kelleher	Law 1955, LL.B.	Founder and CEO of Southwest Airlines	
Eugene Kleiner	POLY	Founder of Kleiner Perkins Caufield & Byers; co-founder of Fairchild Semiconductor	
Nina Freeman	POLY	Video game designer, co-founder of Code Liberation Foundation	
Alan Levin	Stern 1976, M.B.A.	CFO of Pfizer	
Paul Levitz	Stern*	President of DC Comics	
Martin Lipton	Law 1955, J.D.	Co-founder of Wachtell, Lipton, Rosen & Katz	
Cortney Lollar	Law 2002, J.D.	Distinguished professor of law at University of Kentucky	
John C. Malone	ENG, M.S.	CEO of Tele-Communications Inc.; CEO of Liberty Media; now chairman of Liberty Media, Liberty Global, and Liberty Interactive, all of which he is majority owner; owns 49% of Starz Inc. and 29% of Discovery Communications	
Michael I. Yarymovych	ENG	Vice president of Boeing Company	
George Feldstein	ENG, B.S., M.S.	Founder of Crestron Electronics	
Cathy Minehan	Stern 1977, M.B.A.	President of Federal Reserve Bank, Boston	
Joseph Nacchio	ENG, B.S., Stern, M.B.A.	Chairman and CEO of Qwest	
Roy Neuberger	coursework*	Founder of Neuberger & Berman	
Marc Rich	CAS, B.A.	Commodities trader and hedge fund manager; indicted for tax evasion	
Leonard Riggio	Stern 1964, M.B.A.	CEO and owner of Barnes & Noble	
Edouard de Rothschild	Stern 1985, M.B.A.	Rothschild Banque	
Jay Schulberg	1961	Advertising executive at Ogilvy & Mather and Bozell Worldwide; creator of "Got Milk?" advertising campaign	
W. R. Berkley	Stern	Founder, chairman and CEO of W. R. Berkley Corporation	
William T. Schwendler	ENG, B.S., 1924	Co-founder, chairman and CEO of Grumman	
Michael Birck	ENG	Co-founder and current chairman of Tellabs	
John Catsimatidis	ENG	Businessman invested in real estate, aviation, and groceries; radio talk show host; owner, president, chairman, and CEO of Gristedes	
Frederick Gluck	ENG	Chief executive at McKinsey & Company; director at Amgen; serves on Harvard Business School Board of Directors of the Associates, Management Education Council of Wharton School, U.S. and Hong Kong Economic Cooperation Committee, Council on Foreign Relations, and board of International Executive Service Corps	
Walter V. Shipley	Stern 1956, B.S.	Chairman and CEO of Chase Manhattan Bank	
Larry Silverstein	CAS B.A., 1952	Owner of World Trade Center site	
Mark Spitznagel	Courant, M.S.	Investor, hedge fund manager	
Stanley Stahl	B.A.	Real estate investor	
Leonard N. Stern	Stern 1957, B.S., 1959, M.B.A.	Namesake of NYU's Stern School of Business; CEO of Hartz Group	
Juan Antonio Samaranch Salisachs	Stern, M.B.A.	Member of International Olympic Committee	
Sy Syms	CAS B.A., 1946	Founder of Syms Clothing	
Henry Taub	Stern 1947, B.S.	Founder of Automatic Data Processing, philanthropist	
Maurice Tempelsman	Stern*	Chairman of Lazare Kaplan International Inc.; former companion of Jacqueline Kennedy Onassis	
Laurence Alan Tisch	Stern 1942, B.Sc.	Media mogul; president and chief executive officer, CBS	
Christy Turlington	Gallatin 1999, B.A.	Supermodel	
Agnes Varis	Stern 1979, M.B.A.	Founder of Aegis Pharmaceuticals	
Peggy Yu	Stern, M.B.A.	Founder of dangdang.com, the largest online Chinese language retailer	
Jack Dorsey		Creator of Twitter; founder and CEO of Block, Inc.	
George W. Melville	POLY	Chief of Bureau of Steam Engineering	
Spencer Trask	POLY	Invested and supported entrepreneurs, including Thomas Edison's invention of electric light bulb and his electricity network; majority shareholder and chairman of The New York Times	
Hugh John Casey	POLY	Chairman of New York City Transit Authority	
Michael Horodniceanu	POLY	President of MTA Capital Construction	
Alfred Amoroso	POLY	Former chairman of Yahoo!	
John Dionisio	POLY	Chairman and CEO of AECOM	
Charles D. Strang	POLY	Chairman, president and CEO of Outboard Marine Corporation	
Herbert L. Henkel	POLY	Chairman of Ingersoll Rand	
Israel Borovich	POLY	Chairman and CEO of EL AL	
Jason Hsuan	POLY	Chairman and CEO of TPV Technology	
John Trani	POLY	Former chairman and CEO of Stanley Black & Decker	
John Elmer McKeen	POLY	Former chairman and CEO of Pfizer; member of National Academy of Engineering	
Alfred P. Sloan	POLY	Former chairman and CEO of General Motors	
Mark Ronald	POLY	Former chairman and CEO of BAE Systems Inc.	
Joseph J. Jacobs	POLY	Former chairman and founder of Jacobs Engineering Group	
Paul Ferri	POLY	Founder and general partner of Matrix Partners	
Bern Dibner	POLY	Former chairman, founder and CEO of Burndy	
Sunil Godhwani	POLY	Chairman and CEO of Religare	
Jerome Swartz	POLY	Co-founded Symbol Technologies with POLY graduate Shelley A. Harrison	
Samuel Ruben	POLY	Co-founded Duracell	
Richard Santulli	POLY, B.S., M.S.	Former chairman, founder and CEO of NetJets; current chairman and founder of Milestone Aviation Group	
Paul Soros	POLY	Founder and former CEO of Soros Associates; brother of George Soros	
Michael H. Kappaz	POLY	Chairman and CEO of KM Group	
Vincent A. Calarco	POLY	CEO and president of Chemtura	
Charles Hinkaty	POLY	Vice president at Citibank	
David Sobin	POLY	CEO of BAMnet; founded a DSL company, subsequently sold for approximately $50M	
Edward P. Gilligan	Stern	Vice chairman, president of American Express	
Glenford Myers	POLY	Founder of RadiSys and IP Fabrics	
Ami Miron	POLY	Vice president of General Instrument; senior advisor at Wharton School of University of Pennsylvania and Columbia University	
Stav Prodromou	POLY	Founder and former CEO of Poqet Computer Corporation; former CEO of Alien Technology and Peregrine Semiconductor; executive vice president of Fairchild Semiconductor	
Craig G. Matthews	POLY	President, CFO and chief operating officer of KeySpan	
Ira Drukier	POLY	Hotelier and philanthropist	
Fadi Chehadé	POLY	Founder of RosettaNet; chief executive officer of ICANN	
Nils Lahr	POLY	Co-founder of IBEAM Broadcasting Corporation and Synergy Sports Technology	
William C. W. Mow	POLY	Chairman and CEO of Bugle Boy	
Charles Waldo Haskins	POLY	Co-founder of Haskins and Sells	
Zalman Bernstein	CAS	Businessman and economist	
John Paulson	Stern	Hedge fund manager	
Kenneth Langone	Stern	Co-founder of The Home Depot	
Charles Kushner	CAS	Owner of Kushner Properties	
Jared Kushner	Law	President and CEO of Kushner Properties; owner of The New York Observer	
Vincent Tchenguiz	Stern	Investment adviser	
Rachelle Friedman	POLY	Founder of J&R	
Bill Friend	POLY	Former president of Bechtel	
Link Lauren	Music Business, B.S.	Online content creator, former senior campaign advisor to Robert F. Kennedy Jr.	
Alan Schriesheim	POLY	Board member of Rohm and Haas	
Stephen M. Ross	Law	Real-estate developer; owner of Miami Dolphins	
Robin Wilson	SPS 2004, M.S	Founder and CEO of bedding and interior design company Robin Wilson Home	
B. Gerald Cantor		Founder and chairman of securities firm Cantor Fitzgerald	
Charles Zegar		Computer scientists; one of four co-founders of Bloomberg L.P.	
Richard C. Perry	Stern	Hedge fund manager, owns controlling interest in Barneys New York	
Ira Rennert	Stern	Private investor in mining, metals, and heavy industry	
Lawrence Babbio Jr.	Stern	Former vice chairman and president of Verizon	
Mark Wilf	Law	President and co-owner of Minnesota Vikings	
Daniel E. Straus	Law	Vice chairman of Memphis Grizzlies	
Dan Schulman	Stern, M.B.A.	President and CEO of PayPal and chairman of Symantec; co-founder and former CEO of Virgin Mobile USA	
George S. Barrett	Stern, M.B.A.	Chairman and chief executive officer of Cardinal Health, Inc.	
Robert W. Cremin	POLY, B.S.	Chairman, president, and chief executive officer of Esterline; chairman of Dover Corporation	
Lorenzo Fertitta	Stern, M.B.A.	Co-founder of Station Casinos	
Larry Zimmerman	Stern	CFO of Xerox	
Charles A. Heimbold Jr.	Stern	Chairman and CEO of Bristol-Myers Squibb Company	
Barry Salzberg	Law	CEO of Deloitte	
Evan Chesler	Law	Partner and former chairman of Cravath, Swaine & Moore	
John Carrig	Law	Chief operating officer and president for ConocoPhillips	
Robert I. Lipp	Law	Vice chairman of Citigroup	
Robert A. Kindler	Law	Vice chairman of Morgan Stanley	
John Turitzin	Law	Vice president of Marvel Entertainment	
Herb Kelleher	Law	Founder, chairman emeritus and former CEO of Southwest Airlines	
Nick Ivanoff	POLY	President and CEO of Ammann & Whitney; elected 2014–2015 chairman of American Road and Transportation Builders Association	
Peter Guber	Law	Hollywood producer; former chairman and CEO of Sony Pictures Entertainment	
Steven Florio	Stern	CEO and president of Conde Nast Publications and The New Yorker; publisher of GQ	
Barry Zyskind	Stern, M.B.A	Chairman, CEO and president of AmTrust Financial Services	
Sashi Reddi	Courant	CEO and founder of App Labs	

== Entertainment ==
Name	Relation to NYU	Notability	Reference
Lucy Alibar	TSOA	Beasts of the Southern Wild	
Paul Thomas Anderson	TSOA 1993*, dropped out after two days	Magnolia, Boogie Nights, There Will Be Blood	
Aziz Ansari	Stern 2004, B.S	Actor, Parks and Recreation, Master of None, Human Giant, Scrubs; stand-up comedian	
Ashley Argota	NURSING, current student	True Jackson, VP, Bucket & Skinner's Epic Adventures	
Jeff Baena	TSOA	Film writer and director	
Sean Baker	TSOA	Director, Tangerine, The Florida Project and Anora	
Alec Baldwin	TSOA 1993, B.F.A.	Actor, The Hunt for Red October, Pearl Harbor, The Aviator, 30 Rock	
Kristen Bell	TSOA 1998–2001*	Veronica Mars, Pulse, Heroes, Forgetting Sarah Marshall, Gossip Girl	
Julie Benz	TSOA 1994, B.F.A.	Jawbreaker, Angel, Buffy the Vampire Slayer	
Laura Berman	SSW	Sex educator and sex therapist; host of In the Bedroom with Dr. Laura Berman on the Oprah Winfrey Network	
Justin Blanchard	TSOA 2001, B.F.A.	Journey's End (Broadway), Law & Order: Special Victims Unit	
Alexis Bledel	TSOA*	Gilmore Girls, Sin City, Sisterhood of the Traveling Pants, Tuck Everlasting	
Rachel Bloom	TSOA	Crazy Ex-Girlfriend	
Barry Bostwick	TSOA	Original Broadway cast of Grease, Rocky Horror Picture Show, Spin City	
Martin Brest	TSOA 1973, B.F.A.	Beverly Hills Cop, Meet Joe Black, Gigli	
Lisa Bruce	TSOA	The Theory of Everything	
Rustica Carpio	Steinhardt 1956, M.A.	Actress and writer; former dean of College of Communication and Graduate School of Polytechnic University of the Philippines; appointed to Philippine government positions	
Susan Cartsonis	TSOA	President of Wind Dance Films	
Vinnette Justine Carroll	ARTS 1946, M.A.	First African-American woman to direct on Broadway	
Lenora Champagne	ARTS 1975, M.A., 1980 PhD.	Playwright, performance artist and director	
Jennifer Charles	TSOA 1990, B.F.A.	Musician, writer, and actress	
Rachel Chavkin	TSOA	Tony Award-nominated director of Broadway musical Natasha, Pierre & The Great Comet of 1812	
Chris Columbus	TSOA	Both Home Alone films, Mrs. Doubtfire, Stepmom, first two Harry Potter films, Rent	
Bud Cort	TSOA 1967–1969*	Harold and Maude, M*A*S*H, The Life Aquatic with Steve Zissou	
Allen Covert		Grandma's Boy, The Wedding Singer	
Billy Crudup	TSOA 1994, M.F.A.	Sleepers, Big Fish, Watchmen, Public Enemies	
Billy Crystal	TSOA 1970, B.F.A.	Analyze This, Analyze That, City Slickers 1 & 2, When Harry Met Sally	
John Cusack	TSOA*	High Fidelity, Con Air	
Emira D'Spain	STEINHARDT, STERN	Model, social media influencer	
Drea de Matteo	TSOA	The Sopranos, Joey	
Julie Delpy	TSOA	Homo Faber, Three Colors: White, Before Sunrise, Before Sunset	
Amanda Detmer	TSOA, M.F.A.	Actress	
Tony DiSanto	TSOA	Producer	
Michael Dougherty	TSOA, M.F.A.	X2, Superman Returns	
Lisa Edelstein	TSOA 1988, B.F.A.	House	
Lindsay Ellis	TSOA, B.A. 2007	YouTuber, author of Axiom's End	
Kathryn Erbe	TSOA*	What About Bob?, Law and Order: Criminal Intent	
Burcu Esmersoy	SPS*	Turkish anchorwoman, beauty pageant titleholder, journalist, model, and occasional actress	
Raul Esparza	TSOA 1992, B.F.A.	[Actor, Hannibal, Law & Order SVU	
Dakota Fanning	GAL, current student	Actress, I Am Sam, Charlotte's Web, Coraline, The Twilight Saga: New Moon, Eclipse, Breaking Dawn	
Mitch Fatel	TSOA 1988*	The Tonight Show with Jay Leno, Comedy Central Presents: Mitch Fatel, Super Retardo CD	
Wayne Federman	TSOA 1981*	Curb Your Enthusiasm, Legally Blonde, The 40-Year-Old Virgin, Silicon Valley	
Malindi Fickle	B.F.A., 2002	Jacklight, Suck it Up Buttercup	
Bridget Fonda	TSOA 1987, B.F.A.	Doc Hollywood, Jackie Brown	
Marc Forster	TSOA 1990–1993*	Monster's Ball, Finding Neverland	
Bethenny Frankel	WSC 1992	The Real Housewives of New York City, Bethenny Ever After, Bethenny; creator/owner of Skinnygirl	
Griffin Frazen	GAL 2009, B.A.	Grounded For Life	
Lady Gaga	TSOA	Singer	
Melissa Gallo	TSOA 2003, B.F.A.	One Life to Live, Brooklyn Nine-Nine	
Edi Gathegi	TSOA	Gone Baby Gone, House M.D., CSI: Crime Scene Investigation, Twilight, The Twilight Saga: New Moon	
Jordan Gelber	TSOA	Avenue Q, The Sopranos, Law & Order: SVU	
Gina Gershon	TSOA 1983, B.F.A.	The Insider, Showgirls, Bound	
Tavi Gevinson	GAL*	Editor, writer, actress	
Donald Glover	TSOA 2006, B.F.A	Actor, rapper under the stage name Childish Gambino	
Mark Gordon	TSOA	Television and film producer; former president of Producers Guild of America	
Lou Gossett	CAS, 1959, B.A.	Roots, An Officer and a Gentleman	
Bryan Greenberg	TSOA*	Prime	
Ms. Rachel	STEINHARDT	YouTuber, social media personality, songwriter, and educator	
Peter Guber	Stern, M.B.A.	Mandalay Pictures	
Matthew Gray Gubler	TSOA 2002, M.F.A.	Criminal Minds, (500) Days of Summer, 68 Kill, The Life Aquatic with Steve Zissou	
Michael C. Hall	TSOA 1996, M.F.A.	Six Feet Under, Dexter	
Regina Hall	GSAS 1997, M.A.	Scary Movie	
Walter Hampden	POLY	Actor	
Wood Harris	TSOA 1983, M.F.A.	Above the Rim	
Anne Hathaway	Gallatin, TSOA*	The Princess Diaries, The Devil Wears Prada, Ella Enchanted, Rachel Gets Married, Alice in Wonderland	
Ethan Hawke	CAS*	Training Day, Dead Poets Society, Before Sunrise, Before Sunset	
Amy Heckerling	TSOA, B.F.A.	Look Who's Talking, Loser, Clueless	
Antony Hegarty	TSOA (E.T.W.) 1992 B.F.A.	Antony and the Johnsons: Swanlights, The Crying Light, I Am a Bird Now (UK Mercury Prize 2005)	
Israel Hicks	M.F.A.	Stage director who presented August Wilson's entire 10-play Pittsburgh Cycle	
Philip Seymour Hoffman	TSOA 1989, B.F.A.	Capote, Boogie Nights, Happiness, Magnolia, The Talented Mr. Ripley, Almost Famous	
Todd Holoubek	TSOA 2002, B.F.A.	MTV: The State	
Wendy Hoopes	TSOA 2002, B.F.A.	Spinster, Killing Cinderella, Daria	
Stephanie Hsu	TSOA 2012, B.F.A.	Everything Everywhere All at Once, The Marvelous Mrs. Maisel	
Edward Everett Horton	POLY	Character actor	
Bryce Dallas Howard	TSOA	The Village, Lady in the Water, Terminator Salvation, Twilight: Eclipse	
Shawn Michael Howard	TSOA, B.F.A.	Boycott, Above the Rim, 3000 Miles to Graceland	
Neal Huff	TSOA, M.F.A.	Take Me Out, The Little Dog Laughed	
Felicity Huffman	TSOA	Transamerica, Desperate Housewives	
Mark Indelicato	GAL, current student	Actor	
Jim Jarmusch	TSOA*	Stranger than Paradise, Down By Law, Broken Flowers	
Tamara Jenkins	TSOA	Slums of Beverly Hills	
Alexa Ray Joel	TSOA*	Singer-songwriter, pianist	
Kristen Johnston	TSOA, B.F.A.	3rd Rock from the Sun	
Hansol Jung	One-year exchange program	Playwright: Wolf Play, Wild Goose Dreams, No More Sad Things	
Jeffrey Katzenberg	TSOA*	Shrek; co-founder of DreamWorks	
Anna Khachiyan	M.A.	Co-host of Red Scare podcast	
Daniel Dae Kim	TSOA 1996, M.F.A.	Lost, Hawaii Five-0	
Karlie Kloss	GAL, current student	Fashion model	
Stanley Kramer	TSOA 1993, B.F.A.	High Noon, Cyrano de Bergerac	
Peter Krause	TSOA 1990, M.F.A.	Six Feet Under, Parenthood, 9-1-1	
Martin Kunert	TSOA	Voices of Iraq, MTV's Fear	
Steven Kunes	GAL	TV writer and executive producer	
Tony Kushner	TSOA 1984, M.F.A.	Tony Award	
Eriq La Salle	TSOA, B.F.A.	ER	
Ang Lee	TSOA, M.F.A.	Life of Pi, Brokeback Mountain, Crouching Tiger, Hidden Dragon, Sense and Sensibility	
Edward Lee	CAS B.A.	Celebrity chef	
Spike Lee	TSOA 1982, M.F.A.	Malcolm X, Do the Right Thing, Bamboozled, Jungle Fever	
Thomas Lennon		MTV: The State, Reno 911!, Taxi (screenwriter)	
Ken Leung	CAS, B.A.	Lost, X-Men: The Last Stand, Shanghai Kiss	
Janet Lilly	TSOA 1982, B.A.	Principal dancer for Bill T. Jones/Arnie Zane Dance Company	
Bai Ling	TSOA 1991–??	Anna and the King	
Zoe Lister-Jones	TSOA B.A.	The Little Dog Laughed	
Victoria Loke	GAL	Actress	
Julia Loktev	M.F.A	The Loneliest Planet, Day Night Day Night, Moment of Impact	
Billie Lourd	GAL	Actress	
Brigette Lundy-Paine	2015	Actor, Atypical, Bill & Ted Face the Music, I Saw the TV Glow	
Bruce Mailman	M.F.A.	Theatre founder of nightclub The Saint	
Charlotte Manson		Radio actress	
Rooney Mara	GAL*	The Girl With the Dragon Tattoo, Trash, Her	
Demetri Martin	Law	Comedian, actor, artist, musician, writer, and humorist	
Jesse L. Martin	TSOA 1989, M.F.A.	Ed Green on Law and Order; Rent	
Mary Stuart Masterson	TSOA*	Fried Green Tomatoes, The Postman	
Melina Matsoukas	TSOA*	Director of "We Found Love" by Rihanna, "Diva" by Beyoncé	
Dwayne McDuffie	TSOA	Television, film, and comic book writer, producer, and editor	
John C. McGinley	TSOA	Intensity, Scrubs, Point Break	
Camila Mendes	TSOA 2016	Veronica Lodge on Riverdale	
Idina Menzel	TSOA*	Wicked, Rent, Enchanted, Rescue Me, Frozen	
Ismail Merchant	Stern, M.B.A.	Co-founded Merchant Ivory Productions	
Debra Messing	TSOA 1987, M.F.A.	Will and Grace, NBC's Smash	
Leah Meyerhoff	TSOA 2007, M.F.A.	Twitch	
Matthew Morrison	TSOA 1993, B.F.A.	Glee, The Hunt for Red October, Pearl Harbor, The Aviator, 30 Rock	
Rachel Morrison	TSOA	Fruitvale Station, Cake, Sound of My Voice	
Kate Mulgrew	TSOA 1976, A.A.	Star Trek: Voyager, Orange is the New Black	
Javier Muñoz	TSOA	Actor, played Usnavi in Broadway musical In the Heights; currently playing titular role in Hamilton	
Jeff Nimoy	CAS, B.A.	Naruto, Digimon, Trigun	
Jerry O'Connell	TSOA 1997, B.F.A.	Crossing Jordan, Mission to Mars	
Charlie O'Connell	TSOA 1995, B.F.A.	Sliders, The Bachelor	
Vivek Oberoi	TSOA	Indian actor	
Ryan Scott Oliver	TSOA 2007, M.F.A	Musical theatre composer, Mrs. Sharp, Darling, 35MM	
Ashley Olsen	GAL*	Full House, It Takes Two, Two of a Kind, New York Minute	
Elizabeth Olsen	TSOA 2013	Martha, Marcy, May, Marlene, Avengers: Age of Ultron, Godzilla, In Secret	
Mary Kate Olsen	GAL	Full House, It Takes Two, Two of a Kind, New York Minute	
Haley Joel Osment	TSOA 2010, B.F.A.	The Sixth Sense, Pay It Forward, AI, Secondhand Lions	
Pedro Pascal	TSOA B.F.A.	Game of Thrones, Narcos, The Mandalorian, Wonder Woman 1984	
Jeremy Piven	TSOA	Actor and producer; best known for his role as Ari Gold in Entourage, for which he won a Golden Globe Award and three consecutive Emmy Awards	
Joya Powell	STEINHARDT 2005, M.A.	Bessie Awards-winning choreographer and educator	
Keith Powell	TSOA	Television actor, 30 Rock	
Jorge Pupo	TSOA 1981, B.F.A.	Actor, narrator	
Ted Raimi	B.A.	seaQuest DSV, Xena: Warrior Princess	
Anthony Rapp	TSOA 1989*	Rent, Six Degrees of Separation, Dazed and Confused	
Brett Ratner	TSOA	Tower Heist, New York, I Love You, Rush Hour	
AnnaSophia Robb	GAL, current student	Actress	
Matt Rogers	CAS	Las Culturistas, I Love That For You, Fire Island	
Meg Ryan	CAS, B.A.	When Harry Met Sally..., Sleepless in Seattle, City of Angels, You've Got Mail	
Joshua Safran	TSOA	Executive producer and writer of Gossip Girl; executive producer and showrunner for the second season of Smash; creator, executive producer and showrunner of Quantico	
Adam Sandler	TSOA 1991, B.F.A.	Mr. Deeds, Big Daddy, Punchdrunk Love, Funny People, Hotel Transylvania, Happy Gilmore, Billy Madison, Saturday Night Live, GrownUps	
Andy Samberg	TSOA 2000, B.F.A.	The Lonely Island, Saturday Night Live, Hot Rod, Brooklyn 99, Hotel Transylvania, Popstar, Celeste & Jessie Forever, Storks, The Unauthorized Bash Brothers Experience	
Taylor Schilling	TSOA	Actress; Screen Actors Guild Awards winner	
Lenny Schultz	B.S.	Comedian and gym teacher	
Martin Scorsese	CAS 1964, B.A Steinhardt 1966, M.A.	The Aviator, Casino, Goodfellas, The Last Temptation of Christ, Taxi Driver, Raging Bull, Gangs of New York	
Rachel Sennott	TSOA, 2017	Bottoms, Shiva Baby, I Love LA	
Joshua Seth	CAS, 1991, B.A.	Digimon, Wolf's Rain, Trigun	
John Patrick Shanley	Steinhardt 1977, M.A.	Moonstruck; winner of Pulitzer Prize for Drama	
Sheetal Sheth	TSOA 1997, B.A.	ABCD, Looking for Comedy in the Muslim World	
M. Night Shyamalan	TSOA	The Sixth Sense, Unbreakable, Signs, The Village, The Last Airbender, Lady in the Water	
Neil Simon	ARTS 1944–1945*	The Odd Couple; winner of 1991 Pulitzer Prize for Drama	
Barry Sonnenfeld	TSOA*	Oz, Men in Black, Get Shorty	
Eulalie Spence	B.S. 1937	Her, Fool's Errand (opened on Broadway in 1927)	
Cole Sprouse	GAL 2015	Friends, Big Daddy, The Suite Life of Zack and Cody, The Suite Life on Deck, narrator and Jughead Jones on Riverdale	
Dylan Sprouse	GAL 2015	The Suite Life of Zack and Cody, Big Daddy, The Suite Life on Deck	
Morgan Spurlock	TSOA, B.F.A.	Supersize Me	
Peter Steinfeld	B.A.	Drowning Mona, Be Cool, 21	
Peter Sullivan	TSOA	Director, producer, and screenwriter, Secret Obsession	
Maura Tierney	TSOA*	ER, Newsradio, Primary Colors	
Shenaz Treasury	Took writing course	MTV's Most Wanted, Ishq Vishk, One Life to Live, Luv Ka The End	
Colin Trevorrow	TSOA	Home Base, Safety Not Guaranteed, Jurassic World, The Book of Henry	
Skeet Ulrich	NYU	Scream, F.P. Jones on Riverdale	
Sunny Wang	Stern, Tisch, B.A., 2005	Taiwanese actor and model	
Casey Wilson	TSOA, 2002	Happy Endings, Saturday Night Live	
Chandra Wilson	TSOA 1991, B.F.A.	Grey's Anatomy	
Mara Wilson	TSOA, 2009, B.F.A.	Matilda, Mrs. Doubtfire, Miracle on 34th Street	
Rainn Wilson	TSOA, M.F.A.	The Office	
Agnieszka Wojtowicz-Vosloo	TSOA 2003, B.F.A.	After.Life	
Doug Wright	TSOA 1987	Quills; winner of Pulitzer Prize for Drama	
Bowen Yang	CAS B.A.	Saturday Night Live	

=== Music ===
Name	Relation to NYU	Notability	Reference
Arca	TSOA	Grammy-nominated musician, record producer, and DJ	
Milton Babbitt	B.A., 1935	1986 MacArthur Fellow, 1982 Pulitzer Prize special citation	
Arthur Berger	B.A., 1932	Composer	
Cy Coleman	Steinhardt	Tony Award for City of Angels 1990, On the Twentieth Century 1978	
Betty Comden	Steinhardt	Partner of Adolph Green, recipient of several Tony Awards	
DJ Cuppy	Steinhardt	Nigerian music producer; daughter of Nigerian billionaire Femi Otedola	
Dasychira	TSOA, 2019	Performer, songwriter, producer	
Clive Davis	CAS 1953, B.A.	Founder of Arista Records	
Carlos Dengler	CAS	Interpol's first bassist/keyboardist	
Neil Diamond	CAS 2003, Hon. Ph.D.	Singer/songwriter	
Dot da Genius	POLY	Singer, record producer and mixing engineer	
Dave Douglas	Steinhardt, B.A.	Jazz trumpeter	
Greg Drudy	Previous student	Interpol's first drummer	
Hayden Dunham	GAL	Musician, performance artist, designer	
Fred Ebb	B.A., 1939	1967 Tony Award, 1967 Grammy Award for Cabaret	
Lady Gaga	TSOA*		
Bernard Garfield	B.A., 1948	Bassoonist and composer	
Midori Goto	GAL 2000, B.A.; NYU 2005, M.A.	Violinist	
A Great Big World	Steinhardt	Singers and songwriters, known for Grammy Award-winning song "Say Something"	
Albert Hammond Jr.	TSOA	The Strokes' guitarist	
Antony Hegarty	TSOA	Mercury prize-winning lead singer of Antony and the Johnsons	
Izza	LSS	Singer and rapper	
Daniel Kessler	GAL	Interpol's guitarist/backing vocalist	
Paul Banks	GAL	Interpol's guitarist/lead vocalist	
Talib Kweli	Previous student	Member of rap duo Black Star	
Elodie Lauten	Steinhardt 1986, M.A.	Composer	
Tania León	Steinhardt	Conductor, composer of "Scourge of Hyacinths"	
Enoch Light	Steinhardt	Pioneer of music recording	
Melissa Manchester	Independent studies, 1970–1971	1982 Grammy Award	
Jackie McCullough	M.A. Philosophy	Gospel musician and pastor	
David Portner	Former student	Founding member of experimental band Animal Collective	
Maggie Rogers	B.F.A., 2016	Musician	
Jerry Ross	Studied under Rudolph Schramm	Composer	
Rick Rubin	Former student, lived on campus	Co-founder of Def Jam while at NYU	
Carole Bayer Sager	B.A., 1979	1987 Grammy Award	
Jai Wolf	GAL	DJ and producer	
Blake Schwarzenbach	B.A., 1991	Lead singer of bands Jawbreaker and Jets to Brazil	
Patti Scialfa	Gallatin; received music degree after transferring from University Of Miami	Singer and guitarist with Bruce Springsteen's E Street Band	
Wayne Shorter	Steinhardt 1956, B.M.E.	Influential hard-bop and modal jazz saxophonist	
Russell Simmons	Former student	Co-founder of Def Jam while at NYU	
William Oscar Smith	B.A., 1942	Jazz double bassist, known for 1939 Coleman Hawkins recording of Body and Soul	
Eileen Southern	Steinhardt 1961, Ph.D.	First African American woman appointed a tenured full professor at Harvard	
Taylor Swift	TSOA honorary Doctor of Fine Arts degree	Singer and songwriter, multiple Grammy Awards	
Louise Talma	B.A., 1927	Composer	
Elle Varner	TSOA	Singer, songwriter, producer	
Vitamin C	B.A., 1991		
Mary Wilson	Gallatin	The Supremes	
Austin Wintory	Steinhardt, B.M., 2005	Grammy-nominated composer for video games and film	

=== Academy Award winners ===
Name	Relation to NYU	Notability	Reference
Mahershala Ali	TSOA 2000, M.F.A.	Academy Award 2017, Moonlight; 2019, Green Book	
Woody Allen	TSOA 1953*	Academy Award 1977, Annie Hall; 1986, Hannah and her Sisters	
Michael Arndt	TSOA 1987	Academy Award 2007, Little Miss Sunshine	
Sean Baker	TSOA 1998 B.F.A	Academy Award 2025, Anora	
Elmer Bernstein	ARTS 1942, B.A.	Academy Award 1968, Thoroughly Modern Millie	
Mark Bridges	ARTS 1987, M.F.A.	Academy Award 2012, The Artist	
James L. Brooks	TSOA*	Academy Award 1984, Terms of Endearment	
John Canemaker	TSOA	Academy Award 2006, The Moon and the Son	
Joel Coen	TSOA, 1978, B.F.A.	Academy Award 1996, Fargo; 2008, No Country For Old Men	
Geoff Fletcher	TSOA 1999, M.F.A.	Academy Award 2010, Precious	
Whoopi Goldberg	GSAS	Academy Award 1991, Ghost	
Steve Golin	TSOA	Academy Award 2016, Spotlight	
Louis Gossett Jr.	ARTS coursework*	Academy Award 1982, An Officer and a Gentleman	
Marcia Gay Harden	TSOA 1981, M.F.A.	Academy Award 2000, Pollock	
Anne Hathaway	GAL, TSOA	Academy Award 2012, Les Misérables	
Bernard Herrmann	WSC student under Percy Grainger	Academy Award 1941, The Devil and Daniel Webster	
Lora Hirschberg	TSOA 1985, B.F.A.	Academy Award 2011, Inception	
Philip Seymour Hoffman	TSOA 1989, B.F.A.	Academy Award 2005, Capote	
Angelina Jolie	TSOA 1993, B.F.A.	Academy Award 2000, Girl, Interrupted	
Charles Kaufman	TSOA 1980	Academy Award 2004, Eternal Sunshine of the Spotless Mind	
Burt Lancaster	TSOA coursework*	Academy Award 1960, Elmer Gantry	
Ang Lee	TSOA, M.F.A.	Academy Award 2005, Brokeback Mountain; 2012, Life of Pi	
Spike Lee	TSOA, M.F.A.	Academy Award 2019, BlacKkKlansman	
Luke Matheny	TSOA, M.F.A.	Academy Award 2011, God of Love	
Alan Menken	ARTS, B.A.	Academy Award 1995, Pocahontas; 1992, Aladdin; 1991, Beauty and the Beast; 1989, The Little Mermaid	
László Nemes	TSOA	Academy Award 2016, Son of Saul	
Ken Perlin	GSAS 1986, Ph.D.	Academy Award 1997, for the development of Perlin noise	
Carole Bayer Sager	CAS 1979, B.A.	Academy Award 1981, Arthur's Theme	
Thelma Schoonmaker	TSOA	Academy Award 2005, The Aviator	
John Patrick Shanley	Steinhardt 1977, M.A.	Academy Award 1987, Moonstruck	
Oliver Stone	TSOA 1970, M.F.A.	Academy Award 1978, Midnight Express; 1986, Platoon; 1989, Born on the Fourth of July	
Jim Taylor	TSOA 1996	Academy Award 2004, Sideways	
Marisa Tomei	TSOA 1983, B.F.A.	Academy Award 1992, My Cousin Vinny	
Fred Waller	POLY	Academy Award winner; inventor of Cinerama; inventor of Waller Gunnery Trainer; first to patent the water ski; made 200 short films for Paramount Pictures	
Paul Francis Webster	ARTS 1928–1930 *	Academy Award 1953, Secret Love	
Victor J. Zolfo	TSOA 1985	Academy Award 2009, The Curious Case of Benjamin Button	

=== Emmy Award winners ===
Name	Relation to NYU	Notability	Reference
Woody Allen	TSOA 1953*	Emmy Award 1957	
Aziz Ansari	STERN	Emmy Award 2016 for Master of None	
Rachel Brosnahan	TSOA 2012, B.F.A.	Emmy Award 2017 for The Marvelous Mrs. Maisel	
Sterling K. Brown	TSOA	Emmy Award 2016 for The People v. O.J. Simpson: American Crime Story	
Vinnette Justine Carroll	GSAS 1946, M.A.	Emmy Award 1964 for Beyond the Blues	
Cy Coleman	Steinhardt	Emmy Award	
Ayo Edebiri	TSOA 2017	Emmy Award 2024 for The Bear	
Wayne Federman	TSOA	Emmy Award 2022, producer, George Carlin's American Dream	
Vince Gilligan	TSOA	Emmy Award, writer and producer for The X-Files	
Emily Harper	TSOA	Emmy Award 2016 for Key & Peele	
Tony Kushner	TSOA 1984, M.F.A.	Emmy Award	
Harvey Leonard	ENG, M.S.	Received two New England Emmy Awards for outstanding achievement in television weathercasting	
Camryn Manheim	TSOA 1987, M.F.A.	Emmy Award for The Practice	
Jonathan Meath	TSOA 1979, B.A.	Emmy nominations for TV production	
Debra Messing	TSOA 1993, M.F.A.	Emmy Award 2003 for Will and Grace	
David Milhous	TSOA 1991, B.F.A.	Emmy Award 2017 for Crime Watch Daily	
Ami Miron	POLY, M.S.	Received two Technology & Engineering Emmy Awards	
Olivia Smith	Steinhardt 2011, B.S.	Emmy Award 2016 for Dead Horse Bay: New York's Hidden Treasure Trove of Trash	
Jonathan Stern	TSOA	Emmy Award 2016 for Childrens Hospital	
Paul Tazewell	TSOA	Emmy Award 2016 for The Wiz Live!	
David Wain	TSOA	Emmy Award 2016 for Childrens Hospital	
Jeffrey Wright	TSOA*	Emmy Award 2003	

=== Grammy Award winners ===
Name	Relation to NYU	Notability	Reference
Ian Axel	Steinhardt	Grammy Award 2015 for "Say Something"	
Cy Coleman	Steinhardt	1992 Grammy Award for The Will Rogers Follies	
Todd Coolman	Steinhardt	1999 Grammy Award for Best Album Notes	
Fred Ebb	ARTS 1955, B.A.	Grammy Award 1967 for Cabaret	
Lady Gaga	TSOA* 2003–2005	Grammy Awards 2010, 2011, and 2015 recipient in several categories	
Chad King	Steinhardt	Grammy Award 2015 for "Say Something"	
Evelyn Lear		Grammy Award 1966 for her performance of the opera Wozzeck by Alban Berg	
Melissa Manchester	TSOA 1970–1971	Grammy Award 1982 for "You Should Hear How She Talks About You"	
Mark Ronson	TSOA*	Grammy Award 2007 for producer on Amy Winehouse's Back to Black	
Rick Rubin	CAS*	Grammy Award 2012 for producer on Adele's 21	
Carole Bayer Sager	CAS 1979, B.A.	Grammy Award 1987 for "That's What Friends Are For"	
Wayne Shorter	Steinhardt 1956, B.M.E.	Grammy Award 2004 for the album Alegria	
Mary Wilson	GAL	Grammy Award 1999 and 2001 with The Supremes	

=== Tony Award winners ===
Name	Relation to NYU	Tony Awards won	Reference
Nina Arianda	TSOA 2009, M.F.A.	"Best Actress in a Play" for Venus in Fur (2012)	
Marc Bell	SPS 1989, M.S.R.E.	Producer; "Best Musical" for Jersey Boys (2006), "Best Play" for August: Osage County (2008), "Best Play" for Stereophonic (2024)	
Trazana Beverley	TSOA, M.F.A.	"Best Featured Actress in a Play" For Colored Girls Who Have Considered Suicide / When the Rainbow Is Enuf (1977)	
Barry Bostwick	TSOA, 1968 M.F.A.	"Best Actor in a Musical" for The Robber Bridegroom	
Cy Coleman	Steinhardt	Composer, five Tony Awards 1978–1991	
Betty Comden	Steinhardt	Librettist, 12 Tony Awards 1953–1991	
Fred Ebb	ARTS 1955, B.A.	Lyricist, three Tony Awards: Cabaret (1967), Woman of the Year 1981, Kiss of the Spider Woman (1993)	
Marcia Gay Harden	TSOA, 1988 M.F.A.	"Best Actress in a Play" for God of Carnage (2009)	
Nikki M. James	TSOA 2003, B.F.A.	"Best Featured Actress in a Musical" for The Book of Mormon (2011)	
Steve Kazee	TSOA 2005, M.F.A.	"Best Actor in a Musical" for Once (2011)	
Bradley King	TSOA, M.F.A.	"Best Lighting Design in a Musical" for Natasha, Pierre, & The Great Comet of 1812 (2017)	
Tony Kushner	TSOA 1984, M.F.A.	Playwright, "Best Play" Angels in America (part 1 in 1993, part 2 in 1994)	
Mimi Lien	TSOA 2003, M.F.A.	"Best Scenic Design in a Musical" for Natasha, Pierre, & The Great Comet of 1812 (2017)	
Idina Menzel	TSOA 1993, B.F.A.	"Best Actress in a Musical" for Wicked (2004)	
Donna Murphy	TSOA 1980, B.F.A.	"Best Actress in a Musical" for Passion (1994) and The King and I (1996)	
Clint Ramos	TSOA 1997, M.F.A	"Best Costume Design in a Play" for Eclipsed (2016)	
John Patrick Shanley	Steinhardt 1977, M.A.	Playwright, "Best Play" for Doubt: A Parable (2005)	
Stephen Spinella	TSOA, 1982 M.F.A.	"Best Featured Actor in a Play" for Angels in America (part 1, 1993), "Best Actor in a Play" for Angels in America (part 2, 1994)	
Paul Tazewell	TSOA 1989, M.F.A	"Best Costume Design in a Musical" for Hamilton (2016)	
Barbara Whitman	GAL 1988	Producer, four Tony Awards: Red (2010), Hedwig and the Angry Inch (2014), Fun Home (2015), The Humans (2016)	
Jeff Whitty	TSOA, 1997 M.F.A.	"Best Book" for Avenue Q (2003)	
Liz Williamson (dancer)	M.F.A.	Dancer with Alvin Ailey American Dance Theater, first artist-in-residence at Jacob's Pillow	
George C. Wolfe	TSOA, M.F.A.	"Best Direction of a Play" for Angels in America (1993), "Best Direction of a Musical" for Bring in 'da Noise, Bring in 'da Funk (1996)	
Frank Wood	TSOA, 1987 M.F.A.	"Best Featured Actor in a Play" for Side Man (1999)	
David Zinn	TSOA 1991, B.F.A	"Best Scenic Design in a Play" for The Humans (2016)	

== Medicine ==
Name	Relation to NYU	Notability	Reference
Arthur Agatston	Med 1973, M.D.	Author of The South Beach Diet	
Julius Axelrod	Med 1941, M.Sc.	1970 Nobel Prize in Physiology or Medicine	
Peter B. Berger	Med 1983, M.D.	Interventional cardiologist, director of Clinical Research at Geisinger Clinic	
Barouh Berkovits	POLY	Invented cardiac defibrillator and artificial cardiac pacemaker	
Fred Chasan	B.A., 1949	Owner of The Chasan Villa	
Frederick Cook	Med 1890, M.D.	Explorer	
Fred Epstein	WSC 1959, B.A.	Pediatric neurosurgeon	
Albert Warren Ferris	Med 1878, A.B.; 1885, A.M.	President of the New York State Commission in Lunacy, director of Saratoga Springs State Reservation	
Catherine Alicia Georges	STEINHARDT 1973, M.A.	Registered nurse, professor, nonprofit executive	
William Alexander Hammond	Med 1848, M.D.	Surgeon general, pioneer in neurology	
Robert Jarvik	ENG	Co-inventor, Jarvik-7 artificial heart	
Jasper H. Kane	POLY	Developed practical, deep-tank fermentation method for production of large quantities of pharmaceutical-grade penicillin	
William B. Kouwenhoven	POLY	Inventor of closed-chest cardiac defibrillator	
Joe Landolina	POLY	Invented Vetigel while an undergrad student	
Henry Lee	Med 1974–1975, M.S., Ph.D.	Forensic scientist	
Maclyn McCarty	Med 1940–1941, research fellow	Demonstrated that DNA transmits genetic traits	
Walter Reed	Med	Discovered the mosquito transmission of yellow fever	
Albert Sabin	Med 1931, M.D.	Developer of the oral vaccine for polio; president of the Weizmann Institute of Science	
Arthur M. Sackler	Med, M.D.	Founder of Creedmore Institute of Psychobiological Studies	
Jonas Salk	Med 1938, M.D.	Discoverer of the Salk vaccine (the first polio vaccine)	
Stephen Smith	Med, M.D.	Founder of the American Public Health Association	
John G. Trump	POLY	Helped design X-ray machines that provided additional years of life to cancer patients	

== Politics, law and government ==
=== United States representatives ===
Name	Relation to NYU	Notability	Reference
Jerome Anthony Ambro	B.A., 1955	U.S. House of Representatives	
William Bernard Barry	Law LL.B., 1925	U.S. House of Representatives D-NY 1935–1946	
Franklin Bartlett	Poly 1865	U.S. House of Representatives (1893–1897)	
Charles Robin Britt	Law LL.M., 1976	U.S. House of Representatives D-NC 1983–1985	
Peter Angelo Cavicchia	Law LL.B., 1908	U.S. House of Representatives R-NJ 1931–1937	
Earl Thomas Coleman	Wagner 1963, M.P.A.	U.S. House of Representatives D-MO 1976–1993	
Maurice Connolly	Law LL.B., 1898	U.S. House of Representatives D-IA 1921–1921	
Irwin Delmore Davidson	B.S., 1927, Law LL.B., 1928	U.S. House of Representatives	
Lawrence Joseph DeNardis	M.A., 1960; Ph.D., 1989	U.S. House of Representatives	
Diana DeGette	Law J.D., 1982	U.S. House of Representatives (1997–)	
Steven Boghos Derounian	B.A., 1938	U.S. House of Representatives	
Isidore Dollinger	B.C.S., 1925	U.S. House of Representatives (1949–1959)	
Fred J. Eckert	Law postgraduate work	U.S. House of Representatives, U.S. ambassador	
Francis Edwin Dorn	Wagner, 1936*	U.S. House of Representatives	
Smith Ely	Law LL.B., 1846	U.S. House of Representatives	
Leonard Farbstein	Law LL.B. 1924	U.S. House of Representatives (1957–1971)	
Hamilton Fish IV	Law LL.B. 1957	U.S. House of Representatives (1969–1995)	
Cornelius Edward Gallagher	Law postgraduate 1948	U.S. House of Representatives (1959–1973)	
Jacob A. Geissenhainer	Law LL.B., 1862	U.S. House of Representatives	
Benjamin A. Gilman	Law LL.B., 1950	U.S. House of Representatives (1983–2003)	
Anthony Jerome Griffin	Law LL.B., 1892	U.S. House of Representatives (1918–1935)	
Frank Joseph Guarini	Law, J.D., 1950, LL.M., 1955	U.S. House of Representatives (1979–1993)	
Cecil Landau Heftel	Graduate work	U.S. House of Representatives (1977–1986)	
Rush D. Holt Jr.	GSAS, M.S. 1974, Ph.D. 1981	U.S. House of Representatives (1999–)	
Mitchell Jenkins	Law 1926, LL.B.	U.S. House of Representatives	
Hakeem Jeffries	Law 1997, J.D.	U.S. House of Representatives (1997-)	
Edward Aloysius Kenney	Law LL.B. 1908	U.S. House of Representatives (1933–1938)	
Eugene James Keogh	Stern, B.S.	U.S. House of Representatives (1937–1967)	
Arthur George Klein	Law 1926, LL.B.	U.S. House of Representatives (1946–1956)	
Fiorello La Guardia	Law 1908, LL.B.,	U.S. House of Representatives (1916–1934)	
Jefferson Monroe Levy	Law 1873, LL.B.	U.S. House of Representatives (1911–1915)	
Stanley Nelson Lundine	Law 1964, LL.B.	U.S. House of Representatives (1976–1987)	
John MacCrate	Law 1906, LL.B.	U.S. House of Representatives	
Vito Marcantonio	Law, LL.B.	U.S. House of Representatives	
Raymond Joseph McGrath	M.A., 1968	U.S. House of Representatives (1981–1993)	
Allan Langdon McDermott	Law 1877, LL.B.	U.S. House of Representatives (1900–1907)	
Michael McMahon	B.A., 1979	U.S. House of Representatives	
Thomas Joseph Meskill	Law 1955, LL.B.	U.S. House of Representatives, governor of Connecticut	
Denis O'Leary	Law 1890, LL.B.	U.S. House of Representatives	
Nathan David Perlman	Law LL.B. 1907	U.S. House of Representatives (1920–1927)	
Anning Smith Prall	Law 1908, LL.B.	U.S. House of Representatives (1923–1935)	
Benjamin Rabin	Law 1917, LL.B.	U.S. House of Representatives	
Leo Frederick Rayfiel	Law 1908, LL.B.	U.S. House of Representatives	
Charles B. Rangel	Law 1957, B.S.	U.S. House of Representatives	
B. Caroll Reece	Law 1916, M.A.	U.S. House of Representatives (1921–1961)	
Matthew John Rinaldo	Wagner 1979, M.P.A.	U.S. House of Representatives (1973–1993)	
Martha Roby	B.M., 1998	U.S. House of Representatives R-AL (2011–2021)	
Benjamin Stanley Rosenthal	Law 1952, LL.M.	U.S. House of Representatives (1962–1983)	
Chris Shays	Stern 1974, M.B.A. Wagner 1978, M.P.A	U.S. House of Representatives	
Daniel Edgar Sickles	Law 1846, LL.B.	U.S. House of Representatives	
Isaac Siegel	Law 1901, LL.B.	U.S. House of Representatives	
Lawrence J. Smith		U.S. House of Representatives	
Andrew Lawrence Somers	coursework*	U.S. House of Representatives	
James Tallmadge Jr.	1st president of NYU	U.S. House of Representatives (1817–1819)	
Ludwig Teller	Law 1935, LL.B.	U.S. House of Representatives (1957–1961)	
Herbert Tenzer	Law 1927, LL.B.	U.S. House of Representatives	
Nydia Velázquez	M.A., 1976	U.S. House of Representatives (1992–)	
Elijah Ward	Law 1843, LL.B.	U.S. House of Representatives	
Arthur Vivian Watkins	1909–1910	U.S. House of Representatives	
Leo C. Zeferetti	1963*	U.S. House of Representatives	

=== United States senators ===
Name	Relation to NYU	Notability	Reference
Lamar Alexander	Law 1965, J.D.	U.S. Senate	
Rudy Boschwitz	Stern M.B.A., 1950, Law J.D., 1953	U.S. Senate	
Edward Irving Edwards	Law, LL.B.	U.S. Senate (1923–1929), governor of New Jersey	
Henry Drury Hatfield	Med M.D., 1904	U.S. Senate (1929–1935), governor of West Virginia	
Jacob Javits	CAS 1923, B.A., Law 1926, LL.B.	U.S. Senate	
Morgan Lewis	one of the founders of NYU	Governor of New York (1804–1807)	
James Edward Murray	Law 1900, J.D.	U.S. Senate (1934–1961)	
Tasker Lowndes Oddie	Law 1895, LL.B.	U.S. Senate (1921–1933)	
James Aloysius O'Gorman	Law 1887, J.D.	U.S. Senate (1911–1917)	
Bob Packwood	Law 1957, J.D.	U.S. Senate (1969–1995)	
Abraham Alexander Ribicoff	B.A., 1929	U.S. Senate (1963–1981)	
Elihu Root	Law 1867, LL.B.	U.S. Senate	
Arthur Walsh	Stern 1915	U.S. Senate	

=== United States governors ===
Name	Relation to NYU	Notability	Reference
Edward Irving Edwards	Law, LL.B.	Governor of New Jersey	
Henry Drury Hatfield	Med M.D., 1904	Governor of West Virginia	
Abraham A. Ribicoff		Governor of Connecticut	
Thomas P. Salmon		Governor of Vermont	
Chris Sununu	TSOA*	Governor of New Hampshire	
Samuel J. Tilden	Law 1838–1841	Governor of New York	

=== Ambassadors ===
Name	Relation to NYU	Notability	Reference
Clay Constantinou	Law LL.M., 1986	U.S. ambassador to Luxembourg	
Roberto de Oliveira Campos	Postgraduate study	Brazilian politician and legislator; ambassador to the U.S. and UK	
David M. Friedman	Law	U.S. ambassador to Israel	
John S.R. Shad	Law	U.S. ambassador to the Netherlands; chairman of U.S. Securities and Exchange Commission 1981–1987	
David Pressman	Law	U.S. ambassador to the United Nations	
Robert Patrick John Finn	M.A.	U.S. ambassador to Afghanistan	
Patricia McMahon Hawkins	CAS	U.S. ambassador to Togo	
Fred J. Eckert	CAS	U.S. ambassador to Fiji	
Heather M. Hodges	M.A.	U.S. ambassador to Moldova	
Clifford Sobel	Stern B.S., 1972	U.S. ambassador to the Netherlands, U.S. ambassador to Brazil	
Herbert Wolcott Bowen	POLY	U.S. ambassador to Venezuela	
George W. Landau		U.S. ambassador to Venezuela	
Ekwow Spio-Garbrah	Stern graduate studies	Ambassador to the U.S. of the Republic of Ghana; minister of communication	
Mary Carlin Yates	M.A., Ph.D.	U.S. ambassador to Ghana	
Kenneth L. Brown	M.A.	U.S. ambassador to Ghana	
Charles L. English		U.S. ambassador to Bosnia and Herzegovina	
Max Kampelman	B.A., LL.B.	U.S. ambassador to the CSCE	
Elliott Skinner	B.A.	U.S. ambassador to Burkina Faso	
William Henry Draper Jr.		U.S. ambassador to NATO	
Charles A. Heimbold Jr.		U.S. ambassador to Sweden	
Yu Tsune-chi	Sc.M. and Sc.D.	Former ambassador of the Republic of China to Italy and Spain	

=== Judges ===
Name	Relation to NYU	Notability	Reference
Shirley Abrahamson	CAS	Chief justice of the Wisconsin Supreme Court	
G. Steven Agee	Law	Federal judge on the United States Court of Appeals for the Fourth Circuit; former justice of the Supreme Court of Virginia	
Louis Freeh	Law LL.M., 1984	Judge of the U.S. District Court for the Southern District of New York; director of the Federal Bureau of Investigation (1993–2001)	
Julio M. Fuentes	GSAS M.A.	United States circuit judge on the United States Court of Appeals for the Third Circuit	
John Greaney	Law	Justice, Massachusetts Supreme Court	
Cynthia H. Hall	Law	Judge, United States Court of Appeals for the Ninth Circuit	
William C. Hill	Arts & Science, B.A, 1939; Law, J.D., 1941	Associate justice, Vermont Supreme Court	
Dennis G. Jacobs	Law	Chief judge of the United States Court of Appeals for the Second Circuit	
Judith S. Kaye	Law, LL.B., 1958	Chief judge of the New York Court of Appeals	
M. Blane Michael	Law	Circuit judge on the United States Court of Appeals for the Fourth Circuit	
Pauline Newman	Law	Judge on the United States Court of Appeals for the Federal Circuit	
William C. Brennan	Law	Justice, New York Supreme Court	
Marian P. Opala	Law LL.M.	Justice, Oklahoma Supreme Court	
Thomas Buergenthal	Law J.D., 1960	Judge, International Court of Justice (2000–)	
Doris Ling-Cohan	Law J.D., 1979	Judge, New York State Supreme Court	
William A. Wachenfeld	POLY	Justice of the New Jersey Supreme Court 1946–1959	
Nabil Elaraby	Law LL.M., 1969; J.S.D., 1971	Judge, International Court of Justice	
Gonzalo Parra Aranguren	Law LL.M., 1952	Judge, International Court of Justice	
Burton B. Roberts	B.A., 1943; Law 1949	Bronx New York Supreme Court judge known for no-nonsense imperious handling of cases in his courtroom; model for the character Myron Kovitsky in Tom Wolfe's book The Bonfire of the Vanities	
Richard V. Thomas	NYU Master of Laws	Chief justice of the Wyoming high court; member of Wyoming Supreme Court, 1974–2001	
Theodore Trautwein	Law	Judge who sentenced a reporter from The New York Times to 40 days in jail in the "Dr. X" trial of Mario Jascalevich	
James Lopez Watson	B.A., 1947	Judge, United States Court of International Trade	

=== Attorneys ===
Name	Relation to NYU	Notability	Reference
Gloria Allred	GSAS M.A., 1971	Feminist lawyer, talk show host	
David Boies	Law LL.M., 1967	United States v. Microsoft, Bush v. Gore	
Amal Clooney	Law	Barrister at Doughty Street Chambers; married to George Clooney	
Zachary W. Carter	Law	U.S. attorney for the Eastern District of New York	
Martin Garbus	Law	Attorney, Fulbright Scholar	
Bruce Givner	Law LL.M., 1977	Minor role on the evening of the Watergate burglary	
Nancy Grace	Law LL.M.	Court TV host	
Martin Lipton	Law	Lawyer; founding partner of the law firm of Wachtell, Lipton, Rosen & Katz; inventor of "poison pill"; M&A Master	
Anne Milgram	Law	57th attorney general of New Jersey	
Shirley D. Peterson	Law	Assistant attorney general in Tax Division of United States Department of Justice	
Irving Picard	Law	Oversaw Madoff recoupment	
Charles P. Rettig	Law (LL.M.)	Lawyer	
Glenn Greenwald	Law	Lawyer and blogger	
Ann Althouse	Law	Lawyer and blogger	
Neil Barofsky	Law	Assistant U.S. attorney for the Southern District of New York 2000–2008	
Marc Platt (producer)	Law	Entertainment attorney; film, television, and theatre producer	
Bob Ferguson (politician)	Law	Attorney and politician; 18th and current attorney general of Washington	
Vinoo Varghese	CAS B.A., 1996	White collar criminal defense attorney; legal commentator; former prosecutor; founder of Varghese & Associates, P.C.	

=== United States cabinet members, foreign government, royalty, and other ===
Name	Relation to NYU	Notability	Reference
Alessandra Biaggi	Steinhardt B.A., 2008	New York state senator	
Cristina Federica de Borbon	GSAS M.A., 1991	Princess of Spain	
Elmer Ellsworth Brown		U.S. commissioner of education, fellow of the American Academy of Arts and Sciences	
Richard Campagna	M.A.	Libertarian Party vice presidential candidate	
Sripati Chandrasekhar	GSAS Ph.D., 1944	Indian minister of Health and Family Planning under Indira Gandhi	
Dae-whan Chang	GSAS Ph.D., 1987, M.A., 1985	Prime minister, South Korea	
Humayun Chaudhry		Physician; CEO of the Federation of State Medical Boards	
Li-an Chen	GSAS Ph.D.	Secretary of defence, Taiwan (1990–1993), president of the Control Yuan	
Demos Chiang	Stern B.S.	Great-grandson of Chiang Kai-shek	
Eugene Chien	GSAS Ph.D., 1973	Foreign minister of Taiwan	
Chelsea Clinton	Wagner Ph.D. student, 2010–	First Daughter; child of Bill Clinton and Hillary Clinton	
George Cromwell	POLY	New York state senator	
Arthur B. Culvahouse Jr.	Law	White House counsel, 1987–89	
Stavros Dimas	GSAS M.A., 1969	European commissioner for the Environment	
William Henry Draper Jr.	GSAS M.A., 1917	Under secretary of war and the Army	
Juan Carlos Echeverry	GSAS Ph.D., 1996	Finance minister of Colombia	
Mark Everson	GSAS M.S., 1977	U.S. commissioner of Internal Revenue	
Carmen Fariña		New York City Schools chancellor, head of New York City Department of Education	
Anthony Foxx	Law	United States secretary of transportation; mayor of Charlotte, North Carolina, 2009–2013	
Rudy Giuliani	Law J.D., 1968	Mayor of New York City (1994–2001)	
Jason Greenblatt	Law	US special representative for International Negotiations	
Vanita Gupta	Law	Head of Civil Rights Division at United States Department of Justice	
Isaac Herzog		Israeli politician; chairman of the Labor Party; opposition leader in the 19th Knesset	
Khara Jabola-Carolus		Executive director of Hawaii State Commission on the Status of Women	
Ephraim Katzir	POLY	Fourth president of Israel; chief scientist of Israel Defense Department	
Ed Koch	Law	Mayor of New York City	
Micah Lasher	College of Arts and Science (CAS) B.A., 2003	New York State Assemblyman	
Henry Lee (forensic scientist)	GSAS	Commissioner of Connecticut Department of Public Safety	
Samuel Levy	University of the City of New York 1894, B.S.	Manhattan borough president (1931–1937)	
Hun Manet	MA	Prime minister of Cambodia	
Shamma Al Mazrui		UAE minister of state for youth	
Chi Mui	POLY	First Asian-American mayor of San Gabriel, California	
Callistus Ndlovu	M.A., 1969	Zimbabwean member of parliament and cabinet minister	
Vincent O'Rourke	POLY	Commanding officer of a number of aviation units and USS Rainier (AE-5) and USS Tripoli (LPH-10); two-time recipient of the Navy Cross, the Navy's second highest award for valor	
Maria Olympia		Princess of Greece and Denmark	
Frank Padavan	POLY	New York state senator	
Giorgos Papakonstantinou	Stern	Minister of Economy & Finance, Greece	
Teresa Patterson Hughes	Steinhardt	California state senator	
Shimon Peres		President of Israel 2007–2014; served twice as prime minister of Israel	
Samuel Pierce	Law LL.M., 1952	US secretary of Housing and Urban Development	
Rafael Piñeiro	Wagner MPA	First deputy commissioner of New York City Police Department	
Leonard M. Pomata	POLY B.S.	5th secretary of technology of Virginia	
Shlomo-Yisrael Ben-Meir		Israeli politician; served as a member of the Knesset, deputy minister of Internal Affairs, deputy speaker and deputy minister of Health	
Carl Gatto	POLY	Member of Alaska House of Representatives	
Fortunato de la Peña	POLY	Secretary of Science and Technology at Philippine Department of Science and Technology; chairman of United Nations Commission on Science and Technology for Development	
Chung Sye-kyun	Wagner M.A., 1983	Speaker of the National Assembly of South Korea	
George T. Burling	POLY	New York state senator	
Ivan Itkin	POLY	Member of Pennsylvania House of Representatives	
Bill de Blasio		Mayor of New York City	
Maya Soetoro-Ng		Sister of US President Barack Obama; professor at University of Hawaii at Manoa	
Inonge Mbikusita-Lewanika	Steinhardt	Ambassador of the Republic of Zambia to the U.S.	
Lamar Alexander	Law 1965, J.D.	United States secretary of education, U.S. senator from Tennessee	
Ruth Balser	Ph.D.	Member of Massachusetts House of Representatives (1998–present)	
Bill Bell		Mayor of Durham, North Carolina	
Michael Benjamin	B.A., 1992	U.S. Senate candidate	
Ali Khatami	POLY	Chief of staff of Iran; brother of former Iranian President Mohammed Khatami	
Phil Amicone	ENG	41st mayor of Yonkers, New York	
Sal Albanese	Steinhardt	New York City Council member	
Mohamed ElBaradei	Law LL.M., 1967	Vice president of Egypt; director general of the International Atomic Energy Agency (1997–)	
Neil Barofsky	Law	SIGTARP, special United States Treasury Department inspector general overseeing the Troubled Assets Relief Program, 2008–2011	
Guillermo Endara Galimany	Postgraduate work, NYU Law	President of Panama (1989–1994)	
John William Gilbert	GSAS	Secretary of state for transport and defence	
Camillo Gonsalves	BsC in Global Affairs	Permanent representative of Saint Vincent and the Grenadines to the United Nations (2007– )	
John Grenier	Taxation, L.LM, 1955	U.S. Senate candidate, 1966; Alabama Republican Party chairman; Birmingham lawyer	
Seth Harris	Law, J.D., 1990	U.S. Department of Labor, deputy secretary of labor, 2009–; counselor to the secretary, 1993–2000	
Muhammad Hassanein	GSAS M.A., 1966	Minister of finance, Arab Republic of Egypt	
Lazarus Joseph	LAW 1912	NY state senator (21st District 1934–44, 24th District 1945) and comptroller of the City of New York (1946–1954)	
Meir Kahane	GSAS M.A., 1957	Leader of the Kach political party in the Israeli Knesset	
Raymond W. Kelly	Law LL.M.	Police commissioner of New York, under secretary of the Treasury	
John F. Kennedy Jr.	Law J.D., 1989	Son of President John F. Kennedy	
Fiorello La Guardia	Law 1908, LL.B.	Mayor of New York City (1934–1945)	
Ying-jeou Ma	Law LL.M., 1976	President of the Republic of China (Taiwan)	
Marie-Chantal Miller	IFA	Princess of Greece	
Robert Mueller	GSAS M.A. 1967	Director of the Federal Bureau of Investigation under George W. Bush	
Louis Romano	Ed.D.	Member of New Jersey General Assembly	
Vaughn Stewart	Law J.D., 2014	Member of Maryland House of Delegates	
Queen Sylvia of Buganda	Bachelor of Arts (B.A.) degree 1985	Queen consort of Buganda, the traditional kingdom in central Uganda	
Abraham Alexander Ribicoff	B.A., 1929	U.S. secretary of health, education, and welfare	
Elihu Root	Law 1867, LL.B.	Secretary of war (1899–1903), secretary of state (1905–1909)	
Jessica Rosenworcel	Law 1997, J.D.	Chairwoman of Federal Communications Commission (2021–)	
Rodney Vandergert	NYU Master of Laws	Permanent secretary of Ministry of Foreign Affairs of Sri Lanka	
Ernst Joseph Walch	Law M.C.J., 1981	Minister of Foreign Affairs for Liechtenstein	
John White	Master's degree in public administration	Louisiana State superintendent of education, 2012–	
Barbara Wright	M.A., Nursing Education	Member of New Jersey General Assembly	
Ahmed Zaki Yamani	Law	Saudi Arabian politician; minister of Oil (Petroleum) and Mineral Resources 1962–1986; minister in OPEC for 25 years	

=== Activists and advocates ===
Name	Relation to NYU	Notability	Reference
Carol Bellamy	Law J.D., 1968	Executive director of UNICEF	
Abraham Foxman	Law J.D.	President of Anti-Defamation League	
Dorothy Height	ARTS B.A., GSAS M.A., 1930	Civil and women's rights activist	
T. J. Jemison	Postgraduate study	President of National Baptist Convention 1982–1994	
Ivan Lozowy	Law 1986, J.D.	Founder of Institute for Statehood and Democracy of Ukraine	
Anne Firth Murray	GSAS Economics	Founder of Global Fund for Women	
Adam Shapiro	GSAS M.A	Co-founder of International Solidarity Movement	
Harry Sisson	Student	Social media influencer	
Martha J Somerman	D.D.S. (NYU College of Dentistry, 1975), Ph.D.	Director, National Institute of Dental and Craniofacial Research	
Park Yong Sung	Stern M.B.A.	Chairman, International Chamber of Commerce	
Karen Washington	Master's degree in occupational biomechanics, 1981	Political activist and community organizer fighting for food justice	
Vanessa Wruble	M.P.S. Interactive Telecommunications	Activist, co-founder of The Women's March on Washington	
Jan Zaprudnik		Leader of the Belarusian community in the U.S.	

== Religion ==
Name	Relation to NYU	Notability	Reference
J. David Bleich		Rabbi and authority on Jewish law and ethics	
William Donohue	GSAS Ph.D., 1980	President, Catholic League	
D. James Kennedy	GSAS	Pastor, evangelist, and Christian broadcaster; founded Coral Ridge Presbyterian Church, Evangelism Explosion International, Westminster Academy, and Knox Theological Seminary	
Sang Whang	POLY	Church leader and community advocate in Florida	
Ted N. C. Wilson	New York University Department of Religious Studies	President of General Conference of Seventh-day Adventist Church	

== Press, literature, and arts ==
Name	Relation to NYU	Notability	Reference
Kathy Acker		Author of Blood and Guts in High School	
James Truslow Adams	POLY, 1898	Writer and historian; coined the term "American Dream" in his 1931 book The Epic of America	
Warren Adler	B.A., 1949	Author of War of the Roses and Random Hearts	
Kenny Albert	CAS 1990, B.A.	Play-by-play broadcaster, New York Rangers and Fox Sports	
David Antin	GSAS 1966, M.A.	Recipient of PEN Los Angeles Award for Poetry	
Kelli Arena	TSOA 1985 B.F.A.	CNN reporter and anchor 1985–2009	
Ann Shoket	1994, B.A.	Editor in chief of Seventeen	
Jacob M. Appel	GSAS 2000, M.F.A.	Author of Arborophilia, Creve Coeur; idiosyncratic bioethicist	
Ted Baehr	Law, J.D.	Chairman of Christian Film and Television Commission	
Desiree C. Bailey	GSAS 2022, M.F.A.	Poet, winner of Yale Younger Poets Prize	
Maria Bartiromo	CAS, 1987 B.A.	News anchor on CNBC; author	
Venia Bechrakis	M.F.A	Artist	
Katherine Behar	2006, M.A	Artist	
Leigh Behnke	1976, M.F.A	Artist	
Ib Benoh	Steinhardt 1993, D.A.	Artist	
Barbara Bloemink	M.F.A. Fine and Decorative Arts	Author, art historian	
Judy Blume	1961 B.S., Education	Writer of children's literature and young adult fiction	
Stacey Bradford	M.A., Journalism	Financial journalist, author, and commentator	
Rita Mae Brown	Law 1964, M.A.	Rubyfruit Jungle	
Eileen Rose Busby	Earned B.A. at age 62	Author	
Candace Bushnell	CAS, B.A.	Wrote New York Observer column, the basis for Sex and the City	
Elaine Cameron-Weir	2010, MFA	Artist	
Bliss Carman	Visiting scholar	Canadian poet	
Corrine Grad Coleman	M.A.	Women's liberation activist, co-founder of Redstockings	
Suzanne Collins	TSOA 1989, M.F.A.	Television writer and novelist, author of The Underland Chronicles and The Hunger Games trilogy	
Howard Cosell	CAS, B.A.	Sports journalist	
Countee Cullen	CAS, 1925, B.A.	Author of Ballad of the Brown Girl, Color, Color	
Noon Meem Danish	Former teaching staff	Urdu poet	
Miriam Davenport	IFA*	Painter and sculptor	
Midge Decter	ARTS*	Journalist	
Nieves Zuberbühler		Journalist	
Erica De Mane	CAS	Author of The Flavors of Southern Italy	
Heather Dewey-Hagborg	Master of Professional Studies in Interactive Telecommunications	Information artist	
Crystal Eastman	Law 1907, LL.B.	Leader in early 20th-century feminist and civil liberties activism	
Stephen Edlich	Fine Arts 1967	Artist, known for collage, sculpture, prints	
Ralph Ellison	Faculty 1970–1980	American Academy of Arts & Letters	
Warren Farrell	PhD Political Science 1974	Educator, gender equality activist, author of seven books including The Myth of Male Power	
Wayne Federman	TSOA*	Author of Maravich; comedian, The Tonight Show	
Tom Ford	TSOA*	Design director for Gucci	
William Gaines	CAS 1948, B.A.	Founder of MAD magazine	
Michael Gartner	Law 1972, J.D.	1997 Pulitzer Prize for Editorial Writing	
Elizabeth Gilbert	CAS B.A., 1991	Author of Eat, Pray, Love	
Jorie Graham	TSOA 1973, B.F.A.	Known for complex metaphors and philosophical content	
Adolph Green	WSC 1938*	Met Betty Comden at NYU	
Pam Grossman	2003, B.A.	Author, curator, and teacher of magical practice and history	
Saskia Hamilton	M.A. in English and creative writing, 1991	Poet and scholar of Robert Lowell	
Raymond P. Hammond	GAL 2000, MA	Editor-in-chief of New York Quarterly	
Sean Hannity	coursework*	Co-host of Hannity and Colmes on Fox News Channel	
Joseph Heller	WSC 1948	Author of Catch-22	
Perez Hilton	B.A., 2000	Blogger, columnist and television personality	
Safiya Henderson-Holmes	B.A.	Poet, recipient of William Carlos Williams Award	
Don Hewitt	coursework*	Creator of 60 Minutes	
Kathy Iandoli	M.A.	Journalist and author	
Idil Ibrahim		Director and producer; founder of Zeila Films	
Percy Costa Ifill	B.S. 1939, architecture	Architect	
Andrew Jacobs	Studied architecture, urban design	New York Times journalist; documentary film director and producer	
Jamie Johnson	GAL 2003, B.A.	Filmmaker	
David Kaufman	GSAS, M.A.	Contributor to Financial Times, The New York Times, Details, and Fox Business Network	
Swati Khurana	GAL 2001, M.A.	Artist and writer	
Alen Pol Kobryn	CAS*	Poet	
Sally Kohn	Law	Contributor to Fox News Channel	
William Lashner	Law, J.D.	Author of legal thrillers	
Ira Levin	ARTS 1950, B.A.	Known for Broadway musical Deathtrap	
Paul Levinson	WSC 1974 B.A.; Steinhardt 1979 Ph.D.	Author of The Plot To Save Socrates	
Charles Battell Loomis	POLY	Author	
Robert Wood Lynn	GSAS 2023, M.F.A.	Poet, winner of Yale Younger Poets Prize	
Leonard Maltin	WSC, B.A. (journalism)	Film critic, Entertainment Tonight	
Demetri Martin	Law*	Comedian, The Daily Show	
Carson McCullers	GSAS*	Author of The Heart is a Lonely Hunter	
Frank McCourt	WSC 1953, B.A.	1997 Pulitzer Prize for Autobiography or autobiographical Writing	
Leonard Michaels	WSC 1953, B.A.	Essayist known for compelling urban tales of whimsy and tragedy	
Joyce Miller	New York University Tisch School of the Arts	Almost Rapist: A True Crime Memoir	
Janet Mock	Arthur L. Carter Journalism Institute, M.A.	Author and journalist known for 2014 memoir Redefining Realness	
Davi Napoleon	TSOA 1989 Ph.D.	Arts journalist and reviewer; author of Chelsea on the Edge: The Adventures of an American Theater	
Samira Nasr	M.A. (journalism)	Editor-in-chief of Harper's Bazaar	
Daniel Nayeri	Studied writing	Author of Everything Sad Is Untrue	
Alex Pareene		Editor-in-chief of Gawker	
William Phillips	GSAS 1930, M.A.	Co-founder of Partisan Review	
James Amos Porter	GSAS, M.A.	Painter and art historian	
Dorothy Rabinowitz	GSAS 1960, Ph.D.	2001 Pulitzer Prize for Commentary	
Carole Radziwill	Stern	Journalist, author, and television personality	
Herman Raucher	WSC, B.A.	Author and screenwriter, Summer of '42, Ode to Billy Joe	
Charles Reznikoff	Law 1916, LL.B.	Objectivist poet	
Charlie Rose	Stern 1968, coursework*	Emmy Award-winning journalist, television producer, host of PBS's Charlie Rose Show, and correspondent for CBS's 60 Minutes	
J. D. Salinger	coursework*	Author of Catcher in the Rye.	
Gerald Schoenfeld	Law, J.D.	Chairman of Shubert Organization (1972–2008)	
Ben Shahn		Artist	
John Patrick Shanley	Steinhardt 1977, M.A.	Recipient of Pulitzer Prize, Academy Award, Tony Award	
Arleen Schloss	Education 1965, B.S.	Sound poet, performance and video artist, curator, early childhood educator	
Sara Shepard	ARTS*	Author of Pretty Little Liars series and The Lying Game series	
George Segal	ENG 1950, B.S.	Sculptor of monochromatic, cast plaster figures	
Robert Sobel	CAS 1957, Ph.D.	Business historiographer; author of For Want of a Nail	
Danielle Steel	TSOA 1963–1967*	Romance novel author	
Darin Strauss	ENG 1996, M.F.A.	Guggenheim-winning novelist; Chang and Eng, The Real McCoy	
Harold C. Schonberg	GSAS 1939, M.A.	1971 Pulitzer Prize for Criticism	
Beth Ames Swartz	1959, M.A.	Artist	
John Paul Thomas	GSAS 1954, M.A.	Artist and educator; studied with William Baziotes	
Amy Vanderbilt	B.A. 1929	Authority on manners, mores	
Brian K. Vaughan		Y: The Last Man, Ex Machina, Pride of Baghdad	
Joel Wachs		Los Angeles City Council member (1970–2001), president of Andy Warhol Foundation for the Visual Arts in New York City	
Gene Weingarten	CAS 1972	2008 and 2010 Pulitzer Prize for Feature Writing	
Saul Williams	GSAS 1995, M.A.	Author of The Seventh Octave and Said the Shotgun to the Head	
Robert Anton Wilson	1957–1958	Author of The Illuminatus! Trilogy	
James N. Wood		Former director and president of Art Institute of Chicago (1980–2004); president and CEO of J. Paul Getty Trust	
Yanyi	GSAS 2020, M.F.A.	Poet, winner of Yale Younger Poets Prize	
Gary Schwartz	WSC 1961, B.A.	Art historian	
Joel Shatzky		Writer and literary professor	
Stephanie Stebich	IFA M.A.	Art historian	
Edgar Peters Bowron	IFA 1969, M.A., 1979, Ph.D.	Art historian	
Alix Strauss		Author	

=== Pulitizer Prize winners ===
Name	Relation to NYU	Notability	Reference
James Truslow Adams	POLY	1921 Pulitzer Prize for History	
Milton Babbitt	ARTS 1935, B.A.	1982 Pulitzer Prize, Special Citation, "for his life's work as a distinguished and seminal American composer"	
Jorie Graham	Undergraduate/Film	1996 Pulitzer Prize for Poetry	
Michael Gartner	Law 1972, J.D.	2001 Pulitzer Prize for Editorial Writing	
Morton Gould	CAS, studied under Abby Whiteside	1995 Pulitzer Prize for Stringmusic	
Galway Kinnell	Professor	1982 Pulitzer Prize for Poetry	
Frank McCourt	CAS 1953, B.A.	1997 Pulitzer Prize for Autobiography or Autobiographical Writing	
George Perle	GSAS 1956, Ph.D.	1986 Pulitzer Prize for Woodwind Quintet No. 4	
Dorothy Rabinowitz	GSAS 1960, Ph.D.	2001 Pulitzer Prize for Commentary	
James Ford Rhodes	CAS, 1865– *	1916 Pulitzer Prize for History of the Civil War	
Harold C. Schonberg	GSAS 1939, M.A.	1971 Pulitzer Prize for Criticism	
William Schuman	Stern*	1943 Pulitzer Prize for A Free Song	
John Patrick Shanley	Steinhardt 1977, M.A.	2005 Pulitzer Prize for Drama	
Charles Simic	CAS 1966, B.A.	1990 Pulitzer Prize for Poetry (The World Doesn't End)	
Neil Simon	CAS 1944–1945*	1991 Pulitzer Prize for Drama (Lost in Yonkers)	
Moneta Sleet Jr.	Master's in journalism	1969 Pulitzer Prize for Feature Photography (photo of grieving widow Coretta Scott King)	
Irwin Unger	Professor	1965 Pulitzer Prize for History (The Greenback Era)	
Gene Weingarten	CAS 1968–1972	2008, 2010 Pulitzer Prize for Feature Writing	
Doug Wright	TSOA 1987	2004 Pulitzer Prize for Drama	
Lawrence Wright	fellow, Center for Law and Security	2007 Pulitzer Prize for General Nonfiction	

== Sports ==
As of 2013, NYU has been associated with at least 74 men and 10 women who have participated as athletes, coaches, or managers at Olympic Games, for a total of at least 28 Olympic medals.

Name	Relation to NYU	Notability	Reference
Nada Al-Bedwawi		Swimmer; competed at the 2016 Summer Olympics	
Bob Arum	CAS, B.A.	Founder and CEO of Top Rank, one of the most successful professional boxing promotion companies in boxing history	
Anjelina Belakovskaia	GSAS 2001, M.S.	U.S. Women's Chess Champion 1995, 1996, 1999	
Moe Berg	ARTS 1918–1919*	Major League baseball player, spy, quiz show host	
Gary Bettman	Law 1977, J.D.	NHL commissioner	
Chuck Blazer	Stern, B.S.	FIFA Executive Committee member 1996–2013; CONCACAF general secretary 1990–2011; executive vice president of U.S. Soccer Federation	
Cy Block		MLB player, Chicago Cubs 1942–1946	
Georgina Bloomberg		Professional equestrian; daughter of former New York City mayor and billionaire Michael Bloomberg	
Ralph Branca	Steinhardt	Professional baseball pitcher who played 12 seasons in Major League Baseball (1944–1956); played for the Brooklyn Dodgers (1944–53, 1956), Detroit Tigers (1953–54), and New York Yankees (1954); three-time All-Star; in 1951, he allowed a walk-off home run to Bobby Thomson, known as the "Shot Heard 'Round the World"	
Howard Cann	ENG	Olympic shot putter	
Tedford H. Cann	Stern	Champion swimmer; recipient of the United States military's highest decoration, the Medal of Honor; world record holder in swimming; Olympian	
Ben Carnevale		NYU basketball player 1934–1938; Navy basketball coach 1947–1967	
Colin Cassady	CAS	Professional wrestler signed to AEW, performs under ring name "Big Bill"; formerly signed to Impact Wrestling and WWE	
Herbert Cohen	1962	Olympic fencer	
Rudy D'Amico		NBA basketball scout, former college and professional basketball coach	
Martin Jay Davis		Olympic fencer	
Phil Edwards		Won three bronze Olympic medals	
Spencer Freedman		College basketball player for the Harvard Crimson and NYU Violets	
Eugene Glazer	1962	Olympic fencer	
Hank Greenberg	coursework*	Major League baseball player; five-time All-Star; two-time American League MVP; elected to Hall of Fame	
Gary Gubner		World record-holding shotputter and Olympic weightlifter	
Happy Hairston		NBA player, 1971 champion with Los Angeles Lakers	
Carol Heiss	CAS	Gold medal winner, Olympic Winter Games 1960	
Nat Holman		Hall of Fame basketball player and coach	
Jay Horwitz		New York Mets executive	
Samuel Jones		Olympic gold medalist, high jump, 1904	
Julia Jones-Pugliese		National champion fencer and fencing coach	
Barry Kramer		Pro basketball player and jurist	
Martin Lang	1972	Olympic fencer	
Norman Lewis		Olympic fencer	
William H. Maddren	POLY, B.S.	Head coach of Johns Hopkins University lacrosse team	
Edith Master		Olympic bronze medalist equestrian	
Shep Messing		Olympic soccer player and broadcaster	
Marvin Miller	CAS, B.S.	Executive director of Major League Baseball Players Association 1966–1982	
Irv Mondschein		Olympic decathlete and three-time U.S. champion, NCAA high-jump champion, and All-East football player	
William Morrissey	Stern, B.S.	Professional wrestler known as Big Cass in WWE and W. Morrissey in Impact Wrestling	
Boris Nachamkin		NBA basketball player	
Reggie Pearman	Steinhardt	Middle-distance runner; competed in 1952 Summer Olympics	
April Jeanette Mendez	TSOA*	Professional wrestler under the name "AJ Lee"; three-time WWE Divas Champion	
Colette Nelson	PhD 1998, M.S.	IFBB professional bodybuilder	
Satch Sanders		NBA player, 1961–1966; champion with Boston Celtics, 1968–1969	
Mika'il Sankofa	CAS, 1988	Olympic gold medalist, fencing, 1988, 1992	
Ollie Satenstein		NFL player	
Dolph Schayes		NBA player, 3-time FT% leader, 1-time rebound leader, 12-time All-Star, Hall of Fame, and coach	
Babe Scheuer		NFL player	
Robert Shmalo	CAS	International ice dancing competitor	
Ed Smith	1934	NFL Boston Redskins, Green Bay Packers 1936–1937, model for Heisman Trophy	
Moe Spahn		American Basketball League (MVP)	
Ken Strong	All-American, 1928	NFL Staten Island Stapletons, New York Giants 1929–1947, Pro Football Hall of Fame 1967	
Paul Tagliabue	Law 1965, J.D.	NFL commissioner	
Bill Tanguay		NFL player	
Sidney Tannenbaum		Two-time All-American basketball guard; left as NYU all-time scorer; pro player	
Mary Washburn	CAS	Competed for U.S. in the 1928 Summer Olympics held in Amsterdam, Netherlands in the 4 x 100 metres; won silver medal	
Peter Westbrook	Stern	Former sabre fencing champion and Olympic medalist	
Hans Wieselgren		Olympic fencer	
Ruth White		Olympic fencer	
John Woodruff	GSAS 1941, M.A.	Olympic gold medalist, 800 m, 1936	
Eddie Yost		MLB player for Washington Senators, Detroit Tigers, LA Angels 1944–1962; All Star Team 1952; coach of Washington Senators, NY Mets, Boston Red Sox 1962–1985	
Peter Zaremba	ENG	Competed for U.S. in the 1932 Summer Olympics held in Los Angeles, in the hammer throw; won bronze medal	

- Norman Armitage (1907, as Norman Cudworth Cohn–1972), patent lawyer, chemical engineer Olympic saber fencer who competed in six Olympics and won a bronze team medal
- Benjamin Auerbach (1919–1993), professional basketball player
- Daniel Bukantz (1917–2008), four-time individual US national foil fencing champion, Maccabiah Games foil champion, 4x Olympic fencer
- Abram Cohen (1924–2016), Olympic foil, épée, and sabre fencer
- Boris Djerassi (born 1952), Israeli-born athletei, hammer-thrower, and strongman
- Ralph Kaplowitz (1919–2009), professional basketball player
- Jane Katz (born 1943), educator, author, and world-class former Olympic competitive and long-distance swimmer
- Louis Silver (born 1953), American-Israeli businessman, attorney, and former professional basketball player
- Steve Turner (born 1946), professional tennis player, ranked # 105 in the world, and tennis coach

== Other ==
Name	Relation to NYU	Notability	Reference
Sir Harold Acton	Major benefactor	Donated Villa LaPietra Campus to NYU	
Elmer Holmes Bobst	Major benefactor	Namesake of NYU's Elmer Holmes Bobst Library	
Charles Butler	President of council		
Adela Cojab	NYU alum, sued NYU	Author and activist against antisemitism for Zionist causes	
Albert Gallatin	Founder of NYU	Secretary of the Treasury under Thomas Jefferson	
Martin Kimmel	Major benefactor	Namesake of NYU's Kimmel Center for Student Life	
Ruth Madoff	NYU alum	Widow of Bernie Madoff	
Miles Redd	NYU alum	Interior designer	
Howard Spira	NYU alum	Gambler and felon	
Michael Steinhardt	Major benefactor	Namesake of NYU's Steinhardt School of Culture, Education, and Human Development	
Leonard N. Stern	Major benefactor	Namesake of NYU's Stern School of Business	
Preston Tisch	Major benefactor	Namesake of NYU's Tisch School of the Arts	
Donald Wallance	CAS 1930, B.A.	Industrial designer	
Oscar Lawton Wilkerson	NYU alum	Tuskegee Airman	

=== Fictional ===
The following are characters in film, television, literature, and other media that have a connection to the university:

Name	Portrayal	Notability	Reference
Blair Waldorf	played by Leighton Meester	in Gossip Girl	
Dan Humphrey	played by Penn Badgley	in Gossip Girl	
Vanessa Abrams	played by Jessica Szohr	in Gossip Girl	
Georgina Sparks	played by Michelle Trachtenberg	in Gossip Girl	
Ross Geller, professor of paleontology	played by David Schwimmer	in the TV show Friends	
Fritz the Cat	voiced by Skip Hinnant	in the film directed by Ralph Bakshi	
Will Truman	played by Eric McCormack	in Will and Grace	
Grace Adler	played by Debra Messing	in Will and Grace	
Jonathan Byers	played by Charlie Heaton	in Stranger Things	
Ilana Wexler	played by Ilana Glazer	in Broad City	

== See also ==
- Category:New York University alumni
- List of NYU College of Arts and Science people
- List of NYU Stern people
- List of NYU Tandon School of Engineering people
- List of NYU Courant Institute people
- List of NYU GSAS people
- List of NYU Law School people
- List of NYU School of Medicine people
- List of NYU Tisch School of the Arts people
- List of NYU Gallatin people
- List of NYU Steinhardt people
- List of New York University honorary degree recipients
- List of New York University faculty
