= New York University Graduate School of Arts and Science =

Coordinates: 40.73140°N 73.99649°W

- Established: 1886
- Location: New York, USA
- Website: gsas.nyu.edu

The New York University Graduate School of Arts and Science (GSAS) is a graduate school at New York University (NYU).

== Academics ==
There are approximately 1,600 Ph.D. students and 3,000 master's students enrolled in the Graduate School. Students hail from more than 200 undergraduate institutions, all fifty states, and from more than 100 other countries. GSAS has one of the largest and most diverse international student populations in the United States. International students represent between 40% and 45% of the student body. GSAS offers 48 programs and many interdisciplinary and advanced degrees, including doctorates, master's, and certificates.

The following Departments and Programs are offered:

- Africana Studies
- Asian/Pacific/American Studies
- Anthropology
- Basic Medical Sciences
- Biology
- Biomaterial
- Biomedical Sciences
- Chemistry
- Cinema Studies
- Classics
- Comparative Literature
- Computer Science
- Creative Writing
- East Asian Studies
- Economics
- English
- Environmental Health Sciences
- Ergonomics and Biomechanics
- European and Mediterranean Studies
- Fine Arts
- French
- French Studies
- German
- Hebrew and Judaic Studies
- History
- Historical & Sustainable Architecture
- International Relations
- Irish and Irish American Studies
- Italian Studies
- John W. Draper Interdisciplinary Master's Program in Humanities and Social Thought
- Journalism
- Latin American and Caribbean Studies
- Law and Society
- Linguistics
- Mathematics
- Middle Eastern and Islamic Studies
- Museum Studies
- Music
- Near Eastern Studies
- Neural Science
- Performance Studies
- Philosophy
- Physics
- Poetics and Theory
- Politics
- Psychology
- Psychotherapy Psychotherapy and Psychoanalysis, Postdoctoral Program
- Religious Studies
- Russian and Slavic Studies
- Sociology
- Spanish and Portuguese

=== Inter-University Doctoral Consortium ===
Along with the Steinhardt School of Culture, Education, and Human Development and the New York University Institute of Fine Arts, the Graduate School participates in the Inter-University Doctoral Consortium (IUDC), which allows doctoral students to cross-register at member institutions. Participating schools are CUNY Graduate Center, Fordham University, New School for Social Research, Columbia University, Princeton University, Rutgers University, and Stony Brook University.

== Notable alumni ==
For a list of notable Alumni and Professors of the NYU Graduate School of Arts and Sciences, see List of NYU GSAS people. See also List of New York University people.
