= Bill Friend (engineer) =

William Friend was the former president of Bechtel. He also served as chairman of University of California’s President's Council, treasurer of the National Academy of Engineering, and chairman of the National Action Council for Minorities in Engineering among others. He graduated from the Brooklyn Collegiate and Polytechnic Institute (which would later be known as New York University Tandon School of Engineering) as a chemical engineer. Bill died due to complications arising from COVID-19 in January 2021.
