= Michael H. Kappaz =

Michael H. Kappaz (died January 27, 2013) was the Chairman and CEO of K&M Engineering and Consulting. He was also a vice president at Bechtel. He earned a B.S. in Industrial Engineering from Polytechnic University in Brooklyn and an MBA from Golden Gate University in San Francisco. He completed post-graduate work at Stanford University and the Wharton School of the University of Pennsylvania.
