= Jules Bellisio =

American engineer

- Born: Jules Angelo Bellisio; 1941 (age 84–85); Brooklyn, New York, U.S.
- Occupation: Electrical Engineer
- Years active: 1962 — present
- Website: http://www.bellisio.com/

Jules A. Bellisio is the Principal of his own consulting practice, Telemediators, LLC. Previously, he was Chief Scientist and Executive Director of Emerging Networks Research at Telcordia Technologies, where he remains a Telcordia Fellow. Currently, he consults on the system and physical layer aspects of digital communications and related emerging technologies with a focus on mobility and wireless.

Dr. Jules A. Bellisio started his lifetime electrical engineering career at Bell Telephone Laboratories. At Bell System divestiture he transferred to Bellcore (later renamed Telcordia, then Ericsson) to establish the Digital Signal Processing Research Division. He retired as Executive Director of Emerging Networks Research, Chief Scientist, and Fellow of the Corporation. Following retirement, he was the Principal of his own consulting practice, Telemediators LLC.

Bellisio was born in Brooklyn, New York, received the B.S.E.E. degree from the Polytechnic Institute of Brooklyn, the S.M.E.E. degree from the Massachusetts Institute of Technology, and was awarded the Ph.D. from Yale University. He is the originator (US Patents) of the "sliding payload" concept central to SONET/SDH transmission systems, invented the phase-frequency locked timing extractor widely used in baseband digital repeaters, and was the designer and managing engineer of the digital television lightwave system used for virtually all of the worldwide contribution quality TV feeds at the 1984 Olympic Games, the first compressed digital TV system ever accepted by a prime TV network for program contribution. Bellisio and his staff were the original advocates of Broadband/ATM standardization, HDTV, and video compression. They were the first to propose the ADSL (Asymmetrical digital subscriber line). All of these innovations have developed into massive worldwide profitable industries.

Dr. Bellisio is a Telcordia Fellow, a Fellow of the IEEE (Institute of Electrical and Electronics Engineers) for contributions to and leadership in the conception and realization of digital television systems for current and emerging telecommunications networks, a member of the Society of Motion Picture and Television Engineers (SMPTE), and a member of the Internet Society. He was the President and Chairman of the Board of DAVIC (the Digital Audio Visual Council), and is currently Executive Director of the Federal Communications Commission Technological Advisory Council (FCC TAC). He is also a member of the National Academy of Sciences Intelligent Transportation Systems Standards Review Committee, the ATSC (Advanced Television Systems Committee), the Software Defined Radio Forum, and the TV-Anytime Forum.
