= List of New York University honorary degree recipients =

Honorary degree recipients of New York University are typically individuals of great distinction or achievement who are nationally or internationally prominent in their subject areas or disciplines and reflect the values of NYU. Overall, the group of honorees varies in their fields of endeavor, and is diverse in ethnicity, race, background, and gender. Recipients honored in recent years include the following:

- Louise Bourgeois, artist
- David Brooks, columnist for the New York Times
- Emmanuelle Charpentier, scientist and visiting professor at Umeå University
- Bill Clinton, 42nd president of the United States
- Billy Crystal, comedian, actor, producer, writer, director, and 1970 alumnus of the Tisch School of the Arts
- Patrick Desbois, president, Yahad-In Unum
- Aretha Franklin, singer
- Claire Marie Fraser, genomicist
- Lang Lang, pianist
- John Lewis, leader of the U.S. civil rights movement; member of Congress since 1986
- Sanna Marin, 46th prime minister of Finland
- Margaret H. Marshall, former chief justice of the Supreme Judicial Court of Massachusetts, first woman to hold that position
- Omara Khan Massoudi, Afghan Museum director
- Robert Rubin, 70th United States secretary of the treasury
- Sonia Sotomayor, associate justice, United States Supreme Court
- Oliver Stone, film director and NYU Tisch alum
- Taylor Swift, singer-songwriter
- Justin Trudeau, 23rd prime minister of Canada
- Darren Walker, president of the Ford Foundation
- Charles Weissmann, professor and chairman, Department of Infectology, Scripps Research Institute
- Janet Yellen, Federal Reserve System chair
