= Peter Staecker =

American engineer

Peter Staecker is a former president of Institute of Electrical and Electronics Engineers. He holds degrees from Massachusetts Institute of Technology and Polytechnic Institute of Brooklyn. His professional career started in 1972 at MIT Lincoln Laboratory.
