= David Sobin =

David Sobin is a well known American inventor, and the former CEO of BAMnet Corporation, the parent company of ReplayLocker. A 24-year AT&T Executive, he led the team which created the first DSL (Digital Subscriber Line) product and deployed it globally. While at Bell Labs, he was awarded a patent for his invention of a fiber optic backplane. He left AT&T/Lucent in 1996 to found his own DSL company, which was subsequently sold for approximately $50M in 1998. He holds BS and MS degrees in Electrical Engineering and Computer Science from NYU Polytechnic School of Engineering.
