= Jasper H. Kane =

American biochemist

Jasper Herbert Kane (July 15, 1903 – November 23, 2004) was an American biochemist who had a central role in moving antibiotics such as penicillin from the laboratory table into industrial production in World War II. He was an alumnus of what is now called the New York University Tandon School of Engineering. He died in Florida in 2004, age 101.

== See also ==
- History of penicillin
