= Subrata Sen (engineer) =

Subrata Sen is the Joseph F. Cullman III professor and researcher at Yale University. He has a bachelor's degree in electrical engineering from the Indian Institute of Technology Kharagpur, an MS degree in industrial engineering from the New York University Tandon School of Engineering, and a PhD degree in industrial administration from Carnegie Mellon University.
