= Jerome Gavis =

Jerome Gavis was a scientist and professor who served as the chairman of the chemical engineering department at Johns Hopkins University. He helped develop methods of separating solid waste components. He was a member of the National Academy of Sciences. He earned a bachelor's degree in chemical engineering from New York University Tandon School of Engineering and a doctorate in chemistry from Cornell University. Gavis died on February 8, 2011, at the age of 82.
