= Ivan Lozowy =

Ivan Ivanovych Lozowy
- Іван Іванович Лозовий
- Born: 15 September 1961 (age 64); New York, United States
- Citizenship: United States, Ukraine (naturalized)
- Education: New York University School of Law; Panthéon-Assas University
- Known for: Founder of the Institute of Statehood and Democracy
- Political party: People's Movement of Ukraine

Ivan Lozowy is an American-born Ukrainian politician and journalist.

== Career ==
In February 1991, Mykhailo Horyn from the Popular Movement of Ukraine “RUKH” visited Washington and delivered a lecture at the invitation of The Heritage Foundation on Ukrainian independence.

From 2000 to 2001, he worked first for the personal service for the head of the State Committee on Information Policy, Television and Radio Broadcasting of Ukraine, Ivan Drach, later in the position of head of the New Information Technologies and Internet Directorate (which represents the 5th rank of government service).

Also, from 2002 to 2004, working as in-house counsel for the CJSC "Tokios Tokelės," a Lithuanian investor in the Ukrainian publisher “Taki Spravy,” he represented the investor in a complaint to the International Center for Settlement of Investment Disputes, which is affiliated with the World Bank.

== Political activity ==
During elections to the Verkhovna Rada in 2002, Lozowy was included from RUKH in the list of candidates from the block of political parties “Viktor Yushchenko’s Block ‘Our Ukraine’” at number 182.

As an early admirer of the reforms introduced in Georgia by President Mikheil Saakashvili, in 2017 Lozowy joined the newly formed political party Movement of New Forces of Mikheil Saakashvili (“MNFMS”), where he was first a member of the Political Council, the head of the Kyiv city branch, and later a member of the party’s leadership, the Party Council.

In 2019, Lozowy ran for a seat in the Verkhovna Rada in majoritarian district No. 167 in the Sumy oblast, self-nominated, but lost (placing second).

Following Saakashvili's imprisonment in Georgia in 2021, Lozowy organized a number of protest actions demanding Saakashvili's release.

== Civic activity ==
At the start of 1992, Lozowy founded the Pylyp Orlyk Institute of Democracy, one of Ukraine’s first non-governmental organizations, and served as its first Executive Director.

In 1996, with assistance from the Popular Movement of Ukraine “Rukh,” Lozowy founded the NGO, the Institute of Statehood and Democracy.

In 2007, as part of a widespread campaign for the recall of Walter Duranty's Pulitzer Prize, Lozowy organized a protest action in Kyiv

At the invitation of Oles Doniy in 2012, Lozowy became head of the Executive Committee of the All-Ukrainian Committee for the Protection of the Ukrainian Language and organized a number of events in Kyiv and also in Lviv.

In 2013, Lozowy founded the organization “Anti-Tabachnyk,” whose chief aim was the resignation of then Minister for Education Dmytro Tabachnyk. During protests which took place that November and preceded the Euromaidan, Lozowy accused Tabachnyk of imposing the Russian language, ignoring the Holodomor and Ukraine’s national heroes, and propagating Soviet views.

In 2015, Lozowy founded the charitable organization “The Charitable Fund in Memory of Ivan Hryhorovych Lozowy” in honor of his father. The Fund engages in providing assistance in the Sumy oblast, particularly the southern portion, where Lozowy’s father was born and raised.

In 2016, Lozowy created a new NGO, the Movement to Fight Corruption, among whose founders, besides Lozowy, were Professor Wolodymyr Cherniak and the Donetsk journalist Artem Furmaniuk.

The human-rights activist Iryna Nozdrovska, who was murdered at the end of 2017, worked with Lozowy in the Movement to Fight Corruption, also on behalf of Mikheil Saakashvili, the head of the Movement of New Forces. Lozowy conducted a separate, private investigation of the circumstances of Nozdrovsky's murder.

In 2020, as part of the activities of the Movement to Fight Corruption, Lozowy created the “International Data Base of Corrupt Officials in Ukraine,” set out in six languages, which was presented at a press-conference.

== Journalist activity ==
From 2004 to 2011, Lozowy worked as a journalist for the Internet publication “Transitions Online.”

In 2019, Lozowy registered a regional newspaper, “The True Word from Ivan Lozowy,” which began to circulate immediately, twice monthly, in the Sumy oblast, gaining a circulation of 14 thousand.Some local satraps attempted to block the paper's publication.

== Service in the “Aidar Battalion” ==
In May 2014, Lozowy joined up with the 24th Territorial Defense Battalion, which later became known as the “Aidar Battalion,” in fighting the invasion by Russia in eastern Ukraine in the Luhansk oblast.

Regarding his time with the Aidar Battalion, Lozowy released a video of his own photos and video fragments.
