= Russell K. Hotzler =

Russell K. Hotzler is the eighth and current president of New York City College of Technology. Prior to this presidency, Hotzler served as the Vice Chancellor for Academic Program Planning at The City University of New York. Hotzler holds a Bachelor of Science Degree and a Master of Science degree in Metallurgical Engineering and a Ph.D. In Physical Metallurgy from the Polytechnic Institute of Brooklyn, where he also served as a member of the faculty. Hotzler also is Chair of the New York State Regents Advisory Committee on Accreditation.
