= Charles Hinkaty =

Charles Hinkaty is director at Cache, Inc., director at Prestige Brands Holdings, Inc., and president and chief executive officer at DLI Holding Corp. He is on the board of directors at Cache, Inc., Prestige Brands Holdings, Inc., Prestige Brands, Inc., W.F. Young, Inc., International Orthodox Christian Charities, Inc., Renfro Corp., and New York University. Hinkaty was previously the director at Physicians Formula Holdings, Inc., lead director at FGX International Holdings Ltd., chairman at Consumer Healthcare Products Association, president and chief executive officer at Del Laboratories, Inc., president at Del Pharmaceuticals, Inc., a principal at Procter & Gamble Co., and vice president at Citibank NA. He also served on the board of SterlingBackcheck.

== Career ==
Since May 2010, Hinkaty has been the director of Prestige Brand Holding Inc. Hinkaty served as president and chief executive officer of Del Laboratories, Inc. from August 2005 until his retirement in January 2008. Hinkaty was also the Del Laboratories, Inc.'s chief operating officer from January 2005 to August 2005. From 1985 to January 2005, Hinkaty was the president of Del Laboratories Inc., subsidiary, Del Pharmaceuticals.

In 2009, Hinkaty was selected to join the company's board of directors at Physical Formula. He succeeded Jeff Berry, a director who resigned on May 29, 2009.

== Education ==
He received his B.S. and M.S. in mathematics from the New York University Tandon School of Engineering.
