= John Trani =

American business executive

John M. Trani was chairman and chief executive officer of Stanley Black & Decker from 1997 until his retirement in 2003. He was also the president and CEO of General Electric Medical Systems from 1986 to 1996. He graduated from Brooklyn Polytechnic Institute with a B.S. degree in engineering and also holds an M.A. from New York University.
