= Robert W. Cremin =

Robert W. Cremin served as the Chairman, President, and Chief Executive Officer of Esterline. He currently serves as chairman of Dover Corporation. In 2006, he was appointed British Honorary Consul. He graduated from New York University Tandon School of Engineering with an undergraduate engineering degree and also received an MBA from Harvard University.
