= Alix Strauss =

American author and satirist

Alix Strauss is an American author and satirist based in Manhattan. Her four published books include her two non-fiction works Have I Got A Guy For You and Death Becomes Them: Unearthing the Suicides of the Brilliant, the Famous, and the Notorious, and her two works of fiction The Joy of Funerals and Based Upon Availability.

== Biography ==
Strauss currently lives and works in Manhattan and is a freelance journalist. She graduated from New York University with a degree in educational theater and for the past 15 years has taught creative writing, fiction writing, writing for magazines, and personal essay writing.

== Writing career ==
Strauss' published works include interviews with Viggo Mortensen, Kristin Chenoweth, Carrie Fisher, and a number of others. She is known for her unusual and edgy articles including, for example, one she wrote after having a consultation with sexologist Betty Dodson, Ph.D. for some masturbation tips.

The Joy of Funerals was published in 2003 by St. Martin's Griffin. It has been described as "a novel in stories" tied together by the narrative that follows the life of Nina, a single woman in her thirties who attends the funerals of the previous tales' deceased characters, hoping to find some human connection. The various stories feature a variety of characters including a widow in "Recovering Larry" who looks for male companionship at the funerals she attends to the woman in "Swimming Without Annette" who has a troublesome obsession with her lover's killer.

Have I Got A Guy For You: What Really Happens When Mom Fixes You Up (Polka Dot Press, 2008) is an anthology of 26 true stories, edited by Strauss, about mothers who have fixed up their daughters on horrifically bad blind dates. These true stories are personal narratives from today's top contemporary female writers. Examples of these failed dates include a mother who wrote to Michael Gelman, the producer of Live with Regis and Kelly hoping to fix him up with her daughter, a woman whose blind date serenaded her, dressed head to toe in leather in the middle of a Starbucks, a writer who spent all eight hours of her blind date at a Dungeons & Dragons convention complete with costumes, and others.

In 2009, HarperCollins Publishers printed Strauss's third book Death Becomes Them: Unearthing the Suicides of the Brilliant, the Famous, and the Notorious, a non-fiction work about famous suicides.

Strauss' most recently published novel Based Upon Availability (HarperCollins Publishers) came out in June 2010. In a similar fashion to The Joy of Funerals, the book follows the lives of several women tied together by one central narrator, Morgan, a hotel manager - an emotionally battered character, haunted by her dead sister's memory, desperately seeking human connection. The book's jacket cover describes the hotel as "offering sanctuary to some, solace to others, the hotel captures their darkest moments as they grapple with family, sex, power, love, and death."

Strauss's essays have been anthologized in Sex, Drugs & Gefilte Fish ... The Heeb Storytelling Collection and her short fiction has been featured in the Primavera, Hampton Shorts, The Idaho Review, Quality Women's Fiction, Stories from the Blue Moon Cafe III, and A Kudzu Christmas.

The Joy of Funerals has been optioned for film. Strauss will write the screenplay and Stockard Channing is expected to direct the film adaptation. Death Becomes Them has been optioned for a television show by a well-known producer.

== Awards and honors ==
- The Ingram Award for The Joy of Funerals
- Best Debut Novel from The New York Resident for The Joy of Funerals
- David Dorenstein Creative Writing Award for the short story "Shrinking Away" featured in The Joy of Funerals
- Various awards from the Wesleyan Writers Conference, the Skidmore College Writer's Institute, the Sarah Lawrence Summer Program, and the Squaw Valley's Screenwriters' Summer Program.
