= Robert G. Brown =

Robert G. Brown Jr. (1857 - aft. 1940) was an American engineer who invented the first telephone handset, in 1878. The Gold and Stock Exchange in New York used a few of the handsets. They were not accepted by the Bell Company until nearly fifty years later, when they began being used in the United States. Robert G. Brown graduated from Brooklyn Collegiate and Polytechnic Institute (which became what's today known as NYU Tandon School of Engineering) in 1868.

== Europe connection ==
Brown went to France with the hope that there would be more receptivity to his idea. In 1879, the Société Générale des Téléphones produced a telephone using Brown's handset design, which became popular in Europe.
