= Kenneth Connor (engineer) =

Kenneth Connor (born 28 August 1946 in Madison, Wisconsin) is an Emeritus Professor in the Electrical, Computer, and Systems Engineering department at Rensselaer Polytechnic Institute, where he originally joined the faculty in 1974. He became an IEEE Life Fellow in 1998. He earned his BS, MS degrees in Electrical Engineering from the University of Wisconsin, and PhD in Electrophysics from New York University Tandon School of Engineering. He continues to work as an engineering education consultant since his retirement in June 2018.
