= Craig G. Matthews =

American businessman

Craig G. Matthews served as President, CFO and Chief Operating Officer of KeySpan. He received a BS degree from Rutgers University and an MS degree from NYU Poly.
