= Larry Zimmerman =

Lawrence A Zimmerman
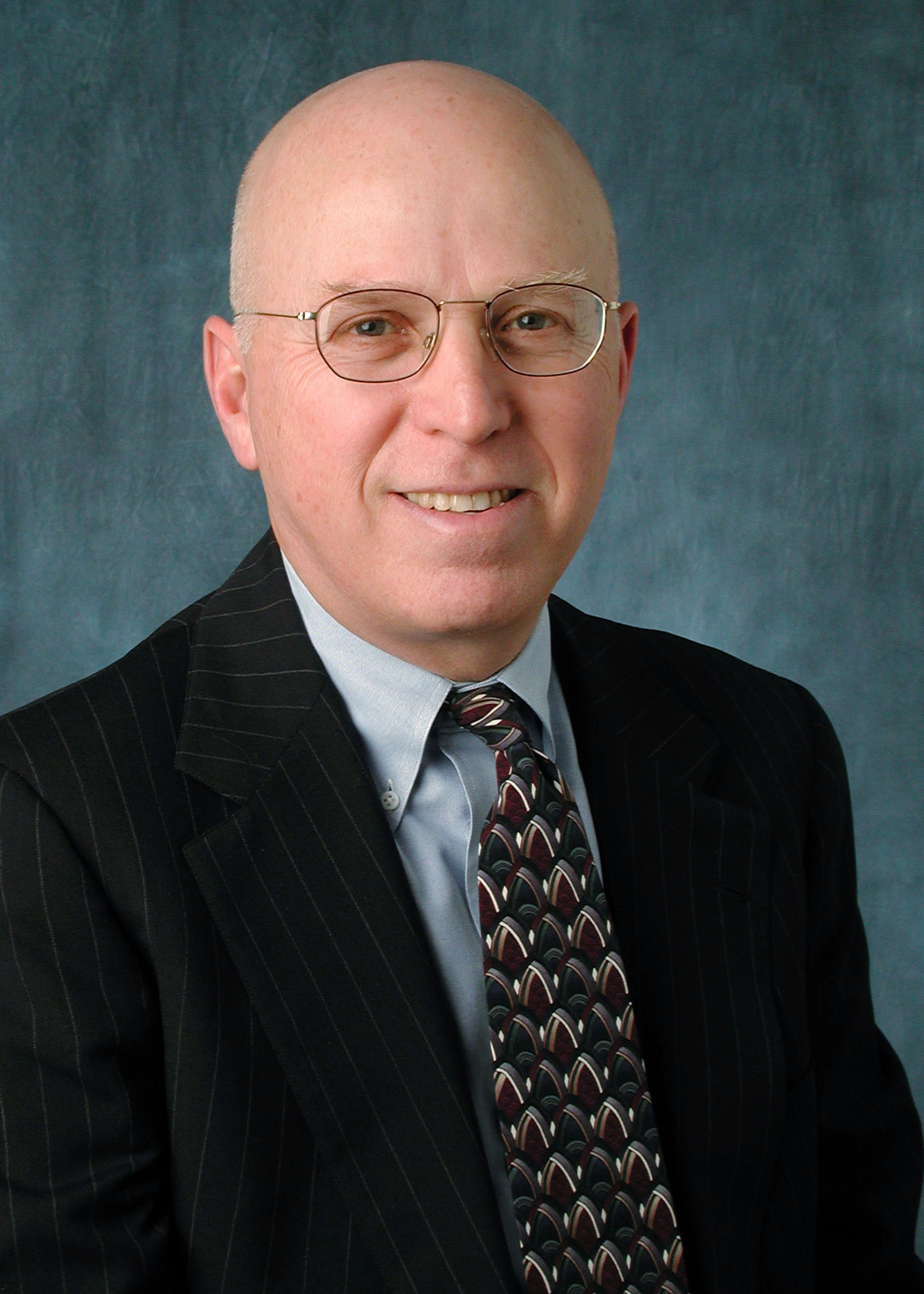
- Born: Bronx, NY, U.S.
- Citizenship: United States
- Education: New York University
- Occupation: Business executive
- Years active: 1970s-present
- Employer: Xerox Corporation (2002-2011) IBM (1967-1991) Caesars Entertainment Corporation (2016-2018) Aptiv (2009-2021) Brunswick (1996-1998) Flextronics International Ltd (2009-2021)

Lawrence A. Zimmerman, also known as Larry Zimmerman, is an American businessman who served as the chief financial officer and executive vice president of Xerox Corporation from June 1, 2002, to April 2011.

== Career ==
Prior to joining Xerox in 2002, Zimmerman served at System Software Associates, Inc., where he served as an executive vice president and chief financial officer from 1998 to 1999. He worked with International Business Machines Corporation (IBM), where he served in various senior finance executive positions, as vice president of finance for Europe, Middle East & Africa operations from 1994 to 1996 and a corporate controller from 1991 to 1994. He held various other positions at IBM from 1967 to 1991. Zimmerman served as an assistant general manager in finance and planning for the Enterprise System division from 1989 to 1991 and director of budgets from 1988 to 1989.

A 31-year employee of IBM, he served as vice president of finance and planning for Brunswick Corporation's multibillion-dollar Server and Technology division from 1996 to 1998. He served as a vice chairman of Xerox Corporation from July 2009 to April 2011. He has been an independent director at Flex Ltd. since October 2012, Global Imaging Systems Inc. since May 9, 2007, and Delphi Automotive PLC since November 2009. He served as an independent director of Brunswick Corporation from February 7, 2006, to May 6, 2015. He served as a director of Computer Sciences Corporation from August 7, 2012, to August 13, 2014. He served as a director at Stanley Black & Decker, Inc. (formerly Stanley Works) from July 26, 2005, to December 31, 2011. Zimmerman graduated from New York University in 1965 with a Bachelor of Science degree in finance and master's degree in business administration from Adelphi University in 1967.

In 2002, Zimmerman came out of retirement to take over as senior vice president and CFO of Xerox Corporation. Known for his financial restructuring skills, Zimmerman helped the Xerox CEO restore Xerox's reputation and guide it back to profitability after the company suffered through a messy Securities and Exchange investigation and subsequent $10 million fine.
