= Eugene Fasullo =

Chief Engineer of Port Authority of New York and New Jersey

Personal details
- Born: April 20, 1931
- Died: October 30, 2020 (aged 89)
- Spouses: Margaret Ann Hale (m. 1963); Maxine Hyrkas
- Education: Brooklyn Polytechnic Institute (BS); University of Illinois (MS)

Eugene Fasullo (April 20, 1931 - October 30, 2020) was the Chief Engineer of Port Authority of New York and New Jersey. He graduated with BS from Brooklyn Polytechnic Institute MS from University of Illinois. He was also a professor at NYU Poly.

During the 1993 World Trade Center bombing, Fasullo and seven other people were inside an express elevator in One World Trade Center. After being trapped for three hours, they managed to cut a hole in the elevator shaft with their keys and escaped into a restroom on the 58th floor.

Fasullo was elected a member of the National Academy of Engineering in 1994 for the design of outstanding structures and leadership in engineering and management in the public sector. In 2000, he received the first Lifetime Achievement Award that was given by the American Society of Civil Engineers in the category of public works.

He married Margaret Ann Hale on June 22, 1963 at Christ Episcopal Cathedral in Hartford, Connecticut. Fasullo died on October 30, 2020. He was 89 years old and survived by his wife, Maxine Hyrkas.
