= Herbert Carlin =

American electrical engineer

Herbert J. Carlin (1917–2009) was the J. Preston Levis Professor Emeritus of Electrical Engineering at Cornell University. He served as the director of the School of Electrical Engineering (now the School of Electrical and Computer Engineering) from 1966 to 1975 at Cornell University. He spent a year as a senior research fellow at the Physics Laboratory of the École Normale Supérieure, Paris, and was a visiting professor at several institutions, including the Massachusetts Institute of Technology, Tianjin University in China and University College Dublin.

Carlin also served as chairman of the Institute of Electrical and Electronics Engineers (IEEE) Professional Group on Circuit Theory and received the IEEE Centennial Medal in 1984. He received his B.S. degree and his M.S. from the Columbia University. He obtained his doctorate from The Polytechnic Institute of Brooklyn where he later became chairman of the Department of Electrophysics.
