= Newt Margulies =

Newt Margulies served as the dean and Professor of Management in the College of Business Administration at California State University, San Marcos. He also served as dean of the School of Business at University of California, Irvine.

He advised a wide variety of organizations on change and organizational transitions including TRW Space and Defense Systems, Northrop Corp., the Nuclear Regulatory Commission, Nissan Motor Company, Fluor Daniel Corp., a number of Head Start agencies, Kaiser Permanente, the National Emergency Medical System, San Francisco General Hospital and the Community Health Group.

He earned the B.S. degree in Engineering from New York University Tandon School of Engineering, the MS degree in Industrial Management from M.I.T., and the PhD in Management and Behavioral Science from UCLA, where he was appointed a Fellow in Executive Education.
