= Robert O'Handley =

Materials scientist

Robert O'Handley (1942–2013) was a professor and research scientist in the Department of Materials Science and Engineering (DMSE) at the Massachusetts Institute of Technology. He received an MS and PhD at the New York University Tandon School of Engineering. O'Handley authored many books.

== Bibliography ==
- Modern magnetic materials : principles and applications. New York, NY: Wiley. 2000. ISBN 9780471155669.
