= Niels Juel (disambiguation) =

Niels Juel (1629–1697) was a Danish-Norwegian admiral.

Niels Juel may also refer to:

- HDMS Niels Juel (1918), a coastal defense ship of the Royal Danish Navy
- Niels Juel-class corvette, a ship class of the Royal Danish Navy
- Niels Juel frigate HDMS Niels Juel (F363), Iver Huitfeldt-class frigate in the Royal Danish Navy
- Statue of Niels Juel, an 1881 statue in Copenhagen, Denmark

== See also ==
- HDMS Niels Juel, a list of ships of the Danish Royal Navy
- Juel (disambiguation)
- Juel (surname)
- Niels (disambiguation)
- Niels Juel Simonsen (1846–1906), Danish opera singer
- Thott Mansion or Niels Juel's Mansion, a 1680s mansion in Copenhagen, Denmark
