= Juul (disambiguation) =

Juul is an electronic cigarette company.

Juul may also refer to:

- Juul (given name)
- Juul (surname)
- Juhl, a surname also spelled as "Juul"
- Juul's House, Aarhus, Denmark; a building constructed in 1629
- An Old Norse name for Yule

== See also ==
- Jouault
- Jugul
- Juuliku
- Jul (disambiguation)
- Juel (disambiguation)
- Jewel (disambiguation)
- Joule (disambiguation)
