= Yule and Christmas in Denmark =

Christmas celebrations and traditions in Denmark

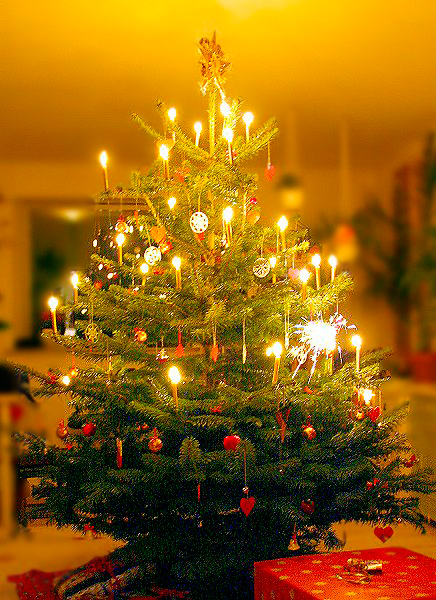
A Danish Christmas tree (Juletræet)

Jul ([ˈjuˀl]), the Danish Jule and Christmas, is celebrated throughout December starting either at the beginning of Advent, which is usually around 1 December, with a variety of traditions. Christmas Eve, Juleaften, the main event of Jul, is celebrated on the evening of 24 December (Christmas Eve), the evening before the two Christmas holidays, 25 and 26 December. Celebrating on the eve before Christmas is also used for most other holidays in Denmark, and in line with historic Christian traditions in which holy days have a vigil on the previous day.

Jul is originally an ancient old Norse tradition related to the Germanic Yule celebration of Northern Europe, but was mixed with the overlapping Christian tradition of Christmas when Denmark was Christianized during the 11th century. The traditions related to Jul have evolved through the centuries, still with many pagan traditions carried on today. In the 19th century, the tradition of bringing a Christmas tree inside the home was introduced gradually, inspired by Germany.

== Christmas Eve ==
In the evening, an elaborate dinner is eaten with the family. It usually consists of roast pork, roast duck, or (more rarely) roast goose, with potatoes, caramelized potatoes, red cabbage and plenty of brown gravy. For dessert, risalamande, a cold rice pudding dish, is served with a hot cherry sauce, traditionally with a whole almond hidden inside. The lucky finder of this almond is entitled to a small gift, which is traditionally a marzipan pig. In some families, it's tradition that the rice pudding dessert is made with the remaining rice porridge from the previous evening, a meal served on the 23rd, Lillejuleaften (Little Yule Eve), with cinnamon, brown sugar, and butter. It is eaten warm with a fruit drink (usually red cordial) or sweet malt beer.

After the meal is complete, (some families dance before the meal) the family will dance around the Juletræ and sing Christmas carols and hymns like "Nu er det jul igen" (Now it is Yule again) and "Et barn er født i Bethlehem" (A child has been born in Bethlehem). When the singing is complete, presents from under the tree are handed out by the children or in turn. After they have been opened, there are more snacks, candy, chips, and sometimes the traditional Gløgg.

== Church visits ==
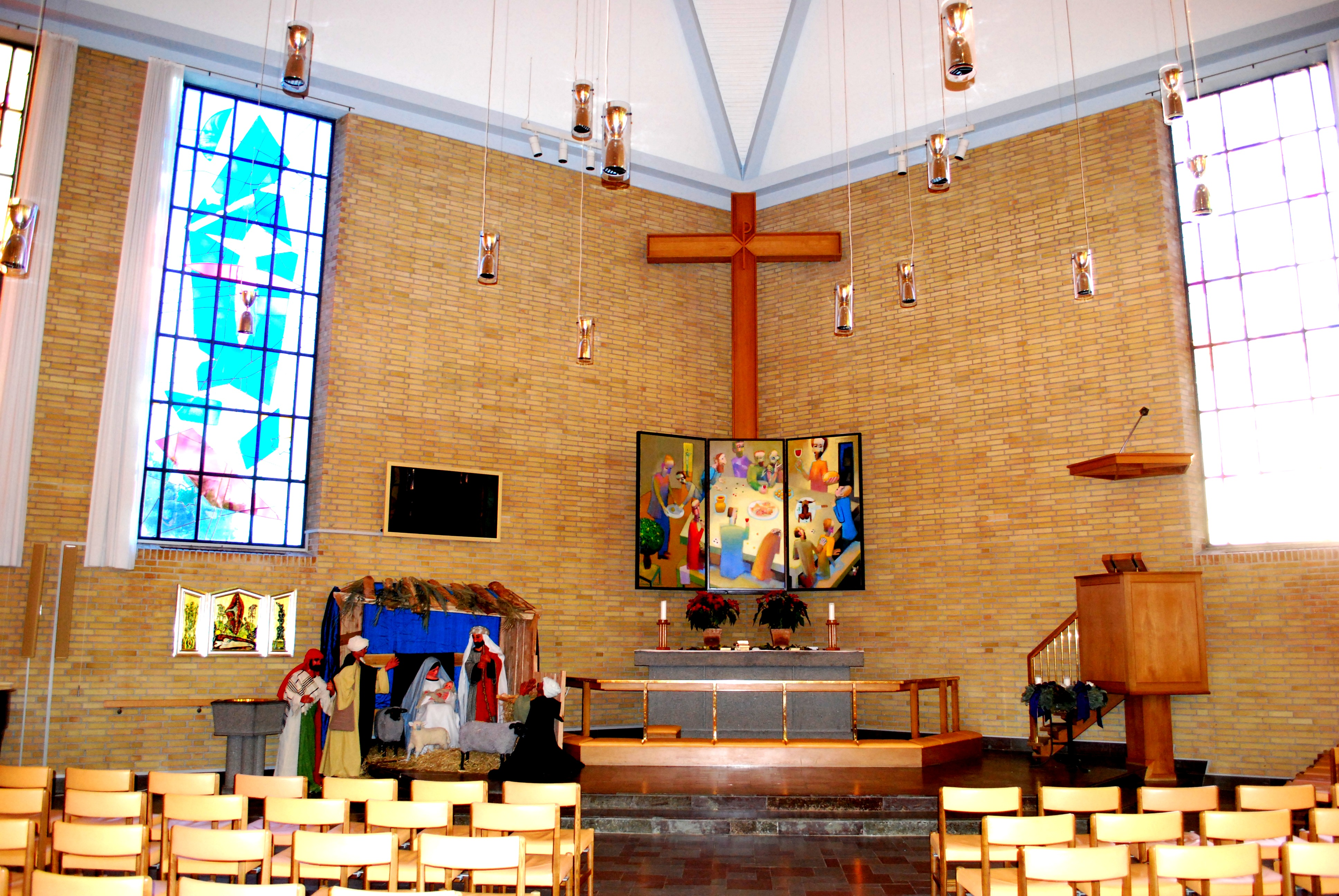
A nativity scene in Sorgenfri Evangelical-Lutheran Church in Virum, Denmark

In Denmark, there is a tradition to go to church on the afternoon of Christmas Eve, on the 24th, with the country being largely of the Evangelical-Lutheran denomination of Christianity. The text on which the liturgy is focused is Luke 2.

Most churches have Christmas services on both official Christmas holidays, 25 and 26 December, with well-defined rituals.

Going to church on Christmas Eve has become very popular. The services on 24 December are the most heavily frequented services of the year. In some areas with around a third of the population attending. There are no statistics of attendants at services in Denmark.

== Christmas lunches ==
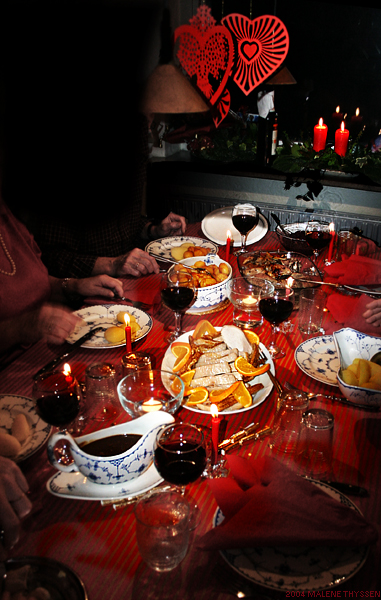
Traditional Christmas dinner (Julemiddag)

Throughout the Yule period, a range of Yule dinners or lunches is arranged. Before 24 December most workplaces, unions, schools, football teams, or extended groups of friends arrange a Julefrokost (Yule Lunch), but sometimes they are delayed until January. This typically involves plenty of food and alcohol, and often takes place on a Friday or Saturday night.

After 24 December, usually on Christmas Day and the Second Day of Christmas which are public holidays, the extended families arrange a familiejulefrokost (Family Yule Lunch). This usually involves more food, and takes place from noon until evening. An average Dane usually attends three to four julefrokoster and one or two familiejulefrokoster during Jul.

A typical Yule Lunch involves much beer and schnaps. It begins with a variety of seafood dishes; open face sandwiches with pickled herring, shrimps and deep fried plaice filet with Danish remoulade. Sometimes gravlax or smoked salmon and smoked eel are offered as well. Pickled herring comes in many varieties, with white, red, curried and fried pickled herrings as the most common options, and it is served exclusively on rugbrød, a special Danish rye bread, based on sourdough and whole grains. Next will be a variety of warm and cold meats, such as fried sausages, fried meatballs, boiled ham, liver pâté and fried pork, served with red or green braised cabbage dishes. Desserts are usually cheeses, fruit (mostly orange, clementine and mandarin) and risalamande, a special rice dessert associated with Christmas. From time to time, someone calls out "Skål" to make a toast, and everyone stops eating to take a drink. Normally, everyone takes public transportation to the event, to avoid alcohol related traffic accidents on the way home from these parties.

== Christmas confectionery and sweet treats ==
Throughout the Christmas month of December, various confectionery, fruits, cakes, beverages and sweet treats specifically associated with Christmas are widely available in the streets, in shops, cafés or in homes. This includes nuts (mostly hazelnut, walnut and almond), dried fruits (apricots, figs and raisins), oranges, clementines, mandarins, pigeon apples, brændte mandler (sugarglazed almonds), glazed apples on a stick, pancakes, æbleskiver, pebernødder, klejner, brunkager and other types of småkager (Danish cookies), gløgg (mulled wine) of various recipes and a variety of marzipan treats, some of which includes chocolate and Danish nougat.

== Advent Calendars ==
Denmark has adopted and expanded the German Lutheran tradition of Advent calendars. It is common to have Julekalender (Yule calendars) that mark all days from 1 to 24 December. They are often made of cardboard with pictures or treats such as chocolate. They come in various forms whether home-made or manufactured and can contain innocent stories of Yule, or might even be scratchcards.

A popular version is the gavekalender (gift calendar). These can either function as a julekalender marking all 24 days up to Yule Eve with a gift for each day or they can function as Advent calendars marking the four Sundays of Advent instead with a gift for each Sunday.

A special Danish calendar tradition started by DR in 1962 consists of broadcasting TV shows with exactly 24 episodes, one each day up to Yule Eve. The tradition has become very popular and every major network now has TV calendars during the Christmas period, whether original productions or TV shows. The tradition of TV calendars has also been adopted by the other Scandinavian countries.

== Christmas vacation ==
Because of the high concentration of holidays at the end of December, it is possible to have a vacation between Christmas and New Year without missing many days at work. This holiday is usually named "Juleferie" or Yule Vacation, and is usually considered to be in the date range from 24 December until approximately 1 January.

== Other traditions ==
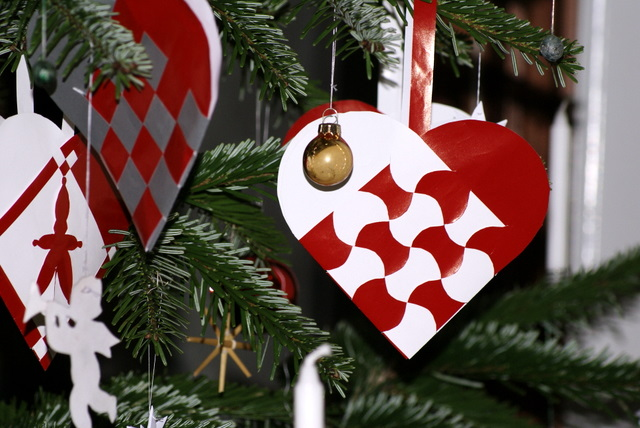
Julehjerter, or Yule hearts

In Denmark, Santa Claus is known as Julemanden (literally "the Yule Man") and is said to arrive on a sleigh drawn by reindeer, with presents for the children. He is assisted with his Yuletide chores by elves known as julenisser (or simply nisser), who are traditionally believed to live in attics, barns or similar places. In some traditions, to maintain the favor and protection of these nisser, children leave out saucers of milk or rice pudding or other treats for them on the afternoon on the 24th, and are delighted to find the food gone on Yule morning.

Danish homes are decorated with kravlenisser (climbing nisse), which are cardboard cutouts of nisser which can be attached to paintings and bookshelves. This is a unique Danish tradition started in the early 20th century.

Julehjerter or pleated Yule hearts are handmade decorations which are hung on the Yule tree. Children together with other members of the family create the hearts from glossy paper in various colours. Hearts and kræmmerhuse, decorated paper cones, are often filled with treats when hung on the tree. Another traditional decoration that is put on the tree are strings with small Danish flags attached to it.

St. Lucia Day is celebrated on 13 December.

== History ==
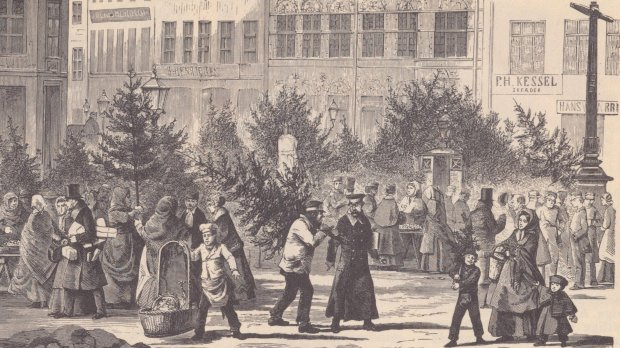
Christmas trees on Amagertorv in Copenhagen in the winter of 1867–68, illustration from Illustreret Tidende

Until 1770, the Christmas holidays included Christmas Day through Twelfth Night (also known as Epiphany Eve and celebrated on 5 January). Afterwards, only 1st and 2nd Christmas Day are government holidays, and 6 January (the Epiphany) is now a celebration day.

The first Christmas tree in Copenhagen was lit in Ny Kongensgade in 1811. Christmas trees became popular among the middle class from about 1820 and hence spread to all levels of society.

== See also ==
- Christmas worldwide
- Jól (Iceland)
- Jul (Norway)
- Julemanden
- Julenisse
- Juhl (surname)
- Yule

== Sources ==
- danmarkshistorien.dk: Jul i vikingetiden og den tidlige middelalder, Aarhus University (in Danish). About Danish Jul in the Viking Age and early Middle Ages.
- danmarkshistorien.dk: Julestuen – danske juletraditioner i 1600- og 1700-tallet, Aarhus University (in Danish). About Julestuer and Danish Christmas traditions in the 1600 and 1700s.

== Bibliography ==
- Feilberg, Henning Frederik: Jul I-II (1903)
