= Jewel =

Jewel most often refers to:

- Gemstone, a piece of mineral crystal used to make jewelry
- Jewel (singer) (Jewel Kilcher, born 1974), American singer and actress

Jewel may also refer to:

== Companies ==
- Jewel-Osco, a U.S. grocery store chain
- Jewel Food Stores (Australia), an Australian grocery store chain
- Jewel Records (disambiguation), several record labels

== People ==
- Jewel (given name)
- Jewel Burks Solomon, American tech entrepreneur and venture capitalist
- Jewel De'Nyle (born 1976), American pornographic movie star, sometimes credited as "Jewel"
- Jewel Staite (born 1982), Canadian actress in Firefly

== Fictional characters ==
- Jewel, a Dalmatian puppy with spots forming a necklace in 101 Dalmatians
- Jewel, one of the main characters in the animated film Rio and its sequel Rio 2
- Jessica Jones, a superheroine in the Marvel Universe who uses the alias Jewel
- Jewel the Beetle, a character from the IDW Publishing comic series Sonic the Hedgehog
- Jewel Bundren, male character in the novel As I Lay Dying by William Faulkner
- Jewel Sparkles, a Lalaloopsy doll and character in the TV series

== Music ==
- Jewel (Beni album), 2010
- Jewel (Marcella Detroit album), 1994
- "Jewel", a song by Ayumi Hamasaki on her 2006 album Secret
- "Jewel", a song by Blonde Redhead on their 1995 album La Mia Vita Violenta
- "Jewel", a song by Bradley Joseph on his 1997 album Rapture
- "Jewel", a song by T. Rex on their 1970 self-titled album

== Television and movies ==
- Jewel (1915 film), an American silent drama film
- Jewel (2001 film), a television drama film
- The Jewel (1933 film), a British crime film
- The Jewel (2011 film), an Italian drama film

== Biology ==
- Jewel beetles, the family Buprestidae
- Jewel butterflies, various Lycaenidae
- Jewel damselflies, the family Chlorocyphidae

== Other uses ==
- Jewel (novel), by Bret Lott
- Jewel bearing, a jewel-lined bearing commonly used in mechanical watches
- Jewel case, a variant of compact disc case
- Jewel Changi Airport, an airport terminal complex in Singapore
- Jewel Tower, a tower of the Palace of Westminster, in London, England
- Fraternal jewels, the medals worn in both secular and religious fraternal organisations
- KJUL, a radio station licensed to Moapa Valley, Nevada, which calls itself 104.7 the Jewel

== See also ==
- Jewellery (or jewelry in American English), decorative items worn for personal adornment
- Joule (disambiguation)
- Jewell (disambiguation)
- Jewells (disambiguation)
- Jewels (disambiguation)
- Juul (disambiguation)
- Jem (disambiguation)
