= Juel (disambiguation) =

Juel is a Nordic surname.

Juel may refer to:

- JUEL, an implementation of Unified Expression Language
- HDMS Niels Juel, a Danish navy ship, also called HDMS Juel
- Niels Juel-class corvette, a Danish Navy shipclass, also called Juel class
- Thott Mansion, aka Juel Mansion, Copenhagen, Denmark

== See also ==
- Jewel (disambiguation)
- Juhl (surname)
- Juul (disambiguation)
- Jul (disambiguation)
