= Jule =

Jule is a unisex given name and nickname, sometimes short for Julius. It may refer to:

== Women ==
- Jule Böwe, German actress Kathrin Cammann (born 1969)
- Jule Brand (born 2002), German footballer
- Jule Campbell (1925 or 1926–2022), American magazine editor
- Jule Flötgen (born 1991), German ice hockey goaltender
- Jule Hake (born 1999), German canoeist
- Jule Niemeier (born 1999), German tennis player
- Jule Power (1880–1932), American silent film and stage actress
- Julija Pranaitytė (1881–1944), Lithuanian newspaper editor, book publisher and traveler
- Jule Ross (born 2006), German Paralympic athlete
- Jule Selbo, American screenwriter, playwright, author, producer and professor

== Men ==
- Jule Berndt (1924–1997), American politician and Lutheran clergyman
- Jule Gregory Charney (1917–1981), American meteorologist
- Jule Eisenbud (1908–1999), American psychiatrist, author and researcher
- Jule W. Felton (1898–1978), American lawyer and justice of the Supreme Court of Georgia
- Jule Murat Hannaford (1850–1934), American railway executive, president of the Northern Pacific Railway
- Jule Huffman (1924–2015), American weatherman, voice-over announcer, director and children's show host
- Jule Mallonee (1900–1934), American Major League Baseball player briefly in 1925
- Jule Rivlin (1917–2002), American National Basketball League player and college men's basketball coach
- Jule Styne, English-American songwriter and composer born Julius Kerwin Stein (1905–1994)
- Jule Sugarman (1927–2010), American public administrator who founded and led the Head Start program

== See also ==
- Joule (disambiguation)
- Jul (disambiguation)
- Juul (disambiguation)
- Jull, a surname
