= Nils =

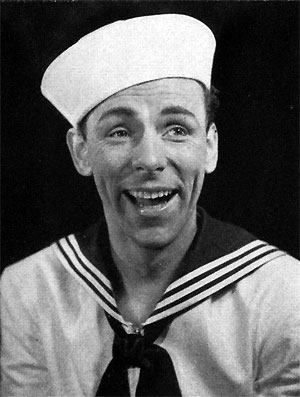
Nils Poppe in Blåjackor

Nils is a Scandinavian given name, a chiefly Norwegian, Danish, Swedish and Latvian variant of Niels, cognate to Nicholas.

== People and animals with the given name ==
- Nils Aas (1933–2004), Norwegian sculptor
- Nils Beckman (1902–1972), Swedish jurist and civil servant
- Nils Bejerot (1921–1988), Swedish physiatrist and criminologist
- Nils Bergström (born 1985), Swedish ice hockey player
- Nils Björk (1898–1989), Swedish Army lieutenant general
- Nils Dacke (died 1543), Swedish rebel
- Nils Elias Anckers (1858–1921), Swedish naval officer
- Nils Ericson (1802–1870), Swedish inventor and engineer
- Nils Fiechter (born 1996), Swiss politician
- Nils Frahm (born 1982), German pianist and producer
- Nils Frykdahl, American musician
- Nils Grandelius, Swedish chess grandmaster
- Nils Gründer (born 1997), German politician
- Nils Hald (1897–1963), Norwegian actor
- Nils Haßfurther (born 1999), German basketball player
- Nils Kreicbergs (born 1996), Latvian handball player
- Nils Lahr (born 1973), American entrepreneur
- Nils Lichtlein (born 2002), German Handball player
- Nils Liedholm (1922–2007), Swedish footballer and coach
- Nils Lofgren (born 1951), American musician
- Nils Lorens Sjöberg (1754–1822), Swedish officer and poet
- Nils Lundgren (born 1936), Swedish politician and economist
- Nils Mittmann (born 1979), German basketball player
- Nils Mohl (born 1971), German writer
- Nils Muižnieks (born 1964), Latvian-American political scientist
- Nils Ohlin (1895–1958), Swedish actor
- Nils Olav, a penguin in Edinburgh Zoo who is the mascot of the Norwegian Royal Guard
- Nils Personne (1918–2013), Swedish Air Force lieutenant general
- Nils Petersen (born 1988), German footballer
- Nils Poppe (1908–2000), Swedish actor
- Nils Sējējs (born 2001), Latvian ice hockey player
- Nils Seye Larsen (born 1980), Swedish politician
- Nils Trygg (1914–1951), Swedish woodcarver
- Nils Ušakovs (born 1976), Latvian journalist and politician, Mayor of Riga
- Nils-Erik Söderqvist (born 1948), Swedish politician
- Nils-Göran Holmqvist (born 1943), Swedish politician
- Nils-Joel Englund (1907–1995), Swedish cross-country skier

== Fictional characters with the given name ==
- Nils (Fire Emblem), the fictional bard in the Fire Emblem: Rekka no Ken video game
- Nils Hellstrom, the central character of the 1971 film The Hellstrom Chronicle
- Nils Hellstrom, the central character of the 1973 book Hellstrom's Hive by Frank Herbert, inspired by the 1971 film
- Nils Helstrom, a character in the 1933 film The Son of Kong
- Nils Holgersson, the main character of The Wonderful Adventures of Nils, a novel by Swedish author Selma Lagerlöf
- Nils Jesper, Joan Ferguson's henchman on Wentworth
- Nils Krogstad, a central character of the 1879 play A Doll's House by Henrik Ibsen
- NILS Statue, a structure in the Splatoon 2: Octo Expansion DLC made by Nintendo.
- Nils, a character in Double Fines video game Psychonauts
