= YUL (disambiguation) =

YUL is the IATA airport code for Montréal–Pierre Elliott Trudeau International Airport.

YUL or Yul may also refer to:

- Yul (name), including a list of people with the name
- YUL Condos, a residential high-rise in downtown Montreal
- York University Libraries, the library system at York University in Toronto
- Yuen Long station, Hong Kong, MTR station code
- Yul, a fictional kingdom from the Korean novel Hong Gildong jeon

== See also ==
- Yule (disambiguation)
