= Jewels (disambiguation) =

Jewels is another name for gemstones.

Jewels may also refer to:

== Music ==
- Jewels (Waylon Jennings album), 1968
- Jewels (Queen album), 2004
- Jewels (Einstürzende Neubauten album), 2007
- "Jewels" (song), a 2007 song by the Japanese rock band Alice Nine

== Other uses ==
- Jewels (ballet), a 1967 American ballet by George Balanchine
- Jewels (mixed martial arts), a Japanese mixed martial arts promotion focused on female fighters
- Jewels (novel), by Danielle Steel
  - Jewels (miniseries), a 1992 NBC television miniseries based on the novel
- The Jewels, an American girl group
- Three Jewels and Three Roots, a concept in Buddhism

== See also ==
- Jewells (disambiguation)
- Jewel (disambiguation)
- Jewell (disambiguation)
- Jewellery
- Juelz
