= Joule (disambiguation) =

The joule is a unit of energy.

Joule or joules may also refer to:

== People ==
- Joule (surname)

== Places ==
- 12759 Joule, an asteroid
- Joule (crater), on the Moon

== Companies and organizations ==
- Joule Assets, American provider of energy reduction market analysis, tools and financing
- Joule Centre, an energy research centre based at the University of Manchester, England
- Joule Inc., a subsidiary of the Canadian Medical Association
- Joule Unlimited, formerly Joule Biotechnologies, producer of alternative energy technologies
- The Joule Hotel, Dallas, Texas, US

== Other uses ==
- French submarine Joule, a French Navy submarine
- Joule (programming language)
- Optimal Energy Joule, an electric car
- Joule (journal), a scientific journal published by Cell Press

== See also ==
- Joules (clothing), a British casual clothes brand
- Jul (disambiguation)
- Jule (disambiguation)
- Juul (disambiguation)
