= Jewell =

Jewell may refer to:

== Places in the United States ==
- Jewell, California
- Jewell, Georgia
- Jewell, Kansas
- Jewell, New York
- Jewell, Oregon
- Jewell County, Kansas
- Jewell Junction, Iowa

== Places in Greenland ==
- Jewell Fjord

== People with the given name Jewell ==
- Jewell (singer)
- Jewell James

== Other uses ==
- Jewell (surname)
- Jewell (automobile), an American car produced 1906–1909
- Jewell railway station, Victoria, Australia
- William Jewell College, Liberty, Missouri, United States
- Jewell Building, a building in North Omaha, Nebraska, United States

== See also ==
- Jewel (disambiguation)
- Jewellery
- Jewells (disambiguation)
- Jewels (disambiguation)
