= Yuille =

Yuille is a surname. Notable people with the surname include:

- Alan Yuille (born 1955), English academic
- James Yuille McLean (1937–2020), Scottish football player, manager and director
- Joan Yuille-Williams, Trinidad and Tobago politician
- John C. Yuille (born 1941), Canadian psychologist
- Richard Yuille (1947–2026), American judge
- William Cross Yuille (1819–1894), Scottish Australian pastoralist

== See also ==
- Yule (surname)
- Watts and Yuille Warehouses
