= Juul (name) =

Juul is a Danish and Norwegian surname and given name. Notable people with the name include:

== Surname ==
- Christopher Juul-Jensen (born 1989), Danish racing cyclist
- Erling Juul (1897–1989), Norwegian track and field athlete
- Herb Juul (1886–1928), Major League Baseball pitcher, college basketball player, coach
- Herold Juul (1893–1942), professional baseball player, pitcher for the Brooklyn Tip-Tops
- Jesper Juul (family therapist) (1948–2019), Danish family therapist and author
- Jesper Juul (game researcher), game designer, educator, and theorist in video game studies
- Johannes Juul (1887–1969), Danish engineer, developer of wind turbines
- Mona Juul (born 1959), official in the Norwegian Ministry of Foreign Affairs, former politician for the Labour Party
- Niels Juul (1859–1929), U.S. Representative from Illinois
- Nille Juul-Sørensen (born 1958), Danish architect
- Ove Juul (1615–1686), Danish nobleman, Vice Governor-general of Norway under Ulrik Fredrik Gyldenløve from 1669 to 1674
- Pia Juul (1962–2020), Danish poet, prose writer and translator
- Soren Lokke Juul, Danish singer-songwriter and musician known as Indians
- Kasper Juul, fictional character played by Pilou Asbæk in the Danish TV series Borgen

== Given name ==
- Juul Bjerke (1928–2014), Norwegian economist
- Jens Juul Eriksen (born 1926), Danish cyclist
- Juul Haalmeyer, costume designer
- Holger Juul Hansen (1924–2013), Danish actor
- Morten Juul Hansen (born 1977), Danish football player
- Dorte Juul Jensen, senior scientist and head of the Center for Fundamental Research
- Davur Juul Magnussen, Faroese Trombonist from Tórshavn, Faroe Islands
- Søren Juul Petersen (born 1963), Danish independent film producer

== See also ==
- Jouault
- Juhl
