= All Saints' Flood =

All Saints' Flood is the name of different floods throughout history:

- All Saints' Flood (1170) (Allerheiligenvloed), 1170 AD in the Netherlands
- All Saints' Flood (1304) (Allerheiligenflut), 1304 AD in Western Pomerania
- All Saints' Day Flood of 1436 (Allerheiligenflut), 1436 AD in North Frisia
- All Saints' Flood (1570) (Allerheiligenvloed), 1570 AD in the Netherlands
