= Nielsine =

Nielsine is a given name, a feminine form of Niels. Notable people with the name include:

- Nielsine Nielsen (1850–1916), first female academic and physician in Denmark
- Nielsine Paget, a New Zealand homemaker and community worker
- Nielsine Petersen (1851–1916), Danish sculptor

== See also ==
- Niels (disambiguation)
- Nielsen (disambiguation)
