= Yule (surname) =

Yule, also Youell, Youle, Youll or Yuill, is a surname generally of British origin. Yule as a name is derived from the pagan festival of the same name, used for those born at Christmas time.

People with the surname include

- Annie Henrietta Yule (1874–1950), British film financier and breeder of Arabian horses
- Billy Yule (born c.1954), sit-in drummer for The Velvet Underground in 1970
- Bob Yule (1920–1953), New Zealand-born fighter pilot of the Royal Air Force during the Battle of Britain and Second World War
- Charles Bampfield Yule (1806–1878), Royal Naval explorer and author
- Sir David Yule, 1st Baronet (1858–1928), Scottish businessman based in India
- Daniel Yule (born 1993), Swiss alpine ski racer
- David Yule (field hockey) (born 1974), Canadian field hockey player
- Doug Yule (born 1947), American musician and singer, member of The Velvet Underground 1968–1973
- Emma Serepta Yule (1863–1939), American educator, writer
- George Yule (businessman) (1829–1892), Scottish merchant in England and India, fourth President of the Indian National Congress
- George Yule (linguist) (born 1947), British linguist
- Henry Youll (also Youell) (fl.1608), English madrigalist and composer
- Henry Yule (1820–1889), Scottish orientalist
- Ian Yuill (born 1964), Scottish politician
- Jack Youll (1897–1918), English recipient of the Victoria Cross
- Jimmy Yuill (born 1956), Scottish actor
- James B. Yule (1884–1957), American forestry engineer
- Joe Yule (1892–1950), Scottish-American vaudeville comedian, father of Mickey Rooney
- Joe Yule Jr. (1920–2014), birth name of American actor Mickey Rooney
- John Yule (Canadian politician) (1812–1886), a seigneur and politician in Canada East
- John Yule (botanist) (1762–1827), a Scottish physician and botanist
- John Yule (California politician) (1833–c. 1888), a Scottish-born American politician
- John Clinton Youle (1916–1999), American meteorologist, newspaper editor, and politician
- Michael Youll (born 1939), English cricketer
- Mike Youle (born 1960), British doctor and clinical researcher specializing in HIV treatment
- Oliver Youll (born 1970), English cricketer
- Paul Youll (born 1965), English science fiction artist, twin brother of Stephen
- Paul Yule (photojournalist) (born 1956), British photographer and film maker
- Paul Alan Yule (fl. 1980s–present), German archaeologist
- Robert Yuill (1924–2006), Canadian politician
- Stephen Youll (born 1965), English science fiction artist, twin brother of Paul
- Thomas Yule (born 1976), South African-born Scottish weightlifter
- Tom Yule (1888-?), Scottish footballer
- Tommy Yule (born 1953), Scottish footballer
- Udny Yule (1871–1951), Scottish statistician
- Wayne Youle (born 1974), New Zealand artist
- William Yule (psychologist) (1940–2023), psychologist and professor of applied child psychology

== See also ==
- Youell Swinney (1917–1994), American suspected murderer
- Huell
- Yuille
- Yul (disambiguation)
- Yule (disambiguation)
