= Normunds Sējējs =

Latvian ice hockey player and coach

- Born: February 16, 1968 (age 58) Riga, Latvian SSR, USSR
- Height: 6 ft 1 in (185 cm)
- Weight: 198 lb (90 kg; 14 st 2 lb)
- Position: Defence
- Shot: Left
- Played for: Dinamo Riga; Stars Riga; HK Pardaugava Riga; KooKoo Kouvola; HC Litvínov; ESC Moskitos Essen; HC Karlovy Vary; EHC Chur; HC Dukla Trenčín; HC Slovan Bratislava; HK Riga 2000
- National team: Latvia
- Playing career: 1987–2006

Normunds Sējējs (born February 16, 1968, in Riga) is a former Latvian ice hockey defenceman and coach.

Sējējs was the general manager of Dinamo Riga in the Kontinental Hockey League.

His twin sons Nauris and Nils are also professional hockey players.

== Playing career ==
=== Dinamo Riga (1987-1994) ===
Sējējs began his professional ice hockey player career in 1987, when he helped his team Dinamo Riga to win the Soviet Championship League silver medal. Normunds played for Dinamo until the end of 1990-91, but in 1991-92 he continued to play for Stars Riga, which was a direct successor of Dinamo. In 1992 the club was renamed once again to HK Pardaugava Riga, but it continued to play in International Hockey League. Normunds played for the club also in 1993-94, but as the club faced some financial difficulties and was not capable of paying wages on time, the Latvian defenceman began searching for career opportunities outside Latvia.

== Career statistics ==
			Regular season					Playoffs
Season	Team	League	GP	G	A	Pts	PIM	GP	G	A	Pts	PIM
1985–86	RASMS Riga	Soviet3	16	1	0	1	24	—	—	—	—	—
1986–87	RASMS Riga	Soviet3	53	2	7	9	83	—	—	—	—	—
1987–88	RASMS Riga	Soviet3	38	2	3	5	55	—	—	—	—	—
1987–88	Dinamo Riga	Soviet	23	0	0	0	16	—	—	—	—	—
1988–89	RASMS-Energo Riga	Soviet3	58	3	8	11	122	—	—	—	—	—
1989–90	Dinamo Riga	Soviet	44	0	0	0	32	—	—	—	—	—
1990–91	Dinamo Riga	Soviet	45	0	2	2	48	—	—	—	—	—
1991–92	Stars Riga	Soviet	30	0	1	1	20	—	—	—	—	—
1992–93	Pardaugava Riga	Russia	33	3	10	13	48	2	0	1	1	2
1992–93	Pardaugava Riga-2	Latvia	4	1	1	2	2	—	—	—	—	—
1993–94	Pardaugava Riga	Russia	40	1	7	8	48	2	0	0	0	0
1994–95	KooKoo	I-Divisioona	46	10	16	26	79	—	—	—	—	—
1995–96	HC Litvínov	Czech	38	6	6	12	32	15	1	4	5	20
1996–97	HC Chemopetrol	Czech	48	6	19	25	46	—	—	—	—	—
1997–98	ESC Moskitos Essen	Germany2	59	7	12	19	60	—	—	—	—	—
1998–99	HC Karlovy Vary	Czech	45	2	18	20	58	—	—	—	—	—
1999–00	EHC Chur	NLB	35	10	20	30	32	5	1	0	1	6
2000–01	HC Karlovy Vary	Czech	46	5	11	16	93	—	—	—	—	—
2001–02	HK Dukla Trencin	Slovak	43	5	13	18	57	—	—	—	—	—
2002–03	HK Dukla Trencin	Slovak	54	6	20	26	62	—	—	—	—	—
2003–04	HC Slovan Bratislava	Slovak	48	5	6	11	22	—	—	—	—	—
2004–05	HK Riga 2000	Belarus	32	3	7	10	30	3	1	0	1	2
2004–05	HK Riga 2000	Latvia	4	0	1	1	12	—	—	—	—	—
2005–06	HK Riga 2000	Belarus	19	0	7	7	18	—	—	—	—	—
2011–12	HK Ozolnieki/Monarhs	Latvia	1	0	0	0	0	1	0	0	0	0
Czech totals			177	19	54	73	229	15	1	4	5	20
Slovak totals			145	16	39	55	141	—	—	—	—	—
