= Jule (disambiguation) =

Jule is a unisex given name and nickname. It may also refer to:

- Amir Mahdi Jule (born 1980), Iranian screenwriter and actor
- Arlene Julé (born 1946), Canadian politician
- The Jule, the mass transit operator in Dubuque, Iowa, United States
- Jule Peaks, a small group of isolated peaks in Queen Maud Land, Antarctica
- Jule, Trøndelag, a village in Norway - see List of villages in Trøndelag
- Jule, a 1946 novel by George Wylie Henderson
