= Jan-Phillip Tadsen =

German politician (born 1988)

Member of the Landtag of Mecklenburg-Vorpommern
- Incumbent
- Assumed office 26 October 2021

Personal details
- Born: 10 April 1988 (age 38) Westerland
- Party: Alternative for Germany (since 2015)

Jan-Phillip Tadsen (born 10 April 1988 in Westerland) is a German politician serving as a member of the Landtag of Mecklenburg-Vorpommern since 2021. He has been a member of the Alternative for Germany since 2015.
