= Jul, jul, strålande jul (Artur Erikson and Anna-Lena Löfgren album) =

Studio album by Anna-Lena Löfgren
- Released: November 1969
- Genre: Christmas, schlager
- Length: 35 minutes
- Label: Metronome

Jul, jul, strålande jul is a Christmas album by Anna-Lena Löfgren & Artur Erikson, released in November 1969 to LP. It has also been released to cassette tape. It was rereleased to CD in 1990. Artur Erikson contributes, with rights from the Mission Covenant Church of Sweden's record label on the songs: Jul, jul strålande jul, O, sälla dag, Det är en ros utsprungen and Räck mej din hand (vi har samma väg att gå).

== Track listing ==
=== Side A ===
1. Jul, jul, strålande jul / G. Nordqvist, E. Evers
2. Ave Maria / C. Gounod, efter J.S. Bach
3. Julsång (O, helga natt, Cantique de Noël) (Minuit, Chrétiens) / A. Adam, A. Kock
4. Betlehems stjärna (Gläns över sjö och strand) / A. Tegnér, V. Rydberg
5. Jag drömmer om en jul hemma (White Christmas) / I. Berlin, Karl-Lennart
6. Räck mej din hand (Vi har samma väg att gå) / trad., G. Strandsjö

=== Side B ===
1. Julotta (Adeste Fideles) / trad., B. Haslum
2. Det är en ros utsprungen (Es ist ein Ros entsprungen) / trad., T. Knös
3. Stilla natt (Stille Nacht, heilige nacht) / F. Gruber, O. Mannström
4. Luciasången (Santa Lucia) / T. Cottrau, A. Rosén
5. O, sälla dag / trad., A. Erikson
