= Eidum =

Historic place on the German island of Sylt

Coordinates: 54°54′34″N 8°17′12″E

Eidum or Eydum (Danish: Ejdum, North Frisian: Eidem) was a historic place on the German (former: Danish) island of Sylt in the North Sea. It was several hundred metres west of the present coast line of the present-day village of Westerland.

== History ==
According to historic tradition the settlement of Eidum was destroyed several times by storm tides and then rebuilt again. The All Saints Day Flood of 1436 probably wreaked so much damage and so many casualties in the village of Eidum that survivors left it and founded a new settlement about 2 kilometres further east. Their choice alighted on the higher geest ridge in the area of Tinnum. This settlement was called Südhedig; from it arose the present day village of Westerland. The later name "Westerland" is supposed to have derived from an old Tinnum field name, on which this new settlement stood. The land was west of the village, hence "Wester-land".

The church of Eidum was reportedly destroyed in a storm tide in 1300. Another church building that was located southwest of modern Westerland had to be abandoned because of migrating sand dunes in 1634 or 1635. Its successor, the third church of Eidum, was built further east in 1637. The Eidum church was mentioned for the last time in the Dankwardt Chronicle of 1652.

According to an account from 1839, the last remnants of old Eidum were still visible on the seafloor in 1806 at extremely low tide.
