= Nils Lahr =

American computer scientist

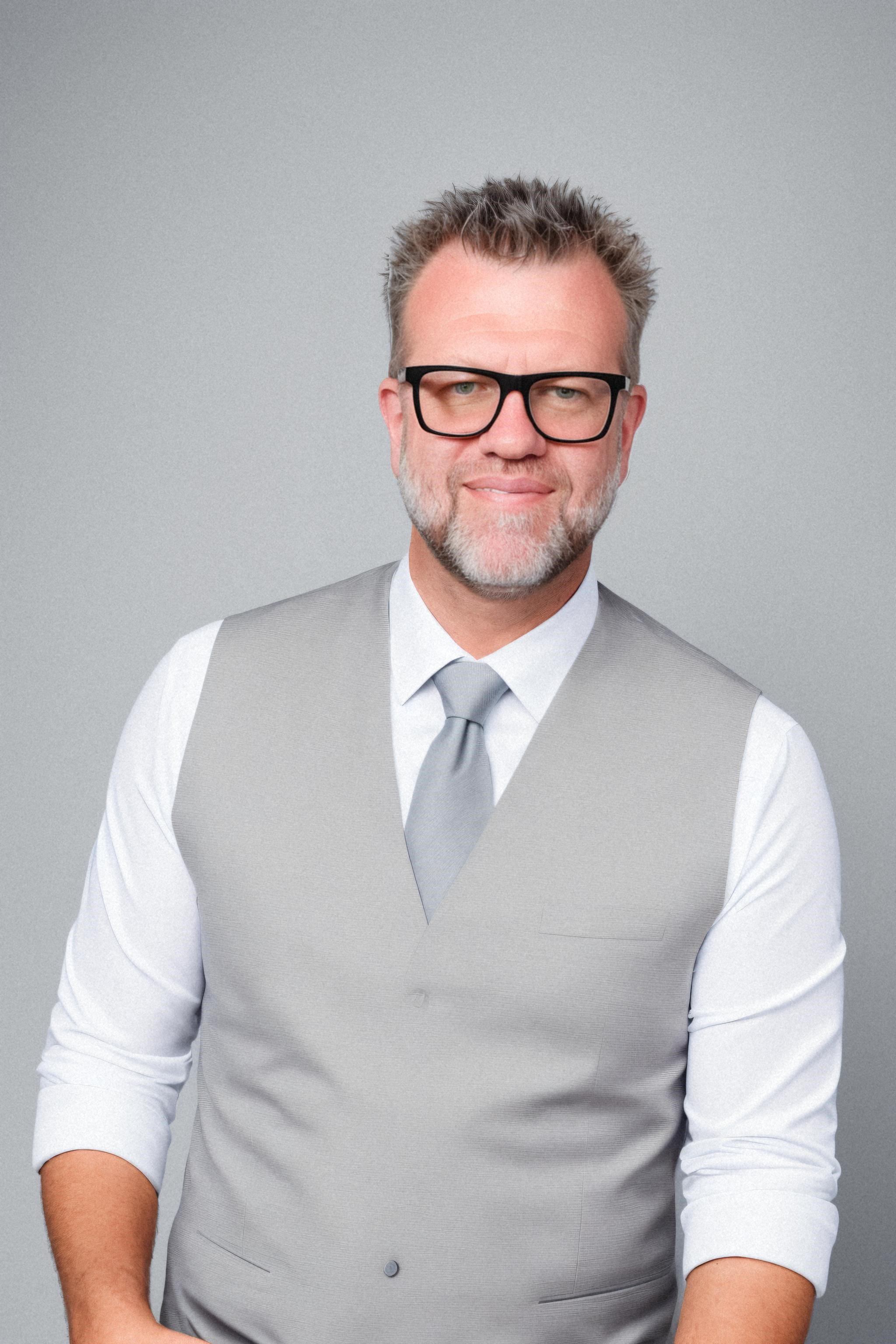
- Born: August 1973 (age 53)
- Education: NYU Polytechnic School of Engineering (B.S in Computer Science)
- Occupations: Chairman, and CEO of OrionsWave, LLC.
- Known for: Inventions in media streaming
- Spouse: Kristi Charlton Lahr (m. 2001)

Nils Lahr (born August 1973) is an American entrepreneur, inventor and computer scientist known for his work in the streaming media and artificial intelligence industries. He founded Synergy Sports Technology and several other companies. He has also been a senior developer, partner and CTO of the Live AI division at Microsoft. He co-founded Orions Systems, a company known for its AI vision systems, which was later acquired by Microsoft to enhance the capabilities of Dynamics 365.

== Early life ==
Nils Lahr was born in 1973 to John C. Lahr and Karen Ericson. His father was a scientist who worked as a research seismologist in the US Geological Survey from 1971 to 2003. Nils earned his higher education from Menlo-Atherton High School and his Bachelor in Computer Science from New York University Polytechnic School of Engineering. He started programming early at the age of 16 by writing object-oriented databases for the US Geological Survey.

== Career ==
Lahr began his career by working and founding some notable companies in the field of streaming and media, notable among them are;

=== CNNfn ===
Lahr worked at CNNfn, a financial news channel when it did the world's first streaming broadcast and built first fully digital studio. He was the webmaster of the team. In 1996, he also said to InfoWorld magazine that the only way for companies to get their content on the internet is through making it easy to find. During his career at CNNfn, he created the first automated stock ticker for TV.

=== Microsoft ===
Lahr joined Microsoft in 1996, after leaving CNNfn, and helped as a founding member of its streaming media division. Prior to joining Microsoft he worked for VXtreme and developed streaming media solutions which were later bought by Microsoft and were essential in the development of Windows Media Player and MPEG4.

In 2020, Lahr's co-founded venture, Orions Systems, known for its AI vision system, was acquired by Microsoft. This acquisition marked a significant enhancement in the capabilities of Dynamics 365. With the integration of Orions Systems, it has become a major AI element within Microsoft's ecosystem, further emphasizing Lahr's influential contributions to Microsoft's advancements in artificial intelligence.

=== iBEAM Broadcasting ===
Lahr co-founded iBEAM Broadcasting Corporation in April 1998. He later served as its Chief Scientist and, from May to mid-2021, as its CTO. Under Lahr's leadership, iBEAM Broadcasting became a significant player in the streaming and media industry. The company was eventually acquired by Williams Communications.

=== Youbetme ===
Youbetme is a California based social betting platform, that enables users to bet via their website or their IOS app. It was founded by Jason Neubauer and Justin Jarman in 2011 and the technological services were provided by Nils Lahr, he is also the CTO of the company. May 2016 OrionsWave was assigned the intellectual property and software of Challenged and YouBetMe.

=== Synergy Sports Technology, LLC ===
Lahr is the co-founder and CTO of Synergy Sports Technology. The company provides statistical reports and associated video clips to the NBA coaches and also works for college teams. Nils Lahr architected and developed the initial platform and all the streaming solutions for the company.

In 2021, Synergy Sports was acquired by Sportradar. Synergy Sports was created in 2020 by merging Atrium Sports, Synergy Sports Technology, and Keemotion into one company. The company has established partnerships with the NBA, MLB, and FIBA and serves over 4000 clients globally.

=== LexiconDigital ===
He worked with David Caruso, around ideas on how to bring production concepts into the digital world sooner for promotional reasons. They helped influence how some very large and early Hollywood projects promoted themselves online, such as the first and second Iron Man movies. They had a significant impact in a short time, changing how movies used the Internet to promote themselves long before the release date.

Orions Systems

Lahr co-founded Orions Systems, a company known for its AI vision system, which was later acquired by Microsoft to enhance the capabilities of Dynamics 365.

== Patents ==
Lahr has numerous patents spanning in the field of streaming media and content some notable among them are:

- SYSTEMS, METHODS AND ARTICLES TO AUTOMATICALLY EXPOSE AND PLACE MATERIAL IN STREAMS OF PROGRAMMING
- SYSTEM AND METHOD FOR DISTRIBUTED AND PARALLEL VIDEO EDITING, TAGGING AND INDEXING
- Systems and methods for generating bookmark video fingerprints
- SYSTEM AND METHODS FOR OPTIMIZING BUFFERING HEURISTICS IN MEDIA
- Using a website containing video playlists as input to a download manager
- System and method for rewriting a media resource request and/or response between origin server and client
- Generating Event Definitions Based on Spatial and Relational Relationships
- Method and apparatus for encoder-based distribution of live video and other streaming content
- Automated user activity associated data collection and reporting and content/metadata selection and propagation service
- Peer-to-peer betting systems and methods
- A system and method for determining optimal server in a distributed network for serving content streams
- Method of utilizing a single uniform resource locator for resources with multiple formats
- Method and apparatus for client-side authentication and stream selection in a content distribution system

== See also ==
- Streaming media
