= Niels (disambiguation) =

Niels is a masculine given name.

Niels may also refer to:

- Niels Island, Canada
- Niels Peak, Queen Maud Land, Antarctica
- 1720 Niels, an asteroid
- Niels (video gamer) or Zven (born 1997), Danish League of Legends player

== Other uses ==
- St. Niels, Germany, a Lutheran church
