= Jul, jul, strålande jul (disambiguation) =

Jul, jul, strålande jul may refer to:

- "Jul, jul, strålande jul", Swedish Christmas song
- Jul, jul, strålande jul (Artur Erikson & Anna-Lena Löfgren album), 1969
- Jul, jul, strålande jul (Nils Börge Gårdh album), 2001
- Jul, jul, strålande jul (Ingvar Wixell album), 1964
