= Judith Daylen =

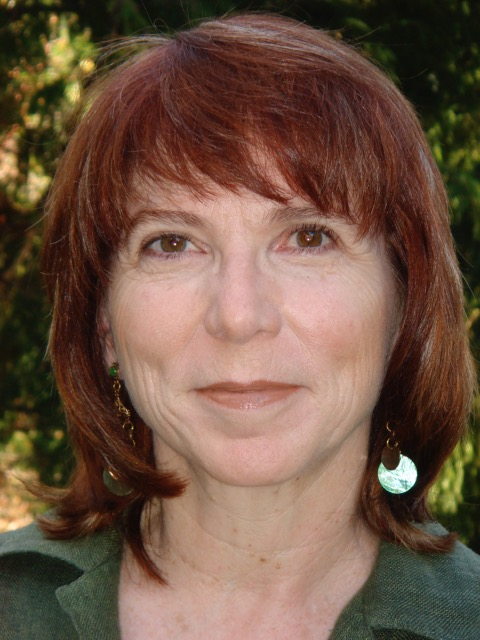
- Born: Tennessee, United States
- Citizenship: Canada, United States
- Spouse: John C. Yuille

Judith L. Daylen (previously Cutshall) is a board-certified psychologist. In 1982, she received her B.A. in psychology and philosophy from the University of North Carolina. In 1985, Dr. Daylen received her M.A. in cognitive psychology, and in 1994 she received her PH.D. in clinical psychology both from the University of British Columbia. Dr. Daylen currently works as a clinical and consulting psychologist- she assesses the harm suffered to sexual assault victims and provides expert testimony in court. Recently, Dr. Daylen has focused on providing psychological assessments of victims of physical and sexual assault; however, she has past experience in providing both individual and group treatment to assault victims. To better understand the experience of assault victims and to assist them during times of crisis, Dr. Daylen also volunteered at a rape crisis center. She has even contributed to a book: "Trauma, Trials, and Transformation, Guiding sexual assault victims through the legal system and beyond". In addition to her work with sexual assault victims, Dr. Daylen has contributed to assessing the reliability of eyewitness testimony. Along with John C. Yuille in 1986, Dr. Daylen published a psychological experiment which concluded that eyewitness testimony is often reliable and has merit. Dr. Daylen is also an ordained lay practitioner of Zen Buddhism.

== Book Publications ==
=== Trauma, Trials, and Transformation, Guiding sexual assault victims through the legal system and beyond ===
Dr. Daylen is the lead author of a book, published in 2006, "Trauma, Trials, and Transformation, Guiding sexual assault victims through the legal system and beyond". This book aims to facilitate the emotional and psychological journey of sexual assault victims and to help them understand the Canadian legal system regarding the attack. It helps to guide victims who want to legally hold the offender accountable. This book addresses both the legal measures to be taken as well as helps the victim psychologically- helping them to grow and transition into a new reality- which sets it apart from similar books.

== Contributions to Psychology ==
=== Yuille & Cutshall (1986) ===
Dr. Daylen was published in the 1986 study on "Eyewitness Effectiveness" which aimed to investigate the accuracy of recall in eyewitness testimonies by using a real crime and real eyewitnesses. Thirteen participants, who all witnessed a gun shooting incident, were interviewed and asked to recall the event. They were also asked misleading questions which aimed to further test the accuracy of the eyewitness' recall. It was found that their memories were very accurate and matched police reports. In addition, leading questions had little effect on memory. This study had high ecological validity, and it used semi-structured interviews which made it easier to standardize. This study is very important in proving that there is merit in eyewitness testimonies, especially because it was the first study to use real witnesses of a real incident.

=== Criminal Injuries Compensation (1994-2001) ===
Dr. Daylen provided consultation to lawyers in over 2,000 cases adjudicating criminal injury crimes. This consultation included conducting psychological assessments on victims of primarily physical and sexual assault, conducting credibility assessments of complainants' allegations, and determining the relationship between current psychological functioning and criminal injury.

=== Burnaby Correctional Centre for Women (1992-2000) ===
Dr. Daylen conducted both psychological and intellectual testing for incarcerated female offenders. She provided written psychological assessments and provided consultation to staff regarding management of inmates. In addition, she provided weekly psychotherapy to inmates.

=== Workers Compensation Board (1993-1994) ===
Dr. Daylen conducted research and psychological assessments with clients as a postdoctoral fellow at Workers Compensation Board. Clients included those reporting post-traumatic stress related to industrial accidents and to criminal victimization at work, including physical or sexual threats or assault. From this work she developed a pamphlet to give to clients and families in regards to Post-traumatic Stress reactions.

=== Hutchinsongs Psychiatric Center (1990-1991) ===
Dr. Daylen worked a full-time internship with psychiatric outpatients at a psychiatric hospital and a community mental health center, with particular focus on personality disorders such as Borderline Personality Disorder. She provided both psychological assessments and treatment for a wide range of individuals, couples, and groups.

=== Juvenile Services to the Court (1988-1990) ===
Dr. Daylen conducted psychological testing of juvenile offenders, often related to sexual assault, and attended case conferences related to assessments.

=== WAVWAW Rape Crisis Worker (1988-1990) ===
Dr. Daylen worked as a volunteer worker providing telephone counselling, legal and medical accompaniment of adult female sexual assault victims.

=== Vancouver General Hospital and UBC Psychological Clinic (1987-1988) ===
Dr. Daylen worked as a full-time practicum. She conducted psychological assessments of adult and adolescent inpatients, neuropsychological assessments of outpatients, and conducted supervised therapy with patients.

== Further Publications ==
- Yuille, J.C., & Cutshall, J.L. (1986). A case study of eyewitness memory of a crime. Journal of Applied Psychology, 71, 291-301.
- Daylen, J., (2006). Trauma, Trials, and Transformation: Guiding Sexual Assault Victims Through the Legal System and Beyond. Toronto, Canada: Irwin Law.
- Yuille, J.C., Daylen, J.L., Porter, S. & Marxsen, D. (1995). Challenging the eyewitness expert. Coping with psychiatric and psychological testimony. 5, 1267-1298
- Cutshall, J. L., Yuille, J. C. (1989). Analysis of witness statements. In D. C. Raskin (Ed.), Psychological Techniques in Law Enforcement. New York: Springer.
- Yuille, J. C., Cutshall, J. L. (1989). Analysis of the Statements of victims, witnesses and suspects. In J.C. Yuille (Ed.), Credibility assessment. Rotterdam: Kluwer.
- Yuille, J.C., Daylen, J.L., Porter, S. & Marxsen, D. (1995). Challenging the eyewitness expert(pp. 1266-1298). In J.Ziskin & D. Faust (Eds.) Coping with psychiatric and psychological testimony. Fifth edition. Los Angeles: Law and Psychology Press.
- Yuille, J.C., Daylen J.L. (1996). Children Speak for Themselves: Using the Kempe Interactional Assessment to Evaluate Allegations of Parent-Child Sexual Abuse. Contemporary Psychology, 41(10), 1043-44.
- Yuille, J.C., Daylen, J. (1998). The impact of traumatic events on eyewitness memory. In Thompson, C., Herrmann, D., Read, D., Bruce, D., Payne, D., Toglia, M. (Eds.), Eyewitness memory: Theoretical and applied perspectives. New Jersey: Lawrence, Erlbaum Associates.
- Daylen, J., Yuille, J.C. (2002). Assessment of Adult Plaintiffs in Childhood Sexual Abuse Cases. In Schultz, I. Z., Brady D. (Eds). Psychological Injuries at Trial, pp. 1339-1370. Chicago, Ill: American Bar Association.
