= Jull =

Jull is a surname. Notable people with the name include:

- Albert Jull (1864–1940), New Zealand politician
- David Jull (1944–2011), Australian politician
- Jack Jull (died 1920), English footballer
- Margaret Jull Costa (born 1949), British translator and writer
- Peter Jull, Canadian political scientist and academic
- Roberta Jull (1872–1961), Australian medical doctor

== See also ==
- Jul (disambiguation)
