= Westerland, Germany =

Westerland Weesterlön / Vesterland
- Ortsteil of Gemeinde Sylt
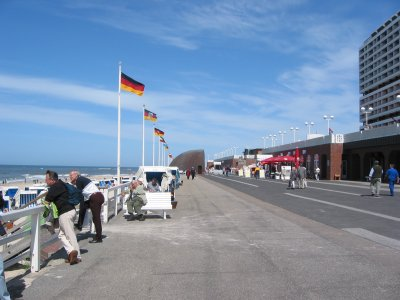
- Kurpromenade in 2003

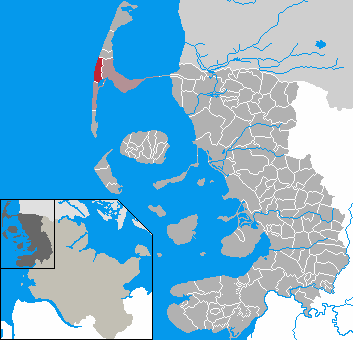
- Location of Westerland within the Nordfriesland district
- Interactive map of Westerland; Weesterlön / Vesterland
- Location within Germany Location within Schleswig-Holstein
- Coordinates: 54°54′36″N 8°18′27″E
- Country: Germany
- State: Schleswig-Holstein
- District: Nordfriesland
- Town: Gemeinde Sylt

Area
  - Total: 10.45 km^{2} (4.03 sq mi)
- Elevation: 5 m (16 ft)

Population (2019-12-31)
  - Total: 12,500
  - Density: 1,200/km^{2} (3,100/sq mi)
- Time zone: UTC+01:00 (CET)
  - Summer (DST): UTC+02:00 (CEST)
- Postal codes: 25969–25980
- Dialling codes: 04651
- Vehicle registration: NF
- Website: www.gemeinde-sylt.de

Westerland (German pronunciation: [ˈvɛstɐlant]; Danish: Vesterland; Söl'ring North Frisian: Weesterlön’) is a seaside resort and a former municipality located on the German North Sea island of Sylt. Since 1 January 2009, Westerland has been part of the municipality Gemeinde Sylt. Westerland is part of the Nordfriesland district in Schleswig-Holstein. It is the largest resort on the island, the local transportation hub and the centre of Sylt's tourist industry.

== History ==
Westerland is partly one of the younger settlements on the island of Sylt. After the All Saints' Day Flood of 1436 had destroyed the biggest part of the community of Eidum (except for the area that is today called Enden and the Church), the survivors built a new community to the northeast on a heath. The new settlement was called Hedigen (heath area).

In the 16th century most of the people on Sylt were involved in the hunting of Herring near Heligoland, Westerland was no exception.

The Old Church of Eidum St. Niels was demolished in 1634, mainly due to a particularly bad stench, and rebuild in the heath area, far away from the sea, in 1636.

Westerlant (probably an old field name used by the people of Tinnum) had its first documentary mention in 1462. In 1636, there were 43 and, in 1695, 76 taxable houses.

The village grew rapidly during the 17th and 18th centuries because people experienced a great increase in wealth thanks to whaling. Previously, people had only lived from the sea and what little their fields could provide (they were often destroyed by the wandering dunes or flooding).

In 1855, the local Landvogt decided to turn Westerland into a seaside resort. After 1857, the minor village centred on a church began to grow into a larger resort. That year the first hotel opened - the Dünenhalle. Many others followed, although a number of them have since been torn down to make room for different structures. In 1880, the first solid building was erected on the dunes right at the beach. Electricity was available from 1893. In 1897, a telephone cable to the mainland was laid. In 1888, the Kurhalle was inaugurated, followed in 1903 by the Art Nouveau hotel Miramar, which still stands on the promenade.

In the 1890s, Westerland replaced Keitum as the preeminent town on Sylt, not just for tourists but also regarding infrastructure and facilities used by the locals. This was illustrated by the move, in 1892, of the island's only pharmacy from Keitum to Westerland.

In 1908, a building for spa applications was built (Kurmittelhaus). The original airfield (now Sylt Airport) was constructed in 1912. Due to the military fortification of the island under the Nazis, the town's population increased from 4,000 in 1934 to 7,700 by 1940.

In 1948 came official recognition as a seaside spa town (Nordseeheilbad). The concrete highrises that today dominate the Westerland skyline (and are visible from many places on Sylt) were built in 1966-68 (Kurzentrum, Metropol). Another, even more gargantuan, development project named Atlantis was stopped in 1971 after protests by locals.

== Geography ==
Westerland is located on the western shore of the island of Sylt on the North Sea. It lies 70 km northwest of Husum, 74 km west of Flensburg, 134 km northwest of Kiel and 186 km northwest of Hamburg.

Westerland used to be Germany's northernmost town. Only the smaller communities of List, Wenningstedt and Kampen – none being incorporated towns – lie farther north in Germany. However, with the merger to Gemeinde Sylt in 2009 Westerland gave up its status as Stadt (see Government).

== Economy ==
Westerland's economy is strongly oriented towards the island's tourism industry. Recently it had 2.5 million overnight stays annually in around 25,000 beds. There are roughly 1,300 tradespersons in town, accounting for an annual tax income of around €500 per inhabitant.

In the town's south end near Rantum is a campground. Westerland is the central hub for supply, retailing, and numerous services that provide for the inhabitants and visitors on the island of Sylt.

Due to its affluence and strong tourism industry, Westerland, has been called the "Beverly Hills" of Germany.

== Attractions ==
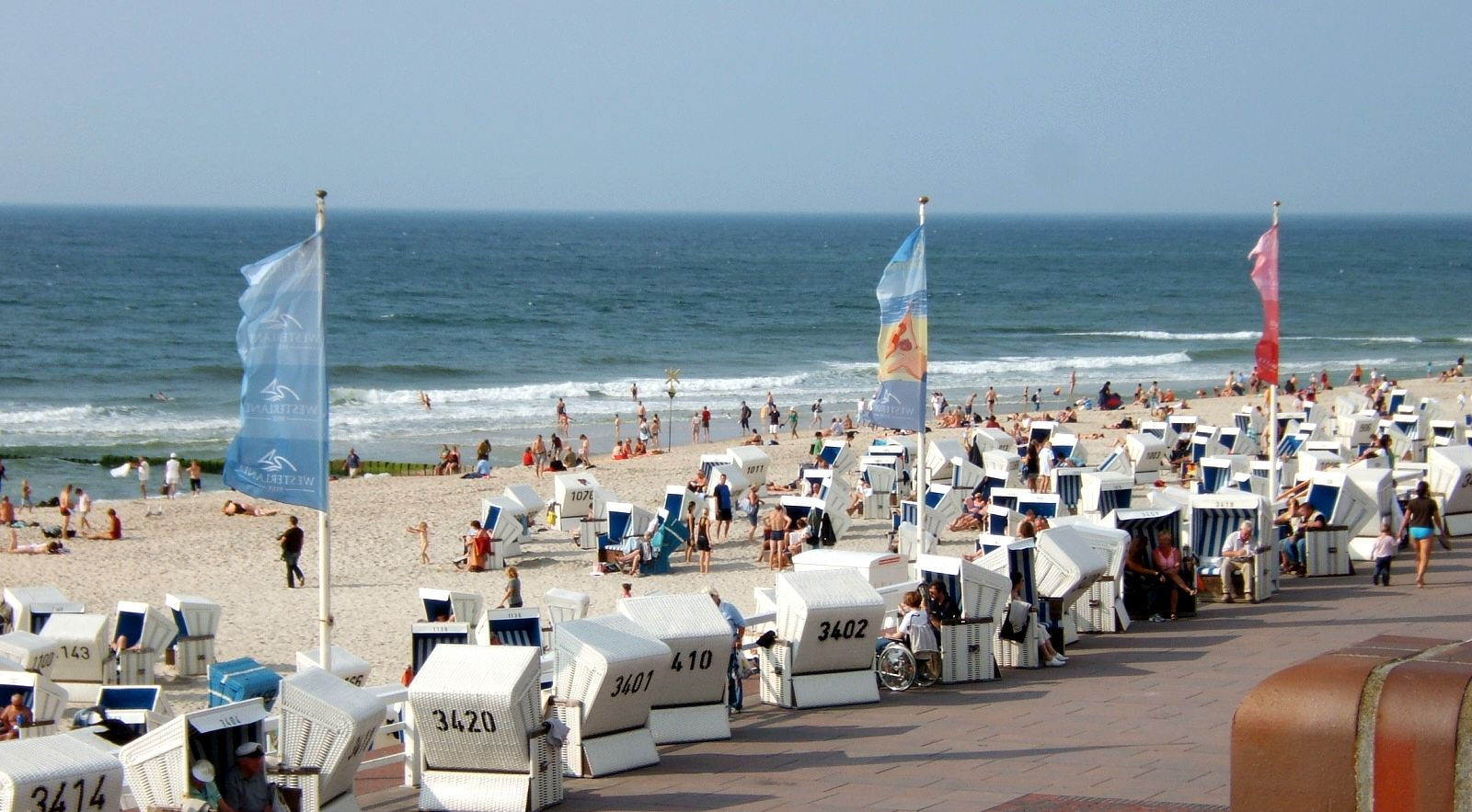
Westerland beach

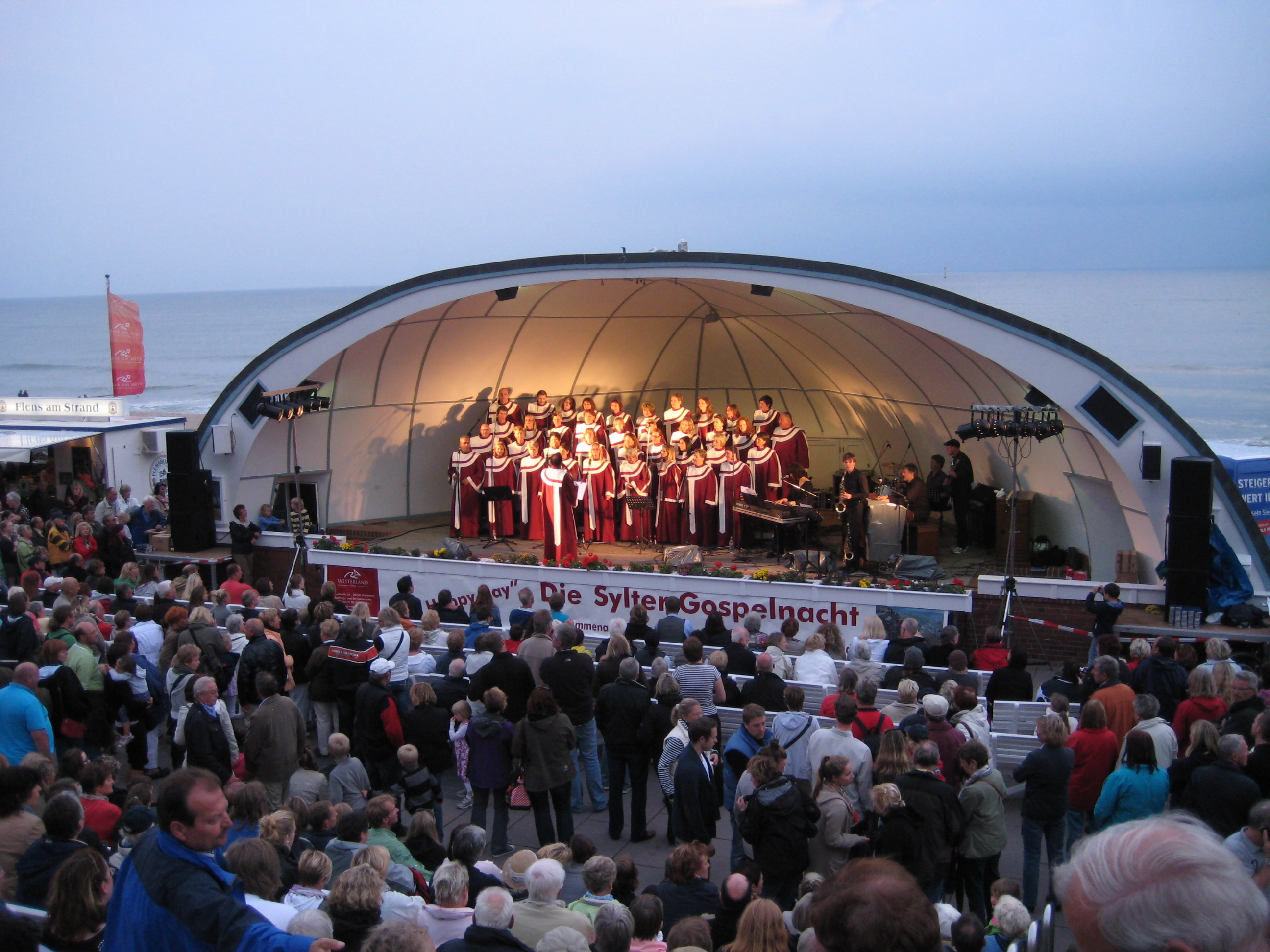
Bandshell on the beach promenade

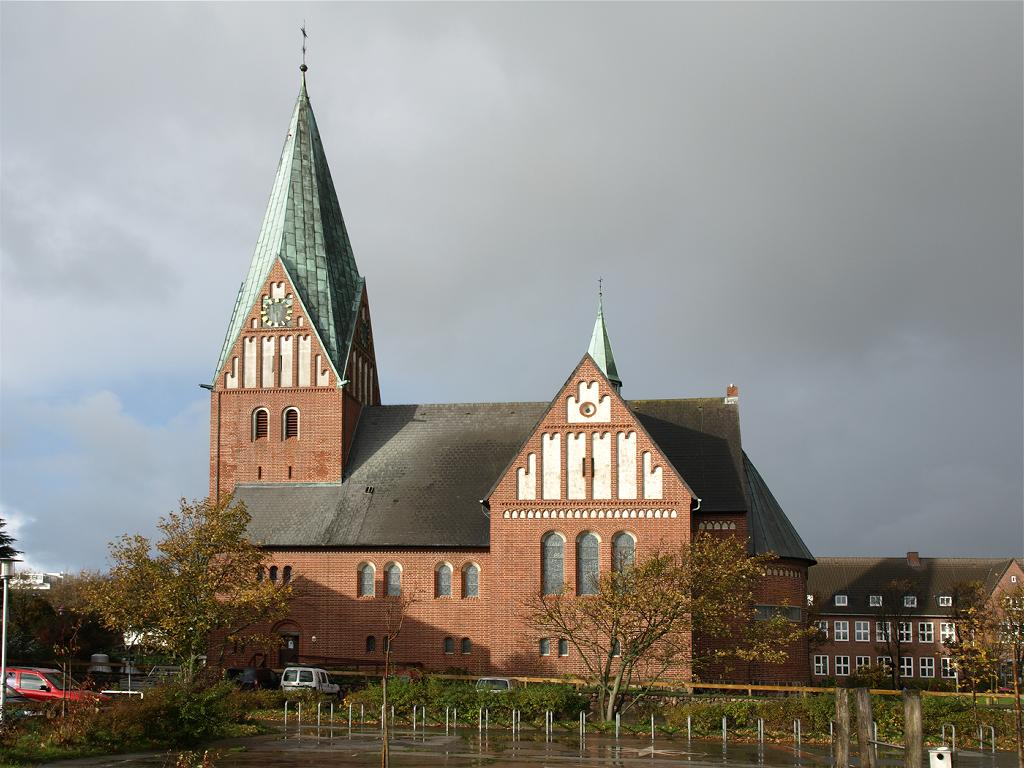
St. Nicolai church

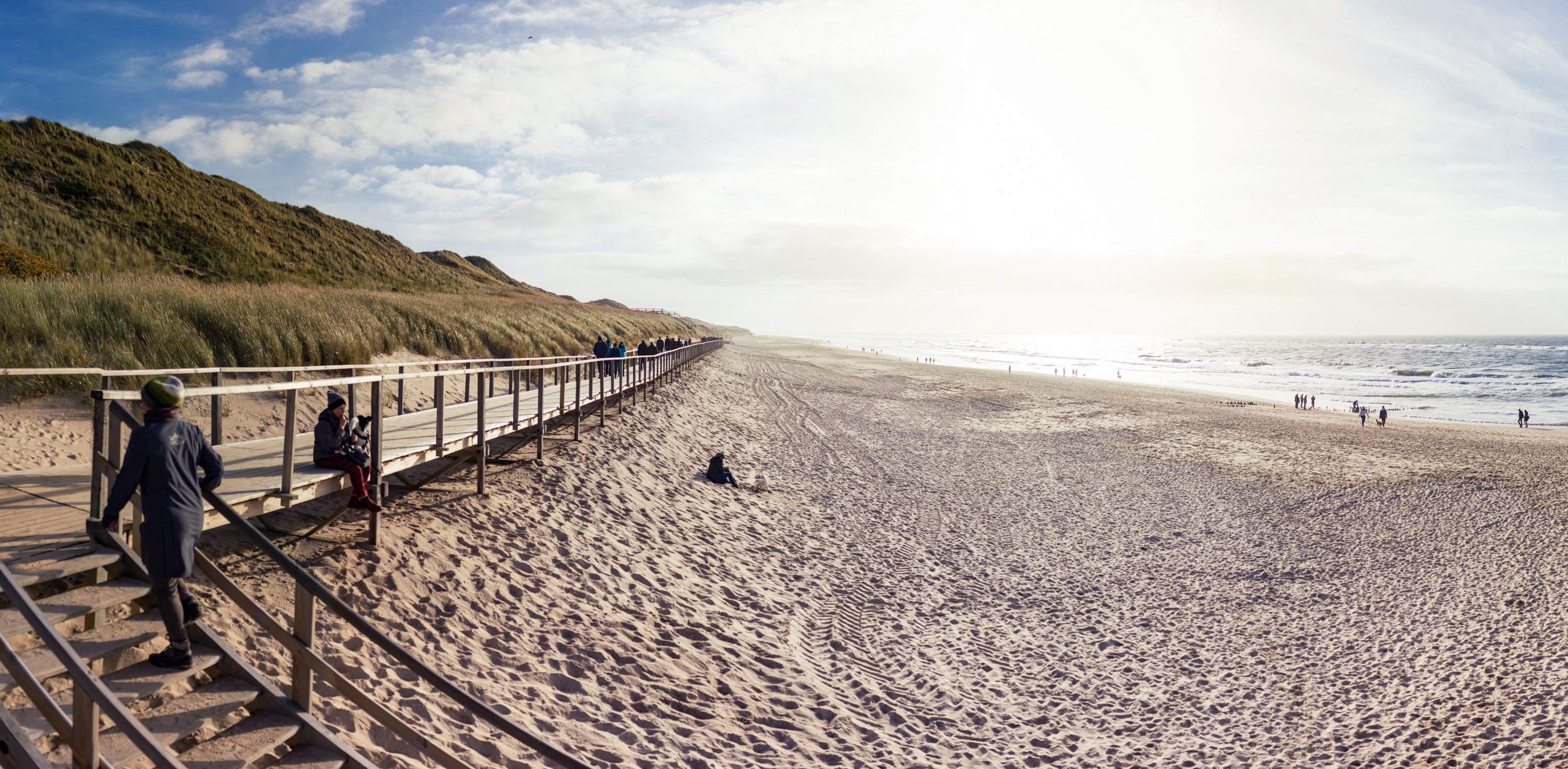
Westerland beach in the southern direction

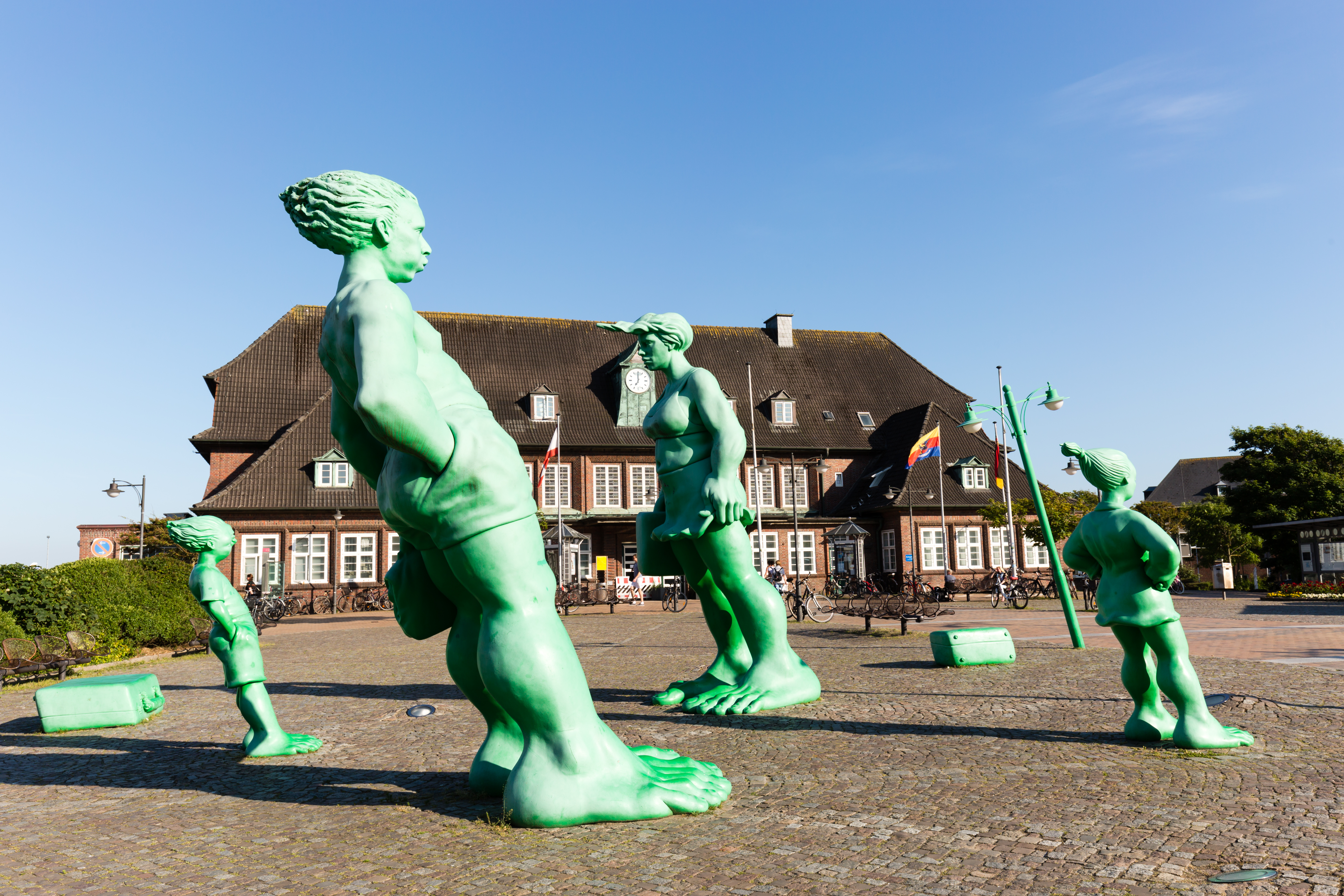
Railway Station of Westerland

The major attraction at Westerland is the beach and the 6-kilometre-long promenade with its Musikmuschel music pavilion. During the season, 4,000 Strandkörbe are placed on the beach.

Westerland today has 30 listed historic buildings and another 150 that are considered of special historic or architectural value. These include the Kurhaus from 1897, now housing the municipal administration and a casino.

Westerland features numerous sculptures, e.g. in the pedestrian zone such as Wilhelmine (Wilhelmsstrasse) or Sturmbläser and Europa on the promenade. Near the train station Reisende Riesen im Wind (by Martin Wolke) was created in 2001. The Westerländer Roland, which used to stand in front of the old town hall, was in storage from 1964 to 1993, but since then has stood in the centre of a roundabout.

Westerland has three churches:

- St. Niels, Protestant church, built in 1635-37.
- St. Nicolai (Westerland), Protestant church, consecrated in 1908.
- St. Christophorus, Roman Catholic church, built in 1997-99 to replace the previous structure dating from 1957. Prior to that, the Herz-Jesu-Kapelle (built in 1896) had stood in that location. Nearby is the Heimatstätte für Heimatlose, a small cemetery for victims of shipwrecks washed ashore between 1855 and 1905.

Sylter Welle was opened in 1993 as a spa and wellness centre, with indoor pool and sauna. Sylt Aquarium is a small aquarium in the south of Westerland.

== Government ==
On 1 January 2009, Westerland became part of the new municipality Gemeinde Sylt created by the merger of the town with the former municipalities Rantum and Sylt-Ost. The debate on this move had started in 2003 when a similar merger happened on Fehmarn. However, local rivalries and desire for independence prevented progress for a time. It took the foundation of a citizens' movement Bürger für Sylt als Einheit to advance the plan. In separate referendums in 2008, Westerland (by a large majority) and Sylt-Ost (narrowly) agreed to the merger in May 2008. Rantum followed, but List, Kampen, Wenningstedt-Braderup and Hörnum remained aloof. In September 2008 the merger contract was signed.

Although Westerland used to have the status of Stadt (city, awarded in 1905), the new municipality so far refrained from applying for this status. One reason is that the Ortsteile do not want to advertise their tourism services as simple suburbs (Stadtteile). As a result of this change, the coat of arms of Westerland was cancelled.

Westerland is now an Ortsteil of Gemeinde Sylt. Since 1 May 2015, the mayor of Gemeinde Sylt has been Nikolas Häckel.

Gemeinde Sylt shares its administration in a Verwaltungsgemeinschaft with the Amt Landschaft Sylt, located in the townhall of Westerland - the former Kurhaus, built in 1897.

== Infrastructure ==
=== Transport ===
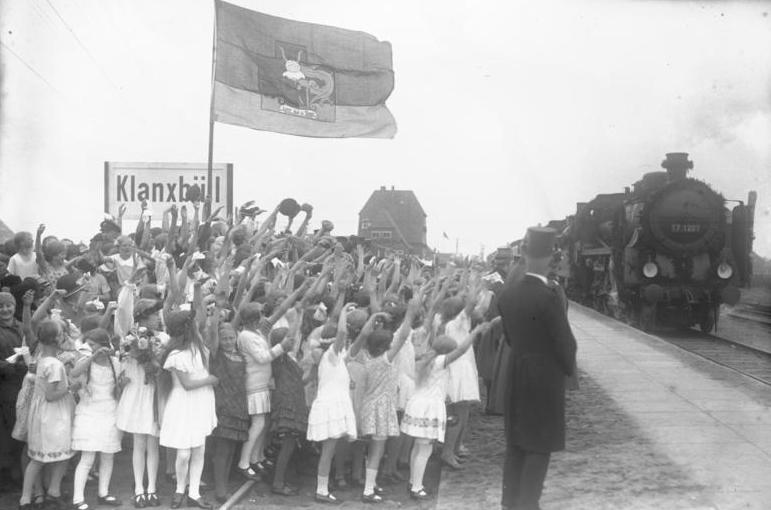
Inauguration of the new railway connecting Westerland with the mainland in 1927

Sylt, and thereby also Westerland, cannot be reached by road from the mainland. Instead, there is a shuttle train that carries cars, the Sylt-Shuttle, that runs between Niebüll and Westerland. The railway line, called the Marsh Railway (Marschbahn), runs across the 11.3 km-long Hindenburgdamm, a causeway across the Wadden Sea joining Sylt to the mainland. Passenger trains, both local and long-distance, also serve Westerland station, reaching it across the causeway. Westerland can also be reached by air through Sylt Airport, and by car ferry from the nearby Danish island of Rømø.

=== Other ===
T-Systems operates the Sender Westerland, a 90-metre radio mast located in the middle of the town.

== Notable people ==
- Uwe Dallmeier (born 27 August 1923 in Dithmarschen; died 19 November 1985), actor, died here at his residence.
- Heinz Reinefarth, a former SS Brigadeführer, who became mayor of Westerland in December 1951. Reinefarth was one of the officers who quelled the Warsaw Uprising in 1944 on the orders of Heinrich Himmler. Although Reinefarth's unit was responsible for the killing of thousands of civilians and the Polish authorities asked for his extradition, he was never charged with these atrocities. He died at Westerland in 1979.
- Jan-Phillip Tadsen (born 1988), politician

== Trivia ==
- A song by the German punk band Die Ärzte is named after Westerland.
