= Nauris Sējējs =

Latvian ice hockey player

- Born: 15 March 2001 (age 25) Karlovy Vary, Czech Republic
- Height: 6 ft 0 in (183 cm)
- Weight: 185 lb (84 kg; 13 st 3 lb)
- Position: Defence
- Shoots: Left
- NL team (P) Cur. team: Genève-Servette HC; HC La Chaux-de-Fonds (SL)
- National team: Latvia
- Playing career: 2021–present

Nauris Sējējs (born 15 March 2001) is a Latvian professional ice hockey player who is a defenceman for HC La Chaux-de-Fonds of the Swiss League (SL) as a prospect to Genève-Servette HC of the National League (NL).

== Playing career ==
On 6 April 2021, Sējējs was signed by Genève-Servette HC to his first professional contract, agreeing to a one-year deal.

On 5 May 2021, it was announced that Sējējs would be loaned to HC La Chaux-de-Fonds of the Swiss League (SL) for the 2021–22 season.

== Personal life ==
His twin brother, Nils Sējējs, also plays professional ice hockey with Genève-Servette HC as a forward. They were born in the Czech Republic where their father Normunds was playing ice hockey at the time, though the family returned to Latvia within a few years.

Both twins left Latvia and moved to Geneva in 2016 at age 15 to continue their junior careers.

== Career statistics ==
=== Regular season and playoffs ===
			Regular season					Playoffs
Season	Team	League	GP	G	A	Pts	PIM	GP	G	A	Pts	PIM
2015–16	Dinamo Rīga	LAT U16	26	13	17	30	48	—	—	—	—	—
2016–17	Genève–Servette HC	SUI U17	37	3	12	15	16	4	2	0	2	2
2017–18	Genève–Servette HC	SUI U17	32	2	20	22	26	7	1	3	4	2
2018–19	Genève–Servette HC	SUI U20	44	4	8	12	12	10	0	0	0	2
2019–20	Genève–Servette HC	SUI.2 U20	44	6	24	30	10	4	0	3	3	2
2020–21	Genève–Servette HC	SUI.2 U20	45	7	29	36	12	—	—	—	—	—
2021–22	HC La Chaux–de–Fonds	SUI.2	40	3	7	10	6	11	0	1	1	2
SUI.2 totals			40	3	7	10	6	11	0	1	1	2

=== International ===
Year	Team	Event	GP	G	A	Pts	PIM
2018	Latvia	WJC18 D1A	5	0	0	0	0
2019	Latvia	WJC18	5	0	0	0	0
2022	Latvia	OG	1	0	0	0	0
Junior totals			10	0	0	0	0
Senior totals			1	0	0	0	0
