= Yule (disambiguation) =

Yule is an ancient Germanic holiday sometimes conflated with Christmas.

Yule may also refer to:

== People ==
- Yule (surname), a surname and list of people with the name
- Yule F. Kilcher (1913–1998), Swiss-born American politician and homesteader

== Places ==
- Yule Peak, Graham Land, Antarctica
- Yule Bay, Victoria Land, Antarctica
- Yule River, Western Australia
- Yule Island, Papua New Guinea

== Other uses ==
- Yule (Middle-earth), a fictional holiday in the works of J. R. R. Tolkien

== See also ==
- Yul (disambiguation)
- Jul (disambiguation)
