= Jugul =

- Village
- Location in Karnataka, India Jugul (India)
- Coordinates: 16.72°N 75.06°E
- Country: India
- State: Karnataka
- District: Belagavi
- Talukas: Kagwad

Population (2001)
  - Total: 8,955

Languages
  - Official: Kannada
- Time zone: UTC+5:30 (IST)

Jugul is a village in the southern state of Karnataka, India. It is located in Athani taluk of Belagavi district in Karnataka.

== Demographics ==
Jugul is a village in situated in southern part of India and north part of Karnataka State. Postal code of Jugul is 591242. Jugul sets its land with river Krishna also called Krishnamata. It shares another side of river with Maharashtra (Khidrapur) by boats.

As of 2001 India census, Jugul had a population of 8955 with 4531 males and 4424 females. It consists of separate government primary schools for boys and girls and also has an Urdu primary school. The village has only one high school i.e., Karnataka Shikshan Samiti Proud Shale (KSSHS).

== Bank ==
Jugul has only one nationalized bank i.e., Syndicate Bank which was started in 1972.

== Schools ==
- Sarakari Hiriya Prathmik Shale
- Urdu primary school
- Karnataka Shikshan Samiti Prathmik Shale (KSSPS)
- Karnataka Shikshan Samiti High School (KSSHS)

== See also ==
- Belgaum
- Districts of Karnataka
