= Nils Sējējs =

Latvian ice hockey player

- Born: 15 March 2001 (age 24); Karlovy Vary, Czech Republic
- Height: 5 ft 11.4 in (181 cm)
- Weight: 190 lb (86 kg; 13 st 8 lb)
- Position: Forward
- Shoots: Left
- NL team (P) Cur. team: Genève-Servette HC; HC La Chaux-de-Fonds (SL)
- National team: Latvia
- Playing career: 2021–present

Nils Sējējs (born 15 March 2001) is a Latvian professional ice hockey forward for HC La Chaux-de-Fonds of the Swiss League (SL) as a prospect to Genève-Servette HC of the National League (NL).

== Playing career ==
On 6 April 2021, Sējējs was signed by Genève-Servette HC to his first professional contract, agreeing to a one-year deal.

On 5 May 2021, it was announced that Sējējs would be loaned to HC La Chaux-de-Fonds of the Swiss League (SL) for the 2021–22 season.

== Personal life ==
His twin brother, Nauris Sējējs, also plays professional ice hockey for Genève-Servette HC as a defenceman. They were born in the Czech Republic where their father Normunds was playing ice hockey at the time, though the family returned to Latvia within a few years.

Both twins left Latvia and moved to Geneva in 2016 at age 15 to continue their junior careers.
