= Yul (name) =

Yul is a given name and surname. Notable people with the name include:

== Given name ==
- Yul Anderson (1958–2021), American pianist, guitarist and singer
- Yul Arzú (born 1986), Honduran football goalkeeper
- Yul Brynner (1920–1985), Russian-American actor
- Yul Bürkle (born 1974), Venezuelan actor and model
- Yul Edochie (born 1982), Nigerian actor
- Yul Kwon (born 1975), Korean-American television personality
- Yul Moldauer (born 1996), American artistic gymnast
- Yul Vazquez (born 1965), Cuban-American actor

== Yul as a given name in Korea ==
- Choi Yul (born 1949), South Korean activist, environmentalist and organizer
- Kwon Yul (1537–1599), Korean general
- Kwon Yul (actor), stage name of Korean actor Kwon Se-in (born 1982)
