= Peter Jull =

Peter Jull is a Canadian political scientist and academic who has specialised and advised in Commonwealth constitutional politics, particularly in relation to peoples indigenous to Canada and Australia.

== Canadian period ==
From 1968 to 1980, Jull worked in the Canadian Privy Council Office's Federal-Provincial Relations Office as assistant secretary to the Prime Minister's cabinet committee on constitutional and other national issues, and as adviser on the Constitution vis-à-vis northern territories and indigenous peoples. He was also cabinet secretary in the province of British Columbia, 1976–77, during the formation of a new provincial government's cabinet business system.

Since 1980, Jull has been an adviser to many official and non-governmental entities, writing many reports, articles, and papers. He worked, for instance, as political and constitutional adviser to international, national, and regional Inuit organisations from 1980 to 1987, including heading the secretariat supporting the Nunavut constitutional project, and working in the Inuit constitutional team which won significant national constitutional amendments in the 1980-83 period.

== Australian work ==
Since 1987, in Australia, he has worked as a consultant to indigenous official bodies and NGOs, and federal and state government entities. He has continued to act as a consultant to governments and indigenous NGOs in Canada and the northern hemisphere.

He joined the Australian Centre for Peace and Conflict Studies in 2004. Prior to that, he was Adjunct Associate Professor and course lecturer in the School of Political Science and International Studies, University of Queensland, and earlier Senior Research Fellow at the Australian National University's North Australia Research Unit in Darwin.

== Publications ==
- Jull, Peter, "Nunavut or None of it?", Arena Magazine No. 36. (Aug-Sep 1998) pp 21–22. Accessed 16 February 2009.
