= Julemanden =

Danish Christmas figure

Julemanden (Faroese: Jólamaður [ˈjɔuːlaˌmɛaːvʊɹ], Greenlandic: Juulimaaq) is the Christmas gift-bringer in modern Danish culture, the equivalent of Father Christmas or Santa Claus. Julemanden can be directly translated as "The Yule Man" or "The Christmas Man". Julemanden is often illustrated as a short, bearded man dressed in gray clothes and a red hat. He is said to bring presents on Christmas Eve (December 24), coming to houses either by foot or by sleigh, and often wears fur to keep him warm.

== History ==
The roots of Julemanden reach into Danish folklore and mythology. However, the character is a relatively new phenomenon in Denmark, appearing some time after World War II (1939–1945). Until then, there was nissefar, nissekongen or julenissen – a character with some resemblance to the modern julemand. This tradition can be traced back centuries, when people believed in nisser (elves, leprechauns, spirits or mystical entities rarely or never seen directly). Local folklore dictated the expected actions of the nisser, which could be moody creatures resulting in all kinds of fortunes or even disasters.

The role of the julenisse was to bring good fortune to the family and to achieve this, he would have to be treated well especially around jul (Yule, in December). This was achieved by feeding him, traditionally with some form of porridge (now rice porridge). Traditionally, the porridge was to be placed in the household attic as this was said to be the place where the nisse supposedly lived and if the nisse was satisfied with the meal he would bring good fortune to the household in the coming year.

The julenisse is still, however, "celebrated" and he acts as a stand-in for julemanden in early December, to entertain the childish mind, bring small gifts and sometimes plays tricks on the household, kindergarten etc. where such "creatures" can prosper.

== In popular culture ==
The gift-giving nisse that became nissekongen seems to have drawn influences from the American Santa, when American culture began making an impact in Denmark, but rather than outright copying him, local traditions were tweaked, eventually resulting in a Father Christmas-type character with only traces of the original nisse and in some respects indistinguishable from Santa.

In an attempt to attract more than 800,000 tourists, the Tivoli theme park in Copenhagen replaced their julemanden display to that of its Russian counterpart, Father Frost, in 2011.

== Postal address ==
In Denmark a special postal address is used by Post Danmark for children who want to write to julemanden:

Rensdyrvej 1
Postboks 2412
1566 København V

Rensdyrvej translates as 'Reindeer Way', while the PO Box number 2412 is a reference to 24 December.
