= All Saints' Day Flood of 1436 =

German bight natural disaster

The All Saints Day Flood of 1436 (German: Allerheiligenflut) on All Saints' Day (1 November) in 1436 was a storm tide that hit the entire North Sea coast of the German Bight.

In the North Frisian village of Tetenbüll alone 180 people died. Eidum on the island of Sylt was destroyed, its inhabitants left and founded the village of Westerland as a result. List on Sylt was also abandoned after the floods and rebuilt further west. Dykes burst along the river Oste and in Kehdingen. The island of Pellworm was separated from neighbouring Nordstrand and only diked again in 1550.
