= Emma Sarepta Yule =

American educator

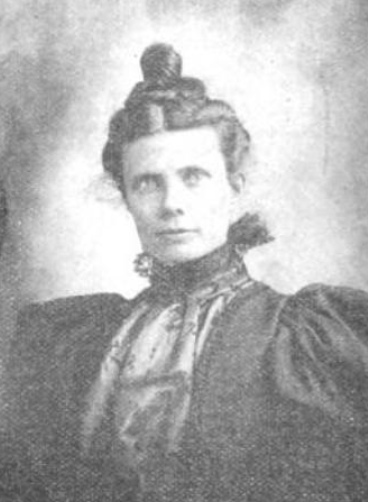
- Emma Sarepta Yule, from an 1897 publication
- Born: March 25, 1863; Cedar County, Iowa, U.S.
- Died: April 16, 1939 (age 76); Los Angeles, California, U.S.
- Occupation(s): Educator, writer

Emma Sarepta Yule (March 25, 1863 – April 16, 1939) was an American educator and writer. She is remembered as the first schoolteacher in Everett, Washington; she was superintendent of Everett school from 1897 to 1900. She later taught in Alaska, and was an English professor at the University of the Philippines for 27 years. She wrote three illustrated books about Japan. In 2020, a park in Everett was named for Yule.

== Early life and education ==
Yule was born in Iowa, one of the sixteen children of Samuel Yule. She was the last child of his first wife, Sarepta Elvira Clark Yule, who died in childbirth. Her father was born in Scotland, and an abolitionist; the family's farm was a safe stop on the Underground Railroad. She graduated from Iowa State Teachers College in Cedar Falls in 1886.

== Career ==
Yule was a "pioneer teacher", principal, and superintendent of schools in Everett, Washington, from 1891 to 1900, and in Juneau, Alaska, between 1900 and 1910. She was a professor of English at the University of the Philippines for 27 years, before she retired in 1937.

== Publications ==
Yule's articles about the Philippines, Japan, China, and Korea were published in Mid-Pacific Magazine, Scribner's Monthly, Current History, American Speech, and other English-language periodicals. She was editor of The Philippine Agriculturist, a campus publication.

- An introduction to the study of colonial history, for use in secondary schools (1912)
- "The Virgin of Antipolo" (1914)
- "Carriers of Light and Laughter" (1917)
- "Some Superstitions and Customs of the Filipino Farmers" (1919)
- "The Boys' Festival in Japan" (1920)
- "Filipino Feminism" (1920)
- "Rice Growing as Portrayed in Chinese Art" (1921)
- "Japan's New Woman" (1921)
- "Miss China" (1922)
- "The Young Women Rebels of Korea" (1923)
- "Christmas in the Philippines" (1923)
- "Down the Rapids: Week End Trip to Pagsanjan Gorge and Falls" (1925)
- Preparation of Scientific and Technical Papers (1925, with Sam Farlow Trelease)
- "The English Language in the Philippines" (1925)
- Stories from Japanese History for Boys and Girls (1926)
- In Kimono Land (1927)
- In Japan: Without Clock or Calendar (1935)

== Personal life and legacy ==
Yule died in 1939, in Los Angeles, at the age of 76. She left money for a women's scholarship fund at the University of Washington. In 2020, a city park in Everett was named for Yule; Emma Yule Park opened in 2022.
