= Jul =

Jul most commonly refers to:

- July, as an abbreviation for the seventh month of the year in the Gregorian calendar

Jul or JUL may also refer to:

== Celebrations ==
- Jul, Scandinavian and Germanic word for Yule
- Jul (Denmark), the Danish Yule or Christmas celebration
- Jul (Norway), the Norwegian Yule or Christmas celebration
- Jul (Sweden), the Swedish Yule or Christmas celebration

== Music ==
- Jul (rapper), French hip hop artist, singer, rapper. Name stylized as JUL
- "Jul" (song), 1983 Christmas single by Ralf Peeker
- Jul (Carola Søgaard album), 1991 Christmas album by Loa Falkman
- Jul (Loa Falkman album), 2013 Christmas album by Loa Falkman

== Other uses ==
- Inca Manco Capac International Airport (IATA code)
- jul, ISO 639-3 of the Jirel language
- Yugoslav Left (Serbo-Croatian: Jugoslovenska Levica), a former political party of Serbia
- Jul (writer)

== See also ==
- Yule (disambiguation)
- Juul (disambiguation)
- Joule, a unit of energy
- "Jul, jul, strålande jul", Christmas song
- Jul, jul, strålande jul (disambiguation)
- Jull
