= Jewel Records =

Jewel Records may refer to:

- Jewel Records (Cincinnati record label), run by Rusty York
- Jewel Records (New York record label), a subsidiary of Plaza Music Company, 1927 to 1932
- Jewel Records (Shreveport record label), founded by Stan Lewis in 1963
- Jewel Records, also known as "Je–Wel", a 1950s label in Odessa, Texas, run by Weldon Rogers
- Jewel Records (Hollywood record label), founded by Ben Pollack
