= HDMS Niels Juel =

Four ships of the Danish Royal Navy have borne the name HDMS Niels Juel:

- HDMS Niels Juel (1856) (1856–1879), a 42-gun steam frigate
- HDMS Niels Juel (1918) (1923−1943), a coastal defense ship scuttled by her crew after a Luftwaffe attack in 1943. The vessel was later refloated as Nordland
- HDMS Niels Juel (F354) (1980−2009), a multi-purpose corvette from the Cold War and of the eponymous Niels Juel class
- HDMS Niels Juel (F363) (2010–present), a frigate and third member of the current Iver Huitfeldt class in service with the Danish Royal Navy

== See also ==
- Niels Juel
- Niels Juel-class corvette (launched late 1970s) of the Danish Navy
- Juel (disambiguation)
