= St. Niels =

Church in Westerland, Germany

Coordinates: 54°54′27″N 8°19′00″E

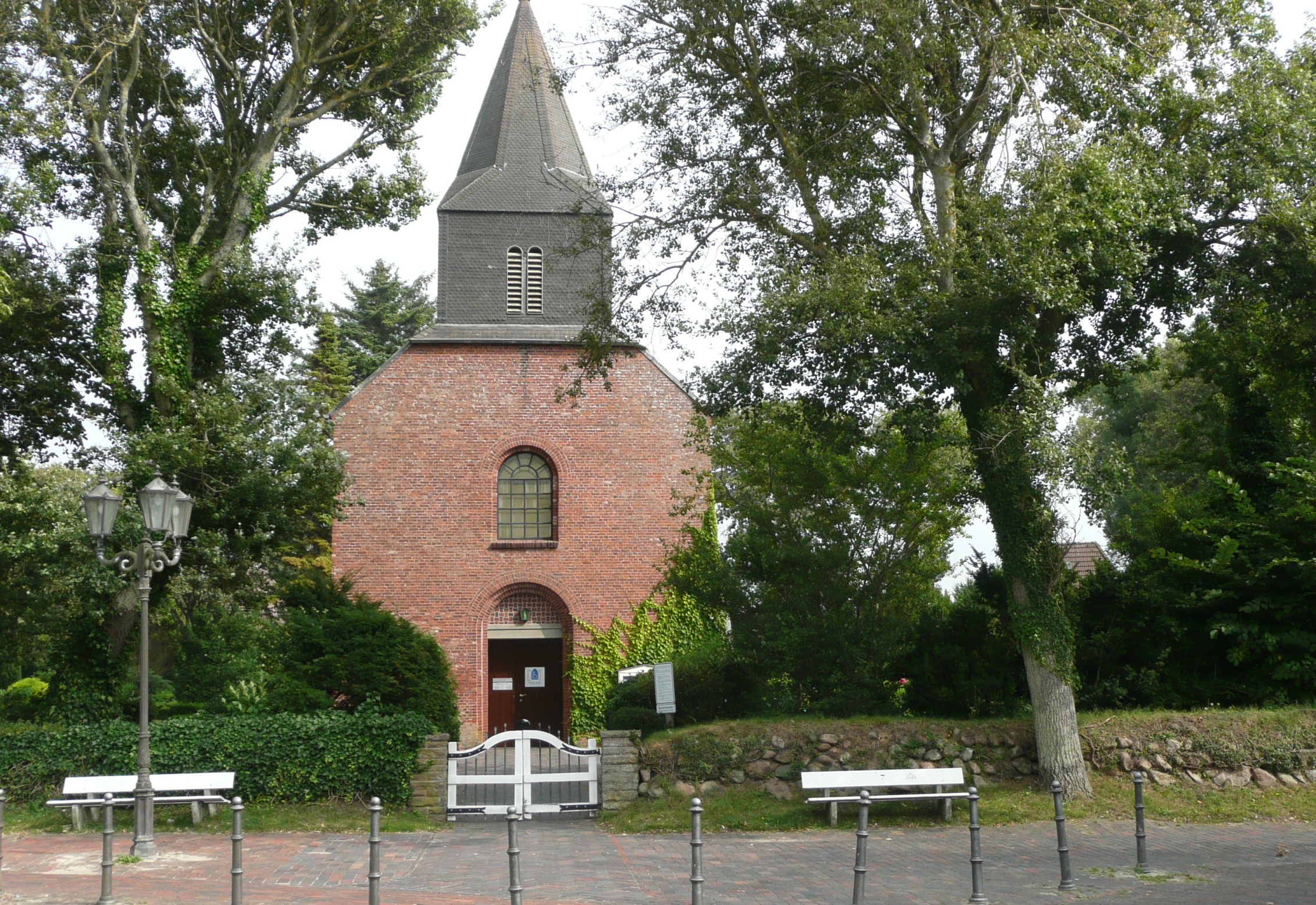
A view of St. Niels from the front

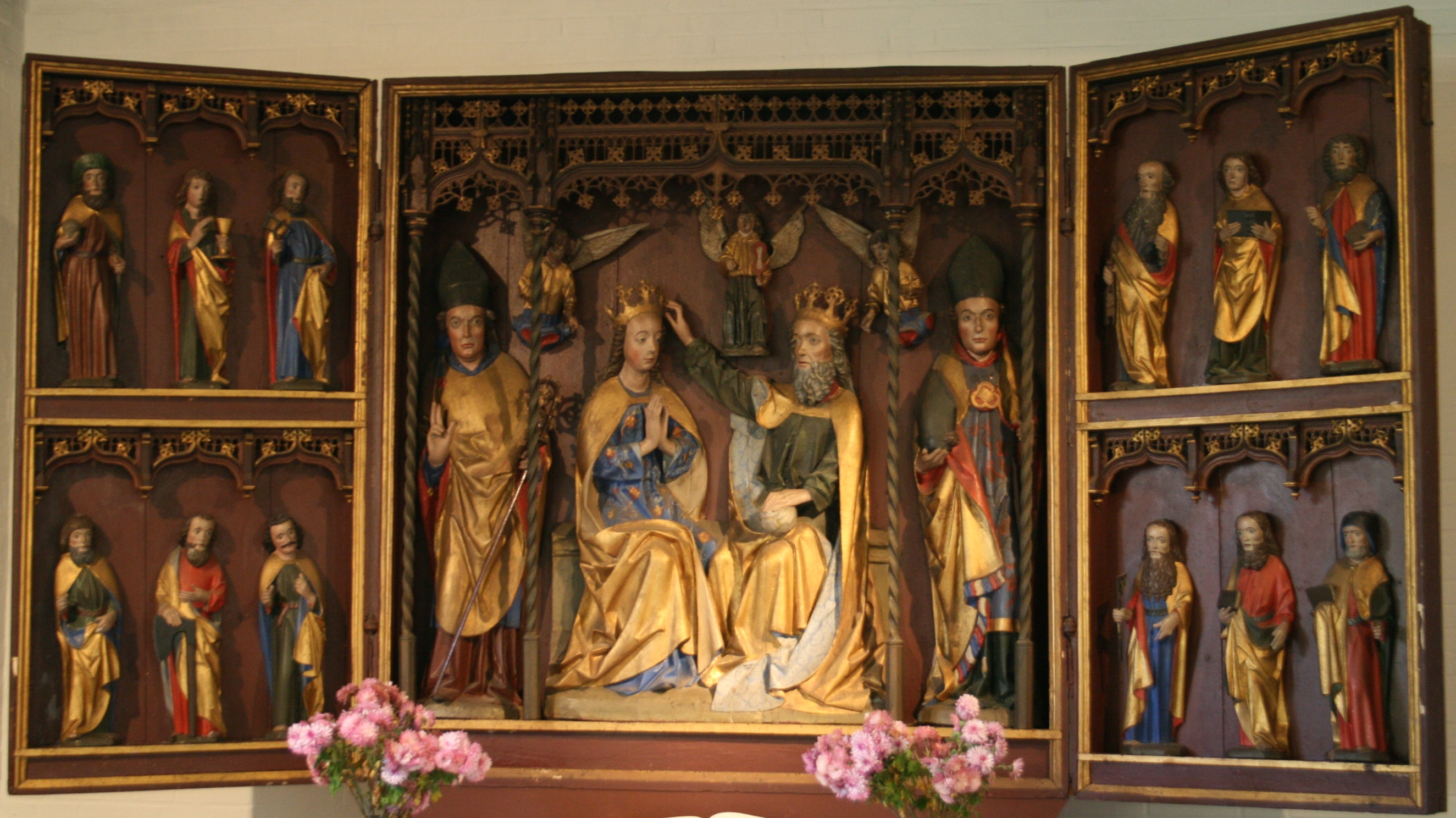
Gothic carved triptych

St. Niels is a Lutheran church in Westerland, a seaside resort on the German island of Sylt. Built in 1634 and consecrated in 1637 it is the city’s oldest building and home to a congregation within the Evangelical Lutheran Church in Northern Germany. The church is dedicated to Saint Nicholas, on Sylt called Niels.

== Artworks ==
St. Niels has a crucifix from the 13th or 14th century. Its corpus is dated the second half of the 15th century. St. Niels’ gothic carved triptych shows the coronation of Virgin Mary in its middle shrine accompanied by the bishops Nicholas or Severin on its right and Dionysius on its left side. The altar wings contain figures of the apostles. A chandelier with 14 arms is dated 1682 while a brass candlestick with 8 arms is probably older.

== Organ ==
The organ made by the organ workshop Marcussen & Søn was installed in 1875. A new one, using the old pipes, was built by Kemper & Sohn in 1965/1966. During a renovation of St. Niehls in 1987 the organ was refurbished by the company Neuthor (Kiel) substituting the organ stops Quinte 1 1/3 by Krummhorn 8.
