= Synergy Sports Technology =

American basketball analytics company

- Founded: 2004
- Purpose: Sports Technology
- Key people: Garrick Barr (Founder/CEO); Nils Lahr (Co-Founder/CTO)
- Website: www.synergysportstech.com

Synergy Sports Technology is an American company specializing in basketball analytics designed for scouting, player development, and entertainment purposes.

== Overview ==
Synergy's analysts and automated camera tracking systems monitor and catalog player actions in 75,000 basketball games a year. The company then analyzes the data, producing analyses across indicators including play types, player behaviors and game situations. The company provides analyses in various forms, such as diagrams of play calls and custom APIs.

Synergy's NBA archives span back to the 2004 season. After being named as the Most Valuable Player at the 2013 NBA All-Star Game, Chris Paul credited Synergy with improving his performances.

Synergy collaborates with basketball leagues including the NBA, WNBA, NCAA Division I, FIBA as well as sports media and marketing companies such as ESPN, ABC Sports, Turner Sports, and EA Sports.

== History ==
Founder and CEO, Garrick Barr began developing the technologies that evolved into Synergy Sports Technology in 1992 when he transitioned from college basketball coach to assistant coach and video coordinator for the NBA's Phoenix Suns. Barr first worked with engineers to develop a digital post-production editing system to speed up collecting, cataloging, and editing hundreds of hours of game film used for training. While the resulting technology achieved its goal, it still required teams to compile, edit and tag the footage.

Barr then sought to create technology to instantly produce advanced analytics that would use the company’s existing work in video logging and tagging. Along with friend Scott Mossman, Barr founded Quantified Scouting Service (QSS) in 1998. QSS produced computer-generated reports – accessible by teams through dial-up technology – revealed every player’s offensive tendencies.

In 2004, Barr renamed the company Synergy Sports Technology and brought in computer scientist Nils Lahr. Barr and Lahr developed the breakthrough application software and streaming media technology that allowed loggers to undertake the rapid video-data syncing and upload that laid the foundation for Synergy’s success.

In 2008, Synergy reached multi-year licensing agreement with the National Basketball Association to give NBA.com, NBA.tv, and the NBA’s television partners access to Synergy products and services. The same year, the company also announced a partnership with EA Sports to incorporate Synergy’s data into its NBA Live franchise.

In 2021, it was acquired by Sportradar.
