= Joule (surname) =

Joule is a surname. Notable people with the surname include:

- Barry Joule (born 1954/55), Canadian writer
- James Prescott Joule (1818–1889), physicist and brewer
- John Joule, chemist
- Reggie Joule (born 1952), politician

Fictional characters:

- Yzak Joule, in the anime series Mobile Suit Gundam SEED
- Joule Adams, in ReCore
