= Niels =

Niels is a male given name, equivalent to Nicholas, which is common in Denmark, Belgium, Norway (formerly) and the Netherlands. The Norwegian and Swedish variant is Nils. The name is a developed short form of Nicholas or Greek Nikolaos, after Saint Nicholas. Its pet form is Nisse, and female variants are Nielsine, Nielsina, and Nielsa.

Notable people with the name include:

- Niels, King of Denmark (1065–1134)
- Niels, Count of Halland (died 1218)
- Niels Aagaard (1612–1657), Danish poet
- Niels Aall (1769–1854), Norwegian businessman and politician
- Niels Henrik Abel (1802–1829), Norwegian mathematician
- Niels Arestrup (1949–2024), French-Danish actor and director
- Niels Viggo Bentzon (1919–2000), Danish composer and pianist
- Niels Bohr (1885–1962), Danish physicist and Nobel Prize recipient
- Niels Busk (born 1942), Danish politician
- Niels Ebbesen (died 1340), Danish squire and national hero
- Niels Nikolaus Falck (1784–1850), Danish jurist and historian
- Niels Feijen (born 1977), Dutch pool player
- Niels Ferguson (born 1965), Dutch cryptographer
- Niels Ryberg Finsen (1860–1904), Danish physician and Nobel Prize recipient
- Niels Friis (died 1508), Roman Catholic prelate and bishop of Viborg, succeeding Niels Glob
- Niels Gade (1817–1890), Danish musician
- Niels Giffey (born 1991), German basketball player
- Niels Glob, Roman Catholic prelate and bishop of Viborg (1478–1498)
- Niels Hemmingsen (1513–1600), Danish theologian
- Niels Hintermann (born 1995), Swiss alpine ski racer
- Niels Holst-Sørensen (1922–2023), Danish athlete and general
- Niels Lauritz Høyen (1798–1870), Danish art historian
- Niels Hansen Jacobsen (1861–1941), Danish sculptor
- Niels Kaj Jerne (1911–1994), Danish immunologist and Nobel Prize recipient
- Niels Jonsson Stromberg af Clastorp (1646–1723), Swedish soldier and politician
- Niels Juel (1629–1697), Danish admiral
- Niels Kaas (1535–1594), Danish politician
- Niels Christian Kaldau (born 1974), Danish badminton player
- Niels Krabbe (born 1951), Danish ornithologist
- Niels Lan Doky (born 1963), Danish jazz pianist
- Niels de Langen (born 1998), Dutch para-alpine skier
- Niels McDonald (born 2008), German tennis player
- Niels Meyn (1891–1957), Danish author
- Niels Neergaard (1854–1936), Danish historian and politician
- Niels-Henning Ørsted Pedersen (1946–2005), Danish jazz bassist
- Niels Petersen (gymnast) (1885–1961), Danish gymnast
- Niels Helveg Petersen (1939–2017), Danish politician
- Niels Schneider (born 1987), Canadian actor
- Niels Steensen, also known as Niels Steensen (1638–1686), Danish scientist and Catholic bishop
- Niels Tas (born 1983), Belgian politician
- Niels Treschow (1751–1833), Norwegian philosopher and politician
- Niels van den Berge (born 1984), Dutch politician
- Niels van der Zwan (born 1967), Dutch rower
- Niels van Steenis (born 1969), Dutch rower
- Niels Verschaeren (born 1991), Belgian para-cyclist
- Niels Vink (born 2002), Dutch champion wheelchair tennis player

== See also ==
- Neil
- Nicholas
- Niel (disambiguation)
- Nils
