= Artur Erikson =

Swedish singer and preacher

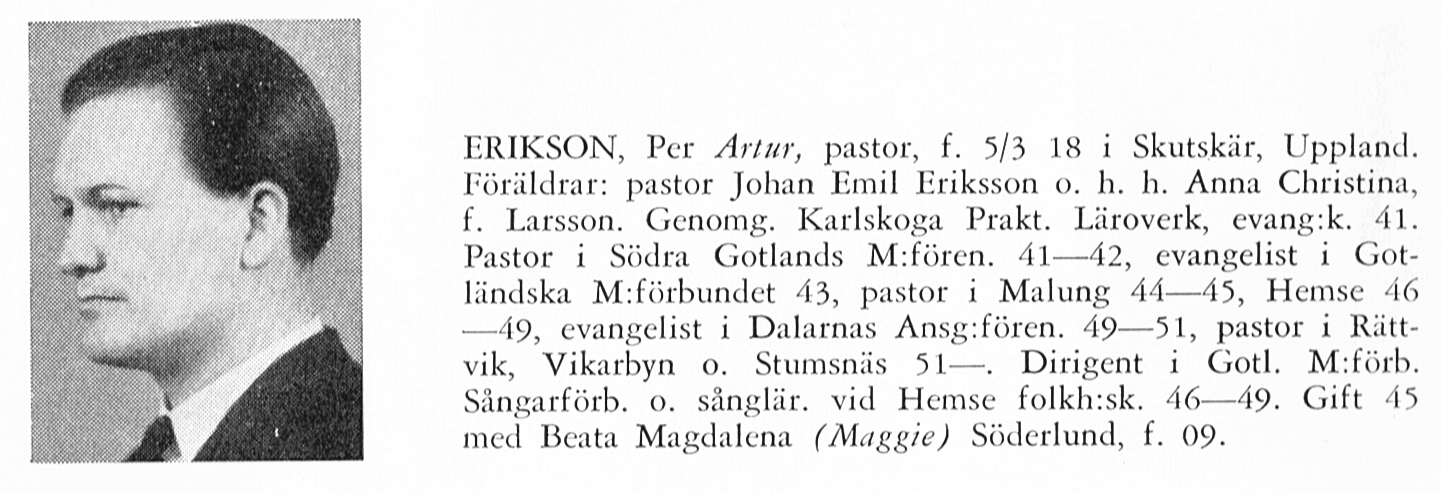

Background information
- Birth name: Per Artur Eriksson
- Born: 5 March 1918; Skutskär, Sweden
- Died: 5 August 2000 (aged 82); Gagnef, Sweden
- Genres: Christian music
- Occupation(s): singer, preacher
- Instrument: piano

Per Artur Erikson (5 March 1918 – 5 August 2000) was a Swedish singer and preacher, active within the Mission Covenant Church of Sweden. As well as Christian songs, he also sang songs where Dan Andersson's poems had been set to music. His most successful release was "Till min syster", which featured in the top 10-chart Svensktoppen for 12 weeks in 1970.
