= Jewells =

Jewells may refer to:

- Jewell (disambiguation)
- Jewells, New South Wales, Australia
- Jewells, California, former name of Jewell, California, United States
- Jewells, a British jewellery retailer
