= John C. Yuille =

Canadian psychologist (born 1941)

John C. Yuille (born December 1, 1941, in Montreal, Quebec) was a Canadian psychologist whose research interests include forensic psychology, victim and witness memory, suspect memory, trauma and memory, stress and memory, child sexual abuse, interview techniques, serial crimes, and credibility assessment.

== Biography ==
John C. Yuille was born December 1, 1941, in Montreal, Quebec, and died July 23, 2017. He attended the University of Western Ontario, receiving his Bachelor of Arts in 1964, his master's in 1965, and his Ph.D. in 1967. He was a teaching assistant and postdoctoral fellow at McGill University from 1967 to 1968. He was an assistant professor (1968–1973), then an associate professor (1973–1986), and eventually a full professor at the University of British Columbia (1986–2006). He was a visiting professor at the University of Salzburg in Austria from 1974 to 1975. He served as a visiting lecturer at the British Columbia Police College from 1976 to 1991. He was also a visiting consultant at the Family Life Development Division at Cornell University from 1990 to 1991. He is now a professor emeritus at the University of British Columbia and the chief executive officer of the Pacific Alliance of Forensic Scientists and Practitioners, Ltd. Yuille has a private forensic practice, provides regular training on interviewing and credibility assessment for individuals working in law enforcement, lawyers, judges, and child protection workers, and has served as an expert witness in family, criminal, and civil court for over 30 years.

== Contributions to psychology and beyond ==
Yuille is best known for his work with eyewitness research from the 1980s and beyond. Along with partner Judith Daylen, Yuille's research focuses on studying eyewitnesses as they exist in the real world, not just as they appear to work in simulated situations in labs. Yuille emphasizes that this type of work is especially important because while there are plenty of hypothetical, lab-constructed studies of eyewitness memory, "...The variances and covariances among variables that infiltrate actual eyewitness cases are controlled or 'randomized out' in experimental research in ways that can make generalization from experiments to actual cases a risky endeavour under certain circumstances." Yuille has also done other notable studies on law enforcement training, the use of expert witnesses in court to determine credibility of eyewitness accounts, and assessment of children's testimony in court.
