= Jewell, California =

Jewell
- Former Settlement
- Location in California Jewell (the United States)
- Coordinates: 38°02′12″N 122°44′45″W
- Country: United States
- State: California
- County: Marin
- Elevation: 79 ft (24 m)

Jewell was an unincorporated community in Marin County, California, United States. It was located 11 miles (18 km) west-southwest of Novato.

In the 1860s, the site was a dairy and pig farm owned by Omar Jewell. When the Northwestern Pacific Railroad was built nearby, Jewell sold a right-of-way across his land and a flagstop called Jewells was set up on the ranch. In the 1930s, a strip of land between Lagunitas Creek and the Sir Francis Drake Highway was subdivided into small lots where city dwellers built weekend cottages. The settlement became known as Jewell because it lay opposite of the Jewell train flagstop.

The National Park Service bought the community alongside the creek and removed the few remaining residents. In 2018, an environmental group tore down the cluster of houses and began to restore the creek to improve the habitat for endangered coho salmon.
