= Jouault =

The Jouault family was of Germanic origins from Gaud-Wault. The earliest records of the family are in Parigny, Loire (France), and date to 8 June 1511. Jouault is mentioned in a contract with Lord Parigny.

== 1770 to 1830 ==
Nicholas Jouault was born in Granville and buried there. During his life, he served Napoleon as an officer and was awarded the Medaille du Helene.

Julian André Jouault was the son of Pierre Philippe and Rosalie Sibron. He was born in Granville in 1805 and died there on 18 March 1879. He moved to St Helier, Jersey and became a partner with Edward Gallichan. The partnership owned small vessels and was involved in trading from Jersey to the United Kingdom, and returning with coal to Granville. Julian later became an agent of the London and South Western Railway and Lloyd's of London in Granville where he returned in the 1850s. At this time he lost a vessel with his eldest son on board: the 60 ton President sunk on her maiden voyage off Flamborough Head in the North Sea, and his mother died in Granville.

== 1840–1889 ==
Louis Jouault, son of Julien Andre, and agent for the London and South Western Railway in Granville, was mentioned in despatches as an officer and flag bearer in the Franco Prussian war.

== 1885–1956 ==
Jean Louis Jouault son of Louis was commissioned into the Royal Garrison Artillery as a 2nd Lieutenant on 1 October 1917. He was promoted to Lieutenant on 1 April 1919 and left the Army in 1921, after receiving the Croix de Guerre. He was the purchasing agent for Jersey during the occupation of the Channel Islands, operating from Les Hirondelles in Granville. He was arrested and released in occupied Paris when he paid at a cafe with sterling. During the German occupation of France, he assisted in organising the printing of Jersey stamps designed by Jersey artist Edmund Blampied.

He became manager of Boutin's Travel Agency in Library Place, St Helier, and founded the Jersey branch of theSkål association At Boutin's he created a scheme to enable French farm workers to bank their money in France. This undercut the local banks and it was a common site to see a queue of workers outside the office on a Saturday. He worked with Lucien Dior and Fra:Emile Riotteau attempting to improve rail and passenger boat links between Jersey and Paris.

Madelaine M. L. Jouault, daughter of Louis (1880–1938), married Charles Riotteau. She died from injuries when a hire car with defective brakes overturned on L'Etacq Hill, Jersey. She had two daughters: Noella (1902–1982), who became a jeweller with a shop at Place Vendôme, and Nicole (1908–1990). Both were childhood friends and later worked with Christian Dior.

== 1913–1976 ==
Edward Louis Jouault, Captain of British Intelligence, stationed him at Rouen Field Security Police. He later became (Intelligence Corps) French B.C.R (Bureau Centrale de Reseignments Militares). In the summer of 1940 in Rouen, he was searching for a fellow agent on his motorcycle, last seen at Forges Les Eaux, when he was fired upon by a tank. He managed to fire back, but was eventually captured by Rommel's 7th Panzer Division. He was given lemonade by a general who later turned out to be Rommel. He eventually escaped by pretending to be a farm labourer. He was awarded a Military Cross by George VI at Buckingham Palace.

== 1920–1942 ==
Squadron Leader Richard John Jouault saw considerable action at Dunkerque and took part in the Battle of Britain. He was the first Jersey man to be mentioned in dispatches and received the D.F.C.

F/Lt (Pilot/Instr.) Richard J. Jouault – DFC – 409030 (from Jersey, Channel Islands) was killed flying Oxford II AP465 of 12 SFTS; collided with Oxford AB641, crashed 200 yards (180 m) south of the aerodrome Grantham.
