= Juhl =

Juhl (/dʒuːl/; Danish: [ˈjuˀl]) is a surname originating in Denmark. It is most common in Denmark and the United States.

== Pronunciation ==
After coming to America, most Danes bearing the Juhl name changed the pronunciation to avoid confusion. ('J' represents a different sound in Continental Germanic languages than it is in English). Some Danish Americans with the Juhl surname, and especially with the Juul surname, changed the spelling (Danish Juhl or Juul > English Yule) in order to keep the pronunciation. This caused a lower relative number of Juuls in the United States but a high number of Yules.

== Origin ==
There are two possible origins for Juhl lines of Danish origin.

=== Christmas ===
- The Danish word for Christmas (Jul). From this term the English word Yule is also derived. It is believed that persons in some way associated with the Midwinter season, or Christmas Day specifically, took or were given this name.

=== Wheel ===
- The Danish word for wheel, hjul. Those whose occupations dealt with the wheel, e.g. wheel-makers, would have taken this name.

=== Nobility ===
There is a noble family attested to in Danish history from the 1200s AD, whose name is usually spelled "Juel" (occasionally "Iuel", a holdover of the times before the widespread adoption of the letter 'J'). However, different people adopted the name "Juhl" (or its variants) at different times and for different reasons, and it is unclear if any of the Danish Juhl lines (or Iuel, etc.) of today have continuity this far back.

== Distribution by country ==
Approximately 15,000 people in the world bear the name "Juhl" or one of its variants. Almost all of them live in Scandinavia, Northern Germany, or the United States.

Distribution of JUHL Surname, by Country
	Juhl	Juul	Juel	Juell	Juhls	Jul	Iuel	Yule	Total, all spellings	Sources
Denmark	3,528	3,369	548	0	16	163	71	0	7,689	Danish Statistical Agency
United States	2,123	426	467	226	?	?	?	1,130	4,372	
Germany	856	40	0	0	168	2	0	13	1,079	Extrapolation from phone listings and Geogen Surname Mapping
Norway	14	457	147	224	6	4	11	0	863	Norwegian Statistical Agency
Sweden	140	98	45	3	0	0	45	0	331	Statistics Sweden
Total	6,655	4,390	1,207	453	190	169	127	1,143	14,334	

=== Denmark ===
The bulk of the Danish Juhls live in Southern Jutland. "Juhl" is the 93rd most common surname in the country—and the 30th most-common non-patronym-based surname. "Juul" is the 107th most-common name overall and 40th when excluding patronyms. "Juel" is the 793rd most-common surname.

=== United States ===
Heavy Danish immigration to the United States, from the 1850s through the 1920s, is responsible for so many Juhls living in the United States today. Juhls going to the United States primarily settled in the U.S. state of Iowa. As a result, "Juhl" is one of 10,000 most-common names in the United States.

=== Germany ===
The name is somewhat common in Northern Germany (German state of Schleswig-Holstein) because of the Prussian-Danish War of 1864. Prussia seized the southern third of Danish Jutland (where most Juhls lived), and so it became incorporated into the German Empire in 1871. Most of Southern Jutland was returned to Denmark by plebiscite in 1920. There were a number of lines of Juhl families along the old Pommern Coast of then Prussia which is now on both sides of the German-Polish border.

=== Norway ===
Although Norway was once ruled by Denmark (Danish naval hero Niels Juhl was born in Oslo to Danish parents), it is likely that most Norwegian "Juuls" are independent lineages, as "Jul" is a pan-Scandinavian word for Midwinter.

Juul is the 1,182nd most common name in Norway.

== Notable Juhls ==
=== Danes ===
- Niels Juel (sometimes spelled Juhl) (1629–1697), Danish naval hero.
- Esger Juul (died 1325), Archbishop of Lund.
- Johannes Juul (1887–1969), Danish wind turbine pioneer
- Einar Juhl (1896–1982), actor.
- Christian Juhl (gymnast) (1898–1962), Olympic gymnast who helped win the gold medal in 1920.
- Anne-Marie Juhl (born 1927), actor.
- Jesper Juul (born 1948), international authority on family-therapy.
- Suzanne Juul, milliner.
- Kamilla Rytter Juhl (born 1983), badminton player.
- Kim Juhl Christensen (born 1984), Danish Olympic athlete.

=== Americans ===
- Jerry Juhl (1938–2005) television and movie writer and Muppets cofounder.
- Finn Juhl (1912–1989), furniture designer (born in Denmark, worked in the USA)
- Albert Juhl, the Iowa farmer on whose land the plane carrying Buddy Holly crashed. See The Day the Music Died.
- Mason Juhl (born 1993) American football player

=== Norwegians ===
- Lorenz Juhl Vogt (1895–1901), Norwegian politician.
- Ole Juul (1852–1927), Norwegian painter.

=== Germans ===
- Martin Juhls, German techno music producer.

== See also ==
- Jul (Denmark)
- Danish Americans
