= List of City College of New York people =

The following is a list of notable alumni and faculty of the City College of New York.

== Nobel laureates ==
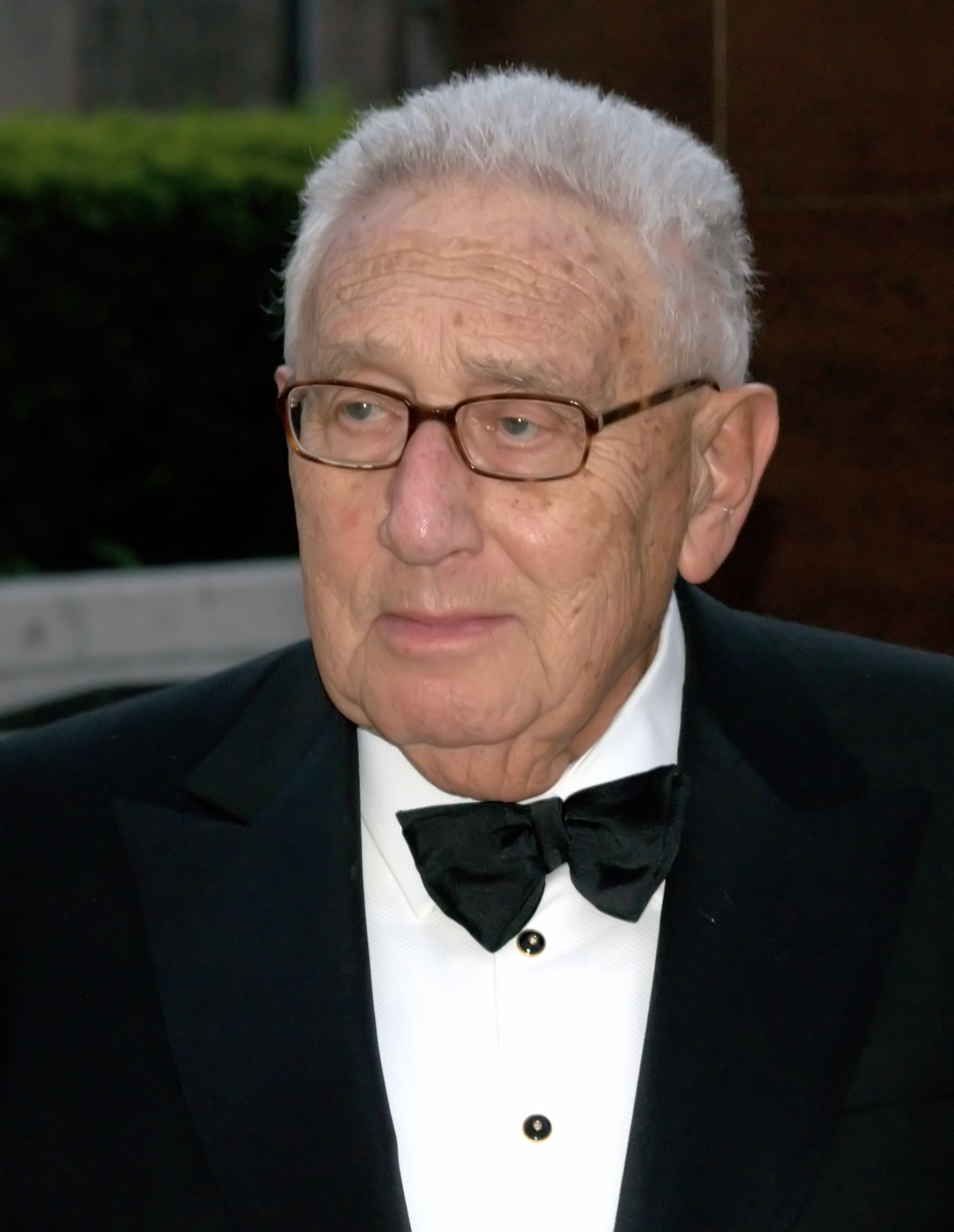
Henry Kissinger

- Kenneth Arrow 1940 – Nobel laureate in Economics, 1972
- Robert J. Aumann 1950 – Nobel laureate in Economics, 2005
- Julius Axelrod 1933 – Nobel laureate in Medicine, 1970
- Herbert Hauptman 1937 – Nobel laureate in Chemistry, 1985
- Robert Hofstadter 1935 – Nobel laureate in Physics, 1961
- Jerome Karle 1937 – Nobel laureate in Chemistry, 1985
- Henry Kissinger 1923 (did not graduate) – winner of Nobel Peace Prize, 1973
- Arthur Kornberg 1937 – Nobel laureate in Medicine, 1959
- Leon M. Lederman 1943 – Nobel laureate in Physics, 1988
- John O'Keefe 1963 – Nobel laureate in Medicine, 2014
- Arno Penzias 1954 – Nobel laureate in Physics, 1978
- Julian Schwinger (transferred to Columbia University) – Nobel laureate in Physics, 1965

== Graduates of Business School (which became Baruch College in 1968) ==
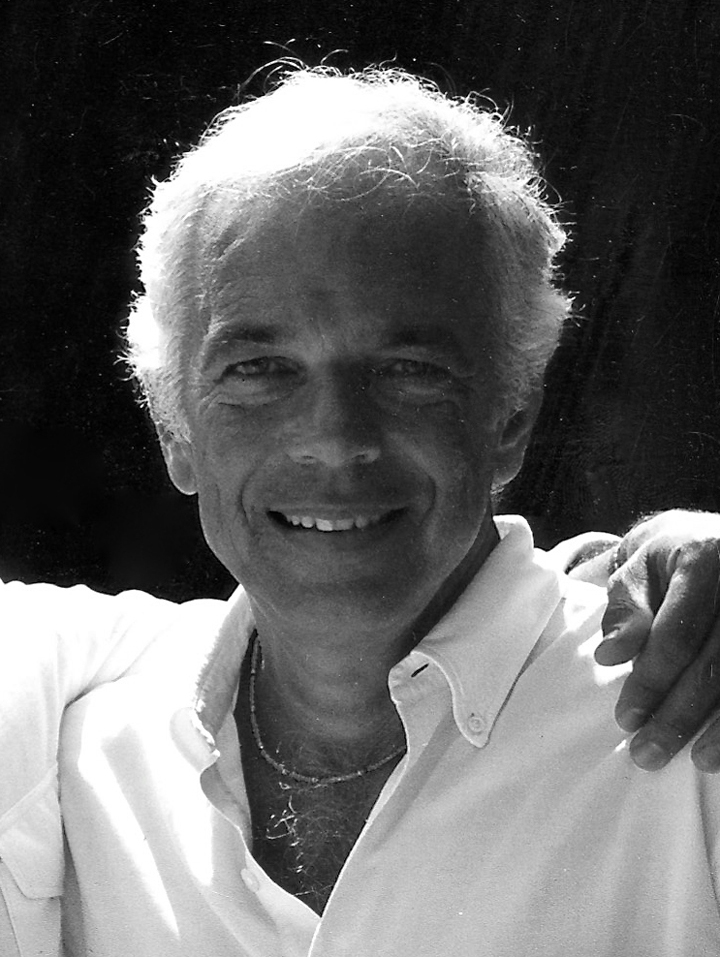
Ralph Lauren

- William F. Aldinger III 1969 – chairman and CEO, HSBC North America Holdings
- Abraham Beame 1928 – mayor of New York City
- Akis Cleanthous – former minister of Education and Culture, Cyprus
- Monte Conner 1986 – senior vice president of Roadrunner Records, A&R Department
- Michael Grimm – member of United States House of Representatives for New York's 13th congressional district
- Sidney Harman 1939 – founder and executive chairman of Harman Kardon; owner of Newsweek
- Ralph Lauren (dropped out) – fashion designer, Polo
- Carlos D. Ramirez – publisher of El Diario La Prensa
- Carl Spielvogel BBA 1957 – former U.S. ambassador to Slovakia
- Craig A. Stanley – member of New Jersey General Assembly, 1996–2008
- George Weissman BBA 1939 – former CEO, Philip Morris International
- Larry Zicklin 1957 – former chairman, Neuberger Berman

== Politics, history, government, sociology, philosophy, and religion ==
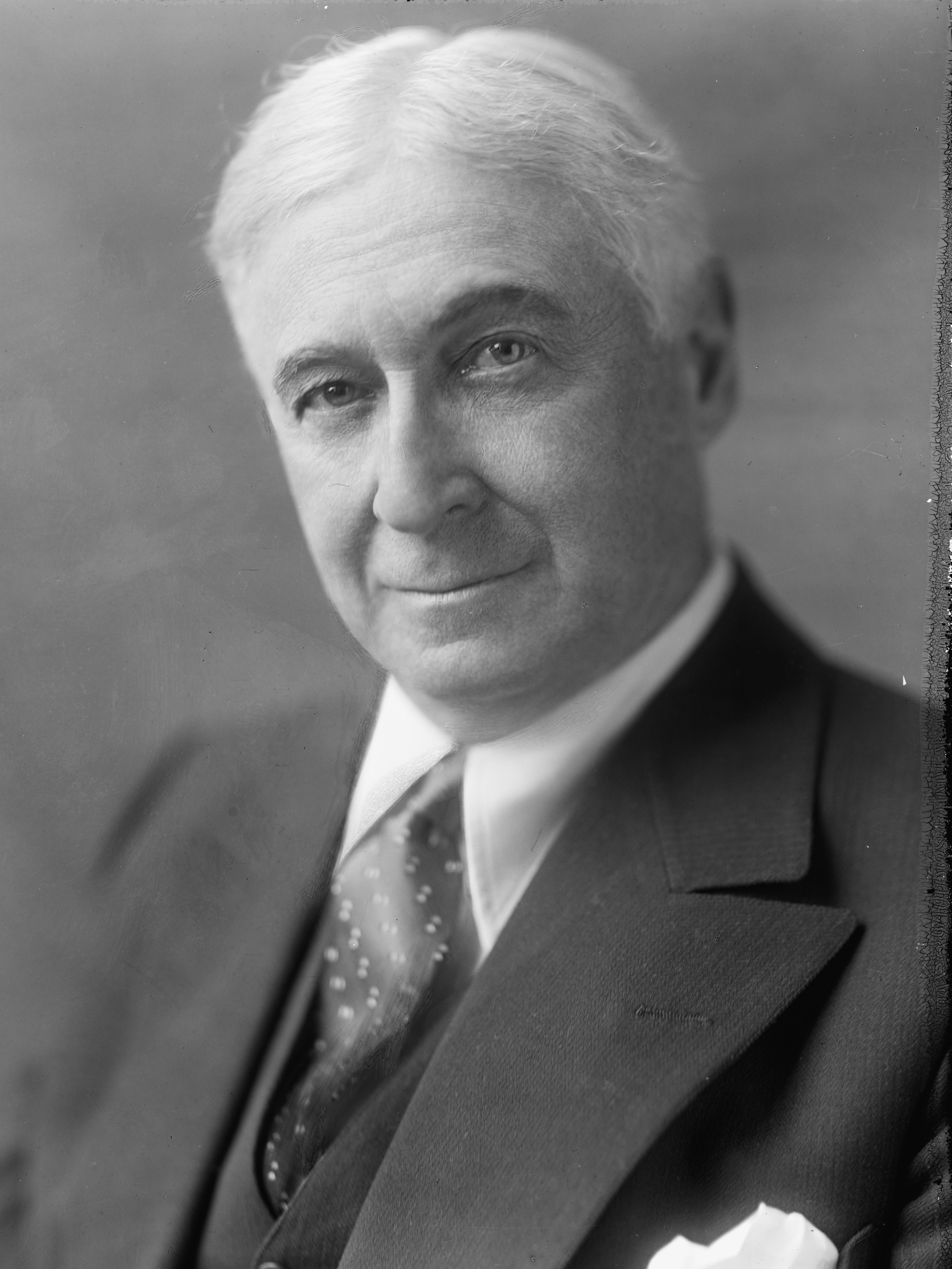
Bernard M. Baruch

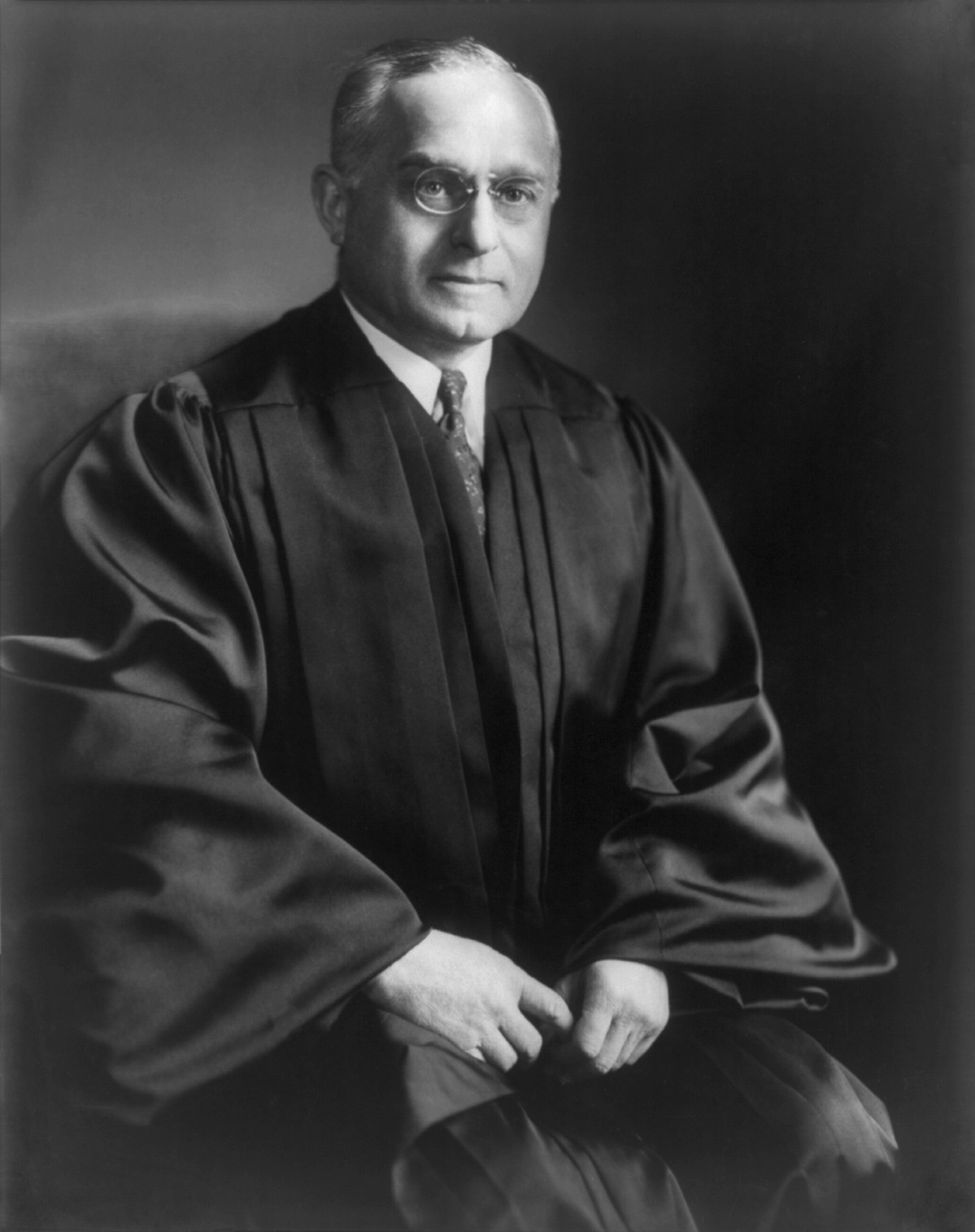
Felix Frankfurter

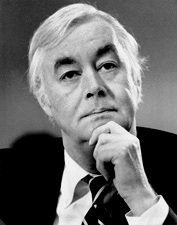
Daniel Patrick Moynihan

- Herman Badillo 1951 – congressman and chairman of CUNY's board of trustees
- Bernard M. Baruch 1889 – Wall Street financier and adviser to American presidents; author of the Baruch Plan
- Abraham D. Beame 1928 – mayor of New York City, 1974–1977
- Max Beauvoir 1958 – Haitian Vodou priest and supreme chief
- Daniel Bell 1939 – sociologist, professor at Harvard University
- Stephen Bronner – political theorist, Marxist, professor at Rutgers University
- Roswell B. Burchard 1880 – lieutenant governor of Rhode Island 1913–1915
- Jacob A. Cantor 1875 – congressman, state senator, Manhattan borough president
- Frank Caplan – educator, founder of children's educational toy company Creative Playthings
- Upendra J. Chivukula – first Asian-American elected to the New Jersey General Assembly
- Henry Cohen 1943 – director, Föhrenwald DP Camp; founding dean of the Milano School for Management and Urban Policy at The New School
- Morris Raphael Cohen – graduate of CCNY and professor at CCNY; philosopher, lawyer, and legal scholar; namesake of the Cohen Library at CCNY
- Marty Dolin – former Manitoba NDP MLA for Kildonan
- Philip Elman – Justice Department attorney and Federal Trade Commission member, wrote government's brief in Brown v. Board of Education
- Benjamin B. Ferencz – international jurist and criminal justice pioneer; co-winner of the 2009 Erasmus Prize
- Louis Finkelstein – Conservative Jewish theologian
- Abraham Foxman – national director of the Anti-Defamation League
- Felix Frankfurter 1902 – justice of the U.S. Supreme Court
- George Friedman – founder of Stratfor, author, professor of political science, security and defense analyst
- Nathan Glazer – sociologist, professor at Harvard University; author of Beyond the Melting Pot with Daniel Patrick Moynihan
- Steven Goldberg – president of the sociology department of CCNY
- Paul Goodman – writer, social critic, public intellectual; author of The Empire City, Growing Up Absurd, and Communitas
- Edmund Gordon – founding director of the Institute for Research on African Diaspora in the Americas and Caribbean (IRADAC) at CCNY
- Stanley Graze – economist and former lecturer at CCNY; worked in the United Nations, State Department, US Army and the Brookings Institution; MA from Columbia University
- Anthony J. Griffin – congressman and state senator
- Leon Harrison – rabbi
- Carl G. Hempel – philosopher of science and professor of philosophy at CCNY
- Sidney Hook 1923 – writer and philosopher
- Benjamin Kaplan 1929 – helped write the indictments of Nazi war criminals who were tried at Nuremberg; served as Nuremberg prosecutor; distinguished Harvard law professor
- Charles E. H. Kauvar 1900 – rabbi in Denver, Colorado
- Henry Kissinger – secretary of state under Richard Nixon and Gerald Ford
- Israel Knox – philosophy professor
- Ed Koch 1945 – mayor of New York City, 1978–1989
- Irving Kristol 1940 – neoconservative intellectual, professor at New York University
- Diana Lachatanere 1969 – archivist
- David Landes 1942 – historian, professor at Harvard University
- Melvin J. Lasky 1938 – anti-communist, editor of Encounter 1958–1991
- Milton Leitenberg – arms control expert
- Felix A. Levy 1904 – rabbi
- Albert L. Lewis – conservative rabbi, president of international Rabbinical Assembly
- Samuel A. Lewis – politician and philanthropist in the late 19th century; a trustee of the college
- Guillermo Linares 1975 – first Dominican American New York City Council member
- Seymour Martin Lipset – political sociology, trade unions
- Deborah Lipstadt 1969 – historian; combatted Holocaust denial
- Rachel Lloyd – applied urban anthropology graduate; founder of Girls Educational and Mentoring Services in New York
- Joseph Lookstein – rabbi and president of Bar-Ilan University
- Jay Lovestone 1918 – radical political leader and trade union functionary
- Richard Lowitt (B.A.) – historian, Guggenheim Fellow
- Sister Jean M. Marshall (M.A.) – received the Eleanor Roosevelt Human Rights Award from President Bill Clinton in 1999
- Sidney Morgenbesser – philosopher, John Dewey Professor of Philosophy, Columbia University, known to have witheringly applied Jewish humor to issues in metaphysics and epistemology
- Henry Morgenthau, Sr. – financier and diplomat; as ambassador to Ottoman Empire attempted to warn the world about the Armenian genocide
- Daniel Patrick Moynihan – spent a year at CCNY before he was drafted; author of Beyond the Melting Pot with Nathan Glazer; ambassador to the U.N.; senator representing New York
- Massimo Pigliucci – scientist and philosopher
- William Popper – Orientalist and professor
- Colin L. Powell 1961 – U.S. secretary of state, chairman of the Joint Chiefs of Staff, U.S. Army general, national security advisor
- Jacob S. Raisin – rabbi
- Simon H. Rifkind 1922 – judge of the United States District Court for the Southern District of New York
- Donald A. Ritchie 1967 – historian, currently historian of the United States Senate
- Alexander Rosenberg – Lakatos Award-winning philosopher at Duke University
- Julius Rosenberg – executed for espionage during the Cold War
- Bertrand Russell – invited by the philosophy department in 1940 to become a professor but his appointment was blocked by a suit and timidity on the part of the Board of Higher Education; see the Bertrand Russell Case
- Bayard Rustin (did not graduate) – African-American leader in social movements for civil rights, socialism, nonviolence, and gay rights (an (adviser to Martin Luther King, Jr. and main organizer of the March on Washington in 1963)
- Bernice Sandler (M.A. 1950) – the "godmother of Title IX"
- Oscar Schachter 1936 – law professor and United Nations aide
- Herbert Schiller 1940 – media critic and communications theorist
- Livingston Rowe Schuyler (1868–1931), historian and Episcopal priest
- George D. Schwab 1954 – political scientist, editor and academic, president of the National Committee on American Foreign Policy
- Henry Schwarzschild – founder of NCADP, LCDC, and head of ACLU's Capital Punishment project in America
- Allen G. Schwartz – U.S. federal judge
- Morrie Schwartz – sociologist, author, and subject of Tuesdays with Morrie
- Philip Selznick 1938 – sociologist, organizational theorist
- Assata Shakur – civil rights activist; involved in May 1973 shootout on the New Jersey Turnpike in which a state trooper was killed
- Moses J. Stroock 1886 – lawyer
- Myron Sulzberger – lawyer, politician, and judge
- Stanley S. Surrey 1929 – tax law scholar, assistant secretary of the Treasury for Tax Policy 1961–1969
- Samuel Turk – rabbi, religious leader, columnist
- Friedrich Ulfers 1959 – deconstructionist writer, dean of Media and Communications at European Graduate School, and NYU professor
- Robert F. Wagner, Sr. – U.S. senator from New York, 1927–1949; introduced the National Labor Relations Act
- Michele Wallace 1975 – major figure in African-American studies, feminist studies and cultural studies
- General Alexander S. Webb – second president of the college; winner of the Congressional Medal of Honor for heroism at the Battle of Gettysburg
- Melvyn Weiss (1935–2018, class of 1956) – attorney who co-founded the plaintiff class action law firm Milberg Weiss
- Stephen Samuel Wise 1891 – Reform rabbi, early Zionist and social justice activist
- Bertram D. Wolfe 1916 – political activist and historian

== Psychology ==
- Solomon Asch 1928 – psychologist, known for the Asch conformity experiments
- Morton Bard – psychologist, trailblazer in crisis intervention and author of The Crime Victim's Book
- Isidor Chein 1932 – minority group identification, co-wrote amicus curiae brief in Brown v. Board of Education
- Kenneth Clark – CCNY professor who studied attitudes toward race and testified at Brown v. Board of Education
- Jacob Cohen – psychologist and statistician, developed the coefficient kappa to assess the reliability of ratings of discrete categories of behavior (e.g., diagnoses of mental disorder); expert on factor analysis and regression analysis
- Morton Deutsch – social psychology, conflict resolution
- Milton Diamond 1955 – known for following up the case of David Reimer
- Leonard Eron – expert on the development of aggression
- Leon Festinger 1939 – social psychologist; pioneered experimental social psychology, the theory of cognitive dissonance
- Robert Glaser – educational psychology
- Henry Gleitman – cognitive psychology, psycholinguistics
- Arno Gruen – psychologist and psychoanalyst
- Samuel Guze – psychiatrist; pioneered the emergence of psychiatry's ability to validly diagnose disorders
- Richard Herrnstein – quantitative analysis of behavior; co-author of The Bell Curve; Harvard professor
- Frederick Irving Herzberg – two-factor theory of job satisfaction
- Richard Lazarus – emotion, stress, and coping
- Abraham Maslow – psychologist, known for his hierarchy of needs
- Barry Mehler – psychologist, MA from CCNY, 1972
- Walter Mischel – social and personality psychology
- Gardner Murphy – professor of psychology at City College
- Charles Nemeroff – chair of psychiatry at the University of Miami Miller School of Medicine
- Vera S. Paster – clinical psychologist known for her contributions to ethnic minority issues and mental health
- Irvin Rock 1947; MA 1948 – professor of psychology at Berkeley, leading researcher on perception
- Margaret Rosario – clinical psychologist known for her research on human sexuality
- Irvin S. Schonfeld – psychology faculty member and leading researcher in the field of occupational health psychology
- Jerome L. Singer – director of the Clinical Psychology program at City College
- Hans Strupp (did not graduate) – expert in psychotherapy research

== The arts ==
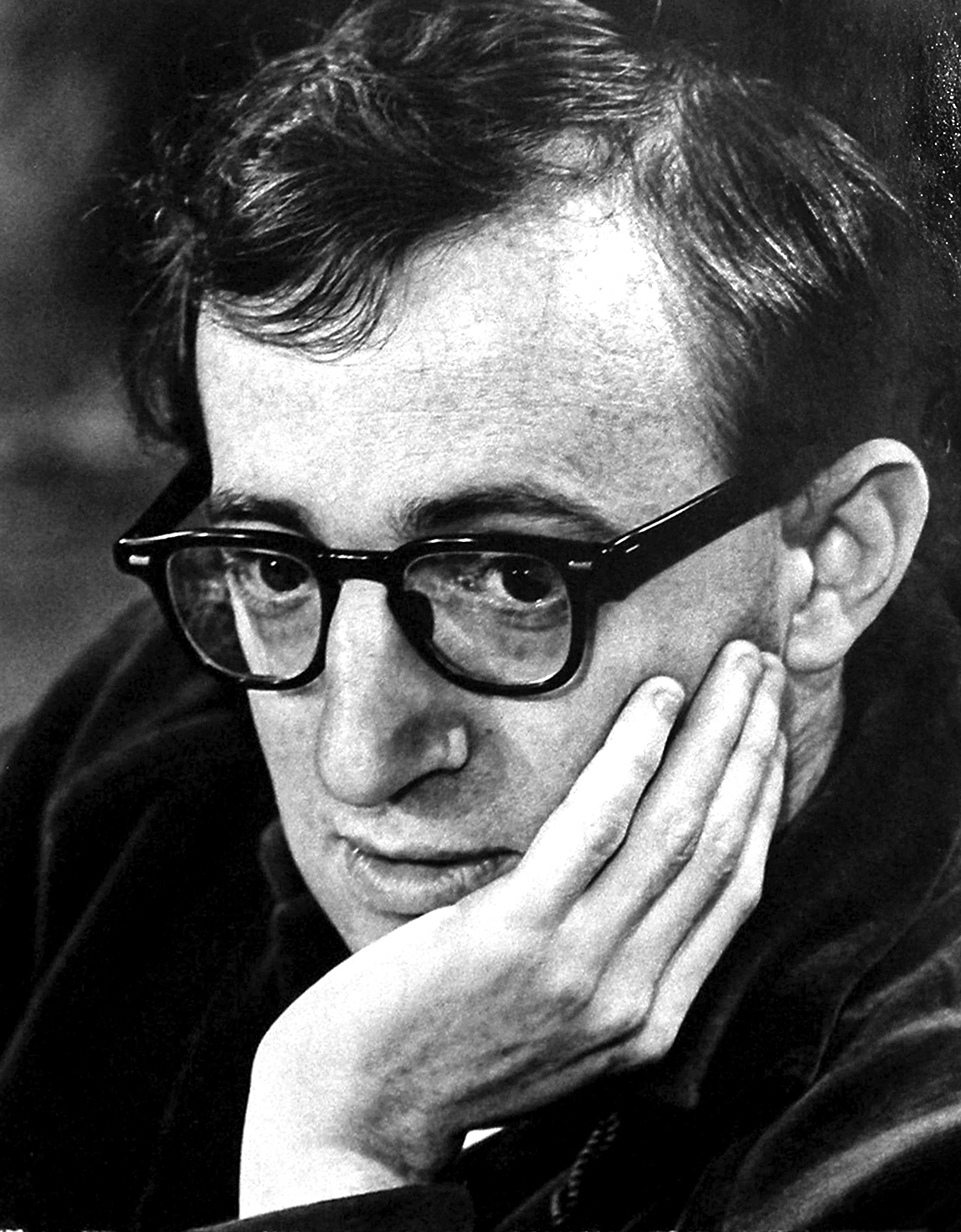
Woody Allen

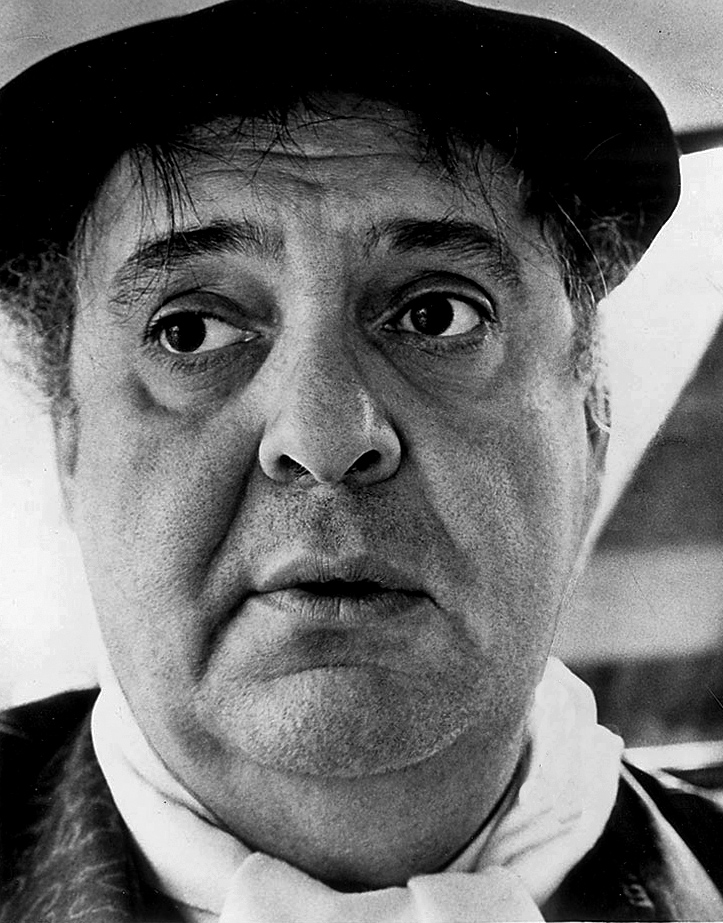
Zero Mostel

- Chantal Akerman – film director who was a visiting professor
- Woody Allen (briefly attended)
- Maurice Ashley 1993 – first African-American International Chess Grandmaster
- Jeff Barry – singer/songwriter; wrote with his wife Ellie Greenwich many hit songs, including "Be My Baby" and "Baby, I Love You"
- Deborah Berke – architect
- Seymour Boardman – New York abstract expressionist
- Chakaia Booker – sculptor
- Joshua Brand – Emmy Award-winning writer, director, and producer
- Eddie Carmel, born Oded Ha-Carmeili (1936–1972) – Israeli-born entertainer with gigantism and acromegaly, popularly known as "The Jewish Giant"
- Paddy Chayefsky 1943 – playwright and screenwriter; wrote Marty, The Hospital, Network, and Altered States
- Shirley Clarke – independent filmmaker
- Madeleine Cosman – author of medieval cookbook
- Julie Dash – filmmaker best known for Daughters of the Dust
- Edward Eliscu – songwriter; screenwriter; actor; wrote lyrics for "Carioca" (nominated for Best Song Oscar in 1935), inducted into the Songwriters Hall of Fame
- Victor Ganz – collector of contemporary art in the 20th century
- Davidson Garrett – poet; actor; New York City yellow taxi cab driver; known for his book King Lear of the Taxi: Musings of a New York City Actor/Taxi Driver
- Sergio George 1961 – producer, musician
- Ira Gershwin 1918 – lyricist; collaborator with his brother George Gershwin, and with Jerome Kern, Kurt Weill, and Harold Arlen
- William Gibson 1938 – playwright, The Miracle Worker
- Marv Goldberg 1964 – music historian in the field of rhythm & blues
- Hazelle Goodman 1986 – stage, screen and TV actress
- Eydie Gormé – singer
- Bill Graham – music promoter
- Grace Graupe-Pillard – painter
- Allen J. Grubman – entertainment lawyer
- Arthur Guiterman – humorous poet
- Luis Guzmán – actor
- E.Y. "Yip" Harburg 1918 – lyricist, "Brother Can You Spare a Dime?," The Wizard of Oz, Finian's Rainbow
- Caroline Hirsch – founder of the comedy club Caroline's
- Judd Hirsch 1960 – actor
- Sam Jaffe 1912 – actor, teacher, musician, and engineer
- Sondra James – actress
- Dayal Kaur Khalsa 1963 (as Marcia Schonfeld) – author of children's books
- Arthur Knight 1940 – movie critic, historian, teacher and TV host
- Stanley Kubrick 1946 – film director
- Mordecai Lawner – actor
- Ernest Lehman BS 1937 – screenwriter
- David Maurice Levett – composer and music teacher
- Leonard Liebling 1897 – composer, music critic, and long time editor-in-chief of the Musical Courier
- Hal Linden – actor, musician
- Frank Loesser (did not graduate) – songwriter; Tin Pan Alley, stage and films; wrote music and lyrics of "Praise the Lord and Pass the Ammunition" and the music of Guys and Dolls
- Darko Lungulov 1996 – film director
- Donald Madden – stage, television, and screen actor
- Roma Maffia – actress
- David Margulies – actor
- Ernest Martin – theatre director and manager
- Jackie Mason – comedian and actor
- Jerry Masucci – founder of Fania Records
- Butterfly McQueen 1975 – actress
- Radley Metzger – filmmaker and film distributor
- Andy Mineo – rapper, singer, producer, director, actor and minister
- Nyala Moon – filmmaker, screenwriter, and actress
- Sterling Morrison 1970 – musician, co-founder of The Velvet Underground
- Zero Mostel 1935 – actor
- Thom Michael Mulligan – actor and film festival director
- Stanley Nelson 1976 – documentary filmmaker
- John Patitucci – jazz bassist, City College
- Brock Peters – actor, known for his role in as Tom Robinson in the film version of To Kill a Mockingbird
- Abraham Polonsky 1932 – screenwriter, director of Force of Evil
- George Ranalli 1946 – architect and dean, Spitzer School of Architecture of The City College of New York
- Adrienne Rich – feminist poet and essayist; taught at CCNY 1968–1979
- Faith Ringgold – artist known for her painted story quilts
- Edward G. Robinson 1914 – actor
- Walter Rosenblum – photographer; documented US forces in Europe during World War II
- Judith Rossner – novelist; author of Looking for Mr. Goodbar and August; attended 1952–1955
- Mickey Rourke – actor; never officially attended, but began auditing Sandra Seacat's acting class in 1975, making what is generally referred to as his stage debut at CCNY in May of that year
- Chris Rush 1968 – stand-up comedian
- Robert Russin – sculptor
- Richard Schiff 1983 – Emmy Award-winning actor; star of The West Wing (played Toby Ziegler; see "Fictional" below)
- Sandra Seacat 1970s – actor, director and acting coach, taught acting at City College
- Ben Shahn – artist
- Dan Shor – actor
- Gabourey Sidibe – actress, majored in psychology
- Russell Simmons (did not graduate) – hip hop mogul
- Hrvoje Slovenc – photographer
- Erik Sommer – contemporary artist
- Alfred Stieglitz 1884 – photographer
- Ed Summerlin – tenor saxophonist, composer and arranger; directed CCNY's jazz program 1971–1989
- Jean Toomer – novelist; associated with the Harlem Renaissance; did not graduate
- Roy Turk – songwriter; member of the Songwriters' Hall of Fame; wrote lyrics of standards including "Mean To Me," "I'll Get By," and "Walkin' My Baby Back Home"
- Vagabon – multi-instrumentalist, singer-songwriter and producer; graduated from Grove School of Engineering
- J. Buzz Von Ornsteiner – forensic psychologist; television personality
- Eli Wallach MA 1938 – actor
- Dirk Weiler – singer and actor
- Cornel Wilde 1935 – actor

== Literature and journalism ==
- Alan Abelson 1942 – columnist, former editor, Barron's
- Marc D. Angel MA – rabbinic leader, published author
- Maurice Ashley 1988 – chess grandmaster, chess promoter, and author
- Toni Cade Bambara
- Helen Boyd 1995 – writer, speaker, and educator on gender and transgender theory
- Lawrence Bush – author and editor of Jewish Currents
- Barbara Christian
- Dan Daniel 1910 – dean of American sportswriters
- Reuben Fine 1932 – chess grandmaster, psychologist, and author
- Reuben Fink 1910 – Yiddish-language author
- Nat Fleischer 1908 – sports writer, especially boxing; founder of Ring magazine
- Floriana Garo 1987 – Albanian television presenter and model
- Davidson Garrett 1988 – poet
- Rebecca Newberger Goldstein – novelist, philosopher, MacArthur Fellow
- Vivian Gornick – writer, memoirist, feminist, professor; author of Fierce Attachments (1987)
- Clyde Haberman 1966 – New York Times reporter and columnist
- Safiya Henderson-Holmes MFA – poet, winner of the 1990 William Carlos Williams Award
- Oscar Hijuelos 1975 – won the 1990 Pulitzer Prize for novel The Mambo Kings Play Songs of Love
- Hy Hollinger – entertainment trade journalist, reporter and editor for Variety, international editor of The Hollywood Reporter (1992–2008)
- Irving Howe 1940 – author of World of Our Fathers, literary critic, coined the phrase "New York Jewish Intellectual"
- John Johnson BA 1961, MA 1963 – journalist and television news correspondent/anchor
- June Jordan
- Bernard Kalb 1951 – journalist and television news correspondent
- Marvin Kalb 1951 – journalist and television news correspondent
- Kwame Karikari – Ghanaian journalist and academic
- David Karp 1948 – novelist and television writer
- Alfred Kazin – author of A Walker in the City, literary critic
- Dayal Kaur Khalsa (née Marcia Schonfeld) 1963 – author of children's books
- Marvin Kitman 1953 – television critic, humorist, and author
- Jack Kroll 1937 – culture editor, Newsweek
- Joseph P. Lash 1931 – Pulitzer Prize for Biography winner, author of Eleanor and Franklin
- Harvey Leonard (Moskowitz) 1970 – meteorologist, broadcast journalist, and TV personality
- Paul Levinson – author of The Plot to Save Socrates and The Silk Code (winner, Locus Award, 1999)
- Oscar Lewis 1936 – anthropologist, author, and professor
- Douglas Light 2003 – novelist, screenwriter, short story writer (O. Henry Prize winner 2003, Grace Paley Prize 2010)
- Audre Lorde
- Bernard Malamud BA 1936 – author (won the 1967 Pulitzer Prize and a National Book Award); author of The Assistant
- Henry Miller – ttended one semester, author of Tropic of Cancer
- Ralph Morse – career photographer for LIFE magazine; youngest war correspondent in World War II; recipient of the 1995 Joseph A. Sprague Memorial Award, the highest honor in photojournalism
- Montrose Jonas Moses 1899 – author
- Walter Mosley 1991 (MA) – best-selling author whose novels about private eye Easy Rawlins have received Edgar and Golden Dagger awards
- Larry Neal
- Michael Oreskes 1975 – former senior vice president for news at NPR
- Arthur Pine – author, literary agent
- Mario Puzo – best-selling novelist; screenwriter, The Godfather
- Ernesto Quiñonez BA, MA 1996 – national bestselling author of Bodega Dreams
- Robert Rosen BA 1974, MA 1977 – author of the best-selling biography Nowhere Man: The Final Days of John Lennon
- A.M. Rosenthal 1949 – former executive editor of The New York Times
- Henry Roth 1928 – novelist, author of Call It Sleep
- Miriam Roth – Israeli writer and scholar of children's books; kindergarten teacher; educator
- Robert Scheer – journalist
- Daniel Schorr 1939 – journalist, newscaster, and commentator for CBS, CNN, and NPR
- Stephen Shepard 1961 – editor-in-chief, Business Week
- Anatole Shub – editor and journalist specializing in Eastern European matters
- Upton Sinclair BA 1897 – author of The Jungle
- Robert Sobel BSS 1951, MA 1952 – best-selling author of business histories
- Keith Sweat 1984 – R&B singer, and radio show host personality
- Julius Thompson BA Arts – teacher and novelist (Andy Michael Pilgrim trilogy)
- Earl Ubell 1948 – print, TV and radio journalist specializing in science and health reporting
- Elsie B. Washington – author (using the pseudonym Rosalind Welles) of the 1980 book Entwined Destinies, considered the first romance novel featuring African-American characters written by an African-American author
- Al Wasserman 1941 – documentary film-maker
- Gary Weiss 1975 – investigative journalist, author
- Edward Wellen 1955 – mystery and science fiction writer
- Rajzel Żychlińsky – Yiddish-language poet

== Science, technology, and mathematics ==
- Edward I. Altman 1963 – Max L. Heine Professor of Finance at the NYU Stern School of Business and the academic leader in the study of High-Yield Bond and Distressed Debt Markets and Credit Risk Management
- Daniel Berg 1950 – physical chemist; provost and professor of Science and Technology at Rensselaer Polytechnic Institute
- Joseph Berkson 1920 – physician and biostatistician known for Berkson's fallacy/Berkson's paradox
- Jerome A. Berson 1944 – chemistry professor at Yale; worked on non-Kekulé molecules
- Solomon A. Berson 1938 – medical scientist at Mt. Sinai Hospital who would probably have won a Nobel with his colleague Rosalyn Yalow, had he not died prematurely
- Julius Blank – engineer, member of the "Traitorous Eight" who founded Silicon Valley
- Burrill Bernard Crohn 1902 – gastroenterologist; known for disease named after him
- Charles DeLisi BA 1963 – scientist, "father of the Human Genome Project"
- Persi Diaconis 1971 – mathematician; Mary V. Sunseri professor of Statistics and Mathematics at Stanford University
- Milton Diamond 1955 – sexologist and professor of anatomy and reproductive biology
- Jesse Douglas 1916 – mathematician; one of two winners of the first Fields Medal awarded in 1936
- Joel S. Engel 1957 – scientist and electrical engineer instrumental in mobile phone technology
- Adin Falkoff – engineer, computer scientist, co-inventor of the APL language interactive system
- Mitchell Feigenbaum 1964 – mathematical physicist
- Richard Felder 1962 – engineering professor, co-author of Elementary Principles of Chemical Processes
- Jeffrey Scott Flier 1969 – dean of Harvard Medical School
- Michael Freeman BS 1969 – inventor
- Alfred Gessow 1943 – pioneering helicopter aerodynamicist at NACA/NASA, and professor at University of Maryland
- Wolcott Gibbs – distinguished chemistry professor at the Free Academy
- Seymour Ginsburg 1948 – distinguished computer science professor
- Richard D. Gitlin 1964 – engineer, co-invention of DSL Bell Labs
- George Washington Goethals 1887 – civil engineer, supervised the construction and opening of the Panama Canal
- Joseph Goldberger – started in engineering; transferred to Bellevue Hospital Medical School; discovered that B vitamin deficiency was cause of pellagra; paved way for Elvehjem to narrow cause to vitamin B_{3}
- Dan Goldin – 9th and longest-tenured administrator of NASA
- Andrew S. Grove ChE. 1960 – founder and former chairman of Intel Corp; donated $26 million, the largest gift ever received by the college
- Gary Gruber 1962 – physicist, testing expert, educator, author
- Alan Hantman – 10th architect of the Capitol
- Herman Hollerith – early computer pioneer, invented key punch
- Girardin Jean-Louis 1997 – professor in the Department of Population Health and Psychiatry at New York University
- Fred M. Johnson – professor of physics at California State University, Fullerton
- Robert E. Kahn – Internet pioneer, co-inventor of the TCP/IP protocol, co-recipient of the Turing Award in 2004
- Michio Kaku – CCNY professor; theoretical physicist and co-founder of string field theory
- Edward Kasner – mathematician; coiner of the term "googol"
- Gary A. Klein 1964 – research psychologist, known for pioneering the field of naturalistic decision making
- Leonard Kleinrock 1957 – Internet pioneer
- Edward Kravitz 1954 – neurobiologist
- Solomon Kullback – mathematician; NSA cryptology pioneer
- Emanuel Libman – physician
- Valentino Mazzia – forensic anesthesiologist
- Albert Medwin BSEE 1949 – engineer and inventor, developed CMOS integrated circuit technology
- David Michaels 1976 – epidemiologist and Occupational Safety and Health Administration administrator
- Irving Millman 1948 – microbiologist and virologist
- Lewis Mumford – historian of technology; author of The City in History
- Karl J. Niklas – professor of plant biology at Cornell University
- John O'Keefe – neuroscientist, winner of the Nobel Prize in Physiology and Medicine
- Paul Pimsleur – professor, applied linguist, inventor of the Pimsleur language learning system
- Charles Lane Poor – astronomer
- Martin Pope 1939 – physical chemist; 2006 Davy Medal winner; known for pioneering work in electronic process in organic crystals and polymers, particularly discoveries in area of ohmic contacts
- Emil Leon Post – distinguished mathematician and professor of mathematics at CCNY
- George Edward Post – BA in 1854, MA in 1857, and later MD in 1860, professor of surgery at the Syrian Protestant College in Beirut, now the American University of Beirut (AUB)
- Frank Press 1944 BS. Designed a long-period seismograph; involved in development of a lunar seismograph for Apollo 11. Science Advisor to Pres. Jimmy Carter; President of the National Academy of Sciences
- Jacob Rabinow – engineer; inventor; held 230 U.S. patents on a variety of mechanical, optical and electrical devices
- Maurice M. Rapport 1940 – biochemist; identified the neurotransmitter serotonin
- Saul Rosen 1941 BS Mathematics – early computer pioneer, mathematician, engineer, and professor
- Jack Ruina 1944 BSEE – former director of ARPA
- Mario Runco Jr. 1974 – astronaut
- Jonas Salk 1934 – inventor of the Salk vaccine (see polio vaccine)
- Harold Scheraga 1941 – pioneering scientist in physical biochemistry
- Philip H. Sechzer 1934 – anesthesiologist; pioneer in pain management; inventor of patient-controlled analgesia (PCA)
- Abraham Sinkov – mathematician; National Security Agency cryptology pioneer
- David L. Spector – biology; professor and director of research, Cold Spring Harbor Laboratory
- David B. Steinman 1906 – engineer; bridge designer; designed the Mackinac Bridge; founded the National Society of Professional Engineers; namesake of the CCNY engineering building
- Leonard Susskind 1962 – physicist, string theory
- Sam Switzer 1952 – medical researcher
- Joseph F. Traub 1954 – computer scientist, mathematician
- John P. Turner c. 1906 – physician, surgeon, hospital administrator, and educator
- Edgar Villchur BA, MS 1940 – inventor, educator, writer, founder of Acoustic Research
- Mark Zemansky 1921 – physicist; textbook author; professor of physics at City College of New York from 1925 until he became an emeritus professor of Physics in 1967

== Business ==
- Sheldon Adelson – businessman and Republican donor, attended City College but dropped out before graduating
- Miles Cahn – co-founder of Coach, Inc.
- Millard Drexler – chairman and CEO of J. Crew Group; former CEO of Gap Inc
- Jerald G. Fishman – chief executive officer and president of Analog Devices since November 1996
- Andrew Grove 1960 – 4th employee of Intel, and eventually its president, CEO, and chairman; Time magazine's Man of the Year in 1997; donated $26,000,000 to CCNY's Grove School of Engineering in 2005
- Joseph Gurwin – philanthropist who dropped out after becoming a partner in a textile firm; "realized I was making more money than my professors"
- Stanley H. Kaplan 1939 – founded Kaplan Educational Services
- Nat Lefkowitz – co-chairman of the William Morris Agency
- Jean Nidetch – founded Weight Watchers
- Lin Peng – David Krell Chair in Finance
- Jack Rudin 1941 – real estate developer
- Herbert Simon B.B.A. – real estate developer, co-founder of Simon Property Group, owner of the Indiana Pacers NBA basketball team
- Melvin Simon 1949 – real estate developer, co-founder of Simon Property Group
- Bernard Spitzer 1943 – real estate developer
- Linda Kaplan Thaler 1972 – CEO of ad agency in New York; created the Aflac Duck

== Sports ==
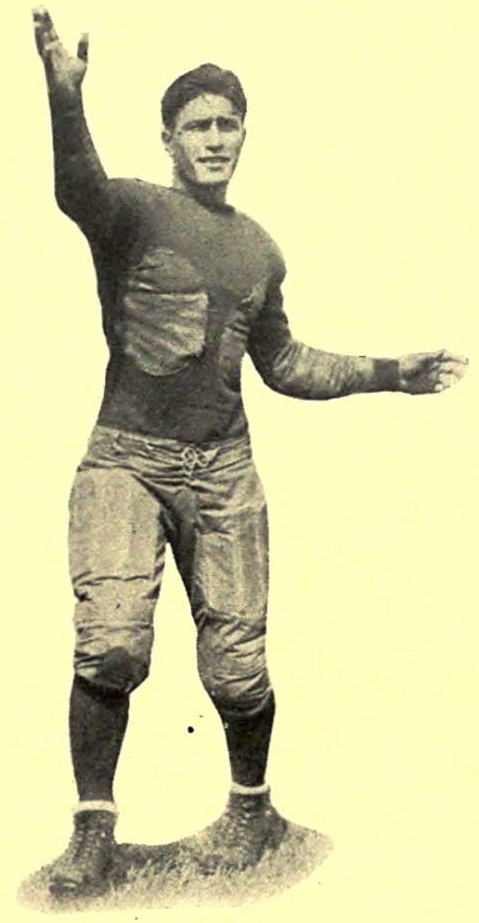
Benny Friedman

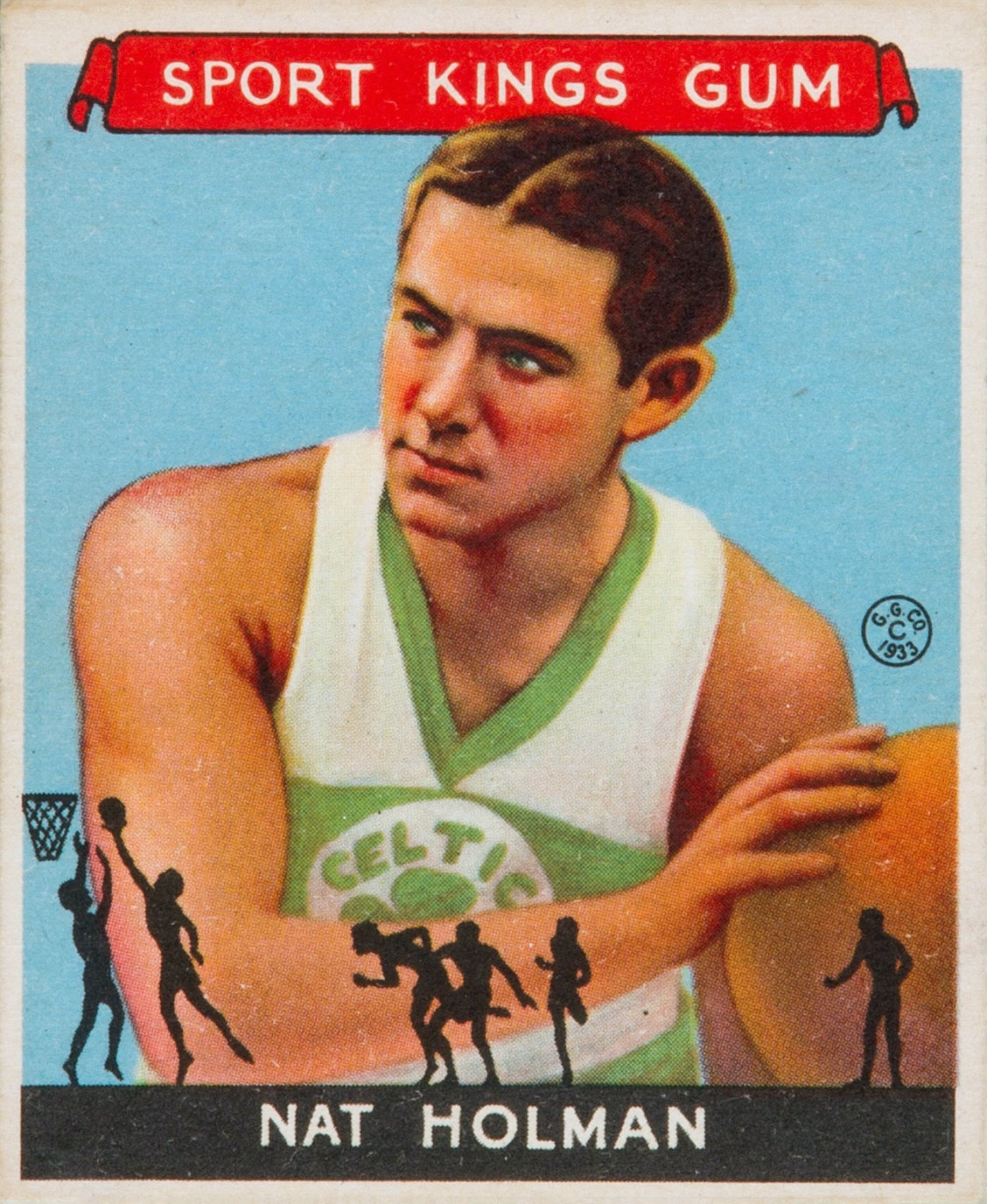
Nat Holman

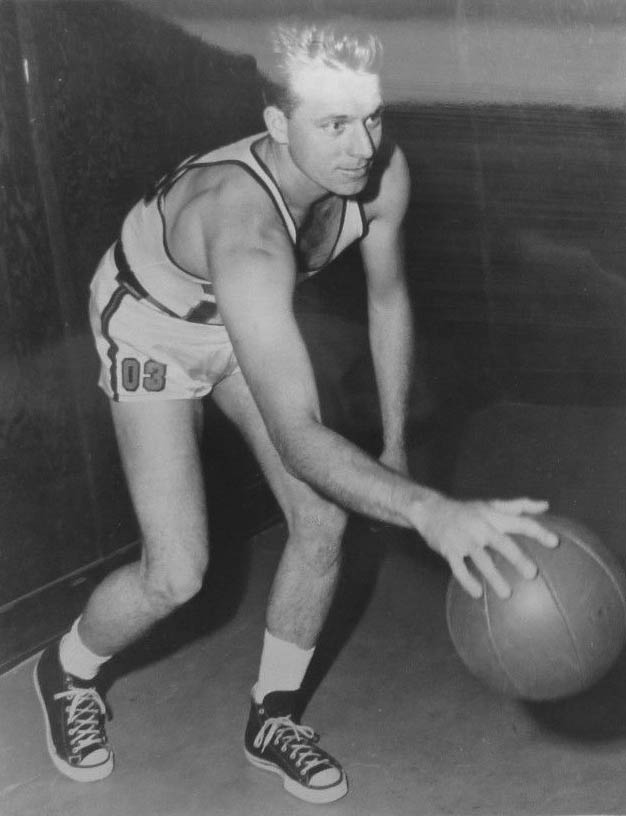
Red Holzman

- Albert Axelrod (1921–2004) – Olympic medalist foil fencer
- Daniel Bukantz (1917–2008) – Olympic fencer
- Abram Cohen (1924–2016) – Olympic fencer
- Irwin Dambrot – basketball player involved in the CCNY point-shaving scandal
- Phil Farbman (1924–1996) – basketball player
- Nat Fleischer – founder and editor of Ring magazine, authority on boxing
- Heather Foster – Jamaican-born American professional bodybuilder
- Benny Friedman (1905–1982) – University of Michigan and College and NFL Hall of Fame football quarterback, coached the CCNY football team 1935–1941
- Harold Goldsmith 1952 – foil and épée fencer, won the 1952 NCAA foil championship, competed in three Olympiads for the US, won two Pan American Games gold medals and two silver medals
- Sidney Hertzberg (1922–2005) – former NY Knicks basketball player
- Nat Holman (1896–1995) – Hall of Fame basketball player and CCNY coach
- Red Holzman 1942 – All-American guard at CCNY; two-time All-Star NBA guard; basketball coach for the New York Knicks; Hall of Famer
- Jane Katz (born 1943) – Olympic swimmer
- Floyd Layne – basketball player involved in the CCNY Point Shaving Scandal; later coached the CCNY men's basketball team
- Bennet Nathaniel "Nate" Lubell (1916–2006) – Olympic fencer
- Nat Militzok (1923–2009) – basketball player for the New York Knicks
- Tubby Raskin (1902–1981) – basketball player and coach
- Saul Rogovin (1922–1995) – Major League Baseball pitcher; 1951 AL ERA leader
- Hank Rosenstein (1920–2010) – basketball player for the New York Knicks
- Barney Sedran (1891–1964) – member of the Basketball Hall of Fame
- Moe Spahn – basketball player
- James Strauch (1921–1998) – Olympic fencer
- Fred Thompson (1933–2019) – Hall of Fame track and field coach
- Henry Wittenberg (1918–2010) – Olympic wrestler; won gold medal at 1948 Olympics and silver medal in 1952

== Other ==
- Leon M. Goldstein (died 1999) – president of Kingsborough Community College, and acting chancellor of the City University of New York
- Charles F. Hummel (born 1932) – curator and deputy director at the Winterthur Museum, Garden and Library
- Raymond Lisle (1910–1994) – attorney, officer in the US Foreign Service, and dean of Brooklyn Law School
- Selma Wassermann (born 1929) – Canadian-American author, teacher

== Fictional ==
- Lennie Briscoe – character from the TV show Law & Order
- Don Draper – character from the TV show Mad Men
- Brian Flanagan – character from the 1988 film Cocktail
- Gordon Gekko – character from the 1987 film Wall Street
- Nancy – character from the 1971 film Bananas
- Sam Posner – character from the 1988 film Crossing Delancey
- Roth – character in Norman Mailer's novel The Naked and the Dead
- Joe Turner – character in the 1975 film Three Days of the Condor
- Toby Ziegler – character from the TV show The West Wing

== See also ==
- Category:City College of New York alumni
- Category:City College of New York faculty
- List of City College of New York alumni
