= List of City College of New York alumni =

== Notable alumni ==
=== Nobel laureates ===
- Kenneth Arrow 1940 – Nobel laureate in Economics, 1972
- Robert J. Aumann 1950 – Nobel laureate in Economics, 2005
- Julius Axelrod 1933 – Nobel laureate in Medicine, 1970
- Herbert Hauptman 1937 – Nobel laureate in Chemistry, 1985
- Robert Hofstadter 1935 – Nobel laureate in Physics, 1961
- Jerome Karle 1937 – Nobel laureate in Chemistry, 1985
- Arthur Kornberg 1937 – Nobel laureate in Medicine, 1959
- Leon M. Lederman 1943 – Nobel laureate in Physics, 1988
- John O'Keefe, 1963 – Nobel laureate in Physiology or Medicine, 2014
- Arno Penzias 1954 – Nobel laureate in Physics, 1978

=== Rhodes Scholars ===
- James T. Molloy 1939

=== Chancellors ===
- Matthew Goldstein – former chancellor of the City University of New York (1999–2013)

=== Politics, government and sociology ===
- Herman Badillo 1951 – former congressman and chairman of CUNY's board of trustees, an architect of the university's academic rebirth
- Bernard M. Baruch 1889 – Wall Street financier; adviser to American presidents for 40 years, from Woodrow Wilson to John F. Kennedy
- Abraham D. Beame 1928 – mayor of New York City, 1974–1977
- Daniel Bell – sociologist, professor at Harvard University
- Stephen Bronner – political theorist, Marxist, professor at Rutgers University
- Upendra J. Chivukula – first Asian-American elected to the New Jersey General Assembly
- Henry Cohen 1943 – director of Föhrenwald DP Camp; founding dean of the Milano School for Management and Urban Policy at The New School
- Suzanne DiMaggio – long-time analyst of U.S. foreign policy in Asia and the Middle East
- Benjamin B. Ferencz 1920 – international jurist
- Abraham Foxman – national director of the Anti-Defamation League
- Felix Frankfurter 1902 – justice of the U.S. Supreme Court, 1939–1962
- George Friedman – founder of Stratfor, author, professor of political science, security and defense analyst
- Nathan Glazer – sociologist and professor at Harvard University
- Irving Howe – coined the phrase "New York Jewish intellectual"
- Robert T. Johnson 1972 – Bronx district attorney
- Henry Kissinger – Nobel Peace Prize recipient, secretary of state, National Security advisor (did not graduate)
- Ed Koch 1945 – mayor of New York City, 1978–1989
- Irving Kristol 1940 – neoconservative pundit
- Melvin J. Lasky 1938 – anti-communist; editor of Encounter 1958–1991
- Milton Leitenberg 1955 – arms control expert
- Guillermo Linares 1975 – first Dominican-American New York City Council member
- Colin Powell – United States secretary of state (2001–2005); chairman of the Joint Chiefs of Staff (1989–1993) and U.S. Army general; National Security advisor (1987–1989)
- Sal Restivo 1965 – pioneer ethnographer of science; one of the founders of the sociology of mathematics; founding member and former president of the Society for Social Studies of Science
- Julius Rosenberg – infamous convicted spy during the Cold War
- Robert F. Wagner Sr. – United States senator from New York, 1927–1949
- Michele Wallace 1975 – major figure in African-American studies, feminist studies and cultural studies
- Stephen Samuel Wise 1891 – Reform rabbi, early Zionist and social justice activist
- Marilyn Zayas 1965 – judge, Ohio's First District Court of Appeals

=== The arts ===
- Maurice Ashley 1993 – first African-American International Chess Grandmaster
- Paddy Chayefsky – playwright and screenwriter; wrote Marty, Hospital and Altered States
- Carl Dreher 1917 – sound engineer, nominated for Sound Recording Academy Awards for the films The Gay Divorcee and I Dream Too Much
- Ira Gershwin 1918 – lyricist, collaborator with, and brother of George Gershwin
- Marv Goldberg 1964 – music historian in the field of rhythm & blues
- Hazelle Goodman 1986 – stage, screen and TV actress; first African-American to hold a leading role in a Woody Allen film, Deconstructing Harry
- Arthur Guiterman – humorous poet
- Luis Guzmán – actor
- E.Y. "Yip" Harburg 1918 – lyricist (The Wizard of Oz, Finian's Rainbow)
- Judd Hirsch 1960 – actor
- Alvin Hollingsworth – painter, co-organizer of African-American artist contributors to 1963 March on Washington, and early comic book artist
- Ernest Lehman 1937 (BS) – screenwriter (North by Northwest, The Sound of Music, Sweet Smell of Success, Who's Afraid of Virginia Woolf?)
- David Margulies – actor
- Jackie Mason – comedian and actor
- Sterling Morrison 1970 – musician, co-founder of The Velvet Underground
- Zero Mostel 1935 – actor
- Faith Ringgold 1959 – artist and children's book author and illustrator
- Edward G. Robinson 1914 – actor
- Richard Schiff 1983 – Emmy Award-winning actor; star of The West Wing (his character, Toby Ziegler, also attended CCNY)
- Ben Shahn – artist
- Gabourey Sidibe – actress
- Alfred Stieglitz 1884 – photographer
- Eli Wallach 1938 MA – actor

=== Literature and journalism ===
- Alan Abelson 1942 – columnist, former editor, Barron's
- Morris Raphael Cohen – philosopher, lawyer, and legal scholar
- Dan Daniel 1910 – "dean of American sportswriters"
- Davidson Garrett 1988 – poet
- Gary Gruber 1962 – best selling author, educator, physicist
- Oscar Hijuelos 1975 – won the 1990 Pulitzer Prize for his novel The Mambo Kings Play Songs of Love
- Jack Kroll 1937 – culture editor, Newsweek
- Paul Levinson – author of The Plot to Save Socrates and The Silk Code; winner of Locus Award, 1999
- Bernard Malamud 1936 (BA) – author; won 1967 Pulitzer Prize and a National Book Award for his novel The Fixer, National Book Award for The Magic Barrel; also wrote The Natural (1952)
- Montrose Jonas Moses – author
- Walter Mosley 1991 MA – best-selling author whose novels about private eye Easy Rawlins have received Edgar and Golden Dagger Awards
- Michael Oreskes 1975 – executive editor of the International Herald Tribune
- Mario Puzo – bestselling novelist, screenwriter, The Godfather
- Selwyn Raab – investigative journalist for The New York Times
- Alexander Rosenberg 1967 – novelist and philosopher
- A.M. Rosenthal 1949 – won the 1960 Pulitzer Prize for international reporting; executive editor of The New York Times
- Henry Roth – novelist and author of Call It Sleep, a novel on the Jewish immigrant experience
- Robert Scheer – journalist and radio host
- Stephen Shepard 1961 – editor in chief, Business Week
- Anatole Shub – editor and journalist specializing in Eastern European matters
- Upton Sinclair 1897 BA – author of The Jungle (1906)
- Robert Sobel 1951 BSS, 1952 MA – best-selling author of business histories
- Gary Weiss 1975 – investigative journalist; author of Born to Steal (2003) and Wall Street Versus America (2006)

=== Science and technology ===
- Solomon Asch – psychologist, known for the Asch conformity experiments
- Julius Blank – engineer, member of the "traitorous eight" who founded Silicon Valley
- Marvin Chester 1952 – physicist, quantum physics emeritus professor at UCLA
- Adin Falkoff – engineer, computer scientist, co-inventor of the APL language interactive system
- Richard D. Gitlin 1964 – engineer, co-invention of DSL Bell Labs
- George Washington Goethals 1887 – civil engineer, best known for his supervision of construction and the opening of the Panama Canal
- Dan Goldin 1962 – 9th and longest-tenured administrator of NASA
- Walter S. Graf – cardiologist, pioneer in creation of emergency paramedic care system
- Robert E. Kahn 1960 – Internet pioneer, co-inventor of the TCP/IP protocol, co-recipient of the Turing Award in 2004
- Allen Kent – pioneer of information science, especially mechanized information retrieval
- Gary A. Klein 1964 – research psychologist, known for pioneering the field of naturalistic decision making
- Leonard Kleinrock 1957 – Internet pioneer
- Solomon Kullback – mathematician; NSA cryptology pioneer
- Lewis Mumford – historian of technology
- Charles Lane Poor – noted astronomer
- Mario Runco, Jr. 1974 – astronaut
- Jonas Salk 1934 – inventor of the Salk polio vaccine
- Philip H. Sechzer 1934 – anesthesiologist, pioneer in pain management; inventor of patient-controlled analgesia
- Abraham Sinkov – mathematician; NSA cryptology pioneer
- Herbert Solomon 1940 – professor and founder of Stanford University Department of Statistics
- David B. Steinman 1906 – engineer; bridge designer
- Leonard Susskind 1962 – physicist, string theory

=== Business ===
- Andrew Grove 1960 – 4th employee of Intel, and eventually its president, CEO, and chairman; TIME magazine's Man of the Year in 1997; donated $26,000,000 to CCNY's Grove School of Engineering in 2006
- Melvin Simon 1949 – real estate developer, co-founder of Simon Property Group

=== Sports ===
- Red Holzman 1942 – basketball coach for the New York Knicks
- Holcombe Rucker 1962 – organizer and namesake of the Rucker Tournament

== Fictional alumni ==
- Lennie Briscoe – character from the TV show Law & Order
- Don Draper – character on the TV show Mad Men
- Brian Flanagan – character from the 1988 film Cocktail
- Gordon Gekko – character from the 1987 film Wall Street
- Nancy – character from the 1971 film Bananas
- Toby Ziegler – character from the TV show The West Wing

== See also ==
- Category:City College of New York alumni
- List of City College of New York people

== References and further reading ==
- S. Willis Rudy, College of the City of New York 1847–1947, 1949.
- James Traub, City on a Hill: Testing the American Dream at City College, 1994.
- Paul David Pearson, The City College of New York: 150 years of academic architecture, 1997.
- Sandra S. Roff, et al., From the Free Academy to Cuny: Illustrating Public Higher Education in New York City, 1847–1997, 2000.
