= Zhang Zhao =

Zhang Zhao may refer to:

- Zhang Zhao (Eastern Wu) (156–236), politician and scholar of the late-Han and Eastern Wu dynasties
- Zhang Zhao (Five Dynasties) (894–972), politician and scholar of the Five Dynasties and Song dynasty
- Zhang Zhao (Qing dynasty) (1691–1745), Qing dynasty politician and scholar
