= Zhang Zhao (Five Dynasties) =

Chinese historian, poet and official (894–972)

- Traditional Chinese: 張昭
- Simplified Chinese: 张昭
Transcriptions
Standard Mandarin
- Hanyu Pinyin: Zhāng Zhāo
- Wade–Giles: Chang^{1} Chao^{1}

Zhang Zhaoyuan
- Traditional Chinese: 張昭遠
- Simplified Chinese: 张昭远
Transcriptions
Standard Mandarin
- Hanyu Pinyin: Zhāng Zhāoyuǎn

Zhang Qianfu
- Traditional Chinese: 張潛夫
- Simplified Chinese: 张潜夫
Transcriptions
Standard Mandarin
- Hanyu Pinyin: Zhāng Qiánfū

Zhang Zhao (894–972), known as Zhang Zhaoyuan before 947, courtesy name Qianfu, was a Chinese scholar-official, historian, and poet during the Five Dynasties period and early Song dynasty. He served in the imperial government of the Later Tang, Later Jin, Later Han, Later Zhou and Song dynasties. Today, Zhang Zhao is best known for his contributions to Tang dynasty and Five Dynasties history, as a main author of Old Book of Tang and many Veritable Records since Li Siyuan.

== Early life ==
Zhang Zhao (born Zhang Zhaoyuan) claimed descent from Zhang Er (died 202 BC). In the late Tang dynasty, his grandfather Zhang Chuping (張楚平) served as a county magistrate in Shouzhang County (壽張, around modern Yanggu County, Shandong). Some time during the upheavals of the late 870s and early 880s, Zhang Chuping disappeared on his way to the Tang capital Chang'an, which was captured by rebels under Huang Chao in 881.

More than a decade later, Zhang Zhaoyuan's father Zhang Zhi (張直) received an appointment under the military governor (warlord) Wang Shifan, who ruled over Pinglu Circuit (平盧) on the Shandong peninsula, headquartered in Qing Prefecture. Wang Shifan actively opened schools and filled them with Confucian scholars he recruited, Zhang Zhi among them. Zhang Zhi taught the classics like I Ching and Spring and Autumn Annals.

Before he turned 10, Zhang Zhaoyuan was already able to recite many poems and essays. Before he turned 20, he had read and understood all Confucian classics. He was arrogant towards his peers, and even thought little of Ma Rong (79–166) and Zheng Xuan (127–200). In 905, Wang Shifan was forced to leave Pinglu by the powerful warlord Zhu Wen, who had defeated him in 903. (In 907, Zhu Wen ended the Tang dynasty and established his own Later Liang dynasty.) At some point after 905, Zhang Zhi moved his family to Zanhuang County in Zhao Prefecture, which was controlled by the warlord Wang Rong, who was, at least nominally, a vassal of Zhu Wen's Later Liang.

In Zanhuang, Zhang Zhaoyuan met a historian surnamed Cheng (程), who believed that history was the only subject through which a serious Confucian could learn practical political skills. Under Cheng's guidance, Zhang mastered the "Thirteen Histories" (13 official history books) in 5–7 years. Because of the unstable political situation during the Later Liang, Zhang Zhaoyuan had to till the land to support his family. He did, however, annotate On the Rise and Fall of Ten Dynasties (十代興亡論) by Zhu Jingze (635–709) during this time.

== During Later Tang ==
The Jin ruler Li Cunxu conquered the Zhao territory in 922, and later established the Later Tang dynasty which conquered the Later Liang in 923. Like many unemployed scholars, Zhang Zhaoyuan brought dozens of scrolls of his writings to the Later Tang military hoping to find employment. There he met Zhang Xian (張憲), the Wei Prefecture prefect. Zhang Xian was an avid reader of history and the classics; the two hit it off right away. Zhang Zhaoyuan was named a prefectural judge (推官), and later a probationary investigating censor (監察御史裏行). When Zhang Xian was named the prefect of the Northern Capital (i.e. Taiyuan) in December 925, Zhang Zhaoyuan followed him there.

In May 926, Li Cunxu was killed in a mutiny, and Li Cunxu's half-brother Li Siyuan — who had the support of the mutineers — was in the best position to assume the throne. Li Cunzhao (李存沼), a relative of Li Cunxu's arrived in Taiyuan from the capital Luoyang, claiming Li Cunxu sent him. Zhang Zhaoyuan advised Zhang Xian to arrest Li Cunzhao and send a message to Li Siyuan pleading his allegiance, but Zhang Xian refused, citing his indebtedness to Li Cunxu. Fearing that Li Cunzhao could try to take over Taiyuan's command with the help of two eunuchs who had arrived much earlier, general Fu Yanchao (符彥超) ignored Zhang Xian's instruction and slaughtered Li Cunzhao and the two eunuchs. When Fu Yanchao's soldiers arrested Zhang Zhaoyuan, he allegedly said "When a lord is humiliated, his subject dies without regret." Fu Yanchao praised and released him, but forced him to write announcements to calm the public. Zhang Xian fled and was eventually executed on orders of Li Siyuan, who indeed succeeded as emperor of Later Tang.
