= Floriana Garo =

Albanian television presenter and Miss Albania (born 1987)

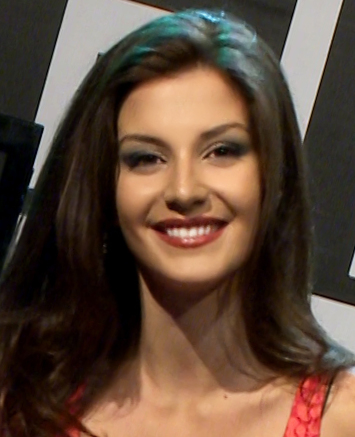
- Garo in 2013
- Born: 15 February 1987 (age 39); Durrës, PSR Albania
- Education: City College of New York
- Occupations: Spokesperson, Television presenter, journalist
- Height: 1.80 m (5 ft 11 in)
- Partner: Enis Daci
- Children: Adia Daci, Priam Daci
- Relatives: Sofokli Garo and Teuta Garo
- Beauty pageant titleholder
- Title: Miss World Albania 2012
- Hair color: Brown
- Eye color: Brown
- Major competitions: Miss World Albania 2012 (Winner); Miss World 2012 (Unplaced)
- Website: florianagaro.al

Floriana Garo (born 15 February 1987) is an Albanian television presenter, political spokesperson and former Miss Albania.

She represented Albania in the Miss World 2012 beauty pageant.

Garo was the first host of the entertainment show Jo Vetem Mode on TV Klan as well as the first weather presenter on Albania's ABC News. In addition, she has also been the brand ambassador for Albania's Cortefiel clothing since 2011.

== Early life and education ==
Born in Durrës, she is the daughter of college professor Sofokli Garo and Teuta Garo, a physician. In 2002, she and her family moved to the United States where she lived for eight years.

Garo is a graduate of the City College of New York having studied international relations and played on the university volleyball team, winning Player of the Year in 2007 and 2009. She is fluent in English, Albanian, Italian, and French.

== Career ==
=== Jo Vetem Modë ===
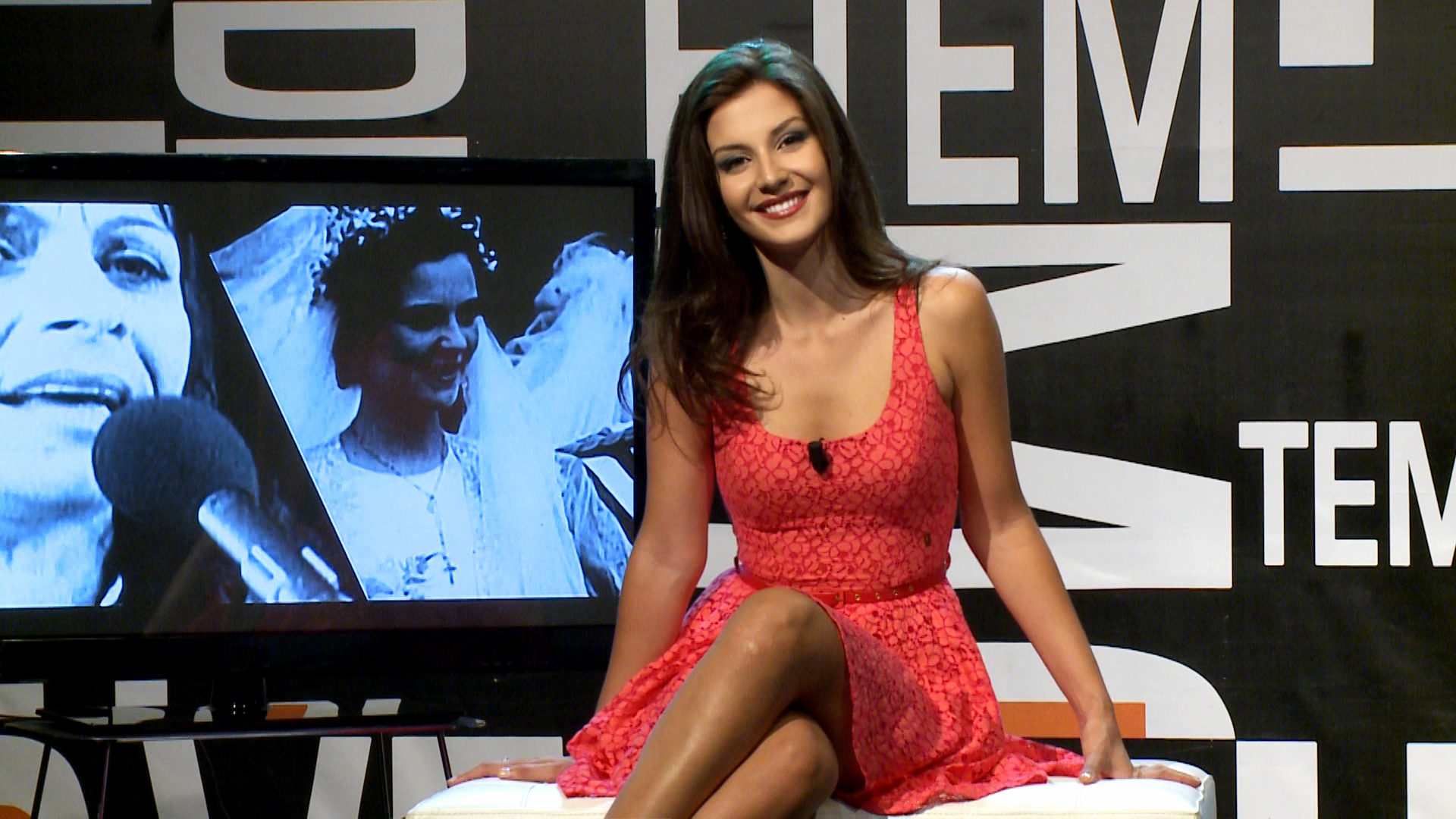

"Jo vetem mode", in English "Not only fashion", is a lifestyle show in Albania, which airs on national TV Klan. The 60 minute program, which started on 16 February 2013 is hosted and written by Floriana Garo. It is currently in its 4th Season with 28.9 shares rating.

"Jo vetem mode" featured profiles of Albanian celebrities, athletes and politicians among which the First Lady of Albania, Odeta Nishani, Minister of Defense Mimi Kodheli, Politician/Lawyer Spartak Ngjela, Lazio's football player Lorik Cana, the captain of the US Olympic Volleyball team Donald Suxho, the famous clothing designer Ema Savahl, supermodel Angela Martini, etc.

"Jo vetem mode" had a great influence in promoting tourism and new cultures by featuring tourist destinations for Albanians to explore as well as promote Albania's landscapes. The show explored new and luxurious travel and leisure destinations in Albania and Europe such as Sueno Deluxe resort in Turkey, Radika Ski resort in Macedonia, Queen ELizabeth Cruiseship, Sunshine hotel in Greece, Splendor Hotel in Dhërmi, Albania, etc.

"Jo vetem mode" took viewers inside some of the most important buildings in Albania such as the Palace of the Brigades, the new Ministry of Culture, Prime Minister's Office as well as inside the residences of the Ambassador of Brazil and the ambassador of Kuwait in Albania. The program covered the latest fashion and cultural events such as the World Fashion week in Paris, Geraldina Sposa Bridal shows, Miss Universe Albania, the annual Presidential ball, etc. In addition, it informed people of interesting activities to try in Albania such as helicopter rides, horseback riding, paragliding, wine tours and hiking in the Albanian Alps.

"Jo vetem mode" was a point of reference for everyone who appreciates beauty, wanted to be inspired, and was looking for new and interesting things to do in Albania and beyond. The show was watched by Albanians all over the world through the Digital Platforms and has hundreds of thousands of views on YouTube.

=== Other activities ===
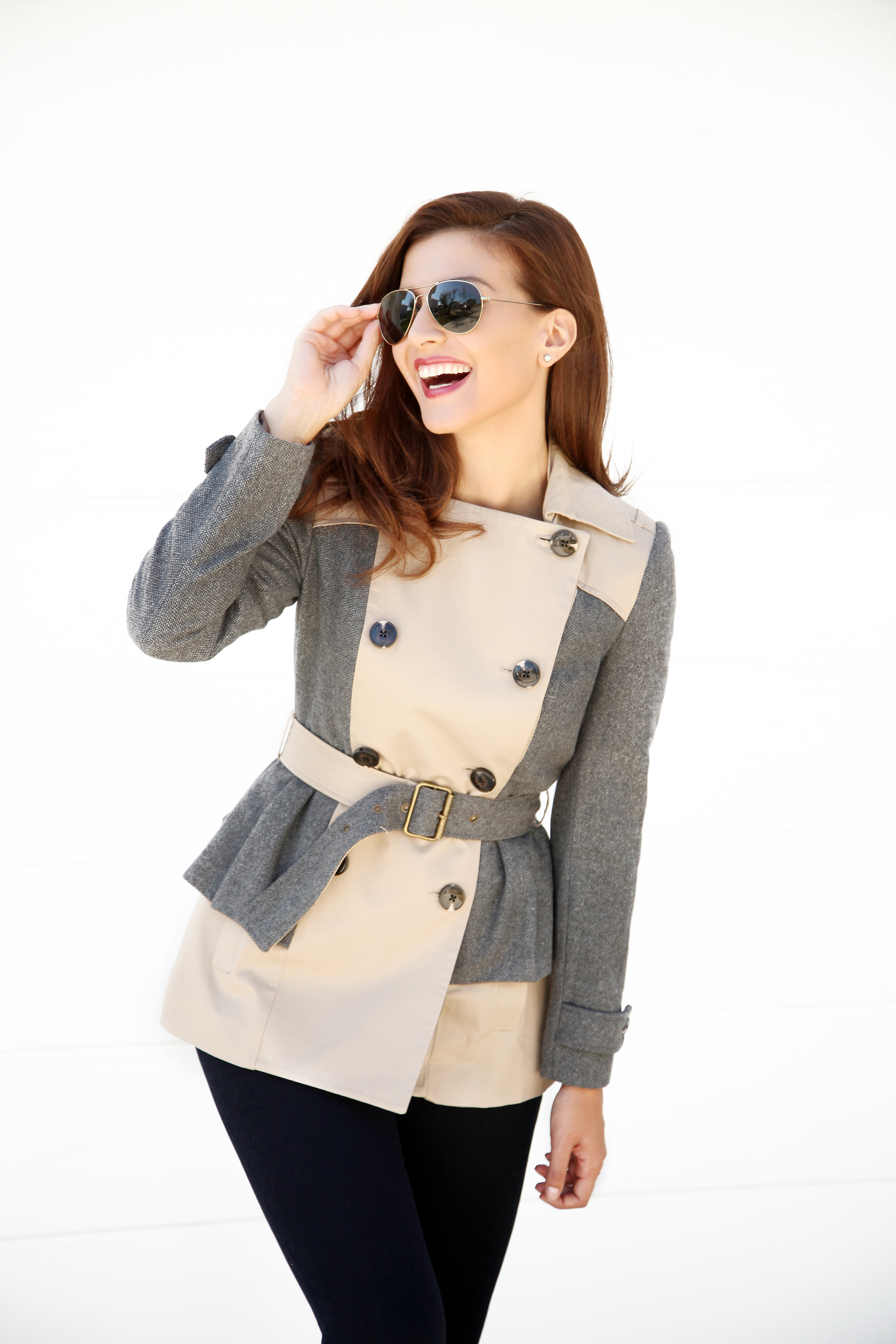
Floriana Garo

Floriana was the first director and host of "Jo vetem mode" lifestyle show on the national TV Klan. She was also the first weather presenter for ABC News Albania.

She represented Albania in Miss World 2012 in Ordos, China. This experience jump started her television career and made her even more well known for the Albanian public. In 2012, Garo presented a concert during the 100th Anniversary of the Independence of Albania in Nene Teresa Square (Mother Teresa Square). She co-presented Miss Globe 2013 along with Gent Bejko and in November 2013, she presented the book fair in Tirana. Garo is the official spokesmodel for Cortefiel Albania clothing brand. She has been in various television commercials for this brand.

She modeled for Geraldina Sposa bridal shows in 2012, 2013, and 2014. Garo has been on the covers of "Living", "Icon", "VIP", " Coffee", Shije, Mapo Madame, Jeta and Klan magazines.

== Personal life ==
In 2017, Garo moved to Geneva to start a family with her husband, Swiss-Albanian lawyer Enis Daci. The couple has two children, Adia and Priam.

Since January 2021, Garo has moved to Tirana with her family to contribute in the Democratic Party as the official campaign spokesperson in the parliamentary elections.

== See also ==
- List of Albanians
- List of City College of New York alumni
- List of television presenters
