= Old Book of Tang =

Classic historical work about the Tang dynasty in China

- Traditional Chinese: 舊唐書
- Simplified Chinese: 旧唐书
Transcriptions
Standard Mandarin
- Hanyu Pinyin: Jiù Tángshū
- Wade–Giles: Chiu^{4} T'ang^{2}-shu^{1}
Yue: Cantonese
- Jyutping: Gau6 Tong4-syu1
Southern Min
- Hokkien POJ: Kū Tông-su (col.); Kiū Tông-su (lit.)

Alternative Chinese name
- Traditional Chinese: 唐書
- Simplified Chinese: 唐书
Transcriptions
Standard Mandarin
- Hanyu Pinyin: Tángshū
- Wade–Giles: T'ang^{2}-shu^{1}
Yue: Cantonese
- Jyutping: Tong4-syu1
Southern Min
- Hokkien POJ: Tông-su

The Old Book of Tang, or simply the Book of Tang, is the first classic historical work about the Tang dynasty, comprising 200 chapters, and is one of the Twenty-Four Histories. Originally compiled during the Five Dynasties and Ten Kingdoms period (10th century AD), it was superseded by the New Book of Tang, which was compiled in the Song dynasty, but later regained acceptance.

The credited editor was chief minister Liu Xu, but the bulk (if not all) of the editing work was actually completed by his predecessor Zhao Ying. The authors include Zhang Zhao, Jia Wei (賈緯), and Zhao Xi (趙熙).

== Structure ==
The Old Book of Tang comprises 200 volumes. Volumes 1–20 contain the annals of the Tang emperors. Twitchett notes that coverage over time in the annals is most dense during the early and middle Tang, including only very sparse information in the late Tang after 847.

Volumes 21–50 contain treatises, including rites, music, calendar, astronomy, five elements, geography, officials, carriages and clothes, literature, food and commodities, and law. The section on rites (volumes 21–27) is the longest and most detailed, showing the relative importance placed on ceremonial matters. This section includes descriptions of temple design, sacrifices, and festivals. The section on geography (volumes 38–41) contains a description of the regional administration of the Tang empire around the year 752. The section on officials (volumes 42–44) contains a description of the Tang administrative system. The section on the five elements (五行) contains a description of earthquakes, floods, and other natural events.

Volumes 51–200 contain biographical related content, including empresses and consorts (51–52), imperial families, and the peoples populating the areas bordering the Tang empire (194–200).

== History ==
The book's compiling began when the Later Jin's founding emperor Shi Jingtang ordered its compilation in 941. The original chief editor was Zhao Ying, who was also the chancellor then. However, by the time of its completion, Liu Xu had become chancellor and taken over the work of organisation; as a result he was credited as chief editor when the work was presented on 12 July 945 to Emperor Chu of Jin.

Being a relatively quickly compiled work of official history, the Old Book of Tang was a compilation of earlier annals, now lost; it further incorporates other monographs and biographies, using as sources (for instance) the Tongdian of Du You. These sources were often directly copied from records and earlier histories, and the result would be severely criticised during the Northern Song; Emperor Renzong of Song, for example, called the book "poorly organised, burdened with unimportant details, wanting in style and poorly researched". These errors even included duplicated biographies of characters.

Because of these criticisms, in 1044 a new history of the Tang dynasty was commissioned; with Ouyang Xiu and Song Qi as editors, the New Book of Tang was then produced. After the New Book was presented, the original Old Book of Tang went out of print, and over centuries it became very rare. It was during the Ming dynasty when the remaining copies were gathered and the book was once again published, eventually becoming canonised as one of the Twenty-Four Histories.
