= Davidson Garrett =

American poet

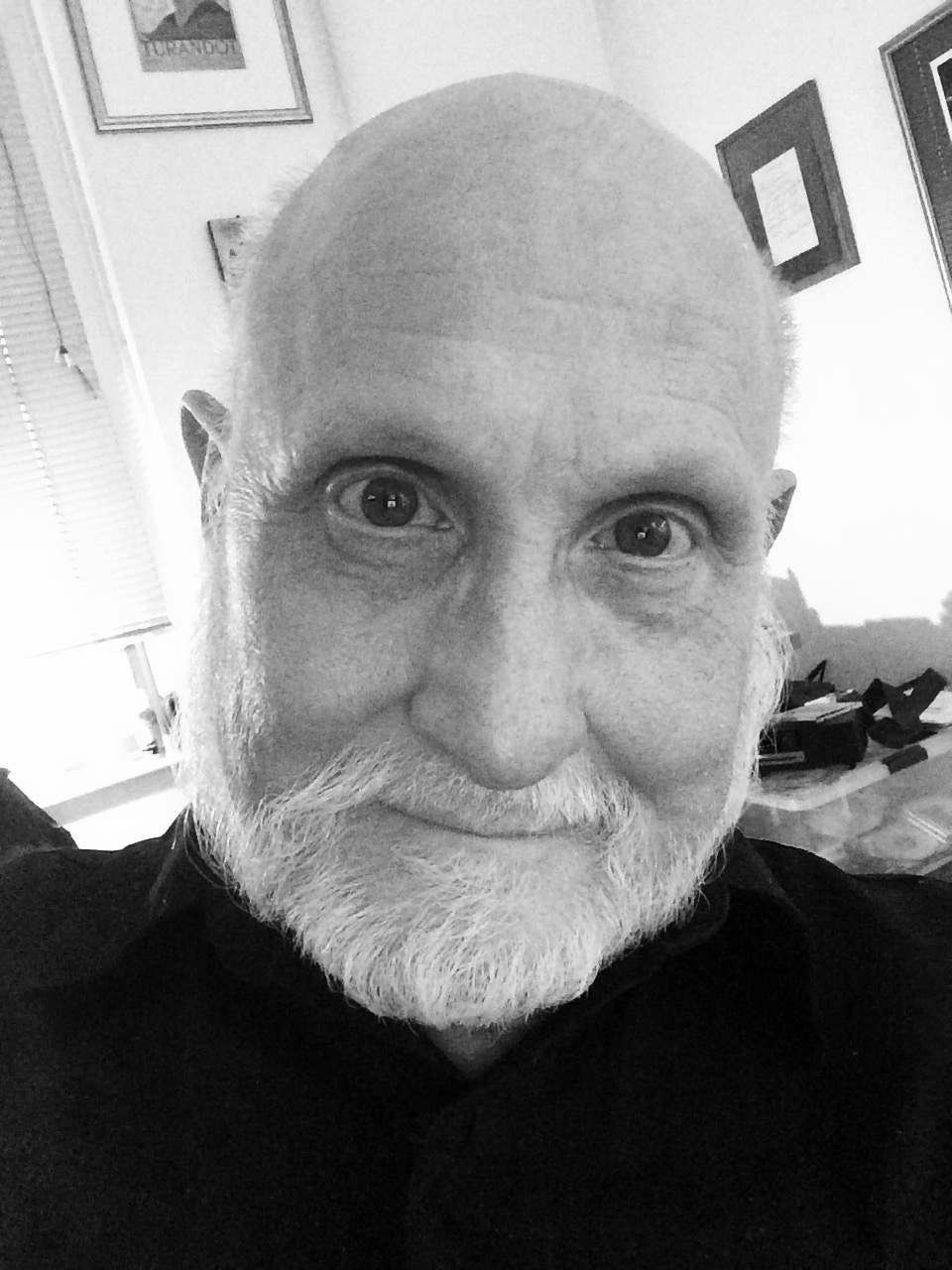
- Davidson Garrett in 2016
- Born: September 11, 1952 (age 74); Shreveport, Louisiana, U.S.
- Occupations: Writer, poet, actor
- Writing career
- Notable works: King Lear of the Taxi: Musings of a New York City Actor/Taxi Driver; Arias of a Rhapsodic Spirit

Davidson Garrett (born September 11, 1952), also known as "King Lear of the Taxi", is an American poet and actor living in New York City, New York. He drove a New York City yellow taxicab from 1978 until 2018 to supplement his acting and writing career. He has authored seven books of poetry, and has been published in many literary magazines, and poetry journals.

As an actor, Garrett appeared in verse plays of William Shakespeare, W.H. Auden, and T.S. Eliot in New York City. As a member of SAG-AFTRA, he worked for many years in television and film, appearing on All My Children, Guiding Light, Spin City, Oz, The Sopranos, Law & Order, New York Undercover, As the World Turns, and PBS's award-winning documentary, Something Within Me.

Garrett also toured in theater extensively in the United States and in Europe, performing for the United Service Organizations. In 2017, his spoken word play, Conspiracy Theory: The Mysterious Death of Dorothy Kilgallen, was performed for the Boog City Poets Theater.

== Early life ==
Garrett was born September 11, 1952, in Shreveport, Louisiana, the son of Fred Davidson Garrett, a hardware salesman, and Viola Brown Garrett, a florist.

Garrett graduated from Fair Park High School in 1970. He studied theater arts for two years at Centenary College of Louisiana.

He moved to New York City in 1972 to pursue an acting career, and also because he is gay and was looking for a supportive community. He studied at the American Academy of Dramatic Arts, and studied acting with Alice Spivak at the Herbert Berghof Studio in Greenwich Village. He graduated from The City College of New York with a B.A. in Liberal Arts and an M.S. in Education.

Garrett lived at the McBurney YMCA in the Manhattan neighborhood of Chelsea from 1978 until 2000. This was the YMCA on which the Village People based their pop song anthem, "Y.M.C.A."

== Poetry ==
Garrett's poems and other writings have appeared in The New York Times, Xavier Review from New Orleans, Big City Lit, 2 Bridges Review from City University of New York, The Paddock Review, Sensations Magazine, Nerve Lantern, Impossible Archetype, First Literary Review-East, The Paterson Literary Review, Reverie Magazine, The Ekphrastic Review, The Stillwater Review, The Episcopal New Yorker, Marco Polo Arts Magazine, Conceit Magazine, Thorny Locust, and Podium, the online literary journal of the 92nd Street Y Unterberg Poetry Center. His poetry has been anthologized in several anthologies, including The Arcade of the Scribes (Rogue Scholars Press, 2023), Stonewall’s Legacy (Local Gems Press 2019), From Somewhere To Nowhere: The End of the “American Dream (Autonomedia, 2017), Beyond the Rift: Poets of the Palisades (The Poets Press, 2010), and Pears, Prose and Poetry (Poets Wear Prada / Eggplant Press, 2011).

Garrett has authored seven books of poetry, the most recent, Miss Price & Me: A Verse Memoir, published by Kelsay Books in 2026, followed by Cabaletta: Poems of a New York City Taxi Driver, published in 2022 by Finishing Line Press, Arias of a Rhapsodic Spirit, a full-length collection, was released in 2020 by Kelsay Books, and two chapbooks, What Happened to the Man Who Taught Me Beowulf? and Other Poems, released in 2017, and Southern Low Protestant Departure: A Funeral Poem, released in 2015. An earlier chapbook, To Tell The Truth I Wanted To Be Kitty Carlisle and Other Poems, was published by Finishing Line Press in 2013.

Garrett's first full-length collection, King Lear of the Taxi: Musings of a New York City Actor/Taxi Driver, was published in 2006 by Advent Purple Press.

In 2013, Garrett was invited to take part in a taxi drivers' writing workshop organized by the poet Mark Nowak and sponsored by the PEN World Voices Festival. He and two other members of the workshop, Seth Goldman and John McDonagh, read their taxi poems at "Watching the Meter: Poetry from the Taxi Drivers Workshop" at The Public Theater's Joe's Pub in New York City. The New York Times reviewed this event, dubbing the three taxi drivers "The Bards of Gridlock."

In November 2017, Garrett's poem "A Taxi Driver's Die Gotterdammerung" was included in the poetry anthology From Somewhere to Nowhere: The End of the American Dream, published by Autonomedia, a nationally known publisher of radical books. The poem documents Garrett's actual experience when his yellow taxi was parked under the North Tower of the World Trade Center at the moment the first plane hit the tower on September 11, 2001.

On May 1, 2023, Garrett was invited along with other members of the PEN Worker Writers School to celebrate International Workers' Day in a reading of cinquains in Brooklyn Bridge Park sponsored by the Dia Art Foundation. As each cinquain was read, its text was projected on the stanchion of the Brooklyn Bridge. This was the first time in the history of the Brooklyn Bridge that poetry was projected onto it.

== Spoken word, performance ==
Garrett has performed spoken word plays, poetry, and more, primarily in the New York City region.

In the autumn of 2005, Garrett's satirical verse play The Tragedy of MacCheney premiered in a staged reading at Grover Cleveland Birthplace in Caldwell, New Jersey, with Garrett performing all the characters in front of the fireplace in the historic living room. The event, which featured poets reflecting on the U.S. presidential election of 2004, was part of Sensations Magazine's Creative Events Series.

In December 2008, at the Robinson Plantation House, a historic home in Clark, New Jersey built in 1690, Garrett performed all of Shakespeare's King Lear monologues in a program titled "The Poetry of Shakespeare's King Lear." The event was sponsored by Sensations Magazine.

In 2009, 2010, and 2016, Garrett performed in poet Joel Allegretti's tribute to Leonard Cohen, "You Know Who I Am", produced by Greenwich Village's legendary Cornelia Street Cafe.

Garrett was cast in the play Ishtar Redux by poet John J. Trause, which was staged in 2013 at La MaMa Experimental Theatre Club in an evening of performance works produced by the performance artist journal Nerve Lantern.

On May Day, 2014, Garrett was invited to be part of the 40th anniversary celebration of the Nuyorican Poets Cafe, where he read his poetry with poets from the Worker Writers School, sponsored by PEN World Voices. Also featured in the program was United States Poet Laureate Natasha Trethewey

In August 2015, Garrett was invited to the Boog City Poets' Theatre in the East Village, Manhattan, to perform a new poetic monologue with incidental music, titled "Nine Meditations on the Nothingness of Now." He collaborated with musician Michael Skliar.

Flushing Town Hall, a cultural arts organization in the Borough of Queens, invited Garrett to give a solo outdoor poetry reading in Diversity Plaza in June 2016, as part of a cultural program celebrating LGBTQ Pride Month in Jackson Heights.

In December 2016, the William Carlos Williams Poetry Cooperative of Southern Bergen County, New Jersey invited Davidson Garrett to be the featured poet for their monthly poetry series. He performed his entire funeral poem, "Southern Low Protestant Departure", at the William Carlos Williams Center for the Performing Arts in Rutherford, New Jersey.

In January 2017, Garrett was invited to read his original poems about the 1960s in a series of four spoken word shows at Cornelia Street Cafe, titled "What Were The Sixties Really Like?", which were produced and curated by poet and playwright Kathyn Adisman.

In 2017, Garrett's spoken word play Conspiracy Theory: The Mysterious Death of Dorothy Kilgallen was performed at the Boog City Poets' Theater Festival, curated by poet Joel Allegretti. The play was published in Issue 8 of the performance art journal Nerve Lantern.

In December 2020, 2021, and 2022, Garrett was invited by the Church of the Transfiguration, Episcopal (Manhattan), also known as the Little Church Around the Corner, to give special poetry readings commemorating World AIDS Day.

== Awards and honors ==
Garrett's manuscript Taxi Dreams was a finalist in the 2000 Gival Press chapbook competition. That chapbook evolved into his first poetry collection, King Lear of the Taxi.

In 2009, Garrett was featured in an entire chapter about an incident with streetwalkers and an angry john who destroyed his taxi in Amy Braunschweiger's book Taxi Confidential: Life, Death and 3 a.m.: Revelations in New York City Cabs.

Garrett's poem about HIV/AIDS, "Death in Harlem Hospital with Straussian Overtones: 1986," received Honorable Mention in December 2007, for Poet of the Month, by the Foundation For Creative Expression in San Francisco, and was published on the website of that city's Beat Museum.

Garrett was nominated for a Pushcart Prize in 2011. In 2012, he was featured in New York Magazine in the article "I Drive A Taxi But I Also…" by award-winning journalist Kate Lowenstein.

In June 2014, Garrett was awarded first place in the second annual Juanita Torrence-Thompson International Poetry Competition, sponsored by Amulet Poetry Magazine.

Garrett has been featured reading his poetry on WNYC Radio's Morning Edition, and also WBAI radio in New York City.

== Curation ==
In August 2016 and September 2018, Garrett was the curator for Poets' Theater at the Annual Boog City Music, Poetry and Theater Festival, presenting eight short plays both years at the legendary SideWalk Cafe in the East Village, Manhattan. For 2016's program, he presented excerpts from poet Zhang Er's opera libretto Tacoma Method.

On September 30, 2018, Garrett was invited to be the poetry curator of "An Afternoon of Poetry in Albert's Garden," a half-century-old community garden near the Bowery. For this reading, Garrett invited poets Jeffrey Cyphers Wright, John J. Trause, Hilary Sideris, Austin Alexis, and Jessica Nooney to read from their recently published works. Garrett served as MC for the special event held in the Shade Garden, and he ended the reading with his recently published poem, "Texas Wildflowers in Spring: In Memory of Lady Bird Johnson."

== Filmography ==
In 2025, Garrett was interviewed by the American LGBTQ+ Museum for its oral history "Queer Legacies Project", which was filmed in the library of the Edith Windsor Room at SAGE in New York City. His interview appears in Episode 4 of the "Queer Legacies Project Series", available on YouTube.

In 2019, Garrett was the subject of the short film "The Taxi Cab Poet: Davidson Garrett" by filmmaker Zardon Richardson. The film was screened at a program at the Jerome L. Greene Performance Space at WNYC Radio, as a part of the PEN World Voices Festival. Also featured in the same program was former poet laureate Sonia Sanchez.

In September 2008, texts from Garrett's book King Lear of the Taxi were used for the short film "Taxi Driver," screened at the Portobello Film Festival in London, U.K. by director Ray Andrew Wilkes, with Garrett recording the voice-over for the film.

In 1993, Garrett was featured in the award-winning documentary Something Within Me, which premiered at the Sundance Film Festival and won the Audience Award Documentary. The documentary profiled St. Augustine School of the Arts in the South Bronx, where Garrett taught arts education for several years. Later, the film was broadcast on PBS and shown on Public Broadcasting stations throughout the United States.

== Publications ==
- Garrett, Davidson (2026). Miss Price & Me: A Verse Memoir. American Fork, Utah: Kelsay Books. ISBN 978-1-63980-915-8
- Garrett, Davidson (2022). Cabaletta: Poems of a New York City Taxi Driver. Georgetown, Kentucky: Finishing Line Press. ISBN 978-1646627271.
- Garrett, Davidson (2020). Arias of a Rhapsodic Spirit. American Fork, Utah: Kelsay Books. ISBN 978-1952326271.
- Garrett, Davidson (2017). What Happened to The Man Who Taught Me Beowulf? and Other Poems. New York City, New York: Advent Purple Press. ISBN 978-0977444625.
- Garrett, Davidson (2015). Southern Low Protestant Departure: A Funeral Poem. New York City, New York: Advent Purple Press. ISBN 978-0977444618.
- Garrett, Davidson (2014). King Lear of the Taxi: Musings of a New York City Actor/Taxi Driver (3rd printing). New York City, New York: Advent Purple Press. ISBN 978-0977444601.
- Garrett, Davidson (2013). To Tell The Truth I Wanted To Be Kitty Carlisle and Other Poems. Georgetown, Kentucky: Finishing Line Press. ISBN 978-1622292790.
