= Margaret Rosario =

American psychologist

- Occupation: Distinguished Professor of Psychology
- Awards: APA Division 44 Award for Distinguished Contributions to Ethnic Minority Issues (2008); APA Division 44 Award for Distinguished Scientific Contribution (2012); Society for the Scientific Study of Sexuality Distinguished Scientific Achievement Award (2021)

Academic background
- Education: Princeton University; New York University

Academic work
- Institutions: City University of New York––City College of New York and the CUNY Graduate Center

Margaret Rosario is a health psychologist who studies the development of sexual identity and health disparities associated with sexual orientation. Rosario was President of the American Psychological Association (APA) Division 44, the Society for Psychology of Sexual Orientation and Gender Diversity, from 2017-2018. Rosario received the APA Division 44 Award for Distinguished Contributions to Ethnic Minority Issues in 2008 and the Award for Distinguished Scientific Contributions in 2012, as well as the Society for the Scientific Study of Sexuality Distinguished Scientific Achievement Award in 2021.

Rosario is Distinguished Professor of Psychology at the City University of New York––City College of New York and the CUNY Graduate Center, and is Director of the CUNY Health and Identity Lab.

== Biography ==
Rosario received her B.A. degree in psychology at Princeton University in 1975. She attended graduate school at New York University where she obtained her master's degree in 1983 and her Ph.D. in psychology in 1985. Her dissertation titled "Acculturation: Its causes and psychological symptom effects in Puerto Rican women" was supervised by Marybeth Shinn.

Rosario completed postdoctoral training at the HIV Center for Clinical and Behavioral Studies, Department of Psychiatry at Columbia University Vagelos College of Physicians and Surgeons in 1991. Rosario is a Fellow of the American Psychological Association and the Society for the Scientific Study of Sexuality. She has served as the Associate Editor of the Journal of Sex Research and Annals of LGBTQ Public and Population Health.

Rosario's research focuses on biopsychosocial factors associated with health disparities, including substance use. Her team seeks to understand people's strengths and vulnerabilities that may directly or indirectly influence mental and physical health outcomes. Rosario's work examines how cultural and race/ethnic, and other background characteristics potentially affect how members of the LGBTQ community experience themselves, including their sexual identity development and coming-out experiences. Her research on LGBTQ youth has been supported by the National Institutes of Mental Health.

== Representative publications ==
- Rosario, Margaret; Hunter, Joyce; Maguen, Shira; Gwadz, Marya; Smith, Raymond (1 February 2001). "The Coming-Out Process and Its Adaptational and Health-Related Associations Among Gay, Lesbian, and Bisexual Youths: Stipulation and Exploration of a Model". American Journal of Community Psychology. 29 (1): 133–160. doi:10.1023/A:1005205630978. S2CID 23619995.
- Rosario, Margaret; Schrimshaw, Eric W.; Hunter, Joyce (2004). "Ethnic/racial differences in the coming-out process of lesbian, gay, and bisexual youths: A comparison of sexual identity development over time". Cultural Diversity and Ethnic Minority Psychology. 10 (3): 215–228. doi:10.1037/1099-9809.10.3.215. PMID 15311975.
- Rosario, Margaret; Schrimshaw, Eric W.; Hunter, Joyce (2009). "Disclosure of sexual orientation and subsequent substance use and abuse among lesbian, gay, and bisexual youths: Critical role of disclosure reactions". Psychology of Addictive Behaviors. 23 (1): 175–184. doi:10.1037/a0014284. PMC 2818609. PMID 19290704.
- Rosario, Margaret; Schrimshaw, Eric W.; Hunter, Joyce (2011). "Different Patterns of Sexual Identity Development over Time: Implications for the Psychological Adjustment of Lesbian, Gay, and Bisexual Youths". The Journal of Sex Research. 48 (1): 3–15. doi:10.1080/00224490903331067. PMC 2914848. PMID 19916104.
- Rosario, Margaret; Schrimshaw, Eric W.; Hunter, Joyce; Braun, Lisa (February 2006). "Sexual identity development among lesbian, gay, and bisexual youths: Consistency and change over time". The Journal of Sex Research. 43 (1): 46–58. doi:10.1080/00224490609552298. PMC 3215279. PMID 16817067.
- Shinn, Marybeth; Rosario, Margaret; Mørch, Hanne; Chestnut, Dennis E. (1984). "Coping with job stress and burnout in the human services". Journal of Personality and Social Psychology. 46 (4): 864–876. doi:10.1037/0022-3514.46.4.864. PMID 6737197. ProQuest 614298272.
