= Marvin Chester =

American physicist

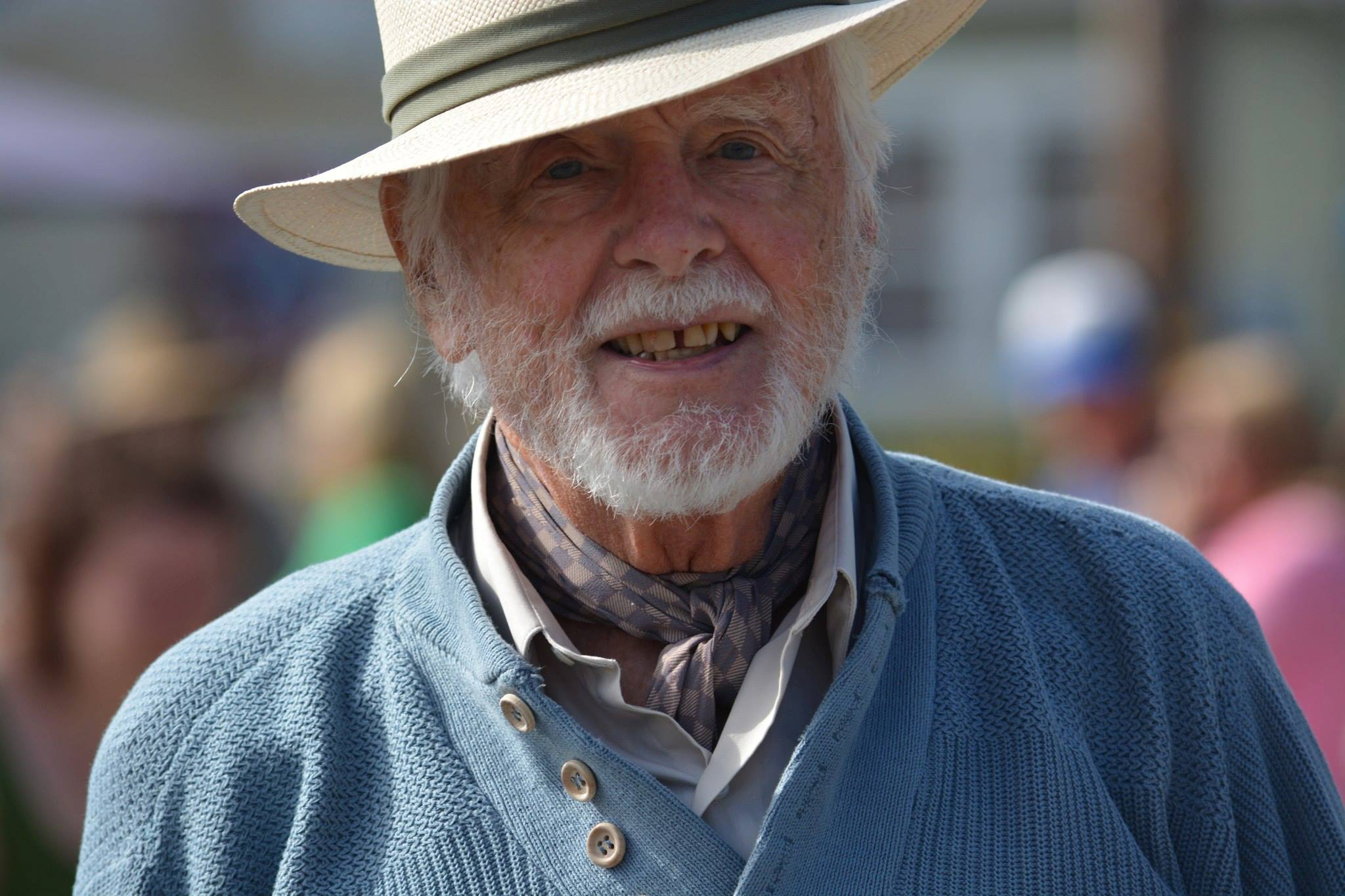
- Born: Marvin Chester; December 29, 1930; New York, New York
- Died: April 22, 2016 (aged 85); Santa Cruz, California, United States
- Education: California Institute of Technology
- Known for: Superfluid helium
- Spouse: Elfi Chester
- Awards: Alexander von Humboldt Research Award 1974
- Scientific career
- Fields: Physics; Superfluidity; Quantum Electrodynamics; Superconductivity; Condensed Matter Physics; Optoelectronics; Quantum Mechanics; Group Theory; Population Dynamics
- Workplaces: University of California, Los Angeles
- Thesis: Some experimental and theoretical observations on a configurational EMF (1961)
- Doctoral advisor: John R. Pellam; Richard Phillips Feynman
- Website: chesters.org/marvin/ divineneutrality.org

Marvin Chester (29 December 1930 in New York, New York – 22 April 2016) was a UCLA emeritus professor of Physics who specialized in quantum mechanics. After receiving his B.S. undergraduate degree from the City College of New York in 1952, he studied under Richard Feynman and John R. Pellam at California Institute of Technology where he received his Ph.D. in Physics in 1961. Thereafter he spent the following 31 years (1961 to 1992) as a faculty member in the Physics department at UCLA.

== Physics ==
Dr. Chester is perhaps best known for his text book for student physicists called Primer of Quantum Mechanics which connects the mathematical machinery of quantum mechanics directly to its philosophical underpinnings.

Among his more substantial contributions to the field, he predicted and demonstrated a Bernoulli Effect in the electron gas.

He is known for playing with and challenging the formal constructs of the scientific publication. One example of this can be found in An experiment regarding the wave function of superfluid helium; A published technical description of an experiment to detect the diffraction, because of its order parameter wave function property, of bulk superfluid helium flow through a grating - written in rhymed verse.

== Symmetry & Identity ==
He showed that the notion of identity (identification) is connected to the concept of symmetry. He established the connection via the mathematical apparatus of group theory, the abstract formulation of symmetry.

== Population Dynamics ==
He proposed that the following statement is a fundamental principle governing nature: "The effect on the environment of a population’s success is to alter that environment in a way that opposes the success." By showing how to formulate it quantitatively he enabled the principle to be tested empirically in the laboratory.
