= Vera S. Paster =

American psychologist

- Occupation: Counseling psychologist
- Awards: Lifetime Achievement Award from the Society for the Psychological Study of Ethnic Minority Issues (APA, Division 45); Vera S. Paster Award given by the Global Alliance for Behavioral Health and Social Justice

Academic background
- Education: Hunter College; Clark University

Academic work
- Institutions: City College of New York, City University of New York

Vera S. Paster (1925 – 2015) was a clinical psychologist known for her contributions to ethnic minority issues and mental health.

Paster was President of the American Orthopsychiatric Association from 1986 to 1987 after being named Psychologist of the Year by the Association of Black Psychologists. She served as President of the Society for the Psychological Study of Ethnic Minority Issues (American Psychological Association, Division 45) from 1993 to 1994. In 2001, she was awarded the Lifetime Achievement Award from the Society for the Psychological Study of Ethnic Minority Issues and the Carl Rogers Award from the Society for Humanistic Psychology (American Psychological Association, Division 32).

== Biography ==
Paster was born in New York City. She spent her early years in Mount Vernon, NY before moving to the Bronx as a teenager. Paster attended Hunter College High School. She completed her undergraduate degree at Hunter College. She attended graduate school at Clark University where she obtained a master's degree in psychology. She subsequently worked as the Director of the Bureau of Child Guidance at the New York City Board of Education, where she supervised other psychologists. After completing her PhD at New York University, she taught in the clinical psychology doctoral program at City College of New York, CUNY.

Paster served on President Jimmy Carter's Commission on Mental Health, Task Force on Primary Prevention and was the Commissioner for Child and Adolescent Services for the Department of Mental Health of the State of Massachusetts.

As a clinical psychologist, Paster stressed the empowerment and relevance of mental health services, and she convinced other psychologists of this as well. Paster founded the "Links and Shoulders", an annual graduate student mentoring event held at APA Convention and sponsored by Division 45. The Global Alliance for Behavioral Health and Social Justice gives an annual award in Paster's honor to a graduate student, post graduate student or fellow in a behavioral health or social justice program who "contributes significantly to the social, education, physical, or psychological well-being of persons of color."

Paster was married to George Nicholas (Nic) Paster, who also taught at City College of New York, CUNY.

== Books ==
- Diggs, A. D., & Paster, V. S. (2000). Staying married: A guide for African American couples. Kensington Books.

== Representative publications ==
- Davis III, T., & Paster, V. S. (2000). Nurturing resilience in early adolescence: A tool for future success. Journal of College Student Psychotherapy, 15(2), 17–33.
- Paster, V. S. (1985). Adapting psychotherapy for the depressed, unacculturated, acting-out, Black male adolescent. Psychotherapy: Theory, Research, Practice, Training, 22(2S), 408–417.
- Paster, V. S. (1986). A social action model of intervention for difficult to reach populations. American Journal of Orthopsychiatry, 56(4), 625–629.
- Paster, V. S. (1997). Emerging perspectives in child mental health services. In R. J. Illback, C. T. Cobb, & H. M. Joseph, Jr. (Eds.), Integrated services for children and families: Opportunities for psychological practice (pp. 259–279). American Psychological Association.
