= Lin Peng (professor) =

Professor of finance

Academic background
- Education: Duke University
- Thesis: Information and asset prices (2002)

Lin Peng holds the Krell Chair in Finance at the City University of New York. She is known for her work on behavioral economics.

== Education and career ==
Peng received her M.A. in biology from Wesleyan University in 1998. She earned a Ph.D. from Duke University in 2002. As of 2024 she holds the Krell Chair in Finance at the City University of New York.

== Research ==
Peng is known for her work on social networks and behavioral economics. She has examined how memes impact people's view of financial markets. In 2022 she quantified the impressions people gather from images to consider the reliability of a financial prediction.

== Selected publications ==
- Peng, Lin (2005). "Learning with Information Capacity Constraints". Journal of Financial and Quantitative Analysis. 40 (2): 307–329. doi:10.1017/S0022109000002325. ISSN 1756-6916.
- Peng, Lin; Xiong, Wei (2006). "Investor attention, overconfidence and category learning". Journal of Financial Economics. 80 (3): 563–602. doi:10.1016/j.jfineco.2005.05.003.
- Peng, Lin; Röell, Ailsa (2007-01-31). "Executive pay and shareholder litigation*". Review of Finance. 12 (1): 141–184. doi:10.1093/rof/rfl003. ISSN 1573-692X.
