= Richard D. Gitlin =

American electrical engineer and academic

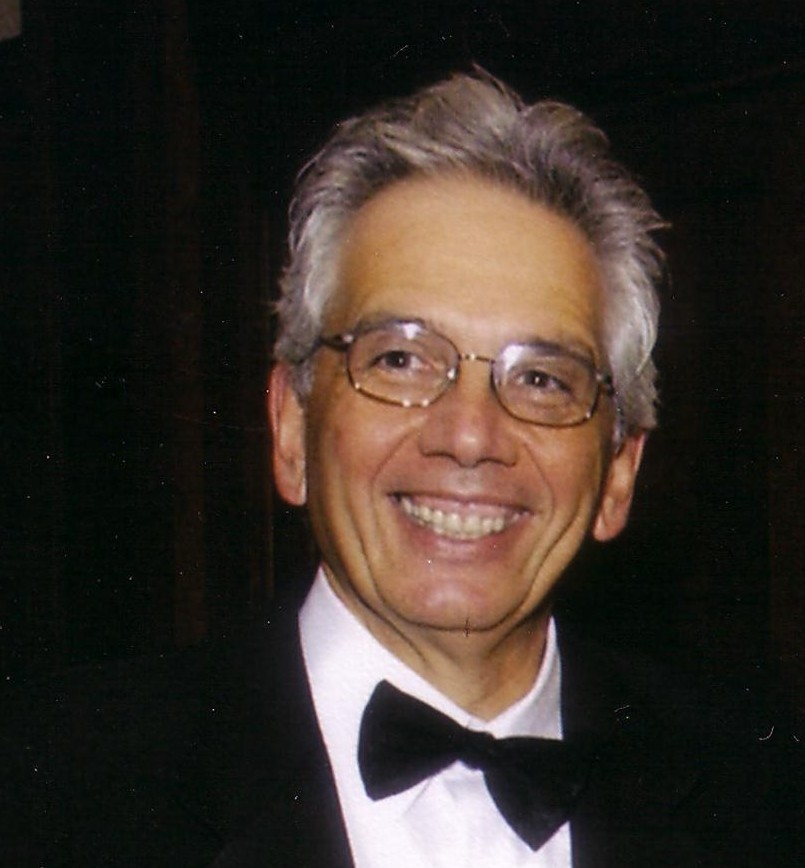
- Born: April 25, 1943 (age 83); Brooklyn, New York, U.S.
- Education: City College of New York, Columbia University
- Awards: IEEE Alexander Graham Bell Medal; AAAS Fellow; NAE Member; IEEE Fellow; Bell Labs Fellow; Florida Inventors Hall of Fame; ASEMFL; Stephen O. Rice Prize; Thomas Alva Edison Patent Award; IEEE Ellersick Award
- Scientific career
- Fields: Electrical engineering, Wireless communications, Computer networks, Telecommunications, Biomedical engineering
- Workplaces: Bell Labs, University of South Florida
- Website: http://iwinlab.eng.usf.edu/Gitlin.htm

Richard D. Gitlin (born April 25, 1943) is an electrical engineer, inventor, research executive, and academic whose principal places of employment were Bell Labs and the University of South Florida (USF). He is known for contributions to digital subscriber line (DSL) technology, multi-code CDMA, and the development of multiple-input multiple-output MIMO techniques for wireless communications, primarily during his career at Bell Labs. His later research at Columbia University included methods for integrating cellular and Wi-Fi networks through relay-network architectures.

== Education and career ==
Gitlin was born in Brooklyn, New York and graduated from the noted James Madison High School in 1959. He received a BEE (with honors) in electrical engineering from The City College of New York (CCNY) in 1964, followed by an MSEE in 1965 and a Doctor of Engineering Science in 1969, both from Columbia University. Gitlin's research, under the supervision of William R. Bennett, was in the area of adaptive signal processing used early machine learning techniques for signal classification and detection.

After receiving his doctorate, Gitlin joined Bell Laboratories, where he worked for 32 years in research and development of digital communications, broadband networking, and Wireless systems. His work there resulted in many innovative products, including: co-invention of DSL (digital subscriber line), invention of multicode CDMA (used in 3G wireless), and pioneering the use of smart antennas (“MIMO”) for wireless systems. Earlier in his career, Gitlin led the team that created the first V.32/V.34 duplex, high-speed modems that used echo cancellation, fractionally spaced equalization, and trellis coded modulation.

At his retirement in 2001, Gitlin was Senior VP for Communications and Networking Research at Bell Labs (then reorganized as Lucent), leading a multi-national research organization with over 500 professionals. After retiring from Bell Labs, he was visiting professor of Electrical Engineering at Columbia University, Chief Technology Officer of NEC Labs America, CTO of Hammerhead Systems, a venture funded networking company in Silicon Valley, and in 2008 he joined USF as a faculty member.

Gitlin is an elected member of the National Academy of Engineering and a Fellow of the Institute of Electrical and Electronics Engineers (IEEE), the American Association for the Advancement of Science (AAAS), and Bell Laboratories. He is also a Charter Fellow of the National Academy of Inventors and an inductee of the Florida Inventors Hall of Fame. His honors include the IEEE Alexander Graham Bell Medal, the Thomas Alva Edison Patent Award (co-recipient), and the S. O. Rice Prize in communications. He has co-authored a textbook on data communications, published more than 175 papers, and holds 78 U.S. patents.

He also served on the Board of Directors of PCTEL (NASDAQ: PCTI).

At the University of South Florida (USF), Gitlin was a State of Florida 21st Century Scholar, Distinguished University Professor, and the Agere Systems Chaired Professor of Electrical Engineering. Currently, he is Distinguished University Professor, Emeritus and a Professor in USF's Institute for Advanced Discovery & Innovation.

At USF his research had two major themes: (1) the intersection of communications with medicine to advance minimally invasive surgery and other cyber-physical health care systems and devices, such as a vectorcardiogram that uses machine learning to provide predictive 24/7 diagnostic quality cardiac care in a compact personal device and (2) creating novel, foundational technologies to ensure ultra-reliability, low latency, and other advanced technological capabilities for the emerging 5G wireless and IoT wireless networks, as well as future 6G wireless networks. He retired from USF in 2019.

Gitlin has co-authored a data communications text, published more than 175 papers, including 3 prize-winning papers, and holds 76 US patents. He currently lives with his wife, Barbara, in La Jolla, CA.

== Honors and awards ==
- IEEE Alexander Graham Bell Medal (2025)
- AAAS Fellow (2020)
- Academy of Science, Engineering, and Medicine of Florida (2018)
- Florida Inventors Hall of Fame (2017)
- Distinguished University Professor-University of South Florida (2013)
- Charter Fellow of the National Academy of Inventors (NAI) (2012)
- National Academy of Engineering, for “contributions to communications systems and networking” (2005)
- Thomas Alva Edison patent award from the R&D Council of New Jersey (2005)
- AT&T Bell Labs Fellow, for “contributions to data communications” (1987)
- IEEE Fellow for “contributions to data communications techniques” (1986)
- IEEE Communications Society Steven O. Rice Award (1995)
- IEEE Communications Society Frederick Ellersick Award (1994)
- Bell System Technical Journal Award (1982)
- Honor Societies: Tau Beta Pi, Eta Kappa Nu, and Sigma Xi
