= Milton Leitenberg =

American academic

- Occupations: Senior Research Associate, Center for International and Security Studies at Maryland, University of Maryland

Academic background
- Education: BSc Biology and Chemistry, City College of New York; MSc Biochemistry, Johns Hopkins University and Brandeis University

Academic work
- Discipline: Arms control
- Main interests: Weapons of mass destruction, biological warfare, bioterrorism, nuclear warfare, chemical warfare

Milton Leitenberg is an American academic specializing in arms control and weapons of mass destruction. He is a senior research associate with the Center for International and Security Studies at Maryland (CISSM), a division within the School of Public Policy at the University of Maryland.

== Education and early career ==
He received a bachelor of science in biology and chemistry from the City College of New York in 1955. He did graduate work in biochemistry at Johns Hopkins University and Brandeis University. After several years of research he taught at Vassar College, Northeastern University and Washington University in St. Louis. He transitioned to full time specialization in arms control in September 1966. In January 1968 he became the first American to work at the Stockholm International Peace Research Institute. Upon return to the United States, he became associated with university arms control research institutes, and published a series of books and papers on nuclear weapons, biological weapons, and arms control.

== Comments on COVID-19 outbreak ==
News agencies call upon him as an arms control expert, most recently to comment upon the possibility that the COVID-19 virus had escaped from one of the two virology laboratories in Wuhan, China. In a June 2020 article in the Bulletin of the Atomic Scientists he examined the evidence for an accidental escape of the virus from a laboratory. He concluded that such an escape is "a plausible, if unproven, possibility", as is the alternative explanation of a natural evolution in the field, and that the true source of the virus is currently unknown.

== The Soviet Biological Weapons Program: A History ==
In 2012, Leitenberg and Raymond A. Zilinskas co-authored The Soviet Biological Weapons Program: A History. A review in the journal Microbe described the book as "a significant source document for microbiologists, policy makers, historians, and students interested in this important subject". Tim Trevan writing in Nature called the book "an authoritative take on the Soviet Union's vast, covert and costly bioweapons programme" and "a major contribution to the field". Michael D. Gordin said in The Historian, "This is a magisterial history of something that was not supposed to exist." In a 15-page monograph from the Harvard-Sussex Program, John R. Walker said "Undoubtedly The Soviet Biological Weapons Program: A History will be the standard and definitive reference source on this issue for years to come... a thoroughly impressive achievement by any standard."

== See also ==
- Soviet biological weapons program

== Bibliography ==
- Leitenberg, M. (2020). The Question of Covid-19 Mortality in China, CBRNe World.
- Leitenberg, M. (2020). Soviet, Chinese, and North Korean False Allegations of Biological Weapons Use during the Korean War, Sources and Methods: A Blog of the History and Public Policy Program, Wilson Center.
- Leitenberg, M. (2020). Did the SARS-CoV-2 virus arise from a bat coronavirus research program in a Chinese laboratory? Very possibly. Bulletin of the Atomic Scientists.
- Leitenberg, M. (2019). Russian Disinformation Campaigns re Biological Weapons in the Putin Era [Presentation to the NDU/CNS Tucker CBW Symposium].
- Leitenberg, M. (2019). Putin and the Undoing of the INF Treaty. Memorandum, Center for International and Security Studies at Maryland.
- Leitenberg, M. (2018). The Hazards of Operations Involving Nuclear Weapons during the Cold War. Journal of Cold War Studies, 20(3), 207-249.
- Leitenberg, M. (2018). A Review of the Question of WMD Terrorism. Center for International and Security Studies at Maryland.
- Leitenberg, M. (2018). A History of the Russian and Soviet Chemical Weapons Program [Presentation at CISSM, School of Public Policy, University of Maryland, April 27, 2018].
- Leitenberg, M. (2016). China's False Allegations of the Use of Biological Weapons by the United States During the Korean War. Cold War International History Project (CWIHP) Working Paper Series, Woodrow Wilson International Center for Scholars, Working Paper # 78.
- Leitenberg, M. (2014). The Biological Weapons Program of the Soviet Union. Center for International and Security Studies at Maryland.
- Leitenberg, M. (2014), testimony, Subcommittee on Europe, Eurasia, and ND Emerging Threats of the Committee on Foreign Affairs House of Representatives Hearings: Assessing the Biological Weapons Threat: Russia and Beyond. 7 May 2014, 113th Congress. (video, transcript)
- Leitenberg, M., Zilinskas, R. A., & Kuhn, J. H. (2012). The Soviet Biological Weapons Program: A History. Harvard University Press.
- Leitenberg, M. (2012). North Korean Genocide, Nuclear Weapons, and Food Assistance. The Institute for the Study of Genocide Newsletter, 47, 1-2.
- Leitenberg, M. (2010). Assessing the Threat of Bioterrorism. In Friedman, B. H., Harper, J., & Preble, C. A. (Eds.), Terrorizing ourselves: Why US counterterrorism policy is failing and how to fix it. Cato Institute, 161-183.
- Leitenberg, M. (2009). Bio-Defense Way Ahead Project [Presentation at CISSM, School of Public Policy, University of Maryland, September 16, 2009].
- Leitenberg, M. (2009). Assessing the Threat of Biological Weapons and Bioterrorism: A Public Policy Issue? [Presentation at Cornell University, April 16, 2009]
- Leitenberg, M. (2009). The Self-Fulfilling Prophecy of Bioterrorism, Nonproliferation Review, 16(1), 95-109.
- Leitenberg, M. (2008). False Allegations of U.S. Biological Weapons Use During the Korean War. In Anne L. Clunan, Peter R. Lavoy, and Susan B. Martin, (Eds.), Terrorism, War, or Disease? Unraveling the Use of Biological Weapons. Stanford University Press.
- Leitenberg, M. (2006). A Current Assessment of Biological Weapons [Presentation to the Harvard-Sussex Program, The University of Sussex Brighton, England].
- Milton Leitenberg (2005). Assessing the Biological Weapons and Bioterrorism Threat. U.S. Army War College. ISBN 9781584872214.
- Milton Leitenberg (2003). "Deaths in Wars and Conflicts in the 20th Century". Occasional Papers. Peace Studies Program. ISSN 1075-4857.
- Milton Leitenberg; James Leonard; Richard Spertzel (2003). "Biodefense crossing the line". Politics and the Life Sciences. CiteSeerX 10.1.1.401.2220.
- Milton Leitenberg (2001). "Biological Weapons in the Twentieth Century: A Review and Analysis". Critical Reviews in Microbiology. 27 (4): 267–320. doi:10.1080/20014091096774. PMID 11791799. S2CID 33988479.
- Milton Leitenberg (1999). "Aum Shinrikyo's Efforts to Produce Biological Weapons: A Case Study in the Serial Propagation of Misinformation". Terrorism and Political Violence, 11(4):149-158. doi:10.1080/09546559908427537.
- Leitenberg, M. (1998). New Russian Evidence on the Korean War Biological Warfare Allegations: Background and Analysis, Cold War International History Project Bulletin 11.
- Milton Leitenberg (1998). "The Korean War Biological Warfare Allegations Resolved". Occasional Paper. Center for Pacific Asia Studies at Stockholm University. ISSN 0284-1541.
- Milton Leitenberg (1996). The Participation of Japanese Military Forces in U.N. Peacekeeping Operations. Center for International and Security Studies at Maryland.
- Milton Leitenberg (May 1996). "Biological Weapons Arms Control: Project on rethinking arms control". Prac Paper. Center for International and Security Studies. ISSN 1065-6383.
- Leitenberg, M. (1995), testimony, Senate Government Affairs Committee, Permanent Subcommittee on Investigations, Hearings: Global Proliferation of Weapons of Mass Destruction, 1 November 1995, 104th Congress.(transcript)
- Milton Leitenberg (1987). Soviet Submarine Operations in Swedish Waters, 1980-1986. Praeger. ISBN 9780275928421. ISSN 0278-937X.
- Leitenberg, M. (1984). Studies of Military R&D and Weapons Development, Federation of American Scientists.
- Leitenberg, M., Richard Dean Burns (1984). The Wars in Vietnam, Cambodia and Laos, 1945-1982, A Bibliographic Guide, War Peace Bibliography Series # 18, ABC-CLIO.
- Milton Leitenberg (1983). "The Neutron Bomb and European Arms Control". Political Issues Series, Center for the Study of Armament & Disarmament. 8 (1).
- Milton Leitenberg (1981). Presidential Directive (P.D.) 59: United States Nuclear Weapon Targeting Policy, Journal of Peace Research, 18(4), pp. 309–317.
- Milton Leitenberg; Gabriel Sheffer (1979). Great Power Intervention in the Middle East. Vol. 27. Pergamon Press. ISBN 9780080238678.
- Milton Leitenberg; Richard Dean Burns (1973). The Vietnam Conflict: Its Geographical Dimensions, Political Traumas, & Military Developments. ABC-CLIO Press.
