= Zhang Er =

Chinese-American poet and librettist

- 张耳
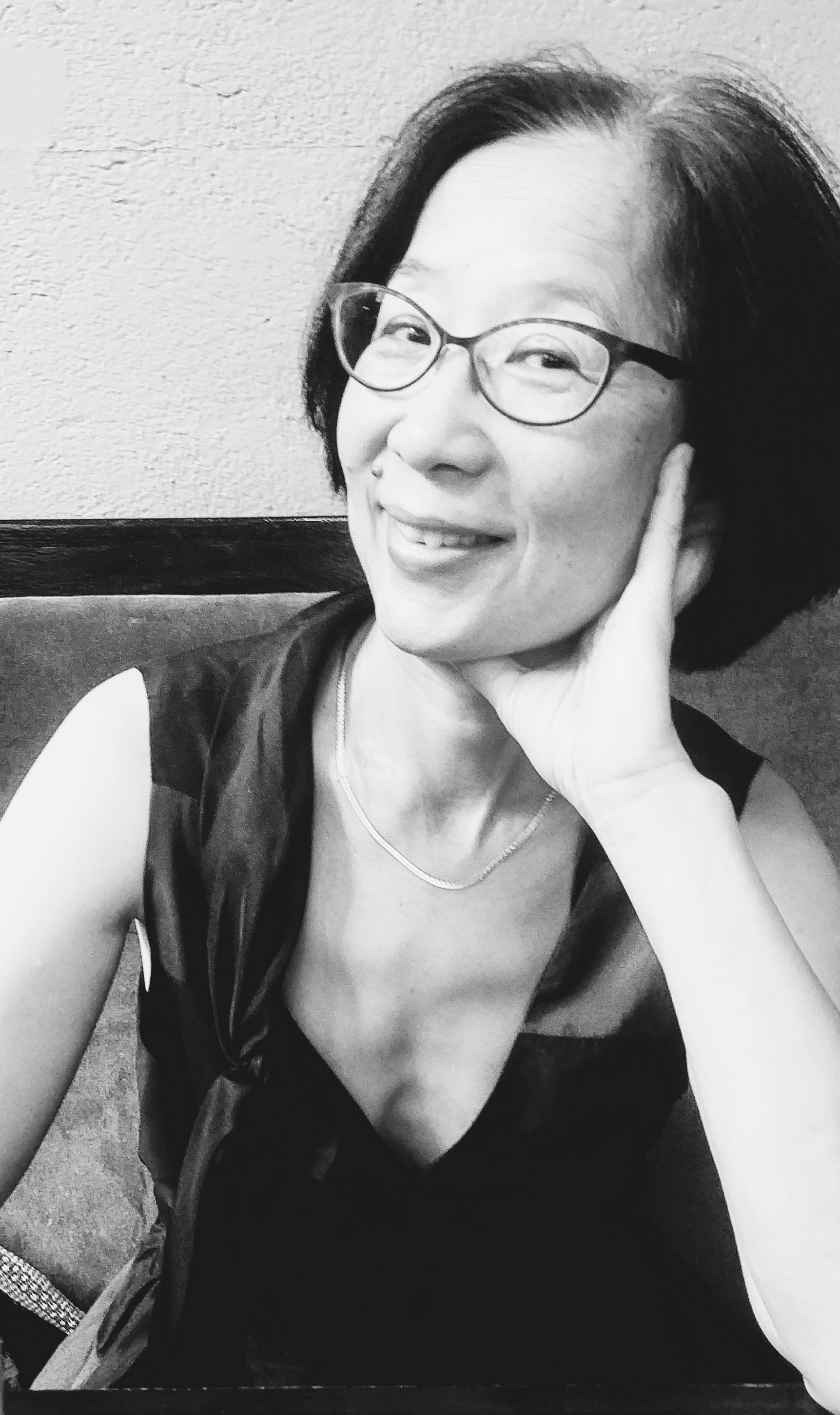
- Born: September 15, 1960 (age 65); Beijing, China
- Known for: Poetry, translations, opera librettos

Zhang Er (Chinese: 张耳, born 1960) is the pen name of Chinese and American poet, translator, and opera librettist Mingxia Li (李明霞). Born in Beijing, China, where she trained as a physician, she has lived in the United States since 1986. She earned a Ph.D. in Molecular Pharmacology in 1992 from the Graduate School of Medical Sciences of Cornell University (now the Weill Cornell Graduate School), while simultaneously immersing herself in the New York poetry scene, where she wrote poetry, hosted bilingual readings, and edited literary journals. She now teaches at The Evergreen State College in Olympia, Washington, and continues to write poetry.

== Reception ==
Zhang Er's work has been published online and in print in China, Taiwan, and the United States. In reference to her 2004 Verses on Bird, Chinese-American poet Bei Dao wrote that "Zhang Er's poems lead us to another world, where we take a bird's-eye view of our world; dive into the blank of writing and shriek in despair. The eloquence in her poems is a voice debating our time." In an article published in Comparative Literature: East and West in 2009, the Chinese poet, translator, scholar and editor Zhang Ziqing described Zhang Er as "a brilliant bilingual translator [who] made a great success [sic] in introducing American and Chinese poetries into each other's country," and added that "her translations of American poets would appear in Poetry in Beijing, a poetry journal similar to Poetry in Chicago. Her poems in Chinese often came out in New World Poetry Bimonthly in Los Angeles, an influential poetry journal distributed in the Chinese speaking areas of the world." Yellow Rabbits Reviews called the poems in her most recent collection of poetry in English, First Mountain, "intensely immediate...collected pauses and spirited moments of grace." Starting in the 2010s, Zhang Er began to write opera librettos. Moon in the Mirror, for which she cowrote the libretto in collaboration with Martine Bellen, has been performed in Flushing, Queens, and at Cleveland State University. Her opera Cai Yan premiered at Pacific Lutheran University in 2016. Zhang Er's opera Tacoma Method, with music by composer Gregory Youtz, takes on the titular city's expulsion of Chinese residents in 1885. It premiered at Tacoma Opera in 2023.

== Selected bibliography ==
=== Poetry in Chinese ===
- 《没人看见你看见的景致》Seen, Unseen (QingHai Publishing House, 1999)
- 《水字》Water Words (New World Poetry Press, 2002)
- 《山缘》, Because of Mountain (Tonsan Publishers, 2005)
- 《黄城根·一溜门》, Yellow Walls: A String of Doors (First Line Press, 2010)
- 《这还不早晨》, Un-Dawn (Showwe, Taiwan, 2015)
- 《离你最近》, Closest to You (Showwe, Taiwan, 2017)
- 《海跳起，子弹婉转》，Sea Jumps, Bullets Twirl (Showwe, Taiwan, 2021)

=== Translations in Chinese ===
- 《平鋪直敘的多樣化》，Selected Poems of John Ashbery (People's Literature Publishing House, 2024)

=== Poetry in English Translation ===
- Verses on Bird (Chinese/English bilingual, Zephyr Press, 2004)
- So Translating Rivers and Cities (Chinese/English bilingual, Zephyr Press, 2007)
- First Mountain (translated with Joseph Donahue, Zephyr Press, 2018)

=== Anthologies ===
- Another Kind of Nation: an Anthology of Contemporary Chinese Poetry (Chinese/English bilingual, co-edited with Chen Dongdong, Talisman House Publishers, 2007)
- The Art of Women in Contemporary China: Both Sides Now (co-edited with Patricia Eichenbaum Karetzky, Cambridge Scholars Publishing, 2020)

=== Opera librettos ===
- Moon in the Mirror, in collaboration with Martine Bellen, music composed by Stephen Dembski, premiered at Flushing Town Hall, NY, September 13, 2015
- Fiery Jade Cai Yan, music composed by Greg Youtz, premiered at Pacific Lutheran University, November 17–20, 2016
- Tacoma Method, opera composed by Gregory Youtz with libretto by Zhang Er, premiered March 31-April 2 at Tacoma Opera

=== Chapbooks ===
- Winter Garden (English translation, Goats and Compasses, 1997)
- Verses on Bird (English translation, Jensen/Daniels, 1999)
- Autumn of Gu Yao (English translation, Spuyten Duyvil, 2000)
- Cross River, Pick Lotus (Chinese/English bilingual; Belladonna Series, 2002)
- Carved Water (English translation, Tinfish Press, 2003)
- Sight Progress (English translation, Pleasure Boat Studio, 2006)
- 《樱桃无肝无心》, Cherry has neither heart nor liver (Chinese, Poetry EMS, 2013)
- The Disappearance of Little Fang Family Lane (English translation, Belladonna Series, 2015)
