= Jack Kroll =

American film critic

- Born: c. 1926; New York City, United States
- Died: June 8, 2000 (aged 73–74); New York University Medical Center
- Education: City College of New York
- Occupations: drama and film critic
- Years active: 1963–2000
- Known for: Newsweek articles
- Notable work: 19 Newsweek cover stories
- Father: Lester Kroll (radio personality)

John Kroll (ca. 1926 – June 8, 2000) was an American drama and film critic. His career at Newsweek spanned 37 years—more than half the publication's existence.

== Biography ==
Kroll was born in Manhattan. His mother was an Earl Carroll showgirl and his father, Lester Kroll, was a radio personality with the radio name "John J. Anthony" ("Mr. Anthony") on the long-running radio program The Goodwill Hour. Lester took this pseudonym from his two sons' given names: John (Jack) and Anthony.

Kroll spent two years in the U.S. Army during the Korean War. He later attended City College of New York, graduating in 1954. He also earned a master's degree in English and comparative literature. A skilled writer adept at several forms of journalism, he joined Newsweek as an associate arts editor in 1963. He ultimately became senior editor in charge of all cultural sections (1964), drama critic (1967), and critic-at-large (1975). Over his career with the magazine (1963–2000), he was responsible for 19 cover stories and over 1,200 articles.

His last cover story was the December 14, 1998, piece on Nicole Kidman's Broadway debut in The Blue Room. He died of colon cancer at New York University Medical Center at age 74.

== Awards ==
- National Magazine Award (1974; for a piece on the arts in America)
- Page One Awards (1974; for a piece on the arts in America; and 1982, for a profile of Richard Pryor)
- George Jean Nathan Award (1980; for dramatic criticism)
- ASCAP / Deems Taylor Award (1981; for coverage of John Lennon’s death)

== Books ==
- Atwan, Robert and Bruce Forer (editors), Bedside Hollywood: Great Scenes from Movie Memoirs, New York: Moyer Bell (1985); foreword by Jack Kroll.
