= Marv Goldberg =

American writer (born 1944)

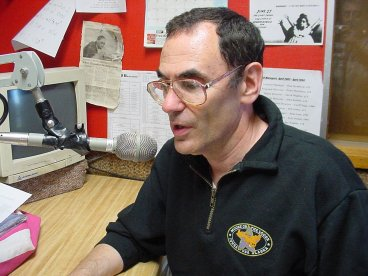
- Goldberg as a disc jockey (pictured, 2004)
- Born: 1944 (age 81–82); Bronx, New York, U.S.
- Occupations: Writer, music historian

Marv Goldberg (born 1944) is an American writer and historian of music in the field of rhythm & blues.

== Biography ==
Goldberg grew up in the Bronx, New York and was a graduate of Stuyvesant High School (1960), City College of New York (Biology; 1964), and Pace College (now Pace University; Accounting; 1967). He wrote his first music article (on the Clovers vocal group) in 1964. This led to his spending over fifty years interviewing singers, researching their careers, and documenting their contributions to American music. In 1972, he teamed up with Mike Redmond to write a series of articles for Record Exchanger magazine. Based on their popularity, he became an editor and publisher (along with Mike Redmond and Marcia Vance) of Yesterday's Memories, a quarterly magazine devoted to R&B. The magazine first appeared in March 1975 and had 12 issues before ceasing publication in December 1977. Since then, he has written for many R&B publications (such as Goldmine, Whiskey, Women and ..., Record Collectors' Monthly, Discoveries, and Blues & Rhythm). His specialization is R&B from the 1940s and 1950s.

In 1997, he created his Yesterday's Memories Rhythm & Blues Party website. On it, he has posted all of the articles he has written, as well as new articles written expressly for the site. In 2009, realizing that his articles reflected many styles, having been written over so many years, he decided to re-write all of them for consistency. He constantly updates them with new information and photographs.

Goldberg is also a disk jockey, and over the years was a guest on many New York area shows. In March 1997, he got his own show, the Yesterday's Memories Rhythm & Blues Party, on WSHR, a 250-watt station (at the time) located at Sachem High School in Lake Ronkonkoma, Long Island, New York. This lasted for 75 weekly shows, until he moved to the Internet on October 25, 1998, with a weekly show having the same name.

Over the years, Goldberg has interviewed most of the biggest names in 1940s and 1950s R&B vocal-group music, in addition to hundreds of lesser-known singers. Marv especially had an appreciation for the well-known New York groups like the Crickets, the Paragons, the Jesters, and the Velours. In 1998, his book More Than Words Can Say: The Ink Spots and Their Music, with an introduction by Peter Grendysa, was published by Scarecrow Press.

More recently, Goldberg has begun to document R&B single artists, such as: Wini Brown, Annisteen Allen, Browley Guy, Chuck Willis, Mabel Scott, Little Esther, Mel Walker, Danny Overbea, and many others who have never been written about in depth.

Goldberg worked as an accountant, a systems analyst, and a technical writer, but his first love was always the music.
