= Gary Gruber =

American writer and theoretical physicist (1940–2019)

Gary R. Gruber (November 19, 1940 – August 27, 2019) was an American theoretical physicist, educator, and author who wrote books and software programs for test preparation. His work focused on test-taking and critical thinking skills. His writings included the Gruber's Complete Guide series as well as books and columns of brain teaser puzzles and other articles. He also worked with schools, school districts, state departments of education and other educational organizations in the development of testing and critical thinking skills and educational motivation programs.

== Personal background ==
He graduated from Brooklyn Technical High School and obtained a bachelor's degree from the City College of New York and a master's degree in physics from Columbia University. He obtained a PhD in physics from Yeshiva University in 1969.

He lived in Mill Valley, California and died on August 27, 2019.
