= Gang He =

Energy Policy Scholar

- Education: Peking University (BS); Columbia University (MA); University of California, Berkeley (PhD)
- Scientific career
- Fields: Energy modeling, Energy policy, Climate policy, Energy transition
- Workplaces: City University of New York
- Thesis: Decarbonizing China's Power Sector: Potential, Prospects and Policy (2015)
- Doctoral advisor: Daniel Kammen
- Website: https://drganghe.github.io

Gang He (Chinese: 何钢; pinyin: Hé Gāng) is an expert on energy and climate policy. He is an associate professor in the Marxe School of Public and International Affairs at Baruch College, City University of New York.

== Education ==
He received his undergraduate degree in geography from Peking University. He was known as one of the few Chinese students who were first selected to attend the UNFCCC CoP11 Youth Summit as a youth delegate. He continued to pursue a Master of Arts at Columbia University in Climate and Society. After graduating, he worked at the Program on Energy and Sustainable Development in Stanford University. In 2010, he moved to the University of California, Berkeley, where he earned Ph.D. degree in Energy and Resources, in 2015.

== Career ==
He's research group focuses on energy and climate policy, energy systems modeling, energy and climate change, and energy transition. He has investigated the drivers of clean power transition and how renewable costs decrease could accelerate the transition. He also studied the just transition away from coal in China. His work examines data-driven methods to study the nexus interactions and impact of clean power transition. He has testified on the impact of clean energy transition in the New York State Senate Hearings On The Climate and Community Leaders Protection Act (signed into law as The Climate Leadership and Community Protection Act (CLCPA)). He has served in the National Offshore Wind R&D Consortium's R&D Advisory Group (RDAG). He has also engaged in the U.S.-China collaboration on energy and climate change led by Asia Society.

=== Professional recognition ===
- 2019 Information Technology and Innovation Foundation Scholar
- 2013 Institute for New Economic Thinking Young Scholar 2013
- 2011 Aspen Environment Forum Scholar 2011
- 2008 Cynthia Helms Fellow, World Resources Institute
- 2007 Asia 21 Young Leaders, Asia Society
- 2005 Youth Delegate to UNFCCC CoP11/MoP1

=== Selected publications ===
- Helveston, John; He, Gang; Davidson, Michael (2022). "Quantifying the cost savings of global solar photovoltaic supply chains". Nature. 612 (7938): 83–87. Bibcode:2022Natur.612...83H. doi:10.1038/s41586-022-05316-6. PMID 36289345. S2CID 253160766.
- He, Gang; Lin, Jiang; Sifuentes, Froylan; Liu, Xu; Abhyankar, Nikit; Phadke, Amol (2020). "Rapid Cost Decrease of Renewables and Storage Accelerates the Decarbonization of China's Power System". Nature Communications. 11 (1): 2486. Bibcode:2020NatCo..11.2486H. doi:10.1038/s41467-020-16184-x. PMC 7237428. PMID 32427820.
- He, Gang; Lin, Jiang; Zhang, Ying; Zhang, Wenhua; Larangeira, Guilherme; Zhang, Chao; Liu, Manzhi; Peng, Wei; Yang, Fuqiang (2020). "Enabling a Rapid and Just Transition Away from Coal in China". One Earth. 3 (2): 187–194. Bibcode:2020OEart...3..187H. doi:10.1016/j.oneear.2020.07.012. PMC 7442150. PMID 34173532. S2CID 221217742.
- He, Gang; Avrin, Anne-Perrine; Nelson, James H.; Johnston, Josiah; Mileva, Ana; Tian, Jianwei; Kammen, Daniel M. (2016). "SWITCH-China: A Systems Approach to Decarbonizing China's Power System". Environmental Science and Technology. 50 (11): 5467–5473. Bibcode:2016EnST...50.5467H. doi:10.1021/acs.est.6b01345. PMID 27157000. S2CID 206558895.

Dr. He's work has been regularly cited in media, including in Nature (journal), Forbes, Scientific American, National Geographic, The Seattle Times, E&E News, InsideClimate News, The Guardian, The New York Times.
