= Mishkin Gallery =

Art museum in New York City

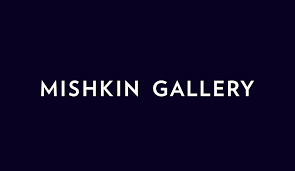
- Former name: Sidney Mishkin Gallery; Baruch College Art Gallery
- Established: 1983
- Location: 135 E 22nd St, New York, NY 10010
- Coordinates: 40°44′20″N 73°59′6″W
- Type: Art Museum
- Website: weissman.baruch.cuny.edu/mishkin-gallery

Mishkin Gallery is a university art museum affiliated with the Weissman School of Arts and Sciences at Baruch College, City University of New York, New York City, United States. The museum was founded in 1983 as the Baruch College Art Gallery and renamed the Mishkin Gallery in 1991, for alumnus Sidney Mishkin (Baruch, '34).As of January 2026, Maika Pollack is the gallery's director. The museum presents historical and contemporary exhibitions emphasizing original scholarship, the understanding of modern and contemporary art, interdisciplinary cultural activity, and innovative artistic practices from around the world. The museum has featured artists such as Franz Kline; Lamin Fofana; Marcel Sternberger; Mercedes Matter; Dorothea and Leo Rabkin; Minerva Cuevas; Juan Downey; Thomas Child; the New Blockheads; Aura Rosenberg; and Jorge Gonzalez Santos.

== Collection ==
The Baruch College Art Collection houses approximately 1,500 artworks, with an emphasis on 20th-century American painters, printmakers, photographers and sculptors, dating from 1924 to 2020. A subdivision of this collection consists of 360 works that are permanently displayed throughout the Baruch College Campus where students are immersed in the artwork firsthand; and there are three student collection websites.

== Education ==
Each exhibition is curated with the educational expansion of Baruch students in mind. The Mishkin Gallery provides student-geared programming such as class/student group tours, panel discussions, and workshops for each exhibition

== Books and publishing ==
The museum produces exhibition publications and books to complement exhibitions. For instance, books such as What is Psychedelic in connection with Aura Rosenberg's joint exhibition with Mishkin Gallery and Pioneer Works.

== Community ==
The Mishkin Gallery defines its community as a group of curious and creative students, artists, scholars, and art lovers, who are open to exploring various art practices, cultures, environmental and social constructs.
