= Baruch College Campus High School =

Public school in New York City

Baruch High School

Location
- 55 East 25th Street; New York City, New York, Manhattan; USA; 40°44′31″N 73°59′09″W

Information
- Type: Public high school
- Motto: Dedicated to providing a challenging interdisciplinary liberal arts education for students in Grades 9-12
- Established: 1997
- Principal: Alicia Perez-Katz
- Faculty: 24 FTEs
- Grades: 9-12
- Enrollment: 452 (as of 2014-15)
- Student to teacher ratio: 18.8:1
- Colors: Blue and White
- Mascot: The Blue Devil
- Affiliation: Baruch College of the City University of New York
- Website: www.bcchsnyc.net
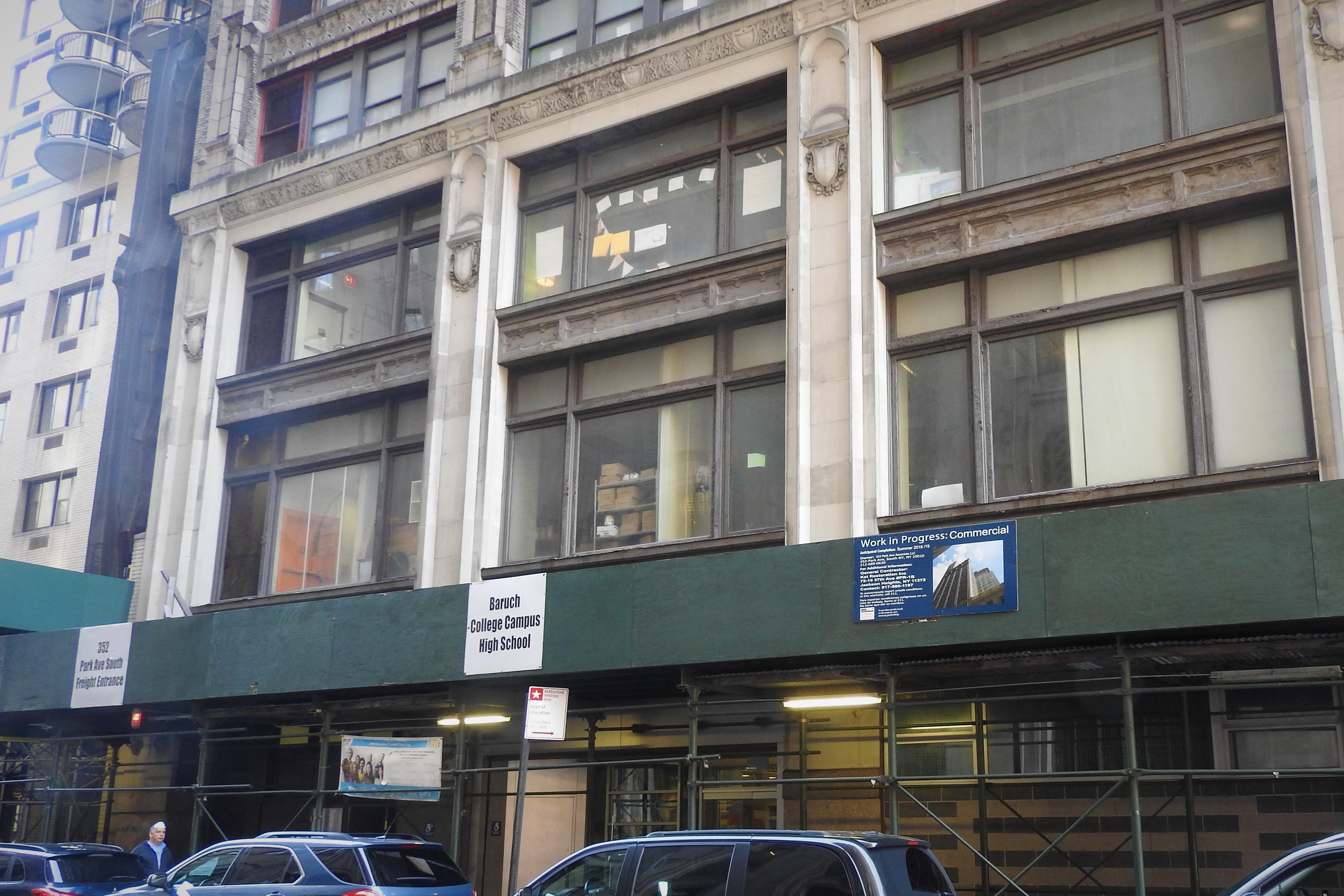

Baruch College Campus High School (BCCHS) is a public high school located in Kips Bay in the borough of Manhattan in New York City. BCCHS is renowned for its high academic standards, advisory program and perfect graduation rate.

As of the 2019–20 school year, the school had an enrollment of 487 students and 24 classroom teachers (on an FTE basis), for a student–teacher ratio of 20:1.

== History ==
Baruch College Campus High School was a vision between Anthony Alvarado, the former superintendent of Community School District 2, and Matthew Goldstein, former president of Baruch College. They wanted to create a small, liberal arts college preparatory high school on a college campus. In 1997, the school was established. Jill Myers was the principal for the first 6 years in the original location of the school on 18th Street. The school was later moved to 17 Lexington Avenue's upper floors. In 2009, the school moved to 55 East 25th Street between Park Avenue and Madison Avenue, which is near Baruch College of the City University of New York.

== Admissions ==
Admission to BCCHS is based on a screening process whereby the school evaluates and ranks all applicants based on their previous school year's final academic record, standardized test scores, attendance and punctuality.

In 2011, 7,770 students applied to BCCHS, which was the highest number of applications received by any non-specialized high school in the city. Only 105 students were admitted as freshmen.

Students applying for admission to Baruch College Campus High School (BCCHS) must have a minimum average of 85 or above in every class (no lower than 85) and a score of two to four on the New York State ELA and Math exams. However, due to the large number of applications the school receives each year, they typically admit students that have a GPA in the mid to high 90s and a score of 3 or 4 on the NYS ELA and math exams. Priority is given to students who reside in Manhattan's District 2 or attend a NYCDOE District 2 Middle School, then to all Manhattan residents or students that attend a NYCDOE Manhattan Middle School and then to students who live in other boroughs of New York City. In 2019, BCCHS started to participate in the New York City Diversity In Admissions (DIA) Pilot Program. As part of the DIA program, priority will be given to District 2 students or District 2 residents who are eligible for Free- or Reduced-Priced Lunch status for 34% of seats.

== Facilities ==
The school currently occupies the first five floors of 55 East 25th Street. Facilities include a gymnasium and a science laboratory. Previously, the school was located at 17 Lexington Avenue on the 10th floor of the old Baruch College building.

Students can use a few of the facilities at Baruch College, such as the Newman Library.

== Academics ==
The required courses are all honors-level courses. Students must earn a grade of 70 or above to pass a course. (Courses set to be implemented in the year of 2017–2018)

*	Denotes Required NYS Regents Exam in June

Grade	Math	History	English	Science	Foreign Language	Physical Education	Arts and Electives
9th Grade	Algebra*, Geometry* (Geometry/algebra hybrid)	Global Studies I	Global Literature	Living Environment/Biology*	Spanish I, Spanish II	Physical Education	Writing Arts
10th Grade	Geometry*, Algebra II/trigonometry*	Global Studies II*	Global Literature II	Earth Science*, Chemistry*, AP Environmental Science	Spanish II, Spanish III*	Physical Education	Studio Art
11th Grade	Algebra II/trigonometry*, Pre-Calculus	United States History*, AP United States History	American Literature*, AP English Literature and Composition	Chemistry*, Physics*, AP Physics	Spanish III*, Spanish IV	Physical Education	Advanced Art, Computer Science
12th Grade	Calculus, AP Calculus AB, College Calculus, AP Statistics	Personal Finance/Economics, Comparative Government, AP Comparative Government and Politics	AP English Language and Composition	AP Biology, AP Physics, Cognitive Science		Physical Education	Advanced Art

Note: All students are required to take the AP exam if enrolled in an AP class.

Students take electives in their junior and senior year. In the past, electives include Psychology, Writing and Film, Math and Space, Computers, Writing, Art and Spontaneity, Drumming, Music, Mythology and Folklore, and Internship.

Students are also offered the opportunity to take selected Baruch College courses free of charge beginning the summer of their junior year. In addition to fulfilling their academic requirements, students are also required to read at least 25 books per year as well as complete 20 hours of community service each academic year.

== Extracurricular activities ==
=== Athletics ===
- Baseball (Boys Varsity)
- Basketball (Boys and Girls Varsity and Boys Jr. Varsity)
- Soccer (Boys and Girls Varsity)
- Softball (Girls Varsity)
- Volleyball (Girls Varsity)
- Wrestling (Boys and Girls Varsity)
- Fencing (Girls Varsity)

==== Sports recognition ====
BCCHS student athletes participate in competitive sports in the Public Schools Athletic League.

- The girls' basketball team has remained one of the most competitive in the city in the A Division. In 2009, the team won a championship title.
- The wrestling team won the PSAL City Championship Tournament in 2010, sending six wrestlers to the finals.

=== Student organizations ===
==== Academic ====
- Math Club
- Debate Club
- Model United Nations
- National Honors Society

==== Environmentalism ====
- Lorax

==== Humanitarianism ====
- Red Cross Club
- United Nations Children's Fund Club
- Baruch Animals Right Klub (BARK)
- Cookies for Kids' Cancer Club
- Key Club

==== Student life ====
- Graduation Committee – This committee plans the ceremony and decides on the types of awards that will be presented at graduation.
- Prom Committee – This committee decides on the prom theme, fundraises, and plans the event.
- Senior Trip Committee – This committee decides where the Senior Class will go on their senior trip. As of now, senior trip is planned by the Student Government.
- Student Government Organization

==== Performing arts ====
- Theater Club
- Film Club

==== Publications ====
- The 411 Press

The 411 Press is the official school newspaper of BCCHS.
It is a monthly newspaper featuring four sections: Baruch News, Editorial, Sports, and Entertainment.
The staff hold meetings every Wednesday throughout the school year.

- Yearbook Committee

==== Social ====
- Chinese Culture Club
- Japanese Exchange
- Denmark Exchange
- India Exchange
- Gay-Straight Alliance
- SQUAD

==== Sports ====
- Running Club
- Badminton Club

== Traditions ==
There are annual pep rallies throughout the year hosted by the student government.

=== Greenkill ===
Every year, the freshman class embarks upon a 3-day trip to Greenkill, New York. The trip is intended to promote social unity among freshmen.

=== Cultural show ===
First organized by the Asian American Club in 2006, the annual show features student performances that celebrate the cultural diversity within the school.

=== Dance competition ===
With dance integrated in the physical education curriculum, every student will eventually learn to square dance, hustle (dance), salsa (dance), and swing (one dance per year). A group of students practice with professional dancers and compete in pairs to win a trophy. As of now, this tradition has been gone.

=== Film festival ===
Films created by students and faculty are shown at the annual festival, which is organized by the Film Club, the oldest club in existence at the school. As of now, this tradition has been gone.

=== Evening in the Arts ===
Organized in 2009, Evening in the Arts is a celebration of the arts happening within the Baruch community. Performances include drumming, music, drama and art displays from Baruch students, particularly from those students enrolled in AP Studio Art (in 2011–2012 school year will be known as Advanced Art). The celebration occurs toward the end of the school year and is held in the school cafeteria. This tradition is no longer applicable.

=== Sports banquet ===
Student athletes, coaches, families, and friends celebrate the accomplishments of Baruch's athletic year. The banquet includes awards to recognize the scholar athletes of the year. The celebrations usually end with a compilation video made by a student, highlighting each team's accomplishments.

=== Field day ===
After skipping few years, field day was reintroduced in 2002 by a former Ms. Jaffe advisory group. The event occurs at the end of each school year when the majority of the student body as well as faculty members attend a social outing in Asphalt Green in New York, NY. For an entire school day, students participate in peer-led activities and represent their advisories in competitive games. These events are hosted by Sophomores who plan out the theme of the day, games to play, and other creative activities that enhance Baruch spirit and teamwork.

=== Advisory trip ===
Each semester, advisories take a variety of trips to get to know one another better. Advisories have taken trips to local parks such as Central Park, as well as restaurants, billiard halls, movie theaters, ice skating rinks, bowling alleys, and even to school to have a party. These trips typically occur on Fridays from 12 pm to 3 pm and days vary between grades.

=== Senior trip ===
Often, the graduating class goes on a senior class trip to Florida. Exceptions include 2005, 2009 and 2013 when the graduating class decided to go skiing in upstate New York, 2011 when the graduating class decided to go to Cape Cod in Provincetown, Massachusetts, and 2013 when they went to Virginia Beach, Virginia. The school has stopped out-of-state and overnight trips. The recent graduates, such as the class of 2019, has gone to Six Flags for their senior trip.
