= George Weissman =

American businessman (1919–2009)

- Born: July 12, 1919; New York City, U.S.
- Died: July 24, 2009 (aged 90); Greenwich, Connecticut, U.S.
- Education: Townsend Harris High School; City College of New York
- Occupation: Businessman
- Spouse: Mildred

George Weissman (July 12, 1919 – July 24, 2009) was an American businessman and former chairman and CEO of Philip Morris (now Altria).

== Biography ==
Weissman was born in the Bronx on July 12, 1919. After graduating from Townsend Harris High School, he studied business at the City College of New York (whose business school became Baruch College), edited a small weekly newspaper in New Jersey and then became a reporter for The Star-Ledger of Newark, New Jersey. The day after the Japanese attack on Pearl Harbor, he enlisted in the United States Navy and, during World War II, served for more than three years as a submarine destroyer commander and on an anti-personnel naval ship. Following military service, he made a career change to public relations, first working at Samuel Goldwyn Productions and later becoming a public relations consultant at Benjamin Sonnenberg, where Philip Morris was a client.

In 1952, Weissman joined Philip Morris as assistant to the president and director of public relations. The next year, he was elected vice-president of the company, handling not only public relations and market research, but also new product development and packaging. He joined the board of directors in 1958 and went on to become chairman of the board and chief executive officer of Philip Morris International, leading its expansion overseas. He was appointed president of the corporation in 1967, vice-chairman in 1973 and chairman and chief executive officer in 1978.

Weissman retired in 1984, but continued to serve the company in various advisory roles. He also joined the board of directors of Gulf+Western, which later became Paramount Communications, a position he held for the next decade.

His marketing inspiration came from William K. Howell, who is credited with the success of Marlboro cigarettes and the Miller Brewing Company. Howell and Weissman introduced the Marlboro Man, an advertising figure who help propel Philip Morris to a leading position in the tobacco industry, which was lampooned in the documentary Death in the West.

Weissman's volunteer pursuits included serving as board chairman of Lincoln Center for the Performing Arts, founding board member of Jazz at Lincoln Center, a trustee of the Whitney Museum, and a director of the New York Chamber of Commerce and Industry. His political work landed him on the master list of Nixon political opponents.

Baruch College's Weissman School of Arts and Sciences is named for him and his wife, Mildred.

He died at age 90 on July 24, 2009, in Greenwich, Connecticut, due to declining health, exacerbated by an accidental fall at his home in Rye, New York.

== Cultural and Philanthropic Involvement ==
Weissman was deeply involved in arts and education philanthropy. He served as chairman of the board of the Lincoln Center for the Performing arts and was a founding member of the Lincoln Center Jazz Festival. He was also a trustee of the Whitney Museum of American Art.

Although Weissman stated in 1954, “Believe me, if any one of us believed that this product we were making and selling was in any way harmful to our customers’ health—and our own as well—we would voluntarily go out of business”, Philip Morris in fact continues to produce hundreds of billions of cigarettes every year, despite ample evidence that cigarettes are indeed harmful to their customers health.
