= Matthew Goldstein =

American academic administrator (born 1941)

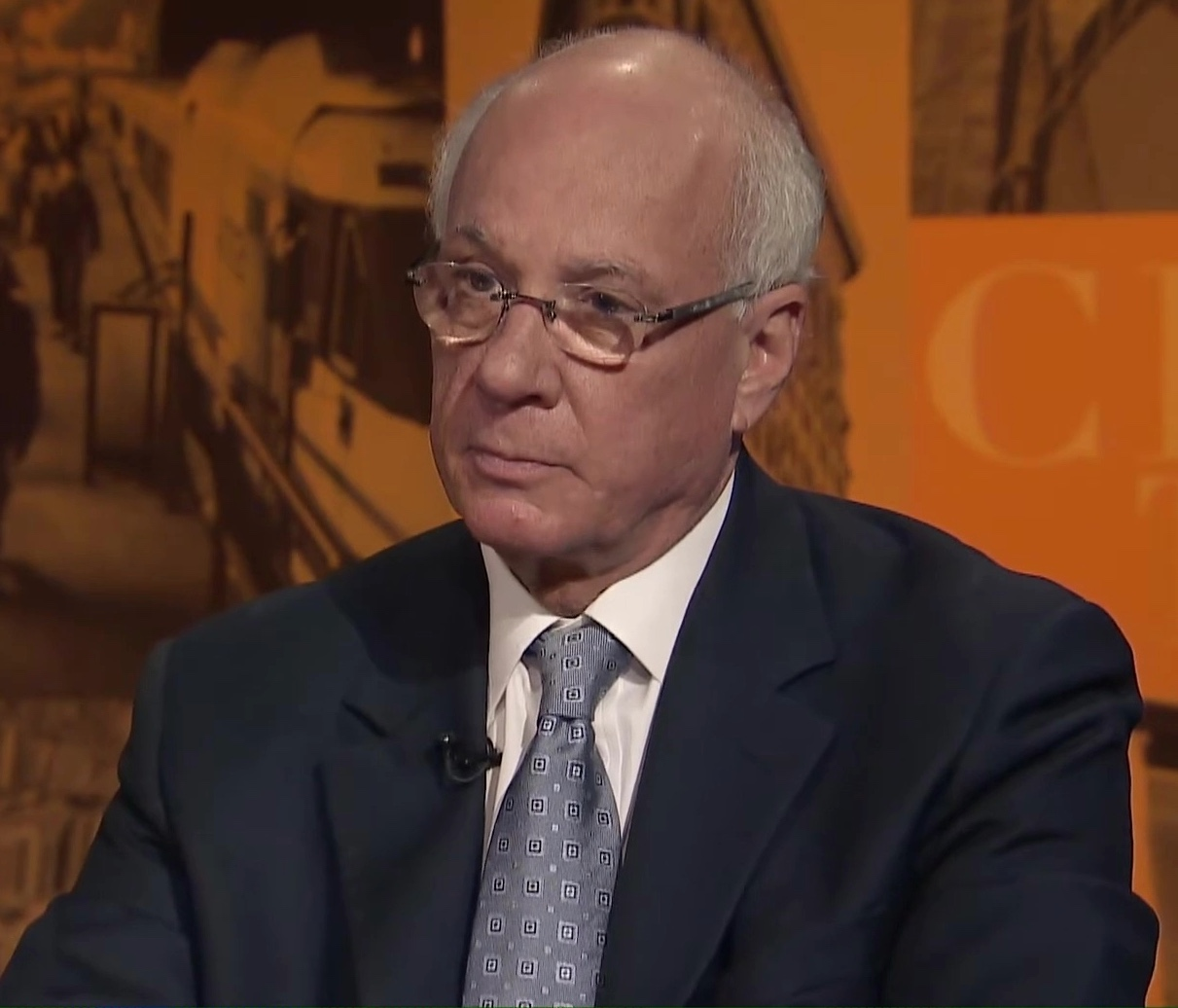
- Goldstein on CUNY TV's City Talk, 2010

6th Chancellor of the City University of New York
- In office September 1, 1999 – July 1, 2013
- Preceded by: W. Ann Reynolds
- Succeeded by: James Milliken

President of Adelphi University
- In office 1998–1999

4th President of Baruch College
- In office 1991–1998
- Preceded by: Joel Segall
- Succeeded by: Edward Regan

Personal details
- Born: November 10, 1941 (age 84)
- Education: City College of New York; University of Connecticut

Matthew Goldstein (born November 10, 1941) is an American educator and academic administrator. He served as president of Baruch College (1991-1998), president of Adelphi University (1998-1999), and chancellor of the City University of New York (CUNY) (1999-2013). He was the first CUNY graduate to head the CUNY system.

== Early life and education ==
Goldstein earned a bachelor's degree in statistics and mathematics from the City College of New York and a doctorate in mathematical statistics from the University of Connecticut. Goldstein is a member of Beta Gamma Sigma and the Golden Key International Honour Society.

== Career ==
Goldstein has been a professor of mathematics and statistics at Baruch College, Cooper Union, and at the University of Connecticut, and has published numerous books and articles. He served as president of Baruch College from 1991 to 1998 and of Adelphi University from 1998 to 1999.

Goldstein was appointed CUNY chancellor on September 1, 1999. He is credited for raising CUNY admissions standards, creating thousands of additional full-time faculty positions, and otherwise reforming a system deemed by a 1999 mayoral task force report to be "an institution adrift." Goldstein led a successful effort to revitalize the CUNY system. During his tenure, he established CUNY School of Public Health at Hunter College, CUNY School of Pharmacy at York College, the William E. Macaulay Honors College, CUNY Graduate School of Journalism, and CUNY School of Professional Studies. He proclaimed "Decade of Science" to create the CUNY Advanced Science Research Center on the City College of New York campus in Manhattan, as well as additional new science facilities on CUNY campus in each the five boroughs of the City of New York. Moreover, distinguished faculty in the STEM fields were recruited and retained from around the world. Under Goldstein's leadership, the State's Teacher Certification exams rose above a 98% pass-rate, and CUNY's first capital fundraising campaign successfully raised over $1.4 billion. On April 12, 2013, Goldstein announced his plans to retire, stepping down on July 1, 2013. He attracted controversy after stepping down for continuing to receive a $490,000 salary whilst on study leave for a year, then acting as Chancellor Emeritus for $300,000 a year.

== Honors and awards ==
Goldstein's honors include the Carnegie Corporation of New York's Academic Leadership Award (2007). He is a fellow of the New York Academy of Sciences and the American Academy of Arts and Sciences (2006).
