= Yoshihiro Tsurumi =

Japanese economist (born 1935)

Yoshihiro Tsurumi (霍見 芳浩, Tsurumi Yoshihiro; born 1935) is a Japanese economist and professor of international business at Baruch College of the City University of New York and serves as President of the Pacific Basin Center Foundation in New York.

Tsurumi, a native of Kumamoto Prefecture, lives in Scarsdale, Westchester County, New York. He holds bachelor's and master's degrees in economics from Keio University in Tokyo, Japan and MBA and DBA degrees from Harvard University, and received CUNY's presidential excellence award for distinguished scholarship in 2002.

== Professional and academic career ==
During his career, Tsurumi has worked as a consultant to governments, the International Monetary Fund and various multinational firms, advising corporations and political entities on economic and corporate responsibility issues, including economic development, industrial policies, business strategies and international transfer of technology. From 1995 to 1997, he helped the World Trade Organization adjudicate U.S.-Japan trade disputes between Fujifilm and Kodak.

Tsurumi's work is largely focused on multinational business strategy and the global competitiveness of a nation's economy. He has written more than 30 books and authored over 90 articles for prominent American and Japanese academic journals, and he is regularly quoted in broadcast and print media such as The New York Times, The Washington Post, Fortune magazine, Newsweek, Forbes, and The Wall Street Journal.

Tsurumi has taught at Keio University, Queen's University in Canada, the Harvard Graduate School of Business, the UCLA Graduate School of Management, and the Columbia Graduate School of Business, and continue to give special lectures and faculty seminars at universities in the United States, Canada, Europe and Asia.

== President Bush ==
Tsurumi taught U.S. President George W. Bush "Economics EAM" (Environmental Analysis for Management), a required two-semester class from the fall of 1973 to the spring of 1974, during Bush's first year as an MBA student at Harvard's business school.

Shortly before the 2004 U.S. presidential election, Tsurumi appeared on various media outlets (such as CNN and Air America) and reported remembering Bush telling him that family friends had helped get him into the Texas Air National Guard. He also criticized Bush's preparedness for class and political views, telling CNN that teachers remember their best and worst students and that 'Bush was in the latter group'.

"Lazy. He didn't come to my class prepared," Tsurumi told CNN. "He did very badly ... Somehow I found him totally devoid of compassion, social responsibility, and good study discipline. What I remember most about him was all the kind of flippant statements that he made inside of classroom as well as outside."

Tsurumi warned Bush: "I remember saying, if you become president of a company some day, may God help your customers and employees."

Tsurumi continued to be a persistent and vocal critic of the President's politics and policies.

== Published works ==
Tsurumi's published works include:

- The Japanese Are Coming (1976)
- Multinational Management (1977 and 1984)
- Sogoshosha (1979 and 1984) (aided the U.S. Congress' enactment the Export Trading Act of 1982)
- Ikareru Amerika (Angry America) (1983)
- Nichibei Masatsu (Japan-U.S. Conflicts) (1988)
- Nihon Saikatsu Ron (Restructuring Japan) (1987)
- Threat of Japan's Neo-Nationalism (1988)
- Global Insights (1989)
- Showdown (1989)
- Global Management (1990)
