= Ted Joyce =

American economist

- Theodore Jay Joyce
- Education: University of Massachusetts (B.A., 1976), CUNY Graduate Center (Ph.D., 1985)
- Known for: Research on abortion in the United States
- Scientific career
- Fields: Health economics
- Institutions: Baruch College
- Thesis: Birth outcome production functions in the U.S.: a structural model (1985)

Theodore Jay Joyce is a professor of economics and finance at Baruch College and also at CUNY Graduate Center He is a research associate at the National Bureau of Economic Research.

== Education ==
Joyce received his B.A. from the University of Massachusetts Amherst in education in 1976 and his Ph.D. in economics from the CUNY Graduate Center in 1985.

== Research ==
Joyce conducts research in the fields of health economics and health policy and has published extensively on the effects of reproductive policies on demographic outcomes. For example, he has published multiple studies on the effects of abortion laws. These include a 2011 perspective piece comparing the effectiveness of supply-side and demand-side laws in reducing rates of abortions performed after 16 weeks which found that the former were much more effective than the latter. He has also published research showing that parental involvement laws were not associated with significant changes in the overall abortion rate, but that they had small effects on some subgroups of minors. In a 2006 study, he and his colleagues found that Texas' parental notification law was associated with a significant decline in the abortion rate among Texas teenagers.

== Awards ==
In 2005, Joyce became the first recipient of the Sidney Lirtzman Award for Excellence in Research, Teaching & Service.
