= Bernard L. Schwartz Communication Institute =

The Bernard L. Schwartz Communication Institute at Baruch College was founded with the support of Bernard L. Schwartz in 1997 and dedicated to helping faculty integrate communication-intensive activities into course curricula. It sponsors an annual “Symposium on Communication and Communication-Intensive Instruction.” The institute operates under the office of the Provost.

The institute is a nationally recognized academic service unit and faculty development program dedicated to infusing the curriculum with oral, written, and computer mediated communication-intensive activities to aid in undergraduates’ development as confident, purposeful and effective communicators. The institute oversees many programs and initiatives at Baruch. These include curricular development and support of Communication-Intensive courses across the curriculum, professional development for Fellows, faculty members and staff, program assessment, educational technology, software development. The institute has published the education weblog cac.ophony.org since 2005 and has developed the VOCAT oral communication assessment instrument since 2007. Baruch received the 2008 TIAA-CREF Institute's Theodore M. Hesburgh Award for innovative professional development programs.

== Directors ==
- Robert J. Myers (founding director) 1997–1998
- George Otte 1998–2000
- Paul Arpia 2000–2003
- Mikhail Gershovich 2003–2013
- Suzanne Epstein (interim) 2013–2014
- Heather Sample 2014–2019
- Meechal Hoffman 2019–present
