= S. David Wu =

Academic administrator

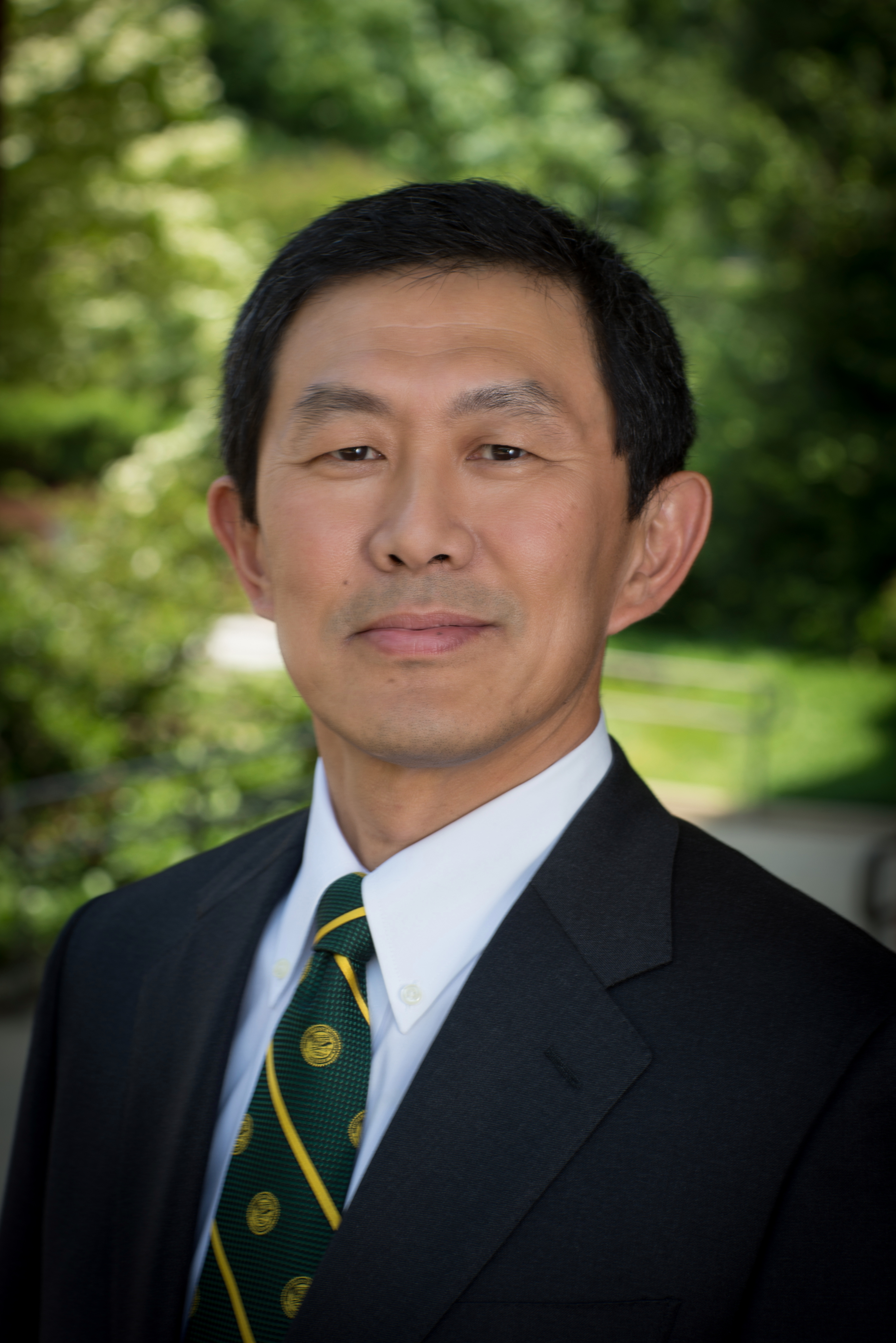
- Wu in 2014

8th President of Baruch College
- Incumbent
- Assumed office July 1, 2020
- Preceded by: Mitchel B. Wallerstein

Provost of George Mason University
- In office July 1, 2014 – June 30, 2020
- Preceded by: Peter Stearns
- Succeeded by: Mark R. Ginsberg

Personal details
- Born: Wu Szu-yung Taipei, Taiwan
- Education: Tunghai University (BS); Pennsylvania State University (MS, PhD)

S. David Wu
- Traditional Chinese: 吳思永
- Simplified Chinese: 吴思永
Transcriptions
Standard Mandarin
- Hanyu Pinyin: Wú Sīyǒng
- Bopomofo: ㄨˊㄙㄩㄥˇ
- Wade–Giles: Wu^{2} Ssu-Yung^{3}

Szu-yung David Wu (Chinese: 吳思永; pinyin: Wú Sīyǒng) is a Taiwanese-American engineer who has been the president of Baruch College since 2020. He was previously the provost of George Mason University from 2014 to 2020.

== Early life and education ==
Wu was born in Taipei, Taiwan, the youngest of four children. His parents were waishengren Chinese intellectuals who moved to Taiwan during the Great Retreat after the Chinese Civil War.

Wu graduated from Tunghai University with a Bachelor of Science in engineering in 1981. After finishing his undergraduate studies, he served in the Republic of China Navy for two years. He then earned an M.S. in 1985 and his Ph.D. in 1987 in systems engineering from Pennsylvania State University.

== Career ==
Wu served as Dean of the Rossin College of Engineering and Applied Science and held the Lee Iacocca endowed chair at Lehigh University, where the S. David Wu Endowed Scholarship was created in his honor in 2014.

Wu has served on both national and international boards including the National Science Foundation and the Science Foundation of Ireland. He is a board member emeritus of the Thayer School of Engineering at Dartmouth College.

Academic offices
Preceded by Mitchel B. Wallerstein	President of Baruch College; 2020–present	Incumbent
