= Carla Robbins =

American journalist

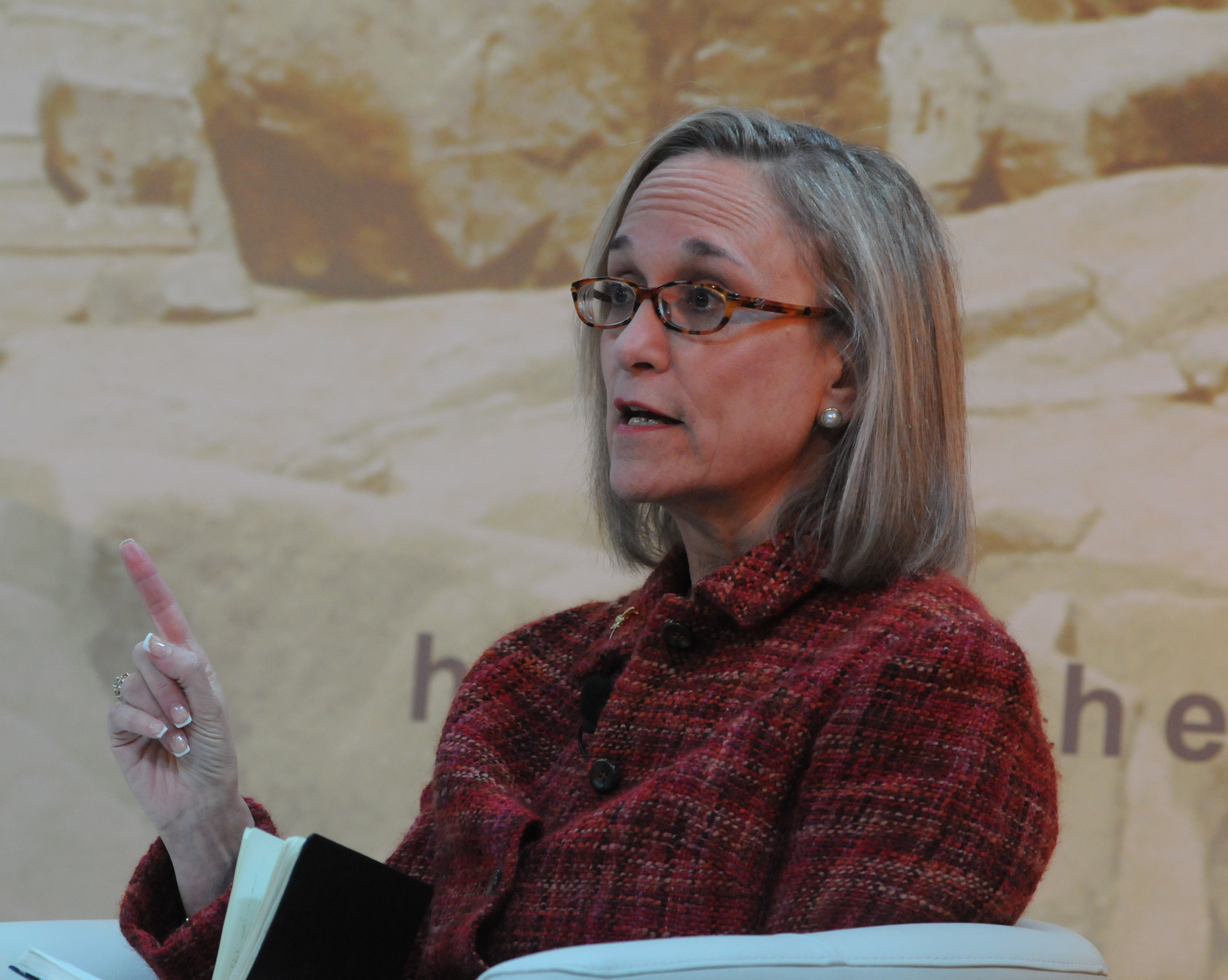
- Robbins at the Halifax International Security Forum 2012
- Born: Carla Anne Robbins; 1953 (age 72–73)
- Education: Wellesley College (BA, 1974); University of California, Berkeley (MA, PhD)
- Occupation: Journalist
- Employer(s): BusinessWeek (1982–1986); U.S. News & World Report (1986–1992); The Wall Street Journal (1993–2006); The New York Times (2006–2012)
- Awards: Pulitzer Prize for International Reporting (1999, shared); Pulitzer Prize for National Reporting (2000, shared)

Carla Anne Robbins is an American journalist, national security expert, and the former deputy editorial page editor of The New York Times. Prior to her career at The New York Times, Robbins worked for BusinessWeek, U.S. News & World Report, and The Wall Street Journal. During her thirteen-year career at The Wall Street Journal, she won multiple awards and was a member of two Pulitzer Prize-winning reporting teams. She is now a senior fellow at the Council on Foreign Relations where she co-hosted the weekly podcast The World Next Week and faculty director of the MIA program at Baruch College's Marxe School of Public and International Affairs.

== Career ==
Robbins graduated from Wellesley College in 1974, with a bachelor's degree in political science. She subsequently attended University of California, Berkeley, receiving master and doctorate degrees in political science.

In 1982, Robbins worked as an editor and, later, as a State Department reporter for BusinessWeek. In 1986, she began working as the Latin America bureau chief for U.S. News & World Report, where she later became a senior diplomatic correspondent. In 1993 she began working as a reporter and news editor at The Wall Street Journal, going on to be their lead writer on foreign policy. In July 2006, she joined the editorial board of The New York Times. In January 2007, she became the deputy editorial page editor. In July 2012, Robbins left The New York Times. She is now the faculty director of the Master of International Affairs program and a Clinical Professor of National Security Studies at the Marxe School of Public and International Affairs Baruch College. She is also a senior fellow at the Council on Foreign Relations.

A foreign policy commentator, she is considered an expert on national security and defense issues, with a particular focus on nonproliferation, Iran and North Korea, American politics and foreign policy, Washington’s budget battles, defense spending, and US military rivalries and interventions.

== Awards ==
In 1984, while working at BusinessWeek, Robbins was one of the recipients of an Overseas Press Club award. In 1990, she received a Nieman Fellowship from Harvard University. In 2004, she shared the Elizabeth Neuffer Award for Print Journalism from the U.N. Correspondents Association and the Peter R. Weitz Senior Prize from the German Marshall Fund . In 2003 and 2005, she was a Hoover Media Fellow at Stanford University.

Robbins has been a member of two teams that have been awarded the Pulitzer Prize. In 1999, she and a team of reporters at The Wall Street Journal won the Pulitzer Prize for International Reporting for their coverage of the 1998 Russian financial crisis. The following year, she was a member of a team who were awarded the Pulitzer Prize for National Reporting for stories examining U.S. defense spending and military decisions following the Cold War.

In 2003, she was awarded the Georgetown University Weintal Prize for Diplomatic Reporting.
