= Mitchel B. Wallerstein =

American educator, philanthropist and official

President of Baruch College
- In office August 2, 2010 – June 30, 2020
- Preceded by: Stan Altman (interim)
- Succeeded by: S. David Wu

Dean of Maxwell School of Citizenship and Public Affairs
- In office July 2003 – 2010
- Preceded by: John L. Palmer
- Succeeded by: James Steinberg

Personal details
- Born: New York City
- Education: MIT; Syracuse University; Dartmouth College

Mitchel B. Wallerstein is an American educator, philanthropist, policy expert, and former official of the federal government of the United States. He is the President emeritus of Baruch College of the City University of New York. From 2003 to 2010, Wallerstein served as dean of the Maxwell School of Citizenship and Public Affairs at Syracuse University, which is the nation's #1 ranked graduate school of public and international affairs. Throughout his career, he has held important roles within the US government, NATO, and in top universities and think-tanks.

== Biography ==
=== Early life ===
Born in New York City, Wallerstein received his undergraduate degree at Dartmouth College in 1971. In 1972, he followed with a Master's degree in public administration from the Maxwell School of Citizenship and Public Affairs. He received a second Master's (1976) and PhD in political science from the Massachusetts Institute of Technology in 1978.

For the next five years, he worked as an assistant professor and program director at MIT. From 1983 to 1993, he worked at the National Research Council, holding progressively more senior positions, eventually being appointed as the deputy executive officer of the National Research Council. Also while at the National Research Council, Wallerstein directed a series of highly acclaimed studies on scientific communication, technology transfer and national security.

=== Tenure in the Defense Department ===
From 1993 to 1998, he was appointed as Deputy Assistant Secretary of Defense for Counterproliferation Policy and served simultaneously as the Senior Defense Representative for Trade Security Policy for the Clinton Administration. While at the Department of Defense, Wallerstein helped to found and co-chaired NATO's Senior Defense Group on Proliferation, and he dealt in particular with nuclear, biological, and chemical weapons proliferation, as well as national security export controls. He received the Secretary of Defense Medal for Outstanding Public Service in January 1997 from Secretary of Defense William Perry, and he was presented with the Bronze Palm to that award in April 1998 by Secretary of Defense William Cohen. During his time in Washington, DC, he also served as an adjunct professor at the Program on Science, Technology and Policy at the George Washington University, the Walsh School of Foreign Service at Georgetown University, and the Paul H. Nitze School of Advanced International Studies at Johns Hopkins University. Wallerstein was named a Distinguished Research Professor at the National Defense University in November 1997.

=== Career afterwards ===
In 1998, Wallerstein joined the John D. and Catherine T. MacArthur Foundation as Vice President of the Program on Global Security and Sustainability. In this capacity, he directed the Foundation's international grant-making in 86 countries around the world. The Program made $85 million in grants each year focused on international peace and security, population and reproductive health, biodiversity and sustainable development, human rights and the impacts of globalization.

In July 2003, Wallerstein was named the 8th dean of the Maxwell School of Citizenship and Public Affairs at Syracuse University. During his tenure, Wallerstein pushed for expanded internationalization of the school's programs and relationships with other elite schools of public affairs around the world; he secured an endowment for the School's Institute of Global Affairs in honor of the late Senator Daniel Patrick Moynihan, who was twice a member of the Maxwell School faculty; he initiated new academic programs in security studies (which included the establishment of the Institute for National Security and Counter-Terrorism), and he supported new programs in public diplomacy, and history and documentary filmmaking. He also raised a significant amount of new endowment funding for new Chairs and other programmatic support for the Maxwell School.

Wallerstein began his tenure as the 7th President of Baruch College of the City University of New York on August 2, 2010. In this capacity, he successfully concluded the Baruch Means Business fundraising campaign, reestablished the endowment of the Weissman School of Arts & Sciences, created the first outdoor public space (a plaza created by closing a city street) in the College's history and also built the first student center. He led an initiative to expand the College's graduate programs, including new Master's degree in International Affairs and in Arts Administration. In 2016, President Wallerstein successfully secured the largest gift ever donated to the College: a $30 million endowment gift to name Baruch's third school as the Austin W. Marxe School of Public and International Affairs.

Wallerstein was elected a member of the Council on Foreign Relations in 1989 and a Fellow of the National Academy of Public Administration (2006) and the American Association for the Advancement of Science (2015). He served from 2021 to 2025 as a Non-resident Senior Fellow on U.S. Foreign Policy at the Chicago Council on Global Affairs.

Dr. Wallerstein has contributed to and/or written or co-written various books, articles, and other publications on national security and public policy, on scientific communication and export controls, and a number of other foreign policy topics. His most recent publication is a book based on his decade of leadership of Baruch College, entitled Public Higher Education That Works: One College's Path to Academic Success and Financial Stability. and he has made many media appearances on CNN, Voice of America, CBC, WGN, Arirang, and more.

Academic offices
Preceded by Stan Altman (interim)	President of Baruch College; 2010–2020	Succeeded by S. David Wu
