= Sigma Alpha Delta =

Junior honor society at Baruch College in New York City

- ΣΑΔ
- Sigma Alpha Delta original logo
- Founded: 1932; 94 years ago City College School of Business and Civic Administration
- Type: Honor
- Affiliation: Independent
- Status: Active
- Emphasis: General scholarship
- Scope: Local
- Motto: "Sum of leaders working for a change"
- Chapters: 1
- Members: 200+ active 1,000+ lifetime
- Headquarters: 55 Lexington Avenue; New York City, New York 10010; United States

Sigma Alpha Delta (ΣΑΔ) is an honor society at Baruch College in New York City, New York. Established in 1932, it is the oldest honor society at the college.

== History ==
Sigma Alpha Honor Society (ΣΑ) was established in 1932 as the first junior honor society at City College School of Business and Civic Administration, now Baruch College.

Sigma Alpha's constitution (quoted taken from the Lexicon of 1959) stated:

The purposes of the society are to develop, coordinate and improve the co-curricular life in the College, to foster closer relationships between faculty and students, and to instill in its members a spirit and idealism which will inspire them to lead their fellow students in working for the enhancement of the college.

Sigma Alpha Delta's mission is to recognize academic excellence and to provide service to the college and its community.

In 1959, the society added the Delta chapter for evening students. Sigma Alpha and the Delta chapter became collectively known as the Sigma Alpha Delta Honor Society.

The society has more than 200 current members and has initiated more than 1,000 members. Its headquarters is located at 55 Lexington Avenue in New York City. It is the oldest honor society at the college. It is not affiliated with a national organization.

== Symbols ==
The Sigma Alpha Delta motto is "Sum of leaders working for a change."

== Memberships ==
Annually, membership in Sigma Alpha Delta is offered to students with at least 30 credits and a GPA of 3.4. New members are initiated each semembers.

== Notable members ==
=== Traditional ===
- Abraham J. Brilofff, former professor of accounting at Baruch College
- Stanley Kaplan, founder of Kaplan, Inc.
- Bert Mitchell, CEO of Mitchell & Titus LLP, the largest minority-held accounting firm in the United States

=== Honorary ===
- Bernard Baruch, financier, statesman, and presidential adviser
- Felix Frankfurter - Associate Justice of the Supreme Court of the United States
- Jonas Edward Salk, developer of the polio vaccine
