= Baruch College =

Public college in New York City, New York

- Seal of Baruch College
- Former names: City College School of Business and Civic Administration (1919–1953); Baruch School of Business (1953–1968)
- Type: Public college
- Established: 1919; 107 years ago (original school); 1968; 58 years ago (independent college)
- Parent institution: City University of New York
- Accreditation: MSCHE
- Endowment: $291.8 million (Baruch College), $3.6 billion (City University of New York)
- President: S. David Wu
- Provost: Linda Essig
- Faculty: 1,221
- Administrative staff: 699
- Students: 19,740
- Undergraduates: 15,774
- Postgraduates: 3,966
- Location: New York City, United States; 40°44′25″N 73°59′00″W
- Campus: 3 acres (1.2 ha); Urban
- Colors: Blue and white
- Nickname: Bearcats
- Sporting affiliations: NCAA Division III – CUNYAC
- Mascot: Bearcats
- Website: baruch.cuny.edu

Baruch College (officially the Bernard M. Baruch College) is a public college in Manhattan, New York, United States. It is a constituent college of the City University of New York system. Named for financier and statesman Bernard M. Baruch, the college operates undergraduate and postgraduate programs through the Zicklin School of Business, the Weissman School of Arts and Sciences, and the Marxe School of Public and International Affairs.

== History ==
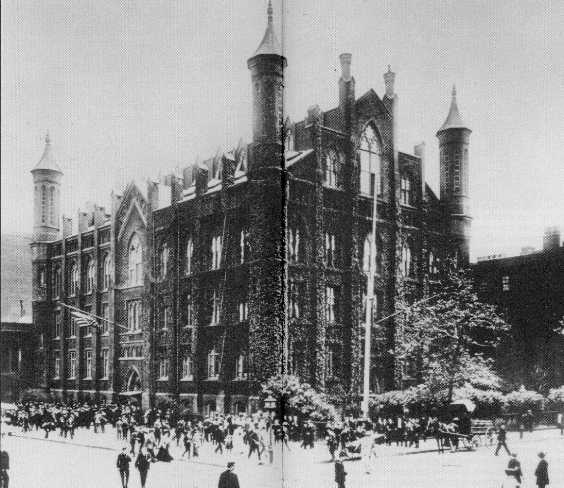
The Free Academy

Baruch College is one of the senior colleges in the CUNY system. Its roots go back to the 1847 founding of the Free Academy, the first institution of free public higher education in the United States. The New York State Literature Fund was created to serve students who could not afford to enroll in New York City's private colleges. The Fund led to the creation of the Committee of the Board of Education of the City of New York, led by Townsend Harris, J.S. Bosworth, and John L. Mason, which brought about the establishment of what would become the Free Academy, on Lexington Avenue in Manhattan.

The Free Academy became the College of the City of New York, now The City College of New York (CCNY). In 1919, what would become Baruch College was established as City College School of Business and Civic Administration. On December 15, 1928, the cornerstone was laid on the new building which would house the newly founded school. At this point, the school did not admit women. At the time it opened it was considered the biggest such school for the teaching of business education in the United States.

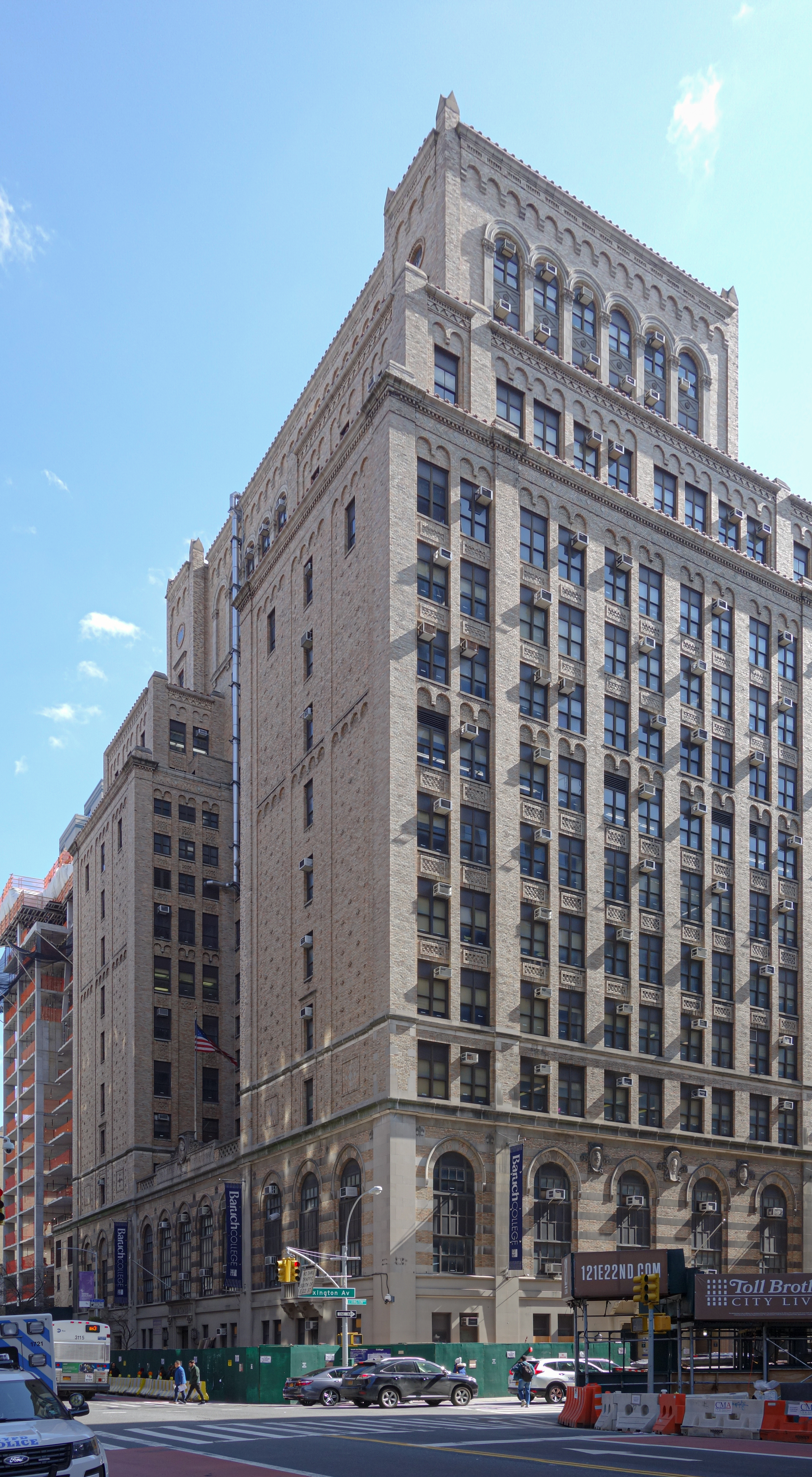
The original building which housed the college on 23rd Street, known as the Lawrence and Eris Field Building, is still in use today.

By the 1930s, women were enrolled in the School of Business. The total enrollment at CCNY reached an all-time high of 40,000 students in 1935, and the School of Business had an enrollment of more than 1,700 students in the day session alone. In 1953, it was renamed the Baruch School of Business in honor of Bernard Baruch, an 1889 graduate of CCNY who went on to become a prominent financier and adviser to two presidents. In 1961, the New York State Education Law established the City University of New York (CUNY) system. In 1968, the Baruch School of Business was spun off as Baruch College, an independent senior college in the CUNY system.

In 1967, Percy Sutton, civil rights activist and Manhattan Borough President, proposed the relocation of Baruch College to a site in Harlem. This relocation would not only attract students of color but to create a space that would foster close interaction and socialization between students of color and their white peers. In a letter to the New York Times, Sutton addresses institutional segregation:

“The absence of opportunity for students of the ghetto to relate to the outside world in which they must one day work and live is a by-product of the nonspecialized and eventually segregated education institution”

The Student Council held the unanimous opinion that Baruch College must be located in lower Manhattan as to not inconvenience students and faculty. According to Chancellor Albert Bowker, Baruch College had a specialized curriculum which required the school to be located in a business district. The Council released a statement concerning Sutton’s recommendation, in which support is expressed to a new college in the Harlem Community; however, it is dependent upon whether the Board of Education views it as a necessity to the City of New York.

The first president of the new college (1969–1970) was the previous Federal Secretary of Housing and Urban Development Robert C. Weaver. In 1971, the college appointed Clyde Wingfield, a noted educator, as its president. He was succeeded by economist Joel Edwin Segall in 1977. Segall recruited several well-known faculty members to the School of Business and established the college's permanent home on Lower Lexington Avenue. Matthew Goldstein was president of the school from 1991 to 1998 (he later went on to serve as the Chancellor of CUNY from 1999 to 2013). He was responsible for raising admissions requirements and creating the School of Public Affairs in 1994. Edward Regan, former comptroller of New York state, served as president from 2000 to 2004. During his tenure, test scores rose, student retention rates increased, and many new faculty members were hired. In 2001, the Vertical Campus opened and Baruch College accepted its first students from the CUNY Honors College, now known as the Macaulay Honors College. The college also implemented a common core curriculum for all undergraduates.

Kathleen Waldron became the president in 2004. Under Waldron, Baruch College received large donations from its alumni, which resulted in the Vertical Campus, 23rd Street building, and Performing Arts complex being renamed in honor of the three largest donors respectively. Alumni giving has increased under "Baruch Means Business," a $150 million capital campaign. In August 2009, Waldron resigned from her position to become a university professor at the Graduate Center. Stan Altman, the former dean of the School of Public Affairs from 1999 to 2005, was named interim president.

On February 22, 2010, Mitchel Wallerstein, dean of the Maxwell School of Citizenship and Public Affairs at Syracuse University, was appointed as the president of the college. He took office on August 2, 2010, and remained until June 30, 2020, after which he became a university professor at CUNY. Under his leadership, Baruch College established degree programs with universities globally, ranked as a top college for social mobility, and achieved the best graduation rate within the CUNY system.

Baruch College was the scene of student protests in 2011 as a result of tuition hikes resulting in arrests. S. David Wu is the president of Baruch College, taking office on July 1, 2020. In October 2025, the nearby 23rd Street subway station was renamed 23rd Street–Baruch College after the college.

=== Presidents of Baruch College ===
	President	Tenure
1.	Robert Weaver	1968–1970
2.	Clyde Wingfield	1971–1976
3.	Joel Segall	1977–1990
	Joyce Brown (interim)	1990–1991
4.	Matthew Goldstein	1991–1998
	Lois S. Cronholm (interim)	1998–1999
	Sidney Lirtzman (interim)	1999–2000
5.	Edward Regan	2000–2004
6.	Kathleen Waldron	2004–2009
	Stan Altman (interim)	2009–2010
7.	Mitchel Wallerstein	2010–2020
8.	S. David Wu	2020–present

== Academics ==
Baruch College is composed of three academic schools, the Zicklin School of Business, the Weissman School of Arts and Sciences, and the Marxe School of Public and International Affairs.

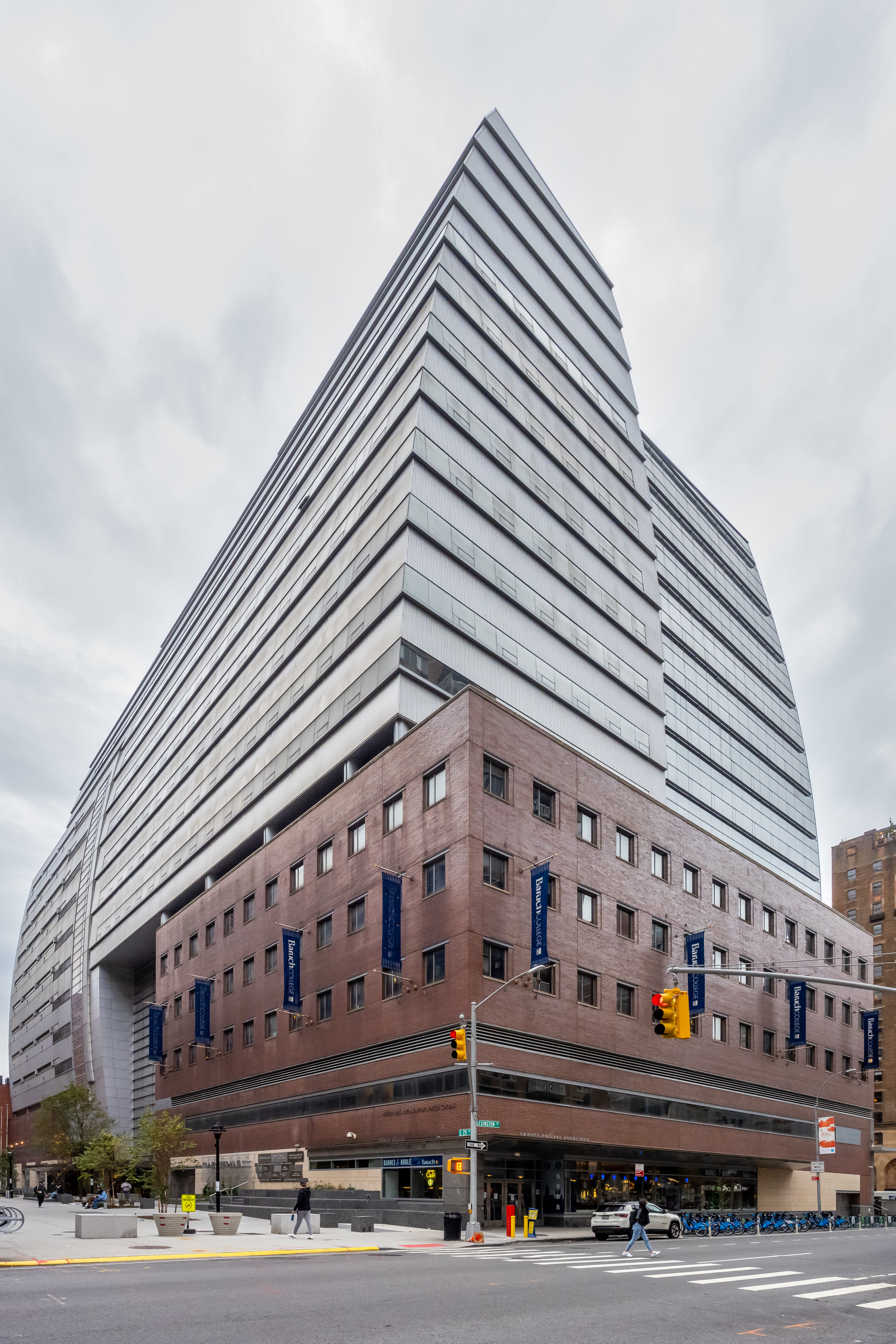
The Newman Vertical Campus is home to the Zicklin School of Business and Weissman School of Arts and Sciences.

The Zicklin School of Business grants a Bachelor of Business Administration (BBA) degree in 19 different business-related areas, a Masters of Business Administration (MBA) in 14 business-related areas, and a Masters of Science (MS) in 8 business-related programs.

The Weissman School of Arts and Sciences grants a Bachelor of Arts (BA) degree in over 27 different arts and science-related areas, a Masters of Arts (MA) in Corporate Communications and Mental Health Counseling, and a Masters of Science (MS) in Financial Engineering and Industrial-Organizational Psychology.

The Austin W. Marxe School of Public and International Affairs grants an in-person and online Bachelor of Science (BS) degree in Public Affairs, a Masters of Public Administration (MPA) in 5 different public affairs-related areas, an online MPA, a Masters of International Affairs (MIA), a Masters of Science in City Planning (MSCP), a Masters in Public Policy (MPP), and both a Masters of Science in Education (MSEd) and an online Doctorate in Education (EdD) in Higher Education Administration.

The college also houses several doctoral (PhD) programs offered through the CUNY Graduate Center. They include Business (with specializations in Accounting, Finance, Information Systems, Marketing, Organizational Behavior, or Operations and Decision Analytics) as well as Industrial and Organizational Psychology. As of June 2013, the CUNY PhD in Business degree is offered jointly by the Graduate Center and Baruch College.

== Campus ==
=== Lawrence and Eris Field Building ===
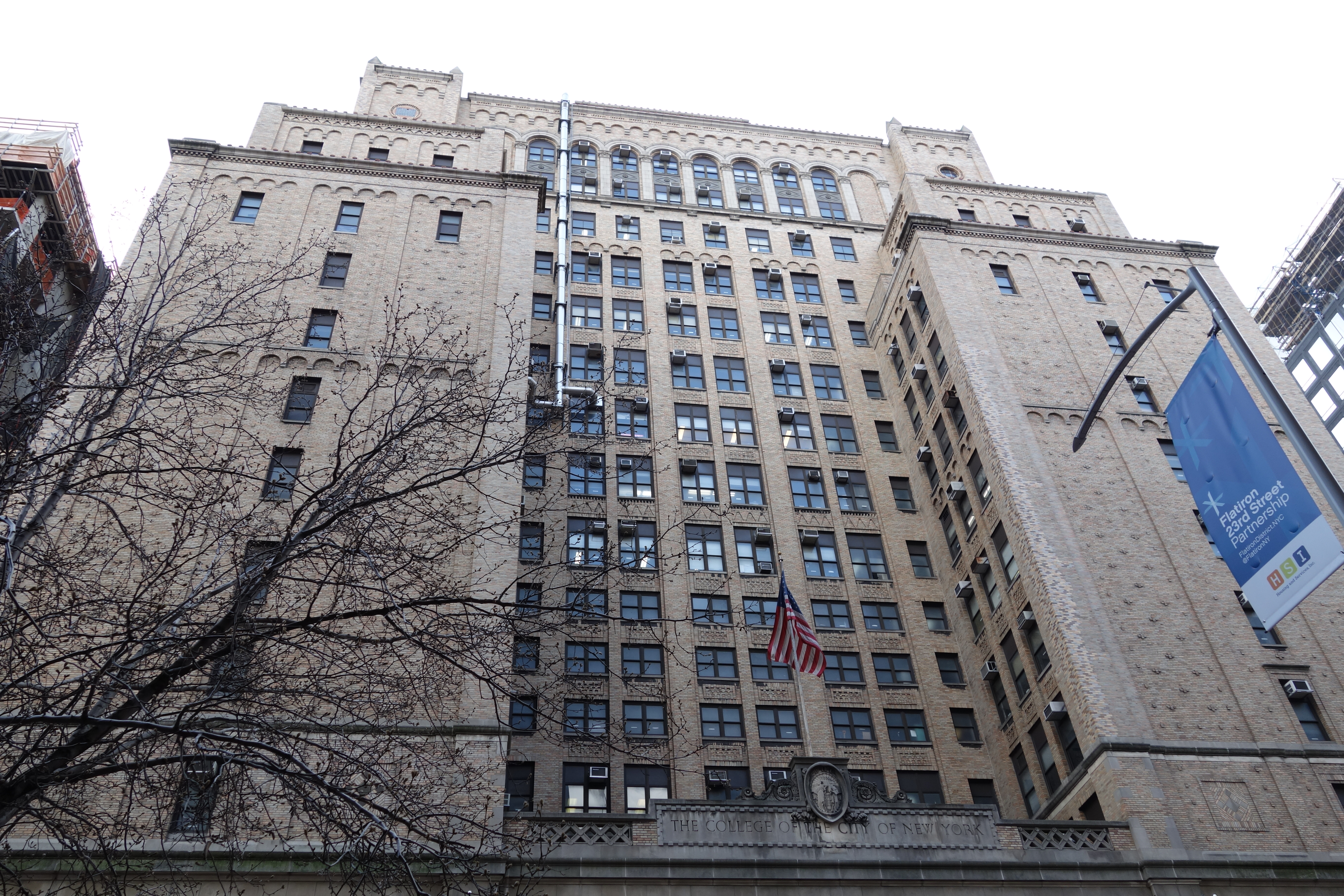
The Lawrence and Eris Field Building

The Lawrence and Eris Field Building, also known as the 23rd Street Building, is still in use by the college today. The 23rd Street Building began renovation in 2013. The ten-year renovation project will finally bring the 23rd Street Building to twenty-first-century standards. The building is home to the Marxe School of Public and International Affairs and several administrative offices.

=== Information and Technology Building ===
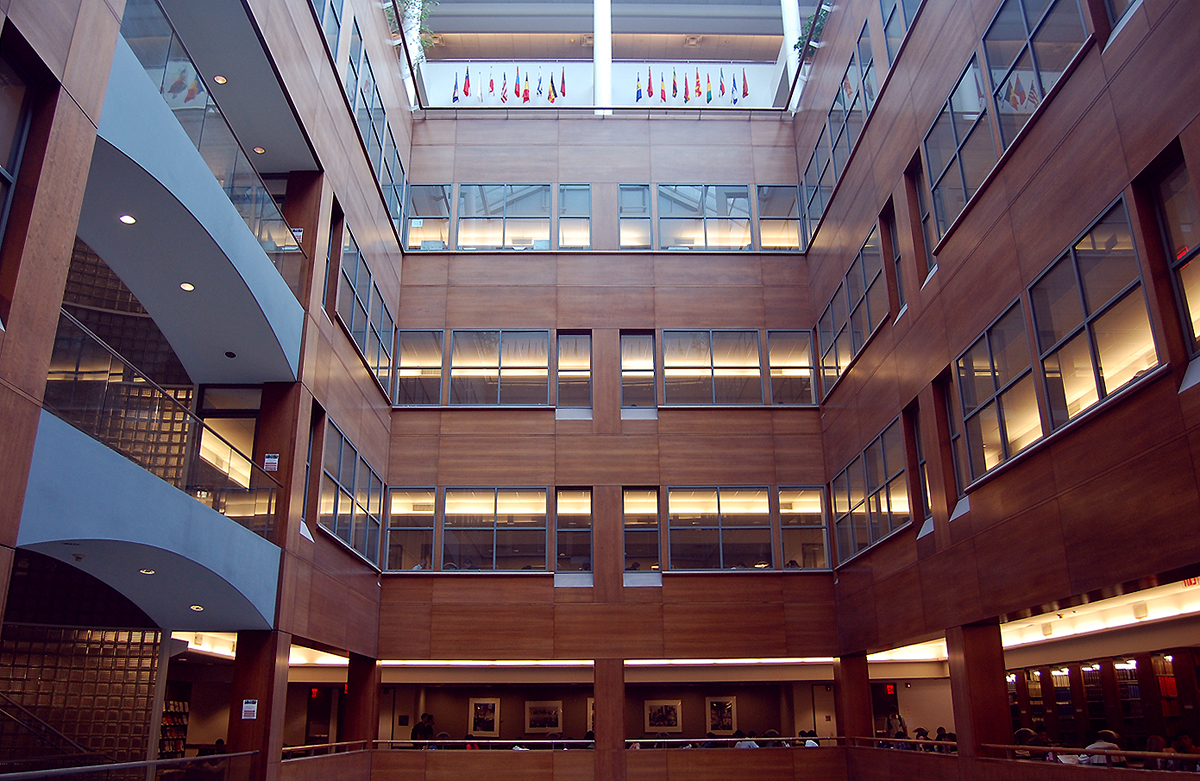
The Information and Technology Building is home to the William and Anita Newman Library.

The Information and Technology Building is located across East 25th Street from the Newman Vertical Campus. The structure, which was once a substation for New York City streetcars, it is home to the William and Anita Newman Library. A computer lab, the Baruch Computing and Technology Center, is on the sixth floor. The building also contains the offices of the Registrar, Undergraduate Admissions, Financial Aid and the International Student Center. It is colloquially known as the "Library Building" by students and staff.

=== Newman Vertical Campus ===
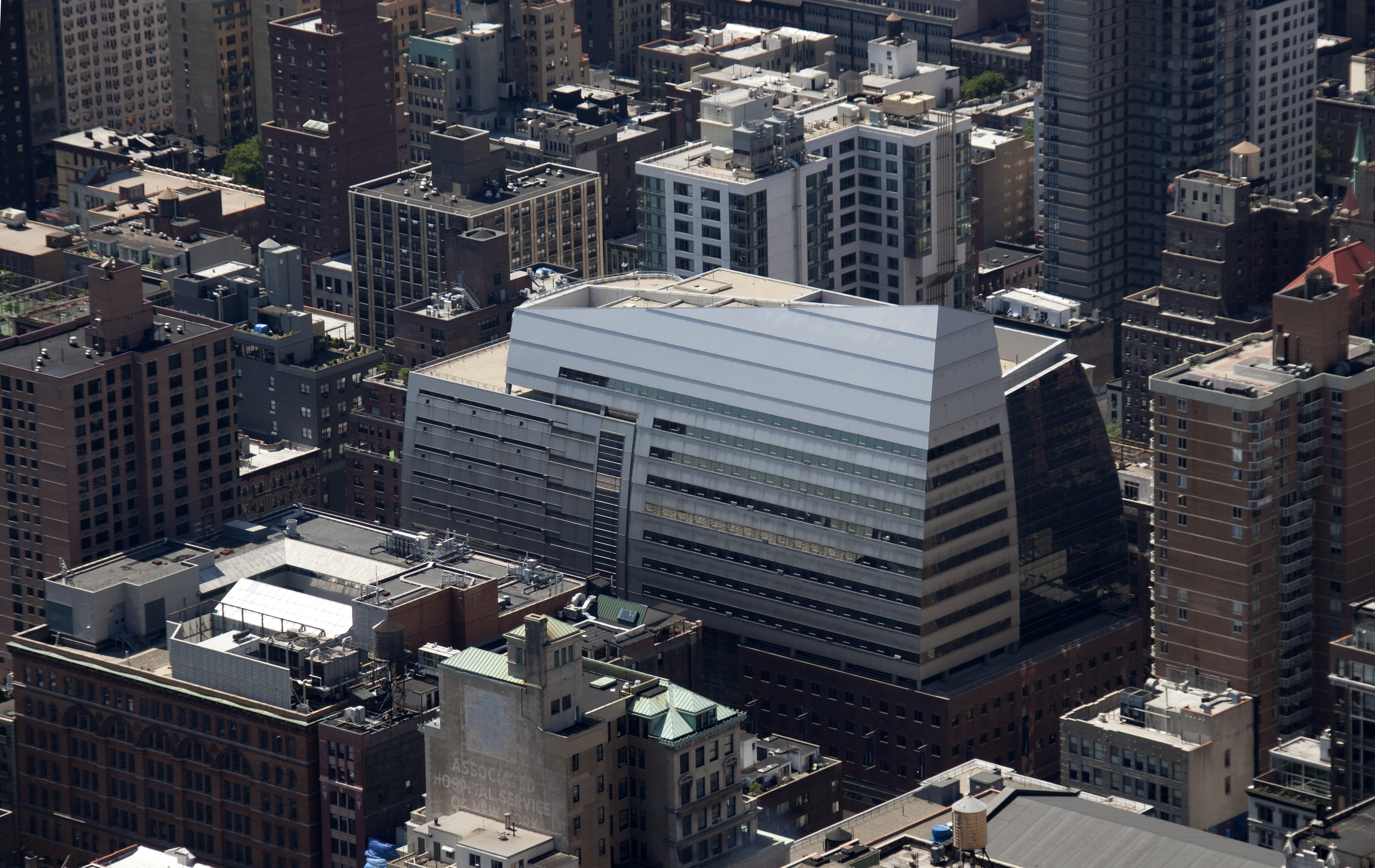
Newman Vertical Campus

After decades of renting space for classrooms, the college began constructing what is now the Newman Vertical Campus in 1998; the 17-story building was designed by Kohn Pedersen Fox. Named after businessman William Newman and inaugurated on August 27, 2001, the building is a 786,000-square-foot (73,000 m^{2}), 17-floor building, which cost $327 million to erect. It is now home to the Zicklin School of Business and the Weissman School of Arts and Sciences (the Marxe School of Public and International Affairs is housed in the Field Building). It houses classrooms, faculty offices, additional computer labs for student use, along with the Athletic and Recreation Complex (ARC), Cafeteria, and Baruch Bookstore. The Newman Vertical Campus received the American Institute of Architects' highest award for an individual building in 2003. East 25th Street between Lexington and Third Avenue was renamed "Bernard Baruch Way", and the college now uses the Vertical Campus as its official address.

=== Campus location ===
The college is located between East 22nd and 25th Streets in Manhattan, along Lexington Avenue, near Madison Square Park. The campus is served by the following transportation:

- New York City Subway: the 23rd Street–Baruch College and 28th Street subway stations at Park Avenue, served by the 6 and <6> trains.
- New York City Bus: M1, M2, M3, M9, M15, M15 SBS, M23 SBS, M34A SBS, M101, M102 and M103 routes.

== Academic centers and institutes ==
- Baruch College Survey Research
- CCI – Corporate Communication International
- CUNY Institute for Demographic Research
- Center for Educational Leadership
- Center on Equality, Pluralism and Policy
- Lawrence N. Field Center for Entrepreneurship
- Jewish Studies Center
- Steven L. Newman Real Estate Institute
- New York Census Research Data Center
- Center for Nonprofit Strategy and Management
- Center for the Study of Business and Government (CSBG)
- The Bernard L. Schwartz Communication Institute at Baruch College is an academic service unit and faculty development program. It supports educational technology and communications instructional projects in the college.
- The Starr Career Development Center, named after the Starr Foundation, provides career services to all Baruch College undergraduates and alumni with bachelor's degrees from Baruch.
- The Subotnick Financial Services Center, which opened in 2000, provides a simulation of practical trading experience. Its centerpiece is the Bert W. and Sandra Wasserman Trading Floor.
- Center for Teaching and Learning
- Computer Center for Visually Impaired People
- Weissman Center for International Business
- Robert Zicklin Center for Corporate Integrity

== Partnerships ==
- The Zicklin School of Business:
  - has established a corporate-university partnership with JPMorgan Chase.
  - maintains a joint JD/MBA program with Brooklyn Law School and New York Law School.
- Baruch College Campus High School is a public high school operated by the New York City Department of Education that is affiliated with the college.
- The Executive Master of Science in finance, and Executive Master of Science in marketing programs at the American Graduate School in Paris are affiliated with Baruch College.

== Student life ==
Undergraduate demographics as of Fall 2023
Race and ethnicity	Total
Asian	36%
Hispanic	28%
White	17%
Black	9%
International student	7%
Two or more races	3%
Economic diversity
Low-income (Note: The percentage of students who received an income-based federal Pell grant intended for low-income students.)	55%
Affluent (Note: The percentage of students who are a part of the American middle class at the bare minimum.)	45%

WBMB Baruch College Radio currently provides around the clock radio broadcasts via their website stream and local FM frequency 94.3. The Ticker has been the student newspaper since 1932. The school is home to over 130 clubs and student organizations, including large chapters of such national and international organizations as Finance and Economics Society, ISACA Cybersecurity Club, ALPFA, AIESEC, Toastmasters, Alpha Kappa Psi, Sigma Alpha Delta, Muslim Student Association, Bangladesh Student Association, United Chinese Language Association, InterVarsity Christian Fellowship, and Golden Key. Most undergraduate clubs meet on Thursdays between 12:40 p.m. to 2:20 p.m., which is known as "Club Hours." Baruch college also has an art gallery on campus (Mishkin Gallery) that showcases various exhibitions that engage and educate the students.

== Athletics ==
Baruch College competes in Division III of the National Collegiate Athletic Association. The sports teams, referred to as the Bearcats (with Binturong being the actual name of these animals from many parts of Asia) are a member of the City University of New York Athletic Conference (CUNYAC). Men's sports include baseball, basketball, cross country, soccer, swimming & diving, tennis and volleyball. Women's sports include basketball, cross country, softball, swimming & diving, tennis and volleyball.

== Admissions ==
The undergraduate admissions for Baruch College are considered to be "Selective" by the College Board with a 43% acceptance rate. Baruch College follows a holistic admissions process by considering teacher recommendations, application essay, and extracurricular activities, in addition to standardized test scores and GPA. For 2022, the average admitted student's GPA was 3.7, with an SAT score range of 1170–1350 and average ACT score of 27. The college has a 70% graduation rate within six years.

== Rankings ==
Academic rankings

Regional
- U.S. News & World Report: 9

National
- Forbes: 74
- WSJ/College Pulse: 47

Baruch College has been ranked by multiple sources, including:

- In its annual "Social Mobility Index" for 2015, CollegeNet ranked Baruch #1 in the country, among more than 900 schools considered, in providing social mobility for students.
- Washington Monthly ranked Baruch #1 in the Northeast in 2015 in providing "Best Bang for the Buck."
- CNBC Says Baruch College is #2 Best Public Institution Nationwide for Return on Investment in 2020.
- Entrepreneur magazine and The Princeton Review ranked Baruch #5 in 2018 among colleges for its undergraduate entrepreneurship program, and #10 for the graduate school.
- Forbes ranked Baruch #9 in the country among "Best Value Schools" for 2019. The magazine also ranked Baruch #55 nationally among "Best Business Schools."
- In 2015, Business Insider recognized Baruch as #19 in its ranking of the 25 business schools that offer the best value.
- U.S. News & World Report ranked Baruch 20th in 2017 among Regional Universities in the North. The magazine also ranked Baruch #4, Most Ethnically Diverse (in the North Region); #5, Top Public Schools (in the North Region); #1, Least Debt (in the North Region); #15, City Management and Urban Policy; #29, Health Care Management; #35, Accounting; #45, Top Public Affairs Schools; #61, Best Undergraduate Business programs; #66, Best Part-time MBA.
- U.S. News & World Report, in its 2023 ranking of "Best Business Schools," listed Zicklin as #49 nationally.

== Notable alumni ==
Before 1968, alumni of Baruch College were officially alumni of the City College of New York.

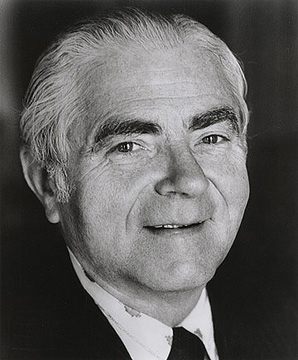
Abraham Beame ('28), 104th Mayor of New York City

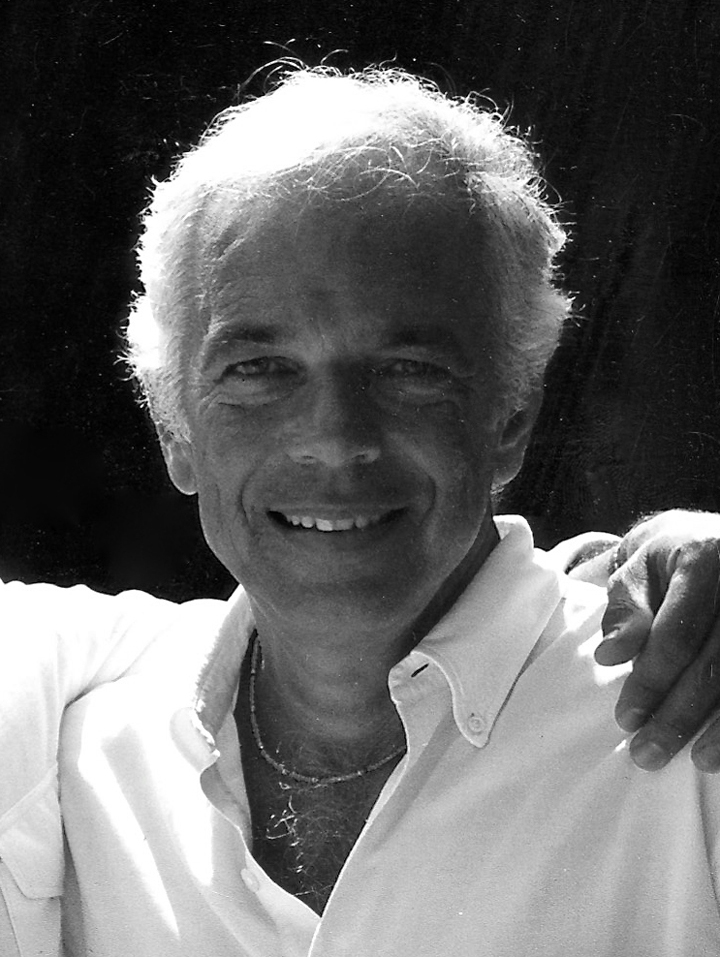
Ralph Lauren (1957–1959), Chairman of Ralph Lauren Corporation

Neil Reshen ('60), talent manager, lawyer, and accountant

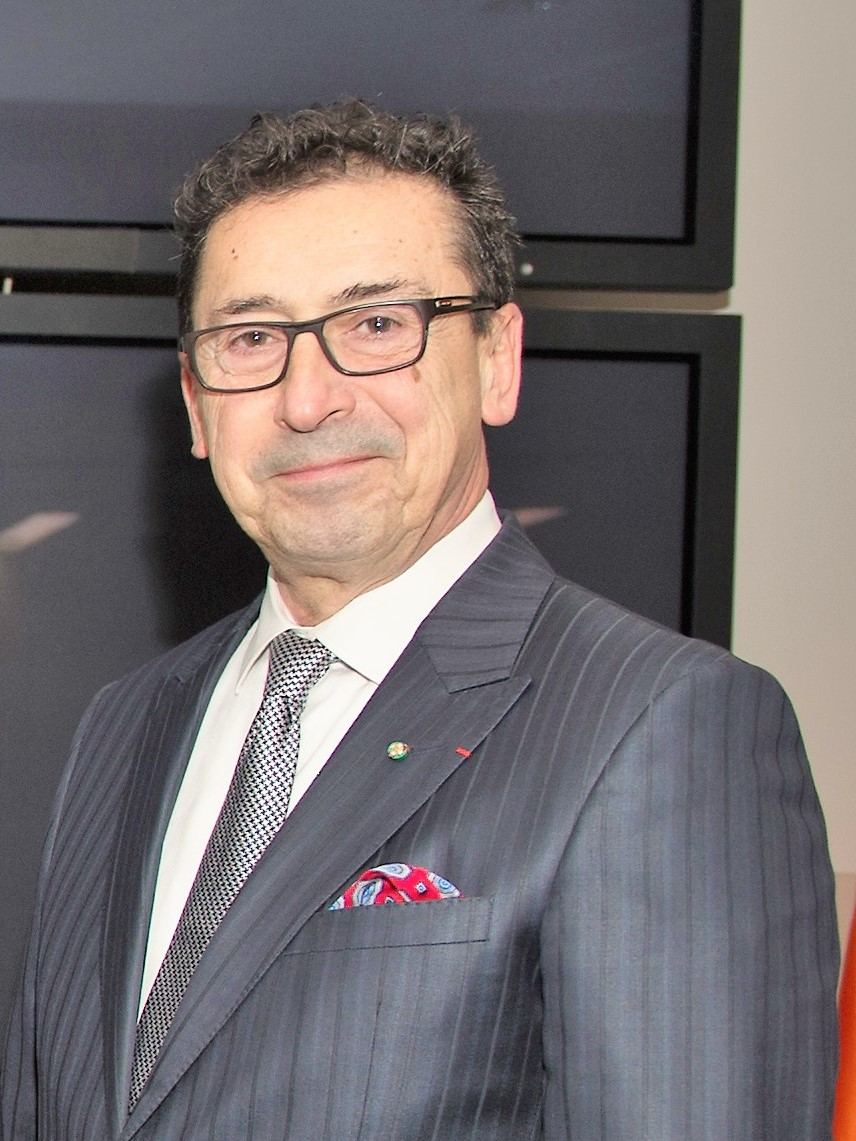
Daniel A. Nigro ('71), 33rd New York City Fire Commissioner

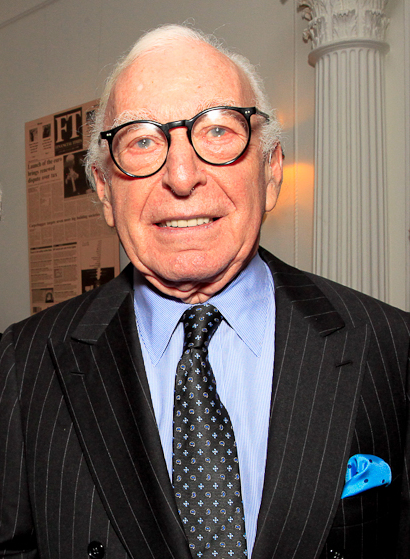
Carl Spielvogel ('75), former United States Ambassador to Slovakia

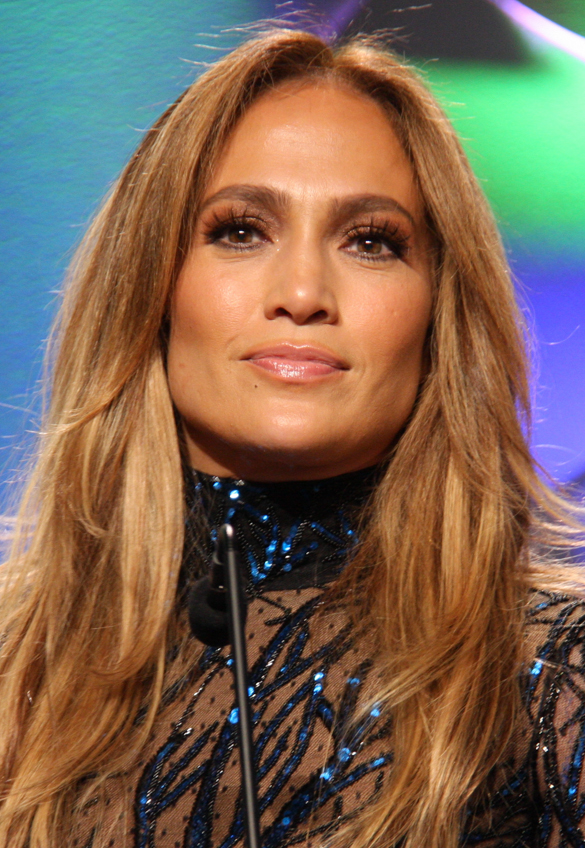
Jennifer Lopez (1987–1987) American actress and singer

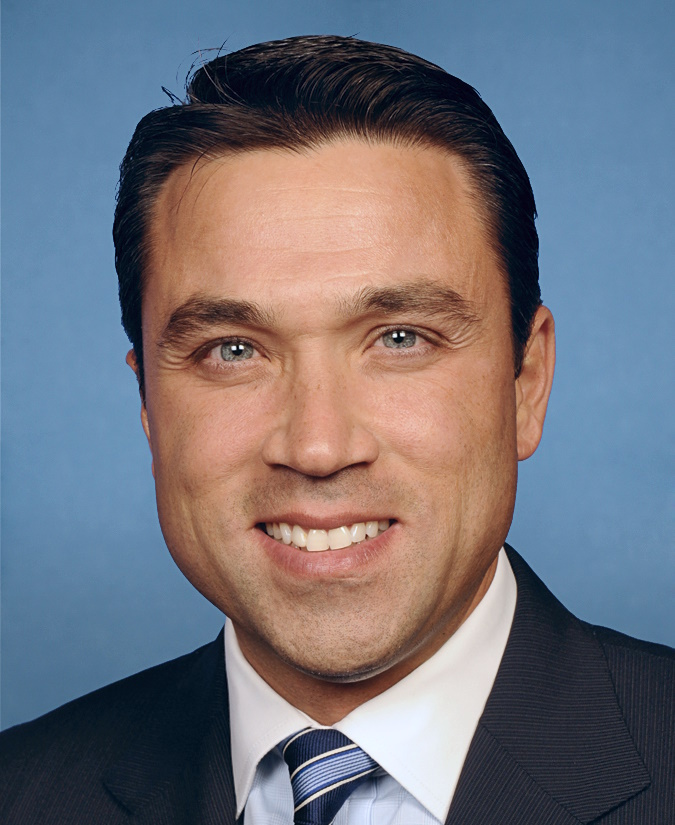
Michael Grimm ('94), former member of the United States House of Representatives

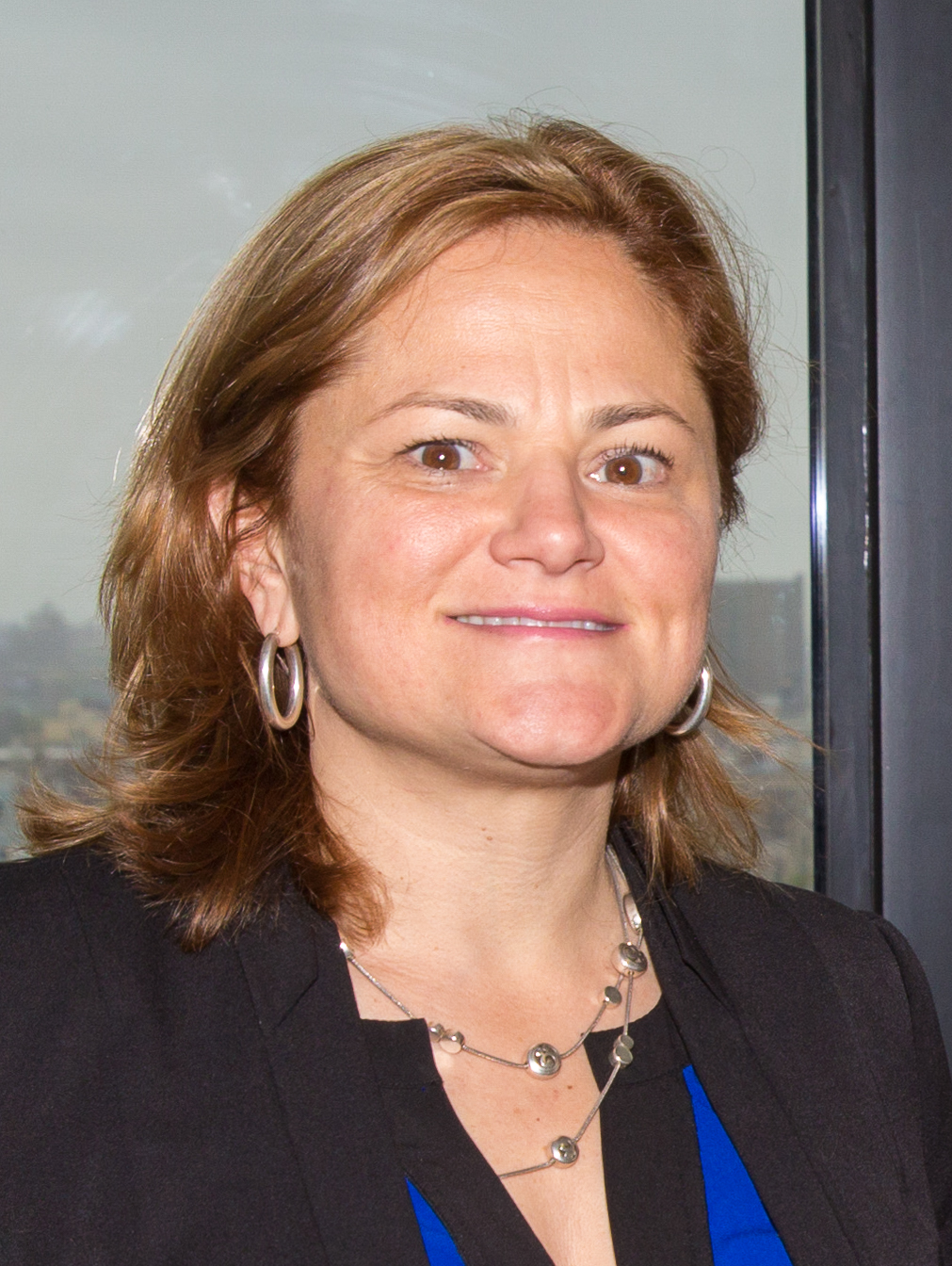
Melissa Mark-Viverito ('95), former Speaker of the New York City Council

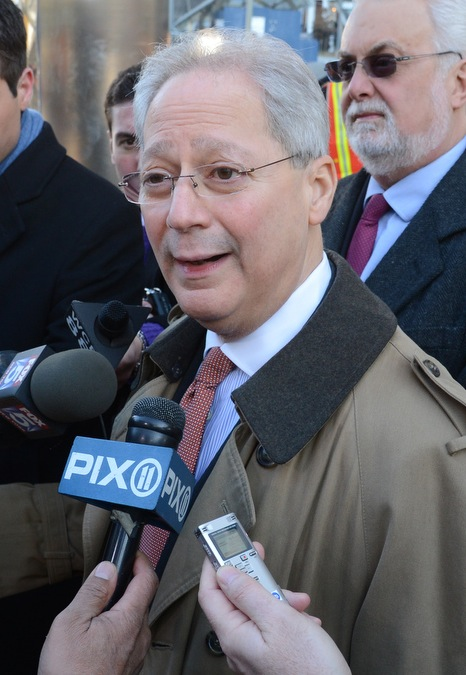
Fernando Ferrer ('04), former chairman of Metropolitan Transportation Authority

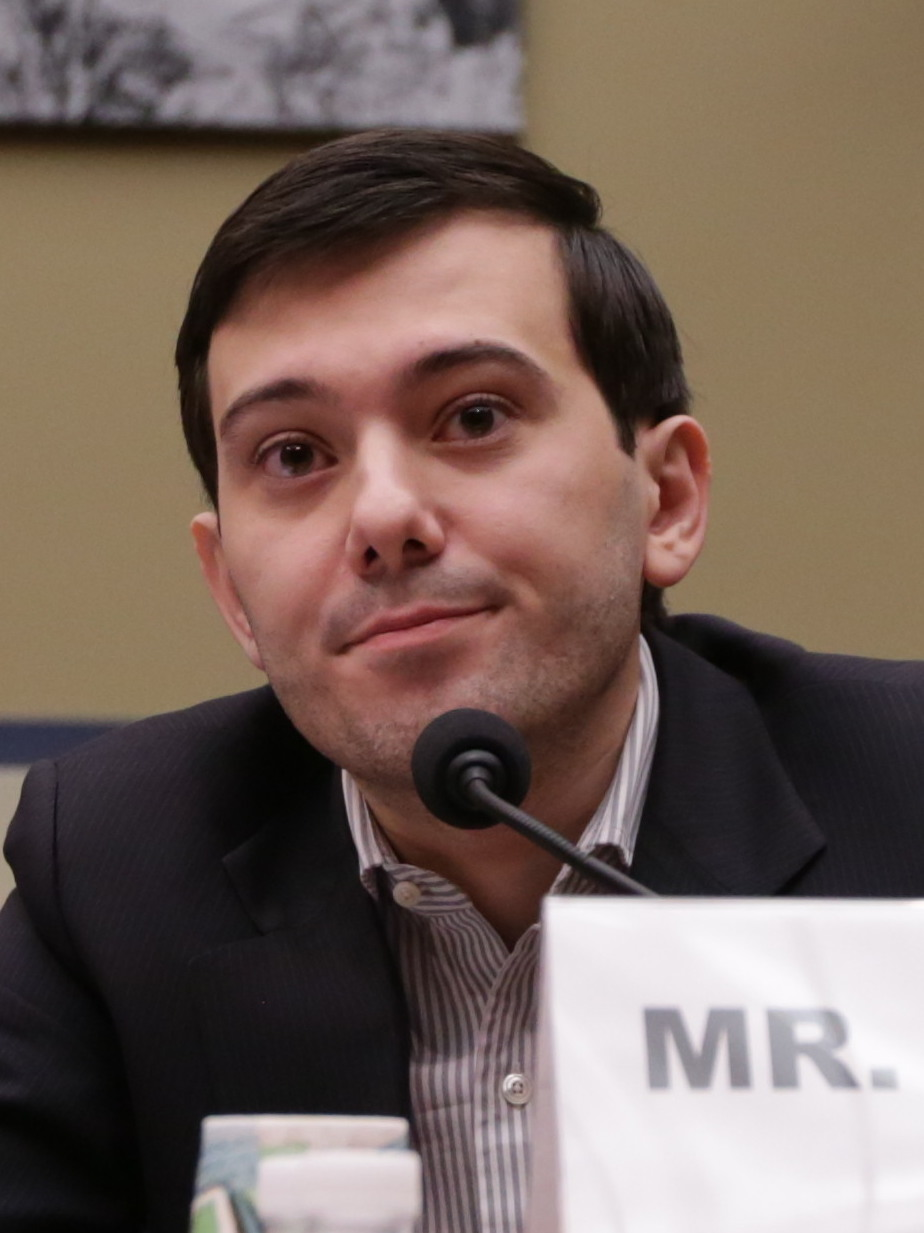
Martin Shkreli ('04), founder of Turing Pharmaceuticals

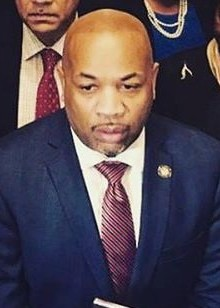
Carl Heastie ('07), Speaker of the New York State Assembly

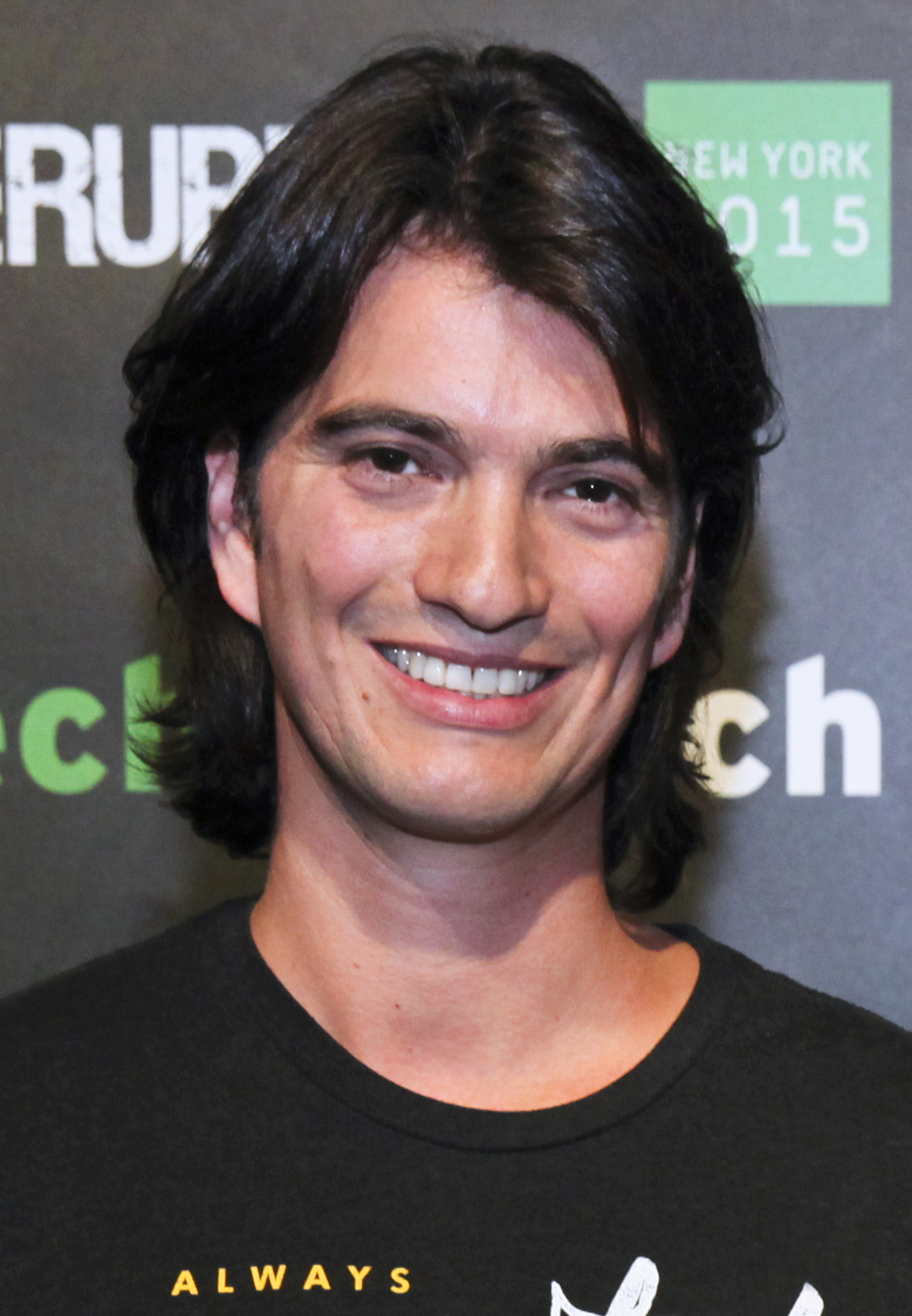
Adam Neumann ('17), co-founder of WeWork

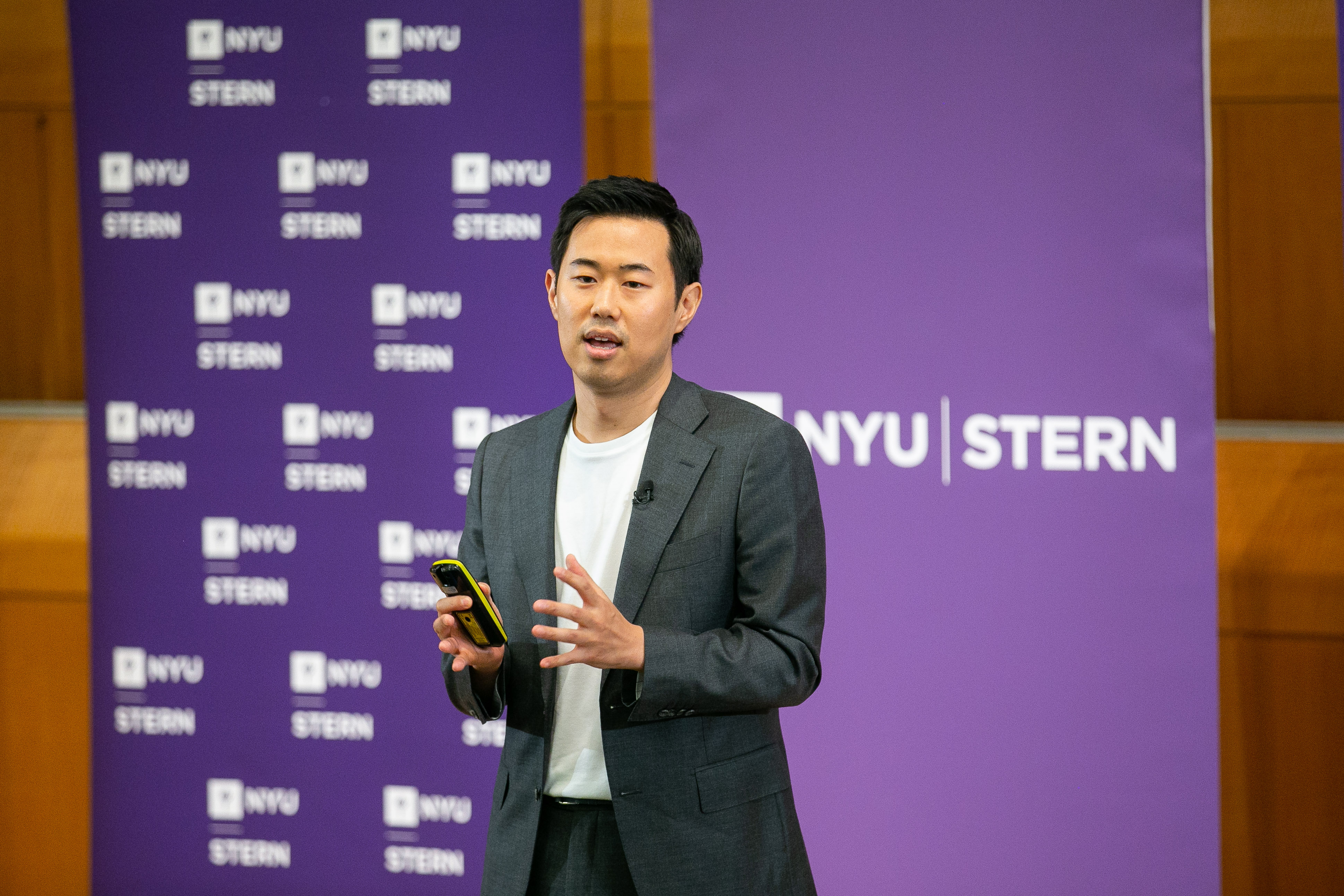
Rim Ji-hoon ('22), former CEO of Kakao Corporation

== Notable faculty ==
- Ervand Abrahamian, Professor of history, Fellow of the American Academy of Arts and Sciences
- Abraham J. Briloff, Professor of accounting, Inductee of The Accounting Hall of Fame in 2014
- Joel Brind, Professor of biology, Scientific advocate of the abortion–breast cancer hypothesis
- Mario Cuomo, former 3-term governor of New York State, Taught a public affairs seminar in the fall of 2008
- Matthew Goldstein, former chancellor of The City University of New York, Taught mathematics and statistics
- David Gruber, Marine biologist and National Geographic Explorer, Presidential Professor of Biology and Environmental Sciences at the City University of New York
- Ted Joyce, professor of economics, research associate at the National Bureau of Economic Research
- Douglas P. Lackey, professor of philosophy, playwright
- John Liu, former New York City Comptroller, mayoral candidate, and former member of the New York City Council, Taught municipal finance and policy in the School of Public Affairs
- Kenneth L. Marcus, former Assistant Secretary for Civil Rights at the United States Department of Education, Taught courses on Diversity Management and Civil Rights Law
- Harry Markowitz, Professor of Finance, recipient of Nobel Prize in Economics (1990)
- Wendell Pritchett, Chancellor of Rutgers University–Camden, Interim Dean and Presidential Professor at the University of Pennsylvania Law School, and Provost of the University of Pennsylvania
- Carla Robbins, Clinical Professor, former deputy editorial page editor of The New York Times
- David Rosner, Ronald H. Lauterstein Professor of Sociomedical Sciences and professor of history in the Graduate School of Arts and Sciences at Columbia University; Co-director of the Center for the History and Ethics of Public Health at Columbia's Mailman School of Public Health; member, National Academy of Sciences' Institute of Medicine (class of 2010)
- Donna Shalala, Secretary of Health and Human Services under the Clinton Administration, Taught politics at Baruch in the 1970s
- Clarence Taylor, Emeritus Professor of history
- John Trinkaus, former Professor of Management and Dean, recipient of Ig Nobel Prize
- Yoshihiro Tsurumi, Professor of international business, scholar in multinational business strategy and national competitiveness
