= Weissman School of Arts and Sciences =

Coordinates: 40.74038°N 73.98338°W

- Type: Public; Arts and sciences school
- Established: 1968
- Parent institution: Baruch College (CUNY)
- Dean: Jessica Lang
- Location: Manhattan, New York City, New York, United States
- Website: weissman.baruch.cuny.edu

The Weissman School of Arts and Sciences (commonly known as Weissman) is the arts and sciences school of Baruch College. Named after George Weissman, former president of Philip Morris, and his wife Mildred, the Weissman School of Arts and Sciences is one of the three schools that comprise Baruch College and offers the Bachelor of Arts degree in various disciplines. While the Zicklin School of Business is the largest school at Baruch College, Weissman offers a majority of the courses in the required core curriculum for undergraduates.

== Undergraduate programs ==
Weissman offers the Bachelor of Arts degree in:

- Actuarial Science
- Art
- Biology/Pre-Medicine
- Business Communication (with specializations in Corporate or Graphic Communication)
- Economics (BBA option offered by the Zicklin School)
- English Literature
- History
- Journalism (with specializations in Journalism/Creative Writing or Business Journalism)
- Liberal Arts and Sciences Ad Hoc Major
- Management of Musical Enterprises
- Mathematics
- Music
- Philosophy
- Political Science
- Psychology
- Sociology
- Anthropology
- Spanish
- Statistics

== Graduate programs ==
Weissman also offers several programs leading to a Master's Degree:

- Corporate Communication (MA)
- Arts Administration (MA)
- Financial Engineering (MS)
- Clinical Mental Health Counseling (MA)
- Industrial/Organizational Psychology (MS)
- Industrial/Organizational Psychology (PhD)

In October 2009, the MS program in Financial Engineering was ranked as one of the top ten in North America by QuantNetwork. In 2023, it was ranked the top program for the fourth consecutive year.
