= Marxe School of Public and International Affairs =

Public policy school of Baruch College

Coordinates: 40.74039°N 73.98338°W

- Type: Public; Public policy school
- Established: 1994
- Parent institution: Baruch College (CUNY)
- Dean: Sherry Ryan
- Location: Manhattan, New York City, New York, United States
- Website: marxe.baruch.cuny.edu

The Marxe School of Public and International Affairs (commonly known as the Marxe School) is the public policy school of Baruch College. It was established in 1994 and is the only City University of New York school dedicated to public affairs.

== History ==
In 1919, the City College School of Business and Civic Administration was established and would later become Baruch College. In 1951, the Department of Political Science in the school offered its first course in Masters in Public Administration. In 1968, Baruch College was created through a split from the City College School of Business. In 1980, the Masters of Public Administration (MPA) program was accredited by Network of Schools of Public Policy, Affairs, and Administration, the first accredited program in New York City. In 1984, the college started offering Executive MPA courses, the first in New York City and the second in the United States. The Austin W. Marxe School of Public and International Affairs was established in 1994 with Ronald M. Berkman as the founding dean. He worked there from 1994 to 1997. The School of Public and International Affairs was later named after Austin W. Marxe who donated $30 million to the college in 2016. Austin W. Marxe was a 1965 graduate of Baruch College and an investment banker. It was the largest donation to Baruch College and the second largest in the history of City University of New York.

== Academics ==
The Marxe School of Public and International Affairs offers the following degree programs: Master of Public Policy, Master of Public Administration, Online Master of Public Administration, Master of International Affairs, Master of Science in City Planning, Master of Science in Education (Higher Education Administration), Online Doctorate in Education (Higher Education Administration), Bachelor of Science in Public Affairs (including in-person, online, and accelerated Bachelor-Master 4+1 programs), undergraduate minor in Public Service, and graduate certificate programs both in public communication and in quantitative methods for policy and equity analysis.

It also houses several academic research centers, including the Center for Nonprofit Strategy and Management (CNSM), CUNY Institute for Demographic Research (CIDR), New York Federal Statistical Research Data Center (NYRDC), and the Howard J. Samuels State and City Policy Center.

== Rankings ==
U.S. News & World Report placed the Marxe School of Public and International Affairs at 34th nationally in its ranking of MPA degrees in 2019.

== Notable alumni ==
The school reports more than 10,000 alumni. Graduates include New York City officials, members of the New York, New Jersey and Maryland state legislatures, and leaders of nonprofit organizations and universities.

- Tony Allen (MPA 1998), president of Delaware State University
- Fernando Ferrer (MPA 2004), former borough president of the Bronx and former acting chairman of the Metropolitan Transportation Authority
- Vanessa Gibson (MPA 2009), borough president of the Bronx
- Cristina Jiménez Moreta (MPA 2011), co-founder of United We Dream and a 2017 MacArthur Fellow
- Verna L. Jones (MPA 1987), former member of the Maryland Senate
- Ron Kim (MPA 2006), member of the New York State Assembly
- Melissa Mark-Viverito (MPA 1995), former speaker of the New York City Council
- Francisco Moya (MPA 2014), former member of the New York City Council
- Yuh-Line Niou (MPA 2011), former member of the New York State Assembly
- Steven Raga (MPA 2015), member of the New York State Assembly since 2023 and the first Filipino American elected to the New York State Legislature
- Craig A. Stanley (MPA 1999), former member of the New Jersey General Assembly
- Mosharraf Zaidi (MPA 2001), Pakistani policy analyst and columnist, named a Young Global Leader by the World Economic Forum in 2014
