= William and Anita Newman Library =

Coordinates: 40.74076°N 73.98277°W

William and Anita Newman Library Information and Technology Building
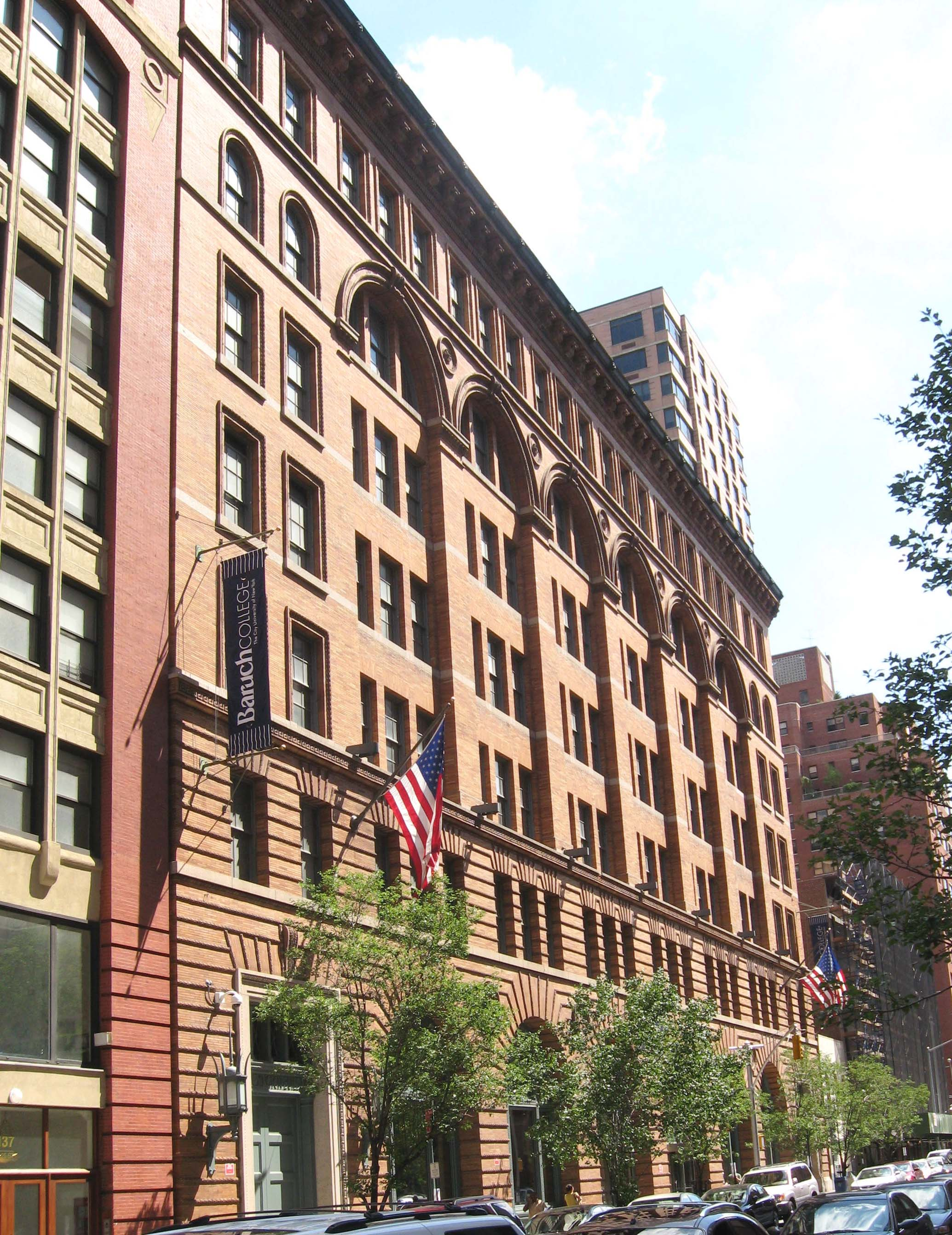
- Location: Manhattan, New York City, New York, United States
- Type: Academic library
- Established: 1994

Other information
- Director: Stephen Francoeur (interim)
- Website: library.baruch.cuny.edu
- Building details
- Former names: The Lexington Building

General information
- Architectural style: Renaissance
- Completed: 1895
- Renovated: 1994

Technical details
- Floor count: 7

Design and construction
- Architect: J. William Schickel

Renovating team
- Renovating firm: Davis, Brody and Associates

The William and Anita Newman Library is the main library for the students and faculty of Baruch College, a constituent college of the City University of New York. It is located on the 2nd-5th floors of the Information and Technology Building (also known as the Newman Library and Technology Center), at 151 East 25th Street in Rose Hill, Manhattan, New York City.

The building was originally known as the Lexington Building or the 25th Street Power House. It was erected in 1895 as the main powerhouse for the Lexington Avenue cable car line, and was later used as an electrical substation when the line began operating streetcars. The upper floors were used as office and manufacturing space. In the late 1980s and 1990s, the building was purchased by Baruch College as part of its new campus and renovated for library and academic use, opening in 1994.

== Description ==
=== Original building design ===
The library is housed in what was formerly the Lexington Building, with entrances from East 25th Street to the south and East 26th Street to the north in the Rose Hill section of Manhattan. The building is located in the middle of the block between Third Avenue to the east and Lexington Avenue to the west. The block directly to the south is occupied by the Newman Vertical Campus. In between both buildings is the 25th Street Pedestrian Plaza.

The building was designed by architect J. William Schickel in Italian Renaissance style. It is seven-stories tall with a basement. It has a brick outer facade with granite and terra cotta trim. The internal structure consists of cast iron. The ground floor of both the 25th and 26th Street facades feature numerous arches. The basement and ground floor of the building originally supported the infrastructure for the streetcar substation. The basement contained the boiler room, featuring eight Babcock and Wilcox boiler boilers. It also featured a coal and ash conveyor system built by the C.W. Hunt Company. The engine room was located above the boilers in what is now the second floor. It featured two steam engines, a Reynolds-Corliss engine and an Allis engine.

The six upper floors were designed to be leased as offices, warehouse space, and manufacturing space. In the center of the upper floors was an open courtyard, with a lightwell that extended to the top of the building. The building was constructed with large freight and passenger elevators at the 26th Street side of the building. The building also had an elevator for trucks.

=== Newman Library modifications ===
The current Baruch College Technology Building occupies 300,000 square feet (28,000 m^{2}) of space. The main entrance to the building is from the 25th Street Plaza at the south side of the building, via two revolving doors built into archways in the building. Located on the first floor is the "Media Center", along with the Wasserman Trading Floor and Subotnick Financial Services Center of Baruch College's Zicklin School of Business. The Newman Library occupies the second through fifth floor, which have a combined seating for 1,450. The second floor was formerly the engine room of the power house. The sixth floor houses a computer lab called the Baruch Computing and Technology Center. On the seventh floor is the Newman Conference Center, featuring a large 200-person conference room and four smaller conference rooms, along with a kitchen and lounge. Several offices are also located on this floor, including the financial aid and international student offices. At least one additional partial floor above the seventh floor was added as part of the renovations.

The indoor courtyard and lightwell of the Lexington Building have been converted into an atrium, with the addition of a glass roof atop the lightwell to create a skylight. The atrium extends from the second floor through the center of the building. The skylight is 90 feet (27 m) tall and 70 feet (21 m) wide. At the seventh floor, several indoor trees encircle the atrium.

An elevator and stairs at the main entrance lead from the ground floor to the second floor. Two additional elevator banks at the west end of the building, and a staircase adjacent to the atrium run between the second and seventh floors.

=== Transportation ===
The Newman Library is served by the M101, M102, and M103 buses, which operate northbound along Third Avenue and southbound along Lexington and Third Avenues. The M23 Select Bus Service route operates crosstown along 23rd Street, two blocks south of the building. The closest New York City Subway stations are the 23rd Street–Baruch College and 28th Street stations on the 6 and <6> trains at Park Avenue.

== History ==
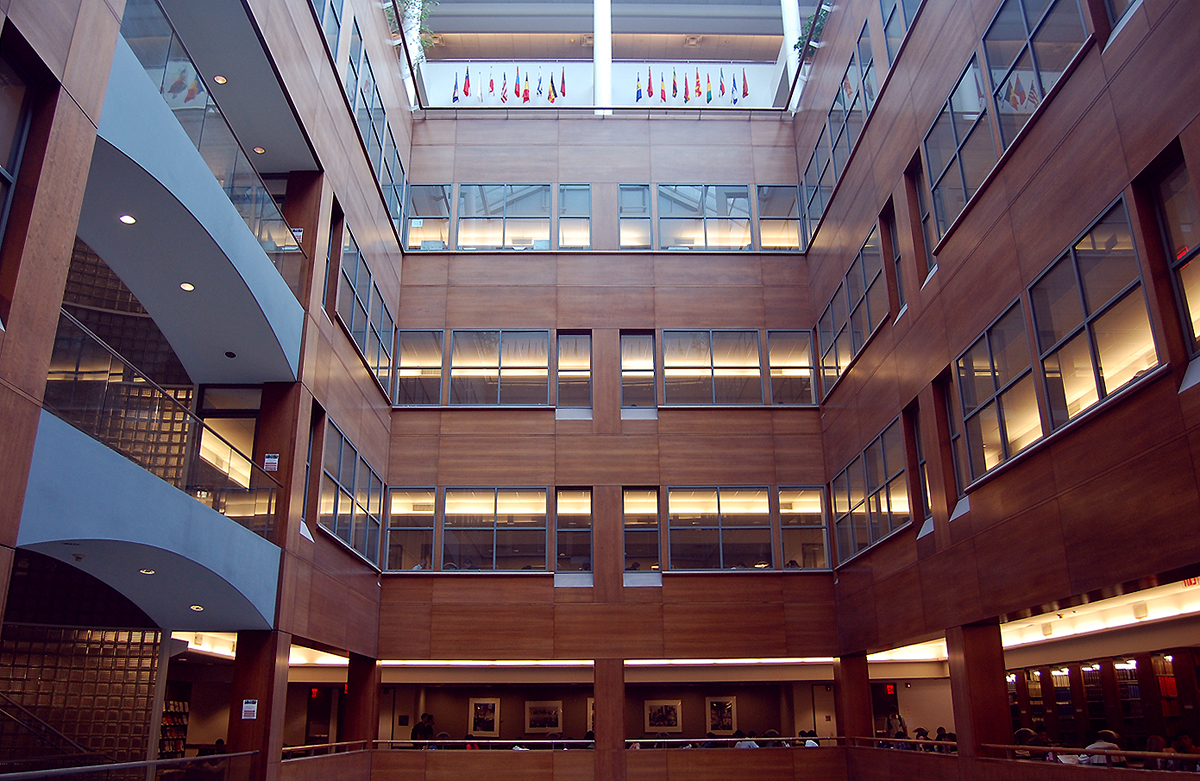
The atrium within the Newman Library

The Lexington Avenue surface line originally began service in April 1895 as a horsecar route. On October 13, 1895, the line began operating as a cable railway. The 25th Street Power House, also known as the Lexington Building, was constructed so it could pull the cables. One of the first tenants of the upper portion of the Lexington Building was McClure's magazine. Their offices and printing plant were located on the sixth floor of the building, occupying 33,000 square feet (3,100 m^{2}) of space. The company became Doubleday & McClure in 1897, but continued to occupy the Lexington Building. In 1901, the Lexington Avenue Line was converted from a cable car line into an electric streetcar line. At this time, the Lexington Building was downgraded from a power house into a substation, converting alternating current into direct current. After McClure's was sold to creditors in 1911, on May 1, 1913, the sixth floor facility was taken over by The Publishers' Weekly.

With the opening of subway lines in the city including the Lexington Avenue subway, streetcar lines began losing patronage. On March 25, 1936, buses replaced the Lexington Avenue streetcars, rendering the Lexington Building useless as a power station.

On September 10, 1986, the nearby Baruch College announced a $252 million plan for a new campus between Lexington Avenue and 3rd Avenue, from 24th to 26th Streets. The plans were developed along with the Davis, Brody and Associates architectural firm. The new campus would include the Lexington Building (referred to as "Site A"), which had been identified as a potential state or national landmark. The school planned to renovate the building for use as a library, computer center, and for offices and student groups, at the cost of $50 million. The renovations would be made within New York State historic preservation guidelines. The plan was controversial because of the building's historical status, as well as opposition from existing tenants in the building (including a carpentry school) who would have to relocate. In addition, since the building owners opposed sale of the building, the New York State Dormitory Authority planned to acquire the building via eminent domain. The renovations by Davis, Brody and Associates were completed in 1994, costing $153.5 million. The Newman Library was dedicated on May 19, 1994.

== Awards ==
- 1995: Library Buildings Award, American Library Association and the American Institute of Architects
- 2003: Excellence in Academic Libraries Award, Association of College and Research Libraries

== Memberships ==
- Center for Research Libraries
- Metropolitan New York Library Council
