= Jihoon Rim =

Korean Tech entrepreneur, Venture capitalist and Academic (born 1957)

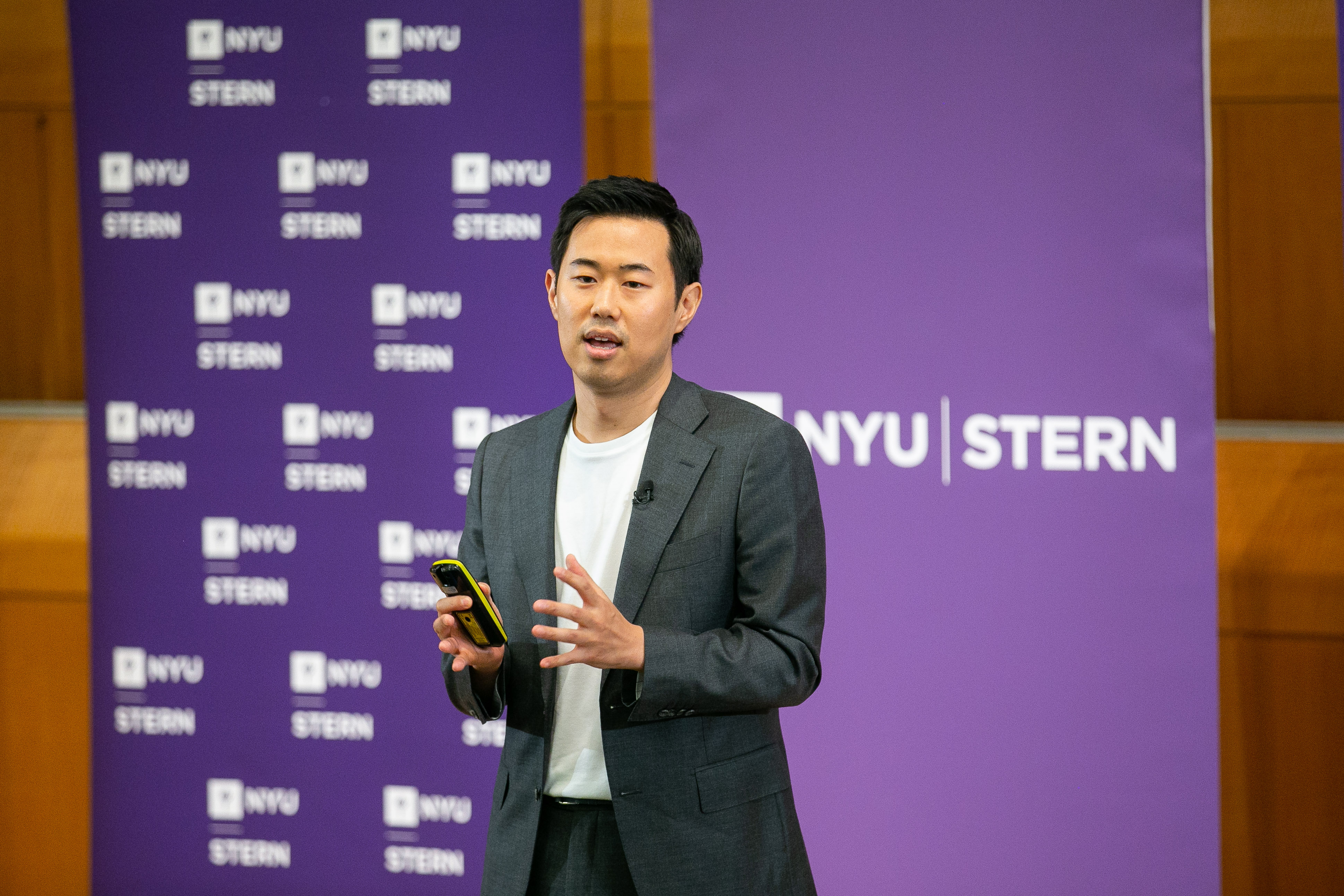
- NYU Stern Digital Innovation Conference, ©Slezak: Courtesy of NYU Photo Bureau
- Born: 28 September 1980; Seoul, South Korea
- Education: Bachelor of Science
- Alma mater: KAIST, Korea Advanced Institute of Science & Technology

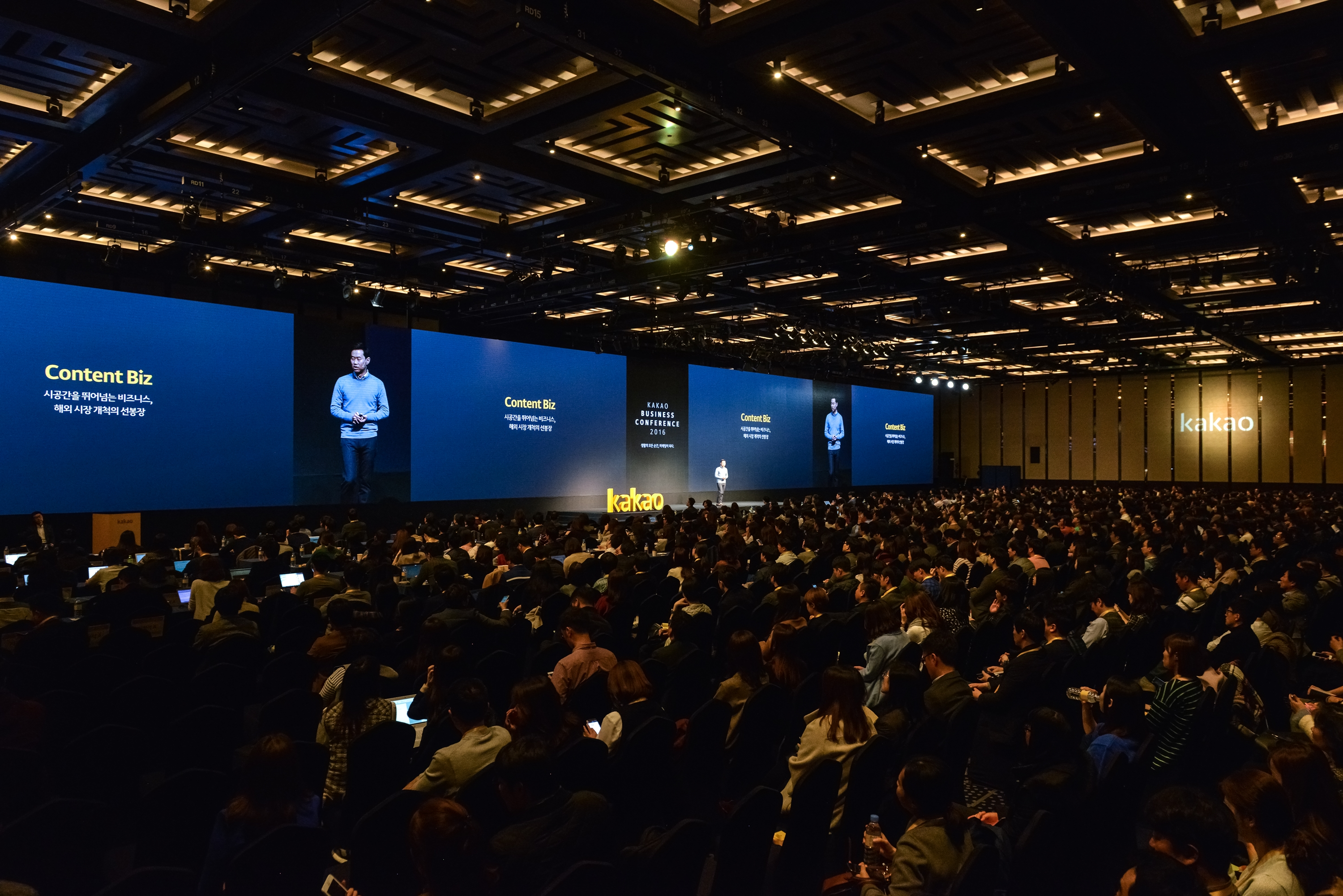
Jihoon Rim, CEO of Kakao Corp.

Jihoon Rim (born September 28, 1980) is a tech entrepreneur, venture capitalist, and academic. He is an Adjunct Professor in the Department of Management and Organizations at New York University Stern School of Business where he teaches technology and entrepreneurship. He is a former CEO and Board Director of Kakao Corp. (KRX:035720), one of South Korea's largest public technology companies, and the founder of KCube Ventures. He served as consultant and testifying expert witness for the U.S. Federal Trade Commission in FTC v. Meta Platforms, Inc. (2023-2025).

== Early life and education ==
Rim was born on September 28, 1980 in Seoul, Korea. He earned a Bachelor of Science in Industrial Engineering from Korea Advanced Institute of Science and Technology (KAIST) in February 2004, receiving the Industrial Engineering Best Graduate Award.

== Early Career ==
Following his studies, Rim fulfilled South Korea's national service obligation through civilian placements at Accenture and Naver, South Korea's largest search engine. Upon completing his national service, he joined The Boston Consulting Group as an Associate Consultant, before moving into venture capital at SoftBank Ventures Asia, the venture capital arm of Softbank Group, where he served as Principal from 2007 to 2012.

== KCube Ventures ==
In March 2012, Rim founded KCube Ventures, an early-stage venture capital firm in South Korea. Under his leadership, the firm quickly became one of the most reputable venture firms in the country. Its inaugural $10 million fund returned more than $1 billion to investors, recognized as the best-performing VC fund in South Korean history. KCube Ventures was acquired by Kakao Corp. in 2015. Rim continued to serve as Board Director of Kakao Ventures until 2018.

== Kakao Corp. ==
In 2015, Rim was appointed CEO and Board Director of Kakao Corp., South Korea's leading public technology company, best known for its mobile messaging platform KakaoTalk. At 34 years of age, he became the youngest CEO among South Korea's top 500 companies.

Taking on the role during a challenging period, Rim led a turnaround of the company, expanding Kakao into fintech, mobility, and digital content while championing major investments in artificial intelligence. During his tenure, Kakao's revenue and operating profit nearly doubled. Among the largest transactions of his tenure was the acquisition of LOEN Entertainment for approximately $1.6 billion, one of the most significant tech M&A deals in South Korea at that time.

== Academic Career ==
Professor Rim joined NYU Stern School of Business in 2019 as Executive-in-Residence at the Fubon Center for Technology, Business and Innovaiton. He subsequently served as a full-time Visiting Professor of Management Practice before transitioning to his current role as Adjunct Professor in the Department of Management and Organizations. He teaches Managing a High-Tech Company: The CEO Perspective and Founding a Startup in the MBA and EMBA program, and Technology and Entrepreneurship in the TRIUM Global Executive MBA program, a joint degree offered by NYU Stern, the London School of Economics, and HEC Paris.

== FTC v. Meta Platforms ==
From 2023 to 2025, Rim served as a consultant and testifying expert witness for the U.S. Federal Trade Commission in FTC v. Meta Platforms, Inc., the antitrust case in which the FTC alleged that Meta had accumulated monopoly power through its acquisitions of Instagram and WhatsApp. Rim's expert testimony, delivered on April 21, 2025, focused on the growth trajectories of Instagram and WhatsApp prior to their acquisitions, arguing that both platforms were highly likely to have succeeded independently. His testimony and demonstrative exhibits are formally documented in the FTC's official case record.

== Philanthropy ==
Rim is the founder and sole funder of the Jihoon Rim Foundation, a nonprofit organization that provides scholarships and mentorship to college students of Korean heritage. The foundation awards 20 scholarships of $10,000 each annually to Korean-American students enrolled at four-year universities along the U.S. East Coast, and hosts networking and mentorship events throughout the year.

== Awards ==
- The AIS Leadership Excellence Award: Presented annually by the Association for Information Systems to one individual who has demonstrated exemplary leadership and innovation in the use and development of information systems.
- Korea's Best CEO (2017): Selected by Insight Korea based on a nationwide survey of South Korean university students. Rim received 12.6% of total votes, placing ahead of JY Lee, Vice Chairman of Samsung Group, who received 6.8%.
- Korea's Top 10 Hero (2018): Selected by Maeil Broadcasting Network (MBN), which annually recognizes ten top achievers across fields including business, government, sports, and the arts.
