= List of Baruch College alumni =

Baruch College is a public college in New York City, New York. Following are some of its notable alumni.

== Business ==
Name	Class	Major	Notability	References
Lara Abrash	1994	MBA	Chairman and CEO of Deloitte & Touche LLP	
William F. Aldinger II	1959		Chairman and CEO of HSBC North America Holdings	
Anthony Chan	1979	BBA	Chief economist with JP Morgan Chase Bank, N.A.	
Akis Cleanthous	1988	BBA	Former chairman of the Cyprus Stock Exchange	
Monte Conner	1986		Senior vice president of Roadrunner Records, A&R department	
Sidney Harman	1939	BBA	Founder and chairman emeritus of Harman International Industries	
Jacqueline Hernández	1996	MBA	Former chief marketing officer with NBCUniversal Telemundo	
Robert Holland	1969	MBA	Former president and CEO of Ben & Jerry's	
Rim Ji-hoon	2022	DBA	Former CEO of Kakao Corporation	
Mayuri Kango	2007	MBA	Head of Industry at Google India and actress	
James Lam	1983	BBA	Former chief risk officer of GE Capital and author	
Ralph Lauren	non-degreed		Founder and chairman of Ralph Lauren Corporation	
Dennis Levine	1976	MBA	Prominent player in the Wall Street insider trading scandals of the mid-1980s	
Adam Neumann	2017	BBA	Co-founder and CEO of WeWork	
Oscar N. Onyema	1998	MBA	CEO of the Nigerian Stock Exchange	
Martin Shkreli	2004	BBA	Founder and former CEO of Turing Pharmaceuticals	
Stuart Subotnick	1962	BBA	CEO of Metromedia and one of America's 500 wealthiest people in 2002	
George Weissman	1939	BBA	Former chairman and CEO of Philip Morris International	
Jacky Wright	1985	BBA	CTO at McKinsey & Company and former chief digital officer at Microsoft	
Larry Zicklin	1957	BBA	Former chairman of the board of Neuberger Berman	

== Education ==
Name	Class	Major	Notability	References
Tony Allen	1998	MPA	Chair of the US President's Board of Advisors on Historically Black Colleges and Universities and president of Delaware State University	
Michael J. Freeman	1970	MBA	Professor at Baruch College, Cornell University, and Hofstra University	
David Hamilton Golland	2000		Dean of the School of Humanities and Social Sciences and professor of history at Monmouth University	
Alvin Gouldner	1941	BBA	Professor of sociology at Washington University in St. Louis, founder of Theory & Society, and former president of the Society for the Study of Social Problems	

== Entertainment ==
Name	Class	Major	Notability	References
Eddie Carmel			Entertainer with gigantism and acromegaly, popularly known as "The Jewish Giant"	
Buddy Freitag	1953		Broadway producer (Porgy and Bess, Nice Work If You Can Get It)	
Tsvetta Kaleynska	2015	EMPA	Model and author	
Mayuri Kango	2007	MBA	Actress and head of Industry at Google India	
Daniel Lobell			Stand-up comedian and podcaster	
Jennifer Lopez	non-degreed		Actress, singer, dancer, and producer	
Neil Reshen	1960		talent manager, lawyer, and accountant	
Tarkan			Singer	
Bernie Wes	1939		Television screenwriter	
Perizaad Zorabian	1966	MBA	Actress	

== Government and civil service ==
Name	Class	Major	Notability	References
Jack Barsky	1984		Former KGB spy and author	
Fernando Ferrer	2004	MPA	Former chairman of MTA (New York) and former Bronx borough president	
Daniel A. Nigro	1971	BBA	Former commissioner of the New York City Fire Department	
Albert Seedman	1941	BBA	Chief of detectives, New York City Police Department	
Eric Ulrich	2016	MPA	Commissioner of the New York City Department of Buildings	

== Law ==
Name	Class	Major	Notability	References
Carolyn Walker-Diallo	2003	MBA	Supervising judge of the New York City Civil Court	
Helen Whitener	1988	BBA	Associate justice of the Washington Supreme Court	

== Literature and journalism ==
Name	Class	Major	Notability	References
Jack Barsky	1984		Former KGB spy and author	
G. Winston James	2005	MBA	Poet and activist	
Tsvetta Kaleynska	2015	EMPA	Author and model	
Carlos D. Ramirez			Publisher of El Diario La Prensa	
Upton Sinclair			Author of The Jungle	

== Politics ==
Name	Class	Major	Notability	References
Egemen Bağış	1996	MPA	Former minister for European Union Affairs and Turkish politician	
Shirley Elizabeth Barnes	1956	BBA	Former U.S. ambassador to Madagascar	
Abraham Beame	1928	BBA	Mayor of New York City	
Fernando Ferrer	2004	MPA	Former chairman of MTA (New York) and former borough president of the Bronx	
Vanessa Gibson	2009	MPA	Borough president of the Bronx	
Michael Grimm	1994	BBA	Former member of United States House of Representatives	
Carl Heastie	2007	MBA	Speaker of the New York State Assembly	
Verna L. Jones	1987	MPA	Former member of the Maryland Senate	
Ron Kim	2006	MPA	Member of the New York State Assembly	
Melissa Mark-Viverito	1996	MPA	Former speaker of the New York City Council	
Yuh-Line Niou	2011	MPA	Member of the New York State Assembly	
Diana Richardson			Former politician	
Ada L. Smith	1973		Former member of the New York State Senate	
Michael G. Sotirhos	1950	BBA	Former U.S. ambassador to Greece	
Carl Spielvogel	1975	BBA	Former U.S. ambassador to Slovakia	
Craig A. Stanley	1999	MPA	Member of New Jersey General Assembly 1996–2008	
Leo C. Zeferetti	non-degreed		Former member of United States House of Representatives	

== Sports ==
Name	Class	Major	Notability	References
Danny Garcia	1975		Baseball player	
Levy Rozman	2017		Chess International Master	
Bruce Sherman	1973	MBA	Chairman and principal owner of the Miami Marlins	
Arki Dikania Wisnu	2010		Professional basketball player	

== Other ==
Name	Class	Major	Notability	References
Cristina Jiménez Moreta	2011	MPA	Immigration activist who co-founded United We Dream in 2017; MacArthur Fellow	
