= Zicklin School of Business =

Business school of Baruch College

Coordinates: 40.74039°N 73.98338°W

- Type: Public; Business school
- Established: 1919
- Parent institution: Baruch College (CUNY)
- Dean: Bruce W. Weber
- Location: Manhattan, New York City, New York, United States
- Website: zicklin.baruch.cuny.edu

The Zicklin School of Business is the business school of Baruch College. It was established in 1919 and is named after financier and alumnus Lawrence Zicklin. Zicklin is the largest business school in the United States, with more than 10,000 students enrolled in its programs. Zicklin , The Murray Koppelman School of Business at Brooklyn College, and the Lucille and Jay Chazanoff School of Business at the College of Staten Island are the only three units of the City University of New York that are accredited by the Association to Advance Collegiate Schools of Business (AACSB).

== History ==
In 1919, the City College of New York established a School of Business and Civic Administration, offering its first MBA program one year later. The school was renamed in 1953 in honor of Bernard M. Baruch, a noted statesman and financier who was instrumental in the school's formation. In 1968, after the addition of arts and sciences departments and degree programs, Baruch College became a senior college within the CUNY system.

In 1998, Baruch College's business school was renamed the Zicklin School of Business, in recognition of an $18 million donation by Lawrence and Carol Zicklin. Later, Zicklin made an additional $2 million donation to endow Baruch College’s Center for Financial Integrity. Lawrence Zicklin was a former chairman of the board of investment management firm Neuberger Berman.

== Academics ==
Zicklin offers the following degree programs: BBA, MBA, Executive MBA, MS in Finance, MS in Business Analytics, MS in Information Systems, MBA in Health Care Administration, and MS in Industrial and Labor Relations.

Joint degrees are available with other institutions, such as a JD/MBA (with Brooklyn Law School or New York Law School, and a PhD in Business (with the CUNY Graduate Center).

=== Undergraduate programs ===
The BBA program offers majors in Accountancy, Computer Information Systems, Economics, Finance, Industrial/Organizational Psychology, International Business, Management, Marketing Management, Real Estate, and Statistics and Quantitative Modeling.

=== Centers and institutes ===
Zicklin also has a number of specialized or cross-disciplinary centers and institutes, including:

- Lawrence N. Field Center for Entrepreneurship, which draws together faculty, students, advisors, alumni and volunteers to support start-ups and established businesses and the college’s constituents.
- Steven L. Newman Real Estate Institute, which provides applied research, continuing education and conferences to the real estate industry.
- Wasserman Trading Floor/Subotnick Financial Services Center, which includes a functional trading floor with 55 professional workstations, providing experiential learning opportunities.
- Weissman Center for International Business, which supports international opportunities for students, including international internships, study abroad programs, and seminars with international executives.
- Robert Zicklin Center for Corporate Integrity, which provides a forum for discussion of issues related to business ethics, including: transparency of corporate reporting, corporate governance, legal and ethical corporate behavior, executive accountability, corporate responsibility in global business development, risk assessment and amelioration, conflicting corporate stakeholder interests, and the role of governmental regulation.

== Rankings ==
Business school rankings

U.S. MBA Rankings
- Bloomberg (2025): 48
- U.S. News & World Report (2026): 49

- U.S. News & World Report, in its 2023-24 ranking of "Best Business Schools," listed Zicklin as #49 nationally, making it the #1 public business school in New York.
- In 2015, Forbes ranked MBA programs for "best return on investment," and Zicklin ranked #55 nationally.
- The Princeton Review and Entrepreneur magazine ranked Zicklin #5 in 2018 among colleges nationally for its undergraduate entrepreneurship program, and #10 for the graduate school program.
- Crain's New York Business included Zicklin in 2014 on its list of "top 25 MBA programs in the New York Area."

== Notable alumni ==
- William F. Aldinger III ('69), businessman
- Abraham Beame ('28), 104th Mayor of New York City
- Mark Bloch, artist, archivist and writer
- Anthony Chan ('79), chief economist, JPMorgan Chase Bank, N.A.
- Akis Cleanthous (BBA '88), former chairman of the Cyprus Stock Exchange
- Sam Eshaghoff, real estate developer
- Sidney Harman ('39), founder of Harman International Industries
- Carl Heastie (MBA '07), 120th Speaker of the New York State Assembly
- Robert Holland, businessman
- G. Winston James, writer and activist
- Mayuri Kango (MBA '07), actress
- James Lam ('83), author
- Ralph Lauren (dropped out), fashion designer
- Adam Neumann (BBA '17), co-founder of WeWork
- Martin Shkreli ('04), founder of Turing Pharmaceuticals
- Elissa Shevinsky, businesswoman
- Carl Spielvogel (BBA '57), former U.S. Ambassador to Slovakia
- Stuart Subotnick (BBA '62), CEO of Metromedia
- Carolyn Walker-Diallo, lawyer
- George Weissman (BBA '39), former chairman and CEO of Philip Morris International
- Larry Zicklin (1957), businessman
- Michael Grimm (BBA, '91), former U.S. representative

== See also ==
- List of United States business school rankings
- List of business schools in the United States
- Weissman School of Arts and Sciences
- Marxe School of Public and International Affairs
