= W. E. Hutton & Co. =

W. E. Hutton & Co. was an American investment bank that became a powerhouse Wall Street stock brokerage. It was founded in Ohio in 1887 and was absorbed by Thomson & McKinnon Auchincloss Kohlmeyer, Inc., another investment bank. in 1974.

== History ==
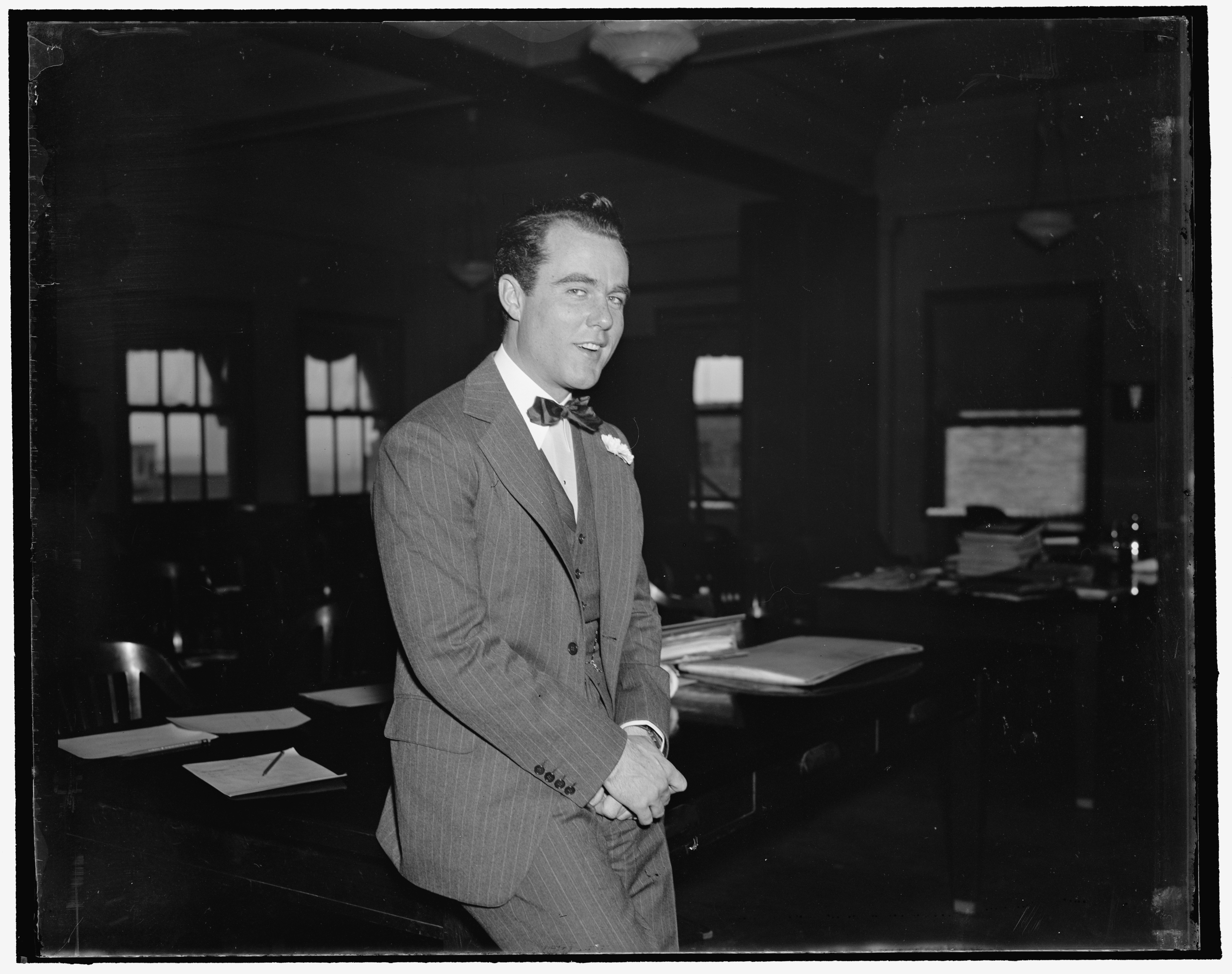
William E. Hutton III, the founder's grandson, testifying before the Securities and Exchange Commission, 1937

The firm was founded in Cincinnati in 1887 by William E. Hutton. Hutton stepped down in 1925 and was succeeded in the business by his sons, James Morgan Hutton and William Dunn Hutton. His nephews, Edward Francis Hutton and Franklyn Laws Hutton, were the founders of the New York brokerage house of E. F. Hutton & Co., which was unaffiliated with his firm.

In 1935, Joseph Iglehart and Benjamin D. Williams, the heads of the bond department of Field, Glore & Co. both joined Hutton and the firm took over the Baltimore office of Field, Glore & Co.

In 1937, counsel for the Securities and Exchange Commission attempted to show that the firm "unlawfully obtained information from a stock specialist's book in 1935-36." Executives from the Atlas Tack Corporation testified on behalf of Hutton. His eldest son, James Morgan Hutton, was senior partner of the firm upon his death in 1940.

=== 1974 merger ===
By July 1974, the firm had already lost $1 million on top of the $2 million it had lost the previous year, leading it to negotiate a merger into Thomson & McKinnon Auchincloss Kohlmeyer (which was led by chairman William E. Ferguson and president John J. Maloney Jr.). The merger was announced by William E. Hutton, senior partner and grandson of the founder of the Hutton firm. The Thomson firm was itself a result of a 1970 merger between Thomson & McKinnon and Auchincloss, Parker & Redpath, followed by a 1973 merger with Kohlmeyer and Co. and with Halle & Stieglitz.

On July 8, 1974, Thomson & McKinnon Auchincloss Kohlmeyer, Inc., took control of the W. E. Hutton & Co. offices in Boston, Baltimore, Los Angeles, San Francisco, Philadelphia, Chicago, Washington, D.C., Atlanta, and Fort Lauderdale, Florida followed by an absorption of another twenty offices, including in Maine and Hutton's strongest region, Ohio, where it had offices in Cincinnati, Dayton and Columbus. The Wayne, New Jersey office, however, joined Bache & Co. instead of Thomson & McKinnon Auchincloss.

== See also ==
- Hugh D. Auchincloss
