= Robert Berman =

Robert or Bob Berman may refer to:

- Bob Berman, American astronomer and science popularizer
- Bob Berman (baseball) (1899–1988), American Major League catcher
- Robert Berman (banker), American banker, co-founder of Neuberger Berman
- Robert A. Berman (born 1959), American businessman of Monticello Raceway and Empire Resorts
- Robert J. Berman, Swedish mathematical scientist
- Robert Berman (character), a character from Image Comics

== See also ==
- Bob Burman (1884–1916), American racecar driver
