= Tsvetta Kaleynska =

Bulgarian author, marketing consultant and model

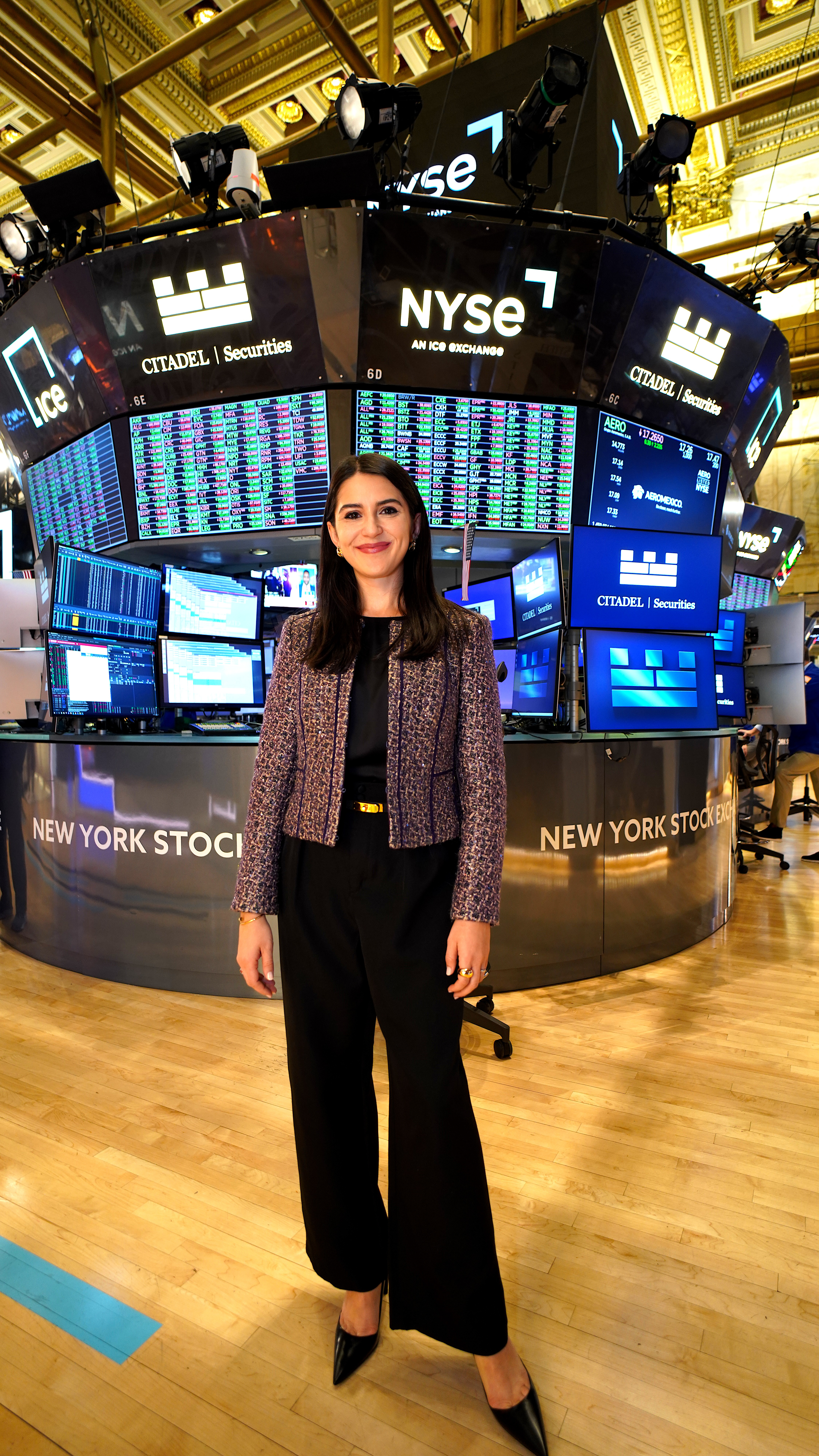
- Kaleynska at the New York Stock Exchange
- Born: June 19, 1988 (age 38); Veliko Tarnovo, Bulgaria
- Occupations: Businesswoman, entrepreneur, media personality

Tsvetta Kaleynska (Bulgarian: Цвета Калейнска, born June 19, 1988), known professionally as Tsvetta, is a Bulgarian-American businesswoman, entrepreneur, and media personality. She is the founder and CEO of RILA Global Consulting, a consumer intelligence and market research firm, and GLORION MEDIA, a media and talent company. She is the co-creator and co-host of "The Money Signal: From Main Street to Wall Street", a financial markets podcast produced alongside NYSE floor trader Peter Tuchman. A recurring television commentator on consumer trends and markets across Bulgarian and U.S. networks, she is recognized for building businesses and media platforms from the ground up.

== Early life and education ==
Tsvetta was born and raised in Veliko Tarnovo, Bulgaria in the family of a university professor and a gynaecologist, both of Bulgarian descent.

In 2008, she moved to the United States on an academic scholarship to pursue her higher education.

In 2012, she graduated from St. Francis College, with dual degrees in Marketing Management and International Business and Economics.

In 2015, she received a master's degree in public administration from the City University of New York at Baruch College.

She later obtained a PhD from Veliko Tarnovo University, further strengthening her academic background in business, communication, and analytical disciplines.

== Career and writing ==
In 2012, Tsvetta joined Dogs Bollocks 5 as a consulting strategist specializing in social media analysis and market research.

In 2015 she moved to Brandwatch as customer success director.

In 2019, she founded RILA GLOBAL CONSULTING, a boutique consumer insights and social listening agency. The company focuses on analyzing digital conversations to uncover trends, risks, and opportunities across industries.

Tsvetta has held leadership roles on the Peace Corps Executive Board and the Girls Leading Our World Executive Board.

Tsvetta published her first book of poetry, Flowers From Heaven, in 2011. Her work has been featured in outlets such as the national scientific magazine "Българска наука" (Bulgarian Science), Bulgaria Cosmopolitan magazine and other newspapers and magazines in Eastern Europe.

In 2014, Kaleynska published her second book, #TheQueen: Social Media.

In 2023, she published Историята на Кукерите (The Story of Kukeri), a bilingual coloring book celebrating Bulgarian heritage. The book features texts in both Bulgarian and English and was gifted to the library of the Consulate General of Bulgaria in New York City.

In 2024, Kaleynska wrote a series of children's books titled Sweet Dreams, designed to promote foreign language literacy. The series includes editions such as Sweet Dreams, New York City, available in multiple languages including Polish, Serbian, Bulgarian, Arabic, and Spanish, as well as other global city editions.

She also authored the Coloring …, Architectural Wonders To Inspire series, featuring architectural landmarks from countries including Albania, Turkey, Bulgaria, Serbia, Montenegro, Hungary, Poland, and Greece.

== Entrepreneurship ==
Tsvetta Kaleynska has built her career as a business entrepreneur operating across consumer intelligence, data analytics, and media.

In 2019, she founded RILA GLOBAL CONSULTING, a New York–based social listening and market research firm providing insights to global clients across healthcare, finance, retail, and technology. The company applies real-time digital data and behavioral analysis to strategic decision-making and has contributed to research initiatives supporting pharmaceutical publications and global market analysis.

In 2025, she founded GLORION MEDIA, a media and advertising company focused on podcast production, influencer-led media, and performance-driven digital campaigns. In June 2026, GLORION MEDIA was represented in the international festival for creative industry professionals Cannes Lions 2026 by their talent Peter Tuchman.

Kaleynska's entrepreneurial work spans intelligence, media, and strategy, with a focus on identifying emerging trends and translating data into actionable business insights.

== Media and market commentary ==
Kaleynska has built a parallel career in media, focusing on the intersection of consumer behavior, digital sentiment, and financial markets.

She is the co-creator and co-host of The Money Signal: From Main Street to Wall Street, produced by GLORION MEDIA. The podcast explores how consumer behavior, cultural trends, and digital signals influence financial markets and economic activity.

The show is co-hosted with Peter Tuchman, a trader on the floor of the New York Stock Exchange, often referred to as the "Einstein of Wall Street". The collaboration combines Kaleynska's expertise in social listening and consumer intelligence with Tuchman's real-time experience in financial markets.

Through her media work, Kaleynska contributes commentary on market behavior, consumer sentiment, and global economic trends, bridging digital audience insights with real-world financial activity.

== Mentorship and leadership ==
In 2026, Tsvetta launched a nationwide financial literacy campaign with Peter Tuchman and Junior Achievement (JA) Bulgaria aimed at educating Bulgarian students in finance and business.

Tsvetta has been an active mentor in programs such as Dell Women's Entrepreneur Mentor and the Nasdaq Entrepreneurial Center Mentor.

== Televised appearances ==
Tsvetta began her televised appearances in 2008 through the Miss Diaspora International Pageant.

Since 2011, she has been featured regularly on national TV shows in Bulgaria, including Predi Obed on bTV, TV7, Na Kafe on NOVA TV, TV7, Bulgarian National Television, and Good morning on Bulgaria ON AIR.

Since 2017 she has been a contributor on the national morning show Na Kafe with Gala, covering topics including the Women's March in NYC, Bulgarian Parliamentary election, virtual consumer trends, and holiday trends in New York City and the United States.

In 2024, she appeared on Bloomberg TV Bulgaria to discuss Bulgaria's role in the global AI landscape.

Since 2025, Tsvetta has been featured on numerous U.S. media to discuss consumer sentiment. Appearances include Fox 5 DC and Schwab Network.

== Modeling ==
In 2010, Kaleynska was crowned Miss Bulgaria Diaspora USA and began her modeling career. She has participated in fashion shoots for American and Bulgarian brands.

== Charity work ==
Her volunteer work focuses on empowering adolescent girls through the Girls Leading Our World (GLOW) Leadership Academy in Bulgaria.

She has also supported literacy initiatives, including the national campaign "Да напълним Студентски град с книги" under the patronage of Bulgaria's president, Rosen Plevlenliev.

In 2013, she launched her own literacy campaign, Tsvetta for the colors of the languages, aimed at providing foreign language literature to libraries and schools in smaller communities across Bulgaria.
