= Tuchman =

Tuchman is a surname. Notable people with the surname include:

- Barbara W. Tuchman (1912–1989), American historian, journalist, lecturer and author
- Eric Tuchman, American producer and screenwriter
- Fran Harris-Tuchman (1915–2013), American broadcaster
- Gary Tuchman (born 1960), American retired television reporter
- Gaye Tuchman (born 1943), American sociologist and academic
- Jessica Tuchman Mathews (born 1946), American international affairs expert
- Kenneth D. Tuchman (born 1959), American businessman
- Lauren Tuchman (born 1986), American rabbi
- Maurice Tuchman (born 1936), American curator
- Nancy Tuchman (born 1958), American environmental scientist, educator, and activist
- Peter Tuchman (born 1957), American stock trader
- Phyllis Tuchman (born 1947), American art historian, critic and author
- Walter Tuchman, cryptographer

== See also ==
- Tuckman
