= Tuckman =

Tuckman is a surname. Notable people with the surname include:

- Bruce Tuckman (1938–2016), American psychologist
- Diane Tuckman, American (born in Egypt) artist and author
- Frederick Tuckman, Member of the European Parliament
- Roy Tuckman, American radio personality

== See also ==
- Tuchman
- Tuckman's stages of group development
