= David Stever =

American businessman

David Stever is a former CEO of Ben & Jerry's, an American company that manufactures ice cream. In March 2025, the company's parent company, Unilever, removed him from his post. A lawsuit was filed by Ben & Jerry's later that month, claiming that he was fired for his support of the brand's progressive social activism, which breaks the merger agreement between the two companies.
