= Robert Berman (banker) =

Co-founder of Neuberger Berman

Robert Berman (c. 1910 – June 1, 1954) was the co-founder of Neuberger Berman.

== Biography ==
Berman joined Halle & Stieglitz as a junior employee shortly before the Wall Street crash of 1929. While employed there, he pursued a law degree at night.

In 1939, Berman was a floor broker on the New York Stock Exchange, when he, along with colleague Roy Neuberger, co-founded Neuberger Berman. They began trading stocks out of a small room at the Biltmore Hotel, building a roster of rich clients.

In 1950, their firm started one of the first no-load mutual funds in the United States, the Guardian Fund.

Berman died of leukemia on June 1, 1954, at the age of 44.
