= Neuberger Museum of Art =

Art museum in New York, United States

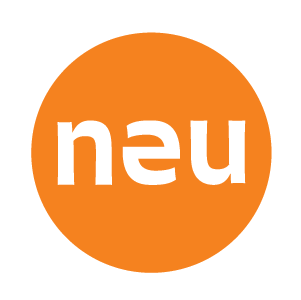

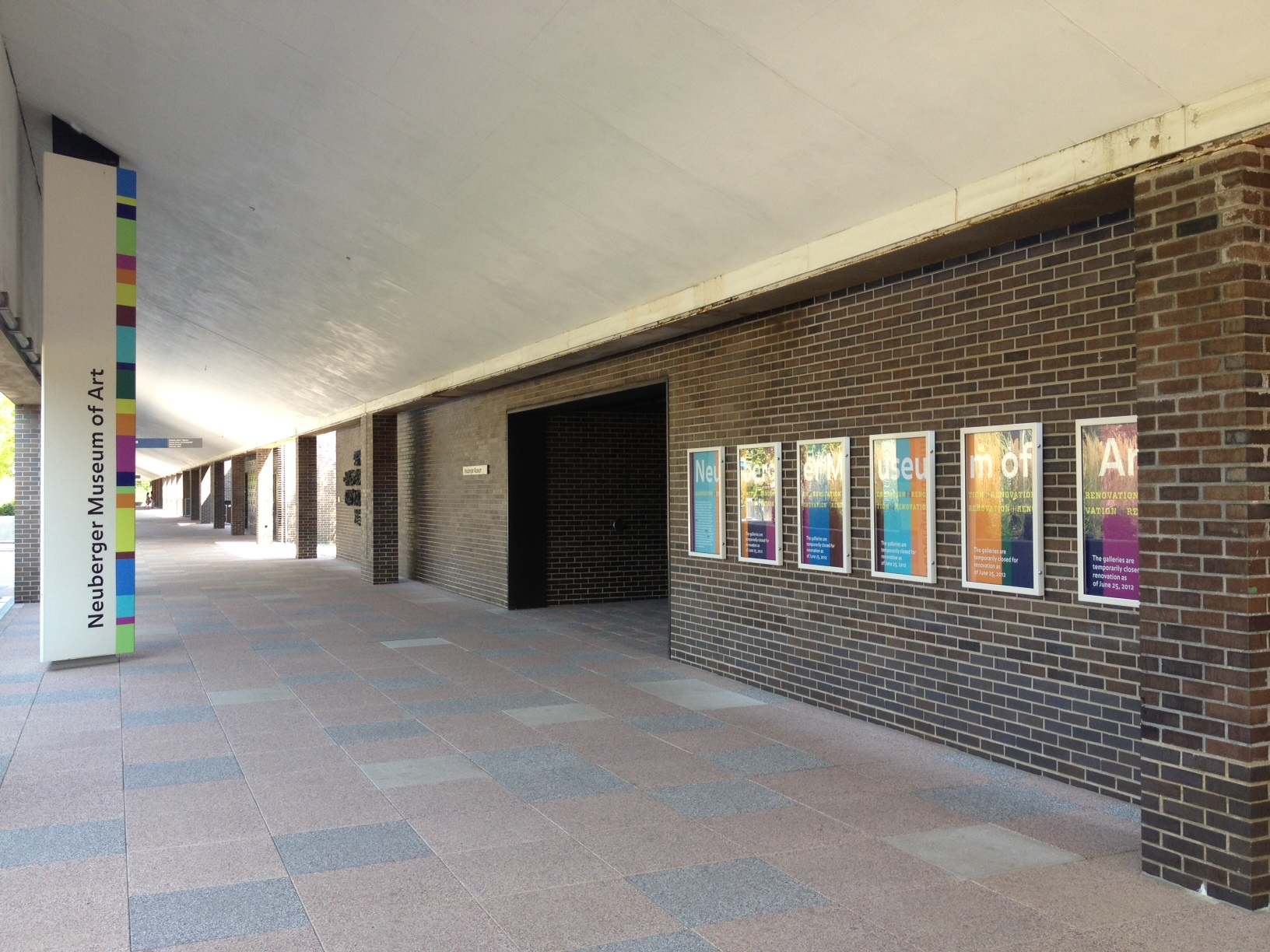
- Neuberger Museum of Art at Purchase College, SUNY

- Location of Neuberger Museum of Art in New York state at State University of New York at Purchase
- Established: 1974
- Location: 735 Anderson Hill Road, Purchase, New York 10577, U.S.
- Coordinates: 41.048195°N 73.702512°W
- Type: Art museum
- Director: Tracy Fitzpatrick
- Architect: Philip Johnson
- Website: Neuberger Museum of Art

The Neuberger Museum of Art (the NEU) is located at the centre of the Purchase College campus in Purchase, New York. With a collection of nearly 7,000 works of modern, contemporary and African art, it is one of the nation's largest academic museums. Exhibition tours, lectures, and special events are held throughout the year.

== Collection ==
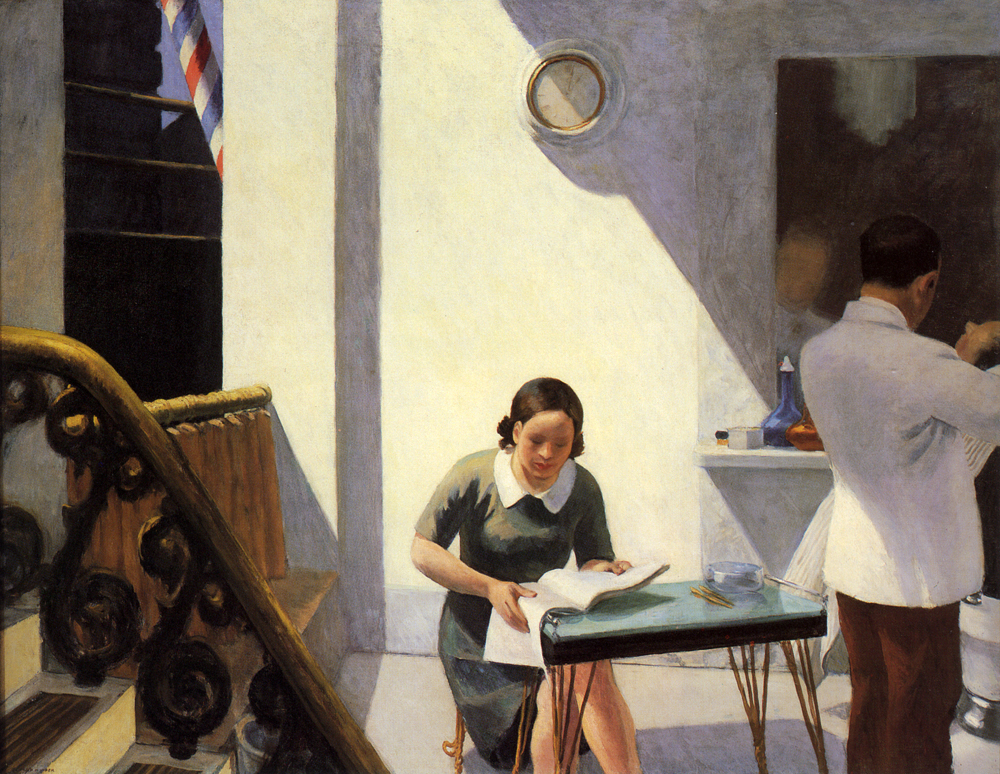
Edward Hopper, Barber Shop, 1931 Oil on canvas, 60 x 78 inches, Collection Neuberger Museum of Art, Purchase College, State University of New York, Gift of Roy R. Neuberger

The Museum was founded in 1969 with a promised gift of 300 works by Roy R. Neuberger—one of the leading private collectors, philanthropists, and arts advocates of the 20th century. The majority of Neuberger's acquisitions, made at the height of his collecting from the early 1940s through the 1960s, were purchased within a month to a year or two of their execution, reflecting his commitment to support living artists working in the United States, particularly during the formative stages of their careers. Neuberger's collection, now the cornerstone of the Museum, totals more than 900 objects and remains the finest personal art collections in a public institution in this country.

The Museum's signature biannual award, the 'Roy R. Neuberger Prize', recognizes the work of exceptional contemporary artists, continuing its founding patron's dedication to supporting artists early in their careers.

Its collection has grown to nearly 7,000 objects and includes works by some of the world's most well-known—and emerging—contemporary artists, including Milton Avery, Romare Bearden, Stuart Davis, Willem de Kooning, Richard Diebenkorn, Arthur Dove, Helen Frankenthaler, Marsden Hartley, Hans Hofmann, Edward Hopper, Georgia O'Keeffe, Jackson Pollock, Mark Rothko, and David Smith.

=== Selected works ===
- Edward Hopper - "Barber Shop" - 1931
- Georgia O'Keeffe - "Lake George by Early Moonrise" - 1930
- Marsden Hartley - "Fishermen's Last Supper, Nova Scotia" - 1940
- John Marin - "Sea and Rocks, Mount Desert, Maine" - 1948
- Lee Krasner - "Burning Candles" - 1955
- Jackson Pollock - "Number 8" - 1949
- Alexander Calder - "The Red Ear" - 1957
- Mark Rothko - "Old Gold Over White" - 1956
- Willem de Kooning - "Marilyn Monroe" - 1954
- Mark Tobey - "Lyric" - 1957
- Grace Hartigan - "Giftwares" - 1955
- Richard Diebenkorn - "Girl on a Terrace" - 1956
- Adolph Gotlieb - "Evil Omen" - 1946

The Neuberger Museum of Art is one of 14 sites on the African American Heritage Trail of Westchester County.

== Directors ==
Tracy Fitzpatrick became director in November 2014.

Previous directors include:

- Paola Morsiani (2012-2014)
- Thom Collins (2005-2010)
- Dr. Lucinda Gedeon (1991-2004)
- Dominique Nahas (1989-1990)
- Suzanne Delehanty (1978-1988)
- Jeffrey Hoffeld (1974-1977)
- Bryan Robertson (1969-1974)

== See also ==
List of university art museums and galleries in New York State
