= Roy S. Neuberger =

Roy Salant Neuberger is an author whose personal focus is Jewish outreach.

His parents are Roy R. and Marie S. Neuberger.

== Biography ==
Prior to becoming a writer, Neuberger had jobs as a National Park Service Ranger and a fire lookout. He was also an editor of a weekly newspaper in Cornwall, New York. Neuberger later took a job as a copy editor for The Long Island Press. In 1978, he became the administrator and secular studies principal of a Brooklyn yeshiva.

From 1991 to 1999, he operated a Wall Street hedge fund which used technical analysis to forecast price changes for securities.

In 2000, after his first book (From Central Park to Sinai: How I Found My Jewish Soul) was published, he and his wife began a public-speaking career during which they have spoken at hundreds of locations in fifteen countries.

=== Family ===
A 2002 book review titled “Conversations with the Neubergers,” written shortly before the release of (father) Roy Rothschild Neuberger's then forthcoming book, “The Passionate Collector,” and shortly after the release of (son) Roy Salant Neuberger's updated edition of “From Central Park to Sinai” included some family tree information. Although Roy S. quotes his grandfather as having said that the Salants are descendants of Rabbi Yisroel Salanter, the reviewer calls this "a lineal point that still remains to be substantiated genealogically" while noting that Mrs. Marie Salant's father Aaron B. Salant, (Roy S's mother's father) did come from the area where Rabbi Salanter began the Musar Movement.

Their daughter Yaffa is married to Rabbi Osher Anschel Jungreis, son of Rebbetzin Esther Jungreis.

== Work ==
- From Central Park to Sinai: How I Found My Jewish Soul (Jonathan David, 2000) ISBN 0-8246-0431-8
- Worldstorm: Finding Meaning & Direction Amidst Today's World Crisis (Israel Bookshop, 2003) ISBN 1-931681-49-X
- 2020 Vision – a novel (Feldheim Publishers, 2008) ISBN 1-59826-213-0
- Working Toward Moshiach (Shepherd Books, 2015) ISBN 978-0-9909667-1-5
- Hold On: Surviving the Days Before Moshiach (Mosaica Press, 2020) ISBN 978-1-946351-88-3

He has also written for several Jewish newspapers, including Yated Ne'eman, The Jewish Press, Five Towns Jewish Times, The Jewish Connection, and The Jewish Star.

Neuberger's wife Leah often helps in the editing and production of his books.

== Outreach ==
Neuberger and his wife Leah have been involved with outreach for over three decades, including public speaking for Hineni.

They have spoken in fifteen countries.

== From Central Park to Sinai ==
From Central Park to Sinai: How I Found My Jewish Soul is Roy S. Neuberger's autobiography, released in 2000. Neuberger describes his life journey and how he rediscovered his Jewish background. The foreword to the book is written by Rebbetzin Esther Jungreis.

=== Reception ===
The book was well received in the Jewish community. Rabbi Yaakov Feitman, former President of The Young Israel Council of Rabbis, wrote that "through this work, Roy S. Neuberger truly also becomes a Rebbe to future generations who will read, be inspired and emulate his example."

A 2003 review of the book notes that the revised paperback edition "offers guidance and counsel in the wake of the Twin Towers disaster" and contains an extensive quote, focusing on Neuberger's statement: "... religion is a continuous process. As long as we exist in this world, the process never ends." Other reviewers have described the book as "a joy to read."
