= Carolyn Walker-Diallo =

American judge

Carolyn Walker-Diallo is an American judge. She was the first Muslim elected as judge in the State of New York.

In 2015, Walker-Diallo was elected to the New York City Civil Court, representing the 7th Municipal Court District, which encompasses Brownsville, Brooklyn, East New York, Cypress Hills and Bushwick. On December 10, 2015, she took her ceremonial oath of office on the Quran.

== Early life and education ==
Walker-Diallo was born in Brownsville, Brooklyn and raised in East New York, Brooklyn and Cypress Hills, Brooklyn. She attended P.S. 290, I.S. 302 and Franklin K. Lane High School.

Walker-Diallo received a Bachelor of Arts in political science and business administration, cum laude, from The Lincoln University of Pennsylvania. She received a Juris Doctor from New York Law School in May 2003 and Master of Business Administration from the Zicklin School of Business at Baruch College.

== Career ==
Walker-Diallo started her legal career as a litigation associate at Milbank LLP. She then joined the New York City Law Department where she defended the City of New York, its agencies and high-level employees in cases brought under various federal, state and city laws.

She also became the head of the George Walker Jr. Community Coalition, Inc. (GWJrCC), named after her father. At GWJrCC, she created the first youth court in East New York.

During this time, Walker-Diallo also served as a part-time administrative law judge/hearing officer with the New York City Office of Administrative Trials and Hearings (OATH) and practiced law in her own firm, the Law and Mediation Offices of Carolyn Walker-Diallo, Esq., PLLC.

Walker-Diallo served as a volunteer mediator with the New York Peace Institute. In 2013, she joined Brooklyn Community Services (BCS). As the organization's General Counsel and Chief Compliance Officer, she served on the Executive Team and handled all legal matters involving the agency.

== Community involvement ==
Walker-Diallo served as a board member of the East New York Restoration Local Development Corporation, a member of the 75th Precinct Community Council, and was founder and troop leader of several Girl Scout troops in East New York and Cypress Hills.

On February 15, 2015, Walker-Diallo received the Distinguished Service Award by New York Assembly Members Charles Barron, Erik Dilan, and Samuel D. Roberts at the New York State Association of Black and Puerto Rican Legislators' 44th annual award ceremony.

== Civil court judge ==
Walker-Diallo launched her campaign for judge in December 2014. She was rated Qualified by the Kings County Democratic Screening Committee. She was also approved by the New York City Bar Association's Screening Committee. She ran unopposed in the general election on November 3, 2015. On December 10, 2015, Walker-Diallo was sworn in as a Civil Court Judge at Brooklyn Borough Hall. Soon after her inauguration, she started receiving death threats, possibly due to swearing in on a Quran.

At the end of 2015, Walker-Diallo was recognized as one of 10 Muslim women who ruled 2015. She assumed the bench on January 1, 2016.

- On April 20, 2016, the Muslim Bar Association of New York honored Walker-Diallo with the Legal Trailblazer Award.
- On June 15, 2016, Walker-Diallo received a citation from Brooklyn Borough President Eric Adams at Brooklyn Heights Synagogue's 9th Annual Iftar.
- In May 2017, the Huffington Post named Walker-Diallo as one of the top 15 Inspirational Muslim Women around the world.
- •In September 2017, the Huffington Post named Walker-Diallo as one of 25 African-American Muslims breaking barriers around the world.

In December 2018, Walker-Diallo was appointed Supervising Judge of the New York City Civil Court, Kings County, effective January 1, 2019. In 2019, she was recognized as one of Crain's 2019 Notable Women in Law.
