= Robert Holland (executive) =

American business executive and entrepreneur (1940–2021)

Robert Holland Jr. (April 11, 1940 – December 22, 2021) was an American business executive and entrepreneur. He served as president and CEO of Ben & Jerry's from 1995 to 1996.

== Life and career ==
Holland grew up in Albion, Michigan. He earned a B.S. in mechanical engineering from Union College in 1962, and he earned an M.B.A. from the Zicklin School of Business at Baruch College.

Holland was an associate and partner with McKinsey & Company, Inc., from 1968 to 1981, then chairman and CEO of Rokher-J Inc. from 1981 to 1984. After serving as chairman and CEO of City Marketing from 1984 to 1987 and chairman of Gilreath Manufacturing, Inc., from 1987 to 1991, he returned to Rokher-J Inc. as chairman and CEO from 1991 to 1995. He then took the position at Ben & Jerry's, resigning after 20 months after philosophical differences with founder Ben Cohen.

He was chief executive officer of office furniture dealer WorkPlace Integrators from 1997 until 2001. From 2001 to 2009, he maintained a consulting practice for strategic development assistance to senior management of Fortune 500 companies. From 2009 he was a managing director and advisory board member of Essex Lake Group, P.C., a strategy and management consulting firm.

Holland served on the boards of directors for Carver Bank Corp., Lexmark International, Inc., Neptune Orient Lines, YUM Brands, and on the advisory board of PepsiCo. He founded the Make-A-Difference Dropout Prevention Program in Detroit, Michigan.

He died on December 22, 2021, at the age of 81. He was interred at Ferncliff Cemetery.
