= Na Kafe =

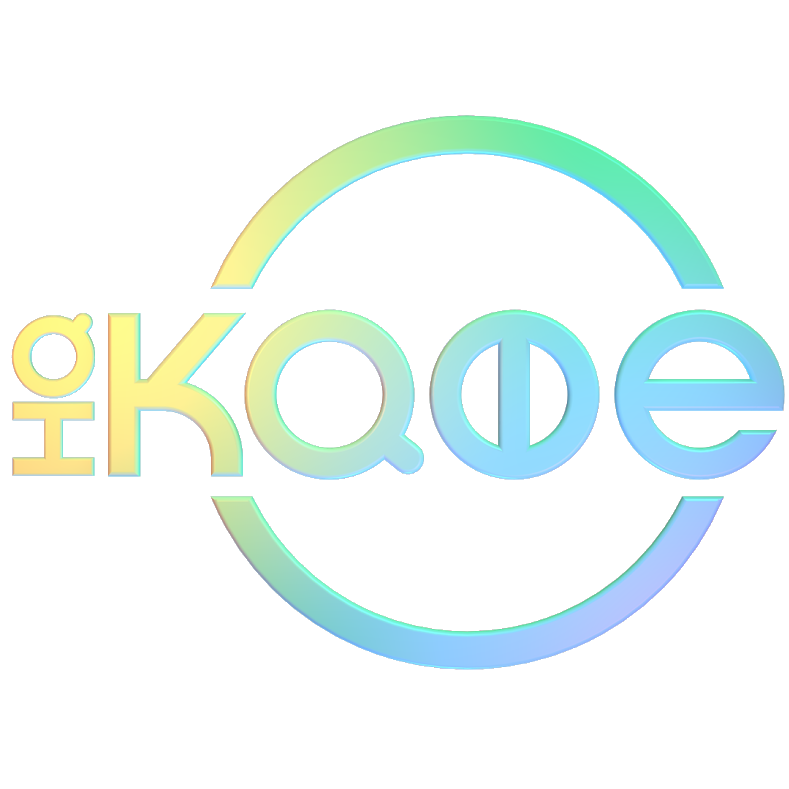
- Bulgarian morning show NA KAFE's logo
- На Кафе
- Genre: Talk show
- Presented by: Gala
- Country of origin: Bulgaria
- Original language: Bulgarian

Original release
- Network: Nova TV
- Release: October 9, 2000 – present

Na Kafe (Bulgarian: "На Кафе"; translate "Over a Coffee") is a Bulgarian talk show that is broadcast on Nova TV, hosted by Gala. The program features news, interviews, fashion and special-interest stories.

== History ==
=== 2000-2005 ===
"Na Kafe" is among the few shows then who live lasting three hours. In 2004, the show began broadcasting and shorter emission Sunday containing principally selected moments from past shows. At the end of July 2005 "Coffee" was removed.

=== 2009-present ===
On February 16, 2009, after almost four years of interruption, "Na Kafe" is back on screen. The format of the show is generally preserved. Broadcast again live every weekday from 9:30 to 12:00.

By the end of the spring season of 2011, one of the regular participants in the show's psychologist Elenko Angelov. There he led the rubric "Theory and evidence of a conspiracy" and "Your extraordinary paranormal experience" ( "VIP experience" - launched in May 2011) in which guests tell about the "mysterious paranormal experiences." But in the autumn of 2011 interrupted its participation there because of disagreements with television. In 2020, Gala was infected with COVID-19, and the show moved online.
