= Ben & Jerry's =

American ice cream company

Ben & Jerry's Homemade Holdings, Inc.

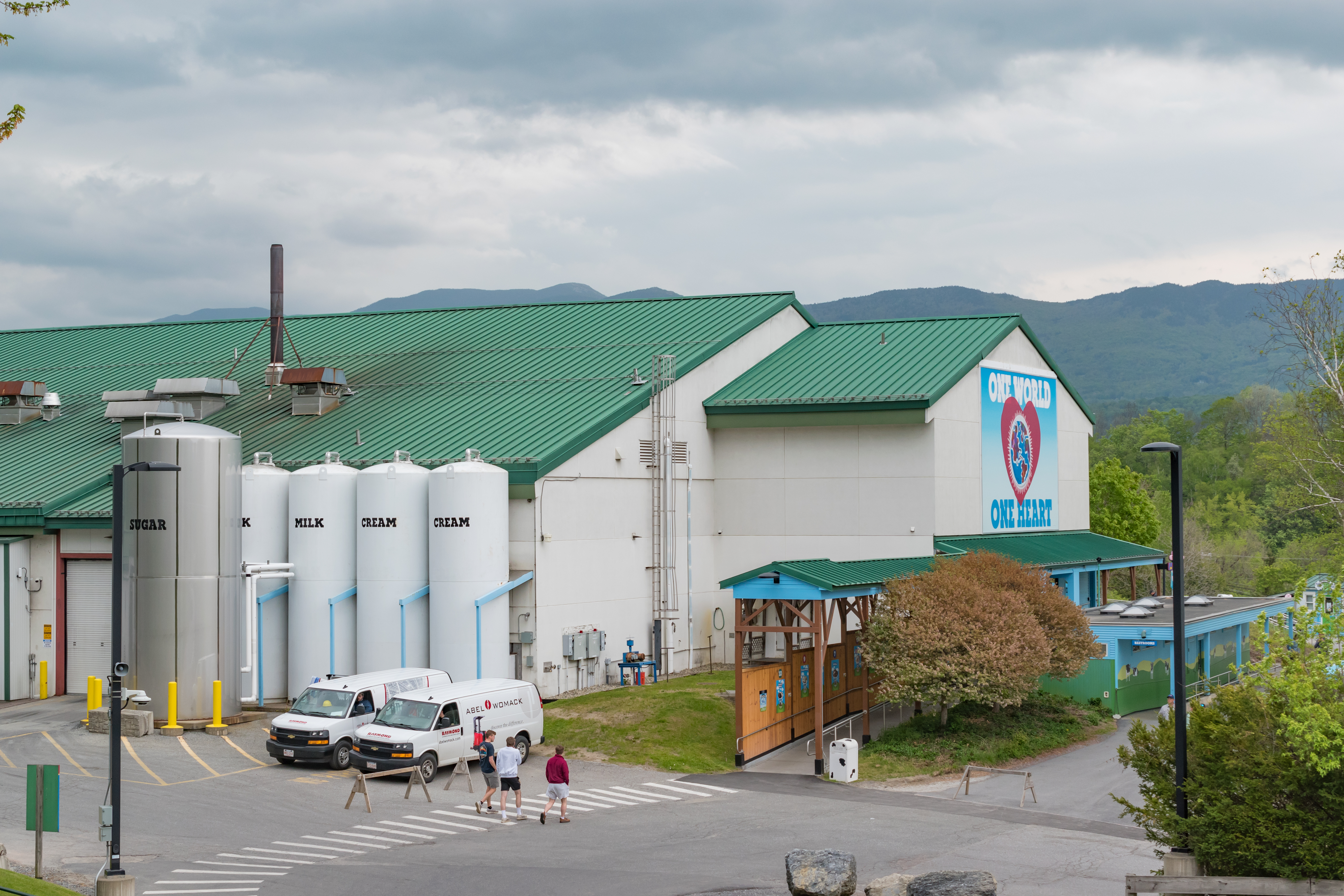
- Factory in Waterbury, Vermont
- Type: Subsidiary
- Industry: Food processing Franchising
- Founded: May 5, 1978; 48 years ago in Burlington, Vermont, U.S.
- Founders: Ben Cohen; Jerry Greenfield
- Headquarters: South Burlington, Vermont, United States
- Number of locations: 573 (2021)
- Area served: Worldwide
- Products: Ice cream
- Parent: The Magnum Ice Cream Company
- Website: www.benjerry.com

Ben & Jerry's Homemade Holdings Inc. is an American company that manufactures ice cream, frozen yogurt, and sorbet. Founded in 1978 in Burlington, Vermont by the eponymous Ben Cohen and Jerry Greenfield, the company went from a single ice cream parlor to a multinational brand over the course of a few decades. The company was sold in 2000 to the British multinational conglomerate Unilever, now The Magnum Ice Cream Company, but operates as an independent subsidiary. Its present-day headquarters is in South Burlington, Vermont, with its factory in Waterbury, Vermont.

Ben & Jerry's is known for their original flavors, many of which incorporate foods and desserts mixed with ice cream. Some of these flavors have been themed after musicians, comedians, and public figures, such as Jerry Garcia, Stephen Colbert, Jimmy Fallon, Colin Kaepernick, and Phish. The company and its two founders have also been noted for their political activism and advocacy for social justice. This includes the way their products have been manufactured, marketed, and distributed.

== History ==
=== Founding ===
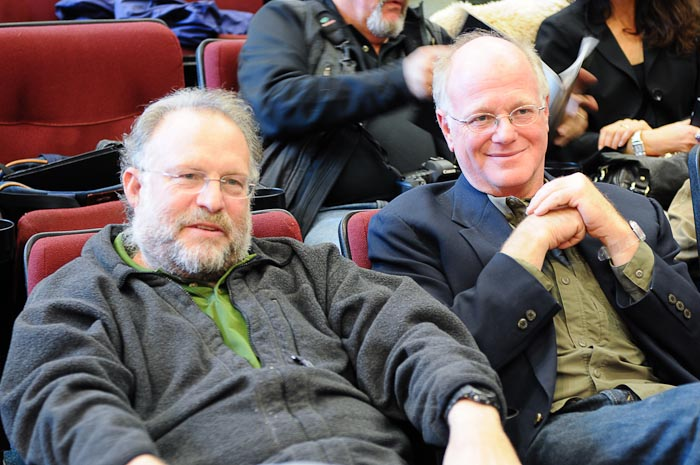
Jerry Greenfield (left) and Ben Cohen in 2010

The company was founded by Ben Cohen and Jerry Greenfield, who had been friends since their childhood in Merrick, New York. Although Greenfield finished college, he was unable to get into medical school. Cohen dropped out of school. In 1977, Cohen and Greenfield incorporated a business, planning to open a bagel shop, but found the requisite equipment was too expensive. They instead completed a correspondence course on ice cream making from Pennsylvania State University's creamery. Cohen has severe anosmia, a lack of a sense of smell, so he relies on mouthfeel and texture to provide variety in his diet. This led to the company's trademark chunks being mixed in with their ice cream. On May 5, 1978, with a $12,000 investment (equivalent to $59,000 in 2025), Cohen and Greenfield opened an ice cream parlor in a renovated gas station in downtown Burlington, Vermont. In 1979, they marked their anniversary by holding the first "free cone day", now an annual event at every Ben & Jerry's store, from that year to 2019, and resuming in 2023.

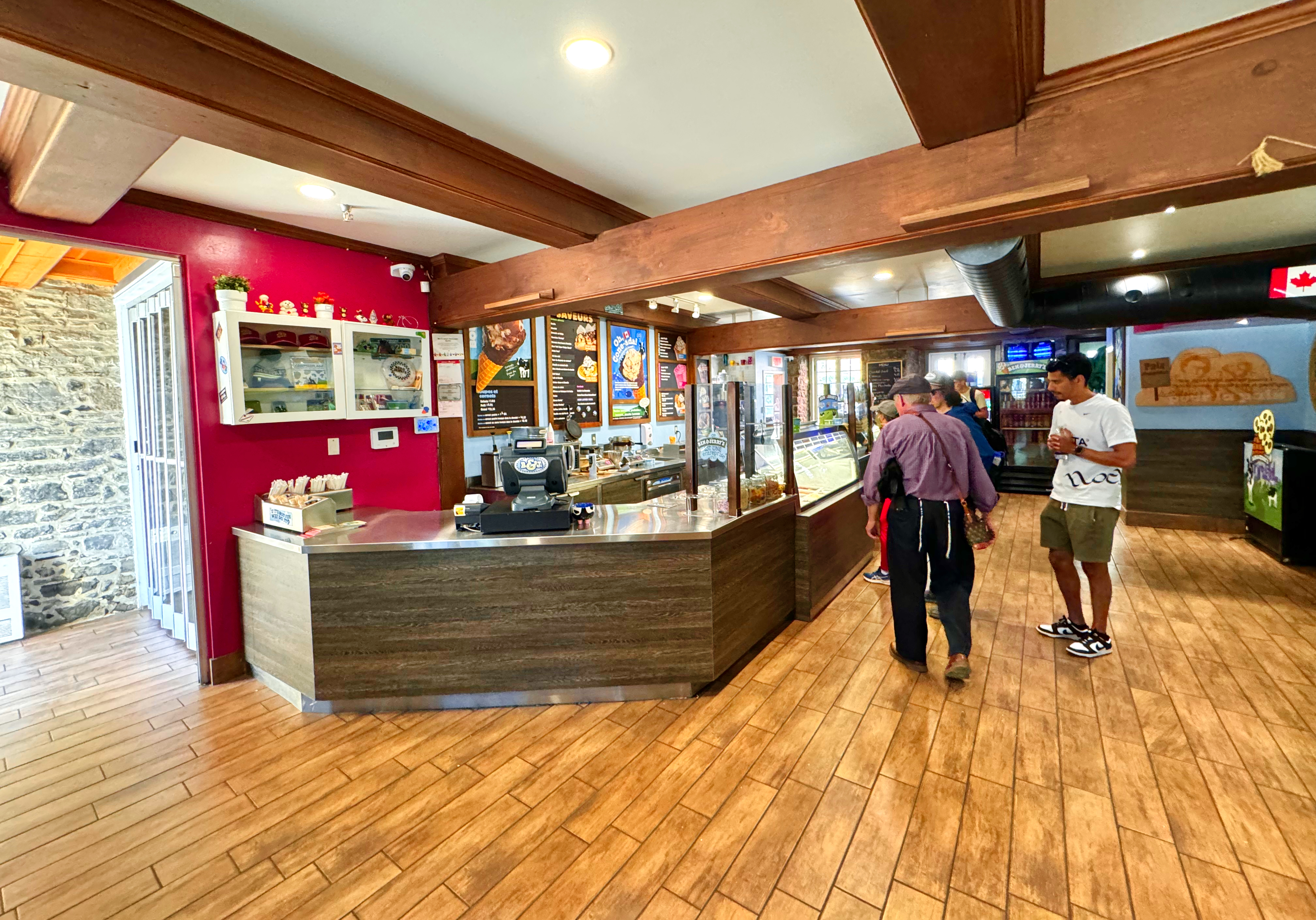
The interior of a Ben & Jerry's ice cream parlor

In 1980, Cohen and Greenfield rented space in an old spool and bobbin mill on South Champlain Street in Burlington and started packing their ice cream in pints. The first Ben & Jerry's franchise opened in 1981, on Route 7 in Shelburne, Vermont. In 1983, Ben & Jerry's ice cream was used to build "the world's largest ice cream sundae" in St. Albans, Vermont; the sundae weighed 27,102 pounds (12,293 kg). That same year, the cows on their cartons were redesigned by local artist Woody Jackson.

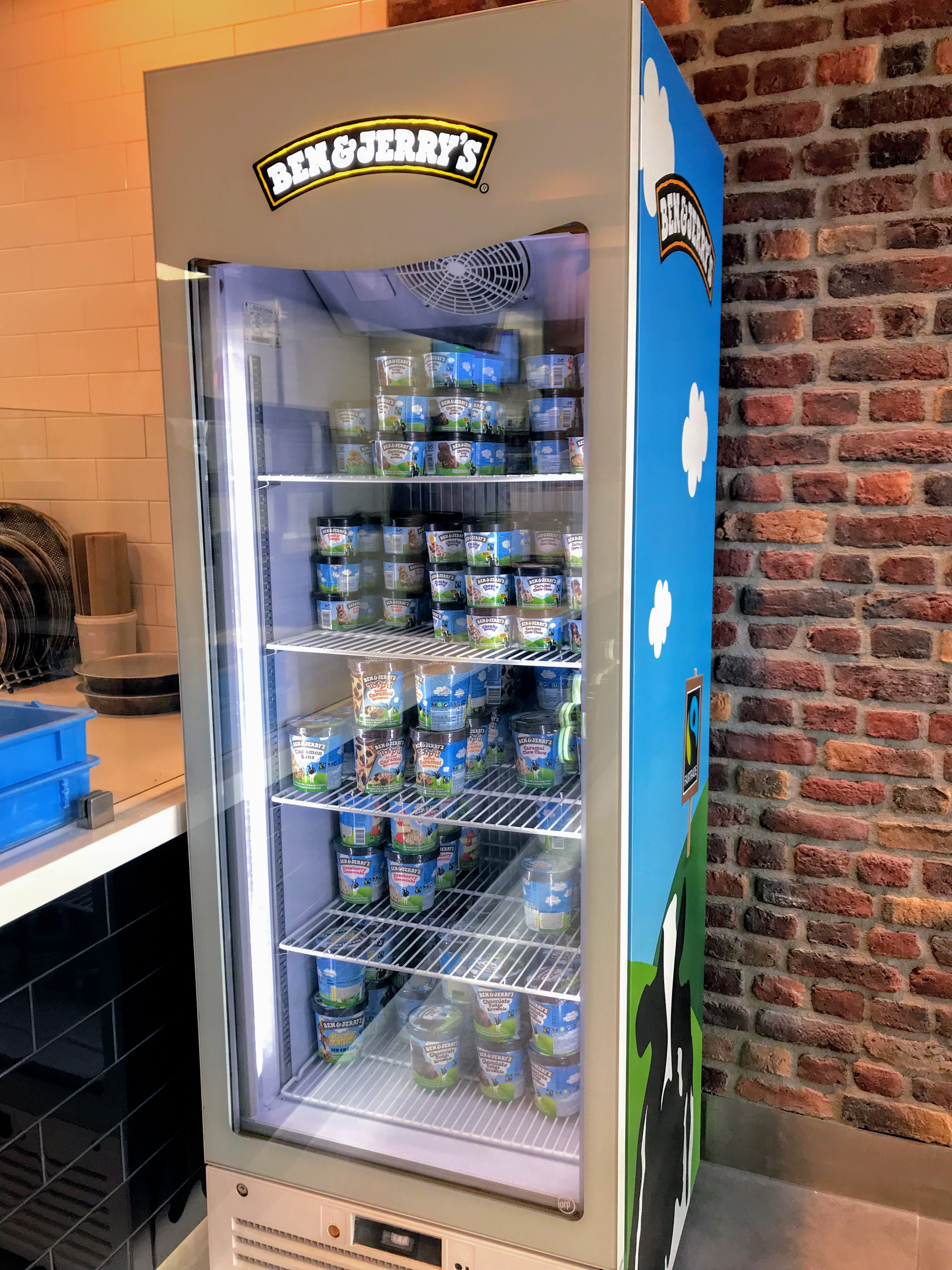
Ben & Jerry's display freezer at a Domino's store

In 1984, Häagen-Dazs wanted to limit distribution of Ben & Jerry's by its distributors in Boston, prompting Ben & Jerry's to file suit against the parent company, Pillsbury, in its "What's the Doughboy Afraid Of?" campaign. In 1987, Häagen-Dazs again tried to enforce exclusive distribution, and Ben & Jerry's filed a second lawsuit against the Pillsbury Company.

In 1984 Cohen and Greenfield sold shares in the company in a Vermont only IPO, raising $750,000 to finance expansion. Cohen retained a 50% stake in the firm while Greenfield retained 10% and moved to Arizona.

In 1985, the Ben & Jerry's Foundation was established at the end of the year with a gift from Ben & Jerry's to fund community-oriented projects; it was then provided with 7.5% of the company's annual pre-tax profits. In 1986, Ben & Jerry's launched its "Cowmobile", a modified mobile home used to distribute free scoops of Ben & Jerry's ice cream in a unique, cross-country "marketing drive", driven and served by Ben and Jerry themselves. The "Cowmobile" burned to the ground outside of Cleveland four months later, but there were no injuries. Ben said it looked like "the world's largest baked Alaska". In 1987, as a tribute to guitarist Jerry Garcia, Ben & Jerry's presented its first ice cream named for a rock legend and the most famous of fan-suggested flavors, "Cherry Garcia".

In 1985, Ben and Jerry's built and opened their factory in Waterbury, Vermont. The factory opened to public tours in 1986 and continues to offer these tours. This facility produces 350,000 or more pints of ice cream a day. It is the only Ben and Jerry's facility open to the public.

In 1988, the two men won the title of U.S. Small Business Persons of the Year, awarded by President Ronald Reagan. Also that year, the first brownies were ordered from Greyston Bakery, which led to the development of the popular Chocolate Fudge Brownie flavor. In 1992, Ben & Jerry's joined in a cooperative campaign with the national non-profit Children's Defense Fund; the campaign goal was to bring children's basic needs to the top of the national agenda. Over 70,000 postcards were sent to Congress concerning kids and other national issues. In 1995, they hired Robert Holland Jr. as CEO after holding a "Yo! I'm your C.E.O." essay contest as part of the search. Holland left after 20 months following philosophical differences and was replaced by Perry Odak in 1997.

In 1989, Ben & Jerry's announced their opposition to the use of recombinant bovine growth hormone (rBGH) in all their products. This genetically engineered hormone is sometimes given to cows to boost milk production, but Ben & Jerry's does not support this practice and is in favor of using less chemically intensive ingredients for the safety of consumers and the environment.

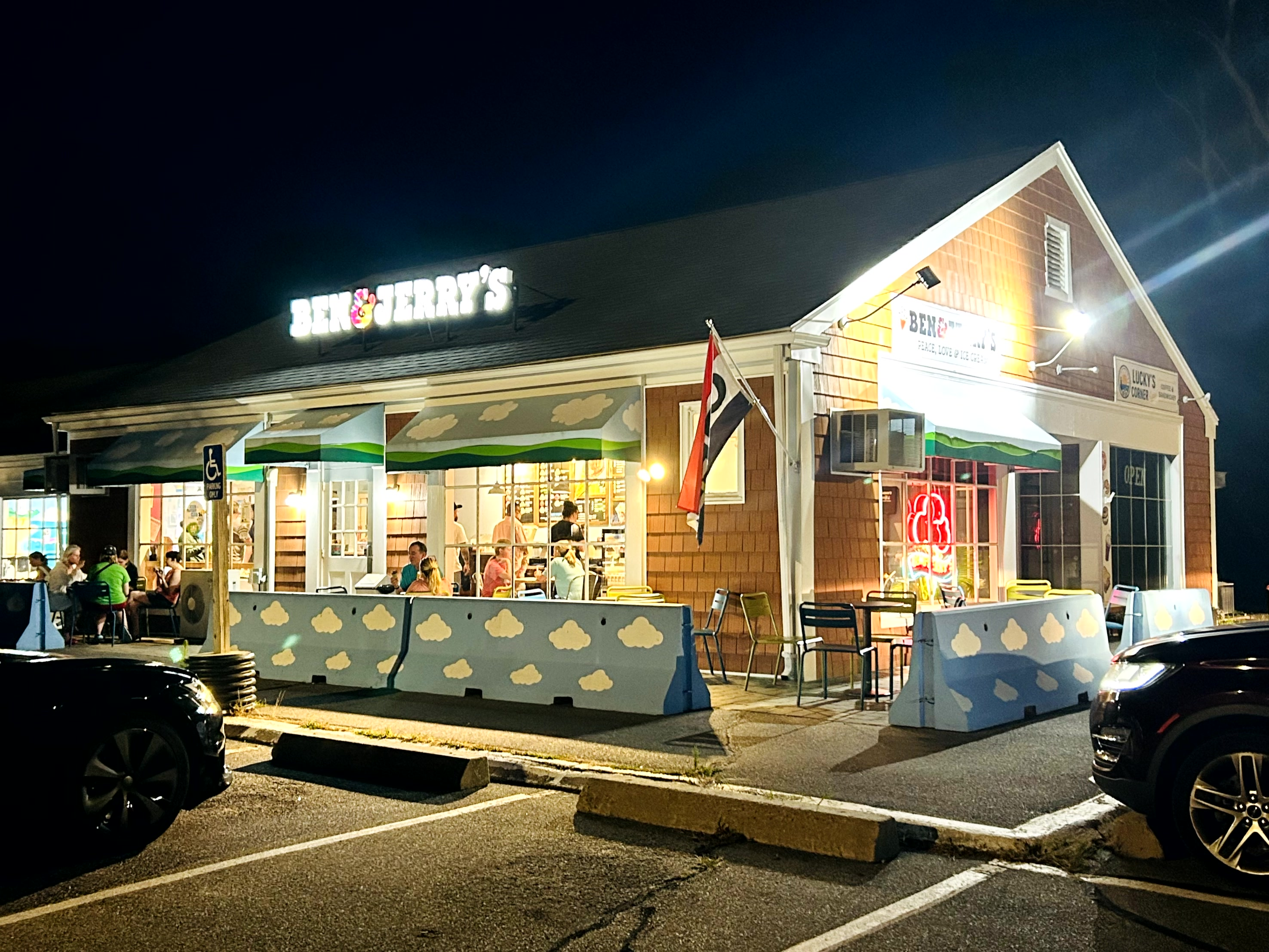
A Ben & Jerry's ice cream shop at night, with customers seated outdoors.

In 1994, Ben & Jerry's: The Inside Scoop, written by Fred "Chico" Lager, former CEO of Ben & Jerry's Ice Cream, was published. The book tracks the history of how Ben & Jerry's Ice Cream got started. The book focuses on "How Two Real Guys Built a Business with a Social Conscience and a Sense of Humor."

=== Unilever era ===
==== Sale of company to Unilever ====
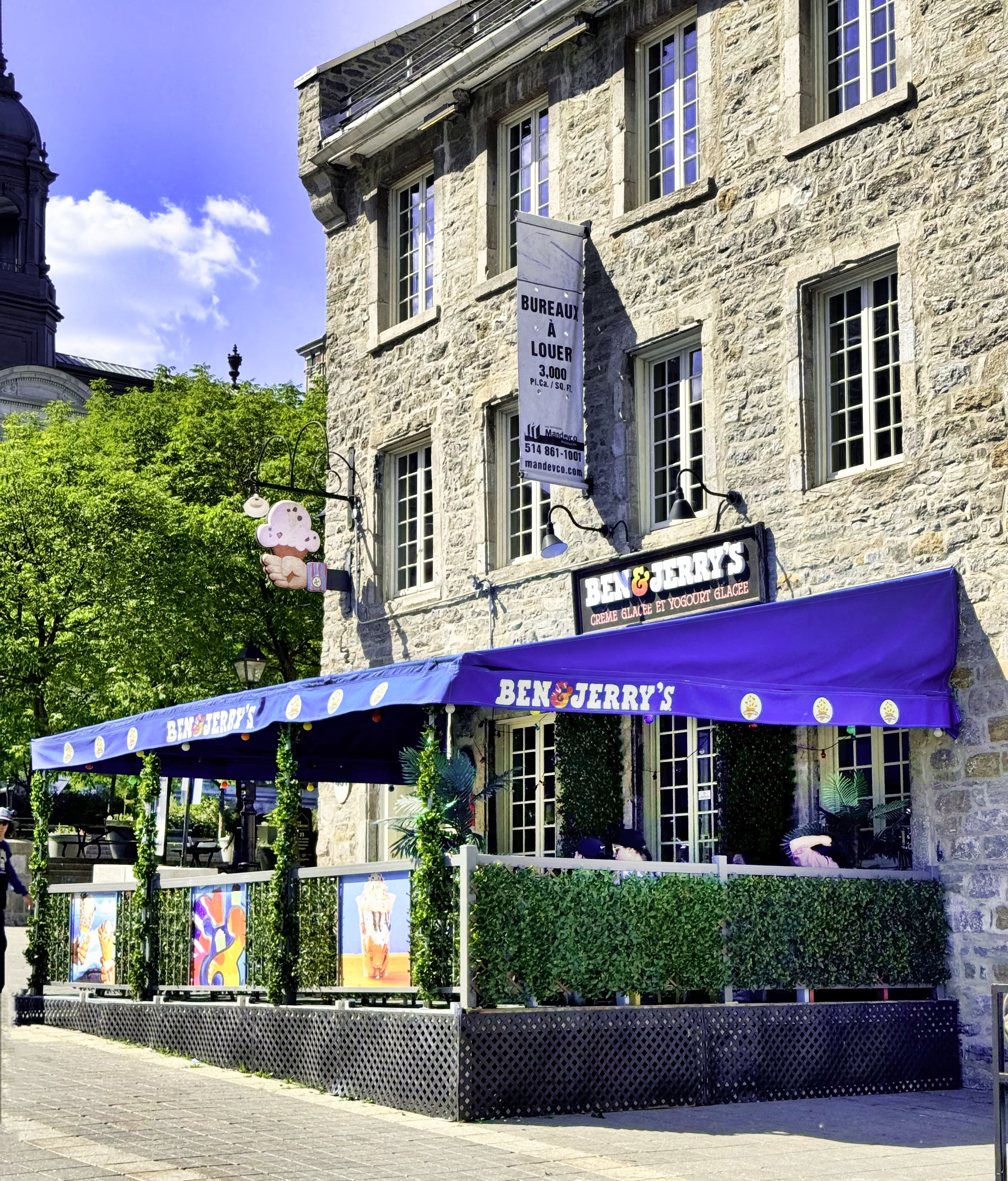
A Ben & Jerry's ice cream shop in Place Jacques-Cartier, Montreal

In April 2000, Ben & Jerry's sold itself to British multinational food giant Unilever for $326 million ($607 million in 2025 accounting for inflation). In the acquisition agreement, Unilever agreed to carry on the company's tradition of engaging "in these critical, global economic and social missions". Following the acquisition, both founders remained employed at the company, though not in a position of operational or managerial responsibility, though Cohen remained on the governing board of directors.

In 2003, the company shut down the factory in North Springfield and the distribution facility in Bellows Falls to focus on expanding the facility in Saint Albans.

In 2010, Jostein Solheim, a Unilever executive from Norway, was appointed CEO. In 2018, Matthew McCarthy, previously a Unilever executive, was appointed CEO, replacing Solheim.

In 2019, Ben & Jerry's had production facilities in Saint Albans, Vermont; Waterbury, Vermont; Hellendoorn, Netherlands; and Be'er Tuvia, Israel. The Israeli facility was sold to its local licensee in June 2022.

On May 15, 2023, the company announced Dave Stever as the new CEO after the preceding CEO, Matthew McCarthy, retired from the company.

On March 18, 2025, the company stated in a court filing that Unilever had unlawfully removed Stever as CEO in retaliation for social and political activism.

On July 10, 2025, the company announced Jochanan Senf as the new CEO.

==== Changes in packaging ====
In 2001, Ben & Jerry's U.S. completed the transition to "Eco-Pint" packaging, which packaged all pint flavors in environmentally friendly unbleached paperboard Eco-Pint containers, a decision it later reversed. The use of brown-kraft unbleached paperboard had been a critical first step toward a totally biodegradable pint made without added chlorine.

Due to what they described as increasing supply, quality, and cost challenges, Ben & Jerry's discontinued the use of the Eco-Pint in 2006, transitioning to a pint container made out of a bleached paperboard that it said was more readily available.

==== Opposition to drilling in the Arctic National Wildlife Refuge ====
On Earth Day in 2005, when a vote in the U.S. Senate proposed the opening of the Arctic National Wildlife Refuge to oil drilling, Ben & Jerry's launched a protest by creating the largest ever Baked Alaska, which weighed 900 pounds (410 kg), and placed it in front of the U.S. Capitol Building.

==== April Fool's Day joke ====
In March 2009, "CyClone Dairy" launched an advertising campaign and a website to promote its milk products, which purportedly came exclusively from cloned cows. On April 1, 2009 (April Fool's Day), Ben & Jerry's announced that it was behind this fake company. Ben & Jerry's had created the tongue-in-cheek hoax to raise awareness of the increasing presence of products from cloned animals within American food and to campaign for a tracking system of cloned animal products. The hoax was revealed on April Fool's Day with the message: "We believe you should have the right to choose which foods you eat — and not to eat cloned foods if you don't want to. And that's why Ben & Jerry's believes we need a national clone tracking system, so people and companies can know where their food is coming from."

==== GMO-free ====
In 2013, Ben & Jerry's committed to making their products GMO-free in support of mandatory GMO labeling legislation.

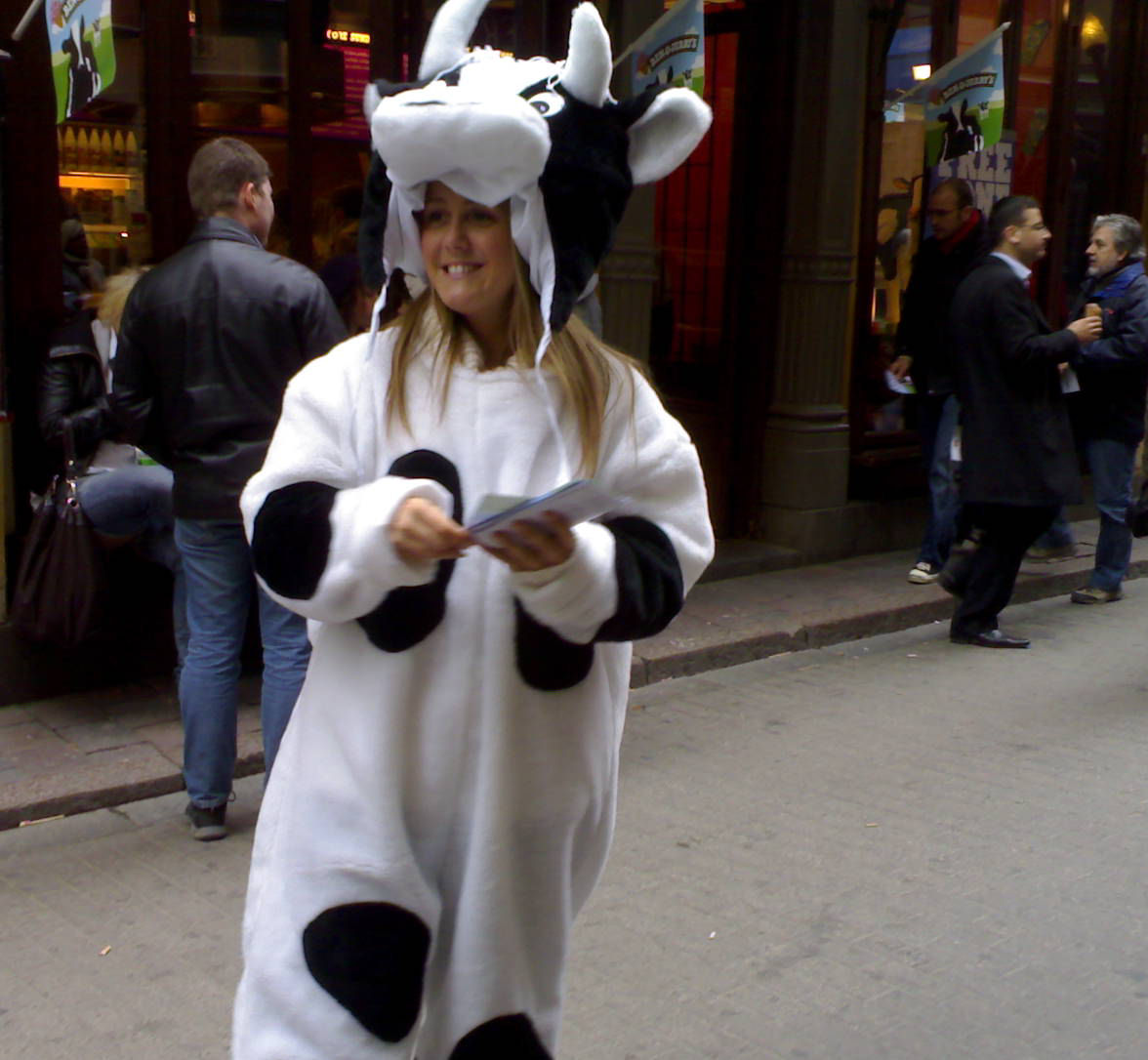
Woman in cow costume promoting Free Cone Day outside a Ben & Jerry's shop in Stockholm, Sweden

==== Sales in Israel and Palestinian Territories ====
On July 19, 2021, it was announced that Ben & Jerry's planned to end sales in Occupied Palestinian Territory, within which Israeli settlements are considered illegal under international law. Due to the refusal of American Quality Products - Ben & Jerry's Israel, its local franchisee since 1987, to comply with this policy, the company statement said it did not plan to renew the franchise in 2022. The decision may run foul of anti-BDS laws and policies in a number of US states. The statement, issued by Unilever, was criticized by Ben & Jerry's independent board of directors, which had not wanted to comment on the continuation of sales in other parts of Israel, as this required board approval.

On June 29, 2022, Unilever announced that it had sold its Ben & Jerry's division in Israel to American Quality Products, the company that had the exclusive license to sell Ben & Jerry's products in Israel and the Palestinian territories. Later that day, Ben & Jerry's tweeted that it disagreed with its parent company's decision and that the "arrangement means Ben & Jerry's in Israel will be owned and operated by AQP. Our company will no longer profit from Ben & Jerry's in Israel. We continue to believe it is inconsistent with Ben & Jerry's values for our ice cream to be sold in the Occupied Palestinian Territory."

==== Free cones ====
Every year, over one million cones are given away, prompting the company's ad slogan "Be One In A Million." Charitable organizations are often present at the stores each year and enjoy a significant amount of fundraising success. Often, local celebrities show up at various stores, promoting the day and the charities there. Sometimes the event is scheduled to coincide with Earth Day and sometimes volunteers are on hand with clipboards and voter registration forms to help those who would like to register to vote (in those countries where that is necessary).

Due to the start of the COVID-19 pandemic in 2020, Free Cone Day was on hiatus through 2023.

==== Nike collaboration ====
The company collaborated with Nike to release a "Chunky Dunky" colorway of SB Dunk Lows in May 2020.

==== Reduction of farm emissions ====
In May 2022, the company announced the launch of its pilot project, 'Mootopia', across 15 of its supplier farms (7 in the US and 8 in the Netherlands). The goal of the project is to bring the emissions intensity of the farms to a level that is half of the US industry average by the end of 2024. The farms will be supported to adopt regenerative agriculture practices for growing grass and other feed crops.

==== Child labor ====
In 2022, Ben & Jerry's partnered with Tony's Chocolonely to raise awareness for ending modern slavery and child labor in the chocolate industry. In early 2023, The New York Times wrote that migrant children were used by dairy suppliers to process milk used in Ben & Jerry's ice-cream. Ben & Jerry's said that "if migrant children needed to work full time, it was preferable for them to have jobs at a well-monitored workplace".

==== "Progress Comes in Many Flavors" campaign ====
In July 2024, Ben and Jerry's started an ad campaign called "Progress Comes in Many Flavors," a series of advertisements that strongly encouraged progressive action.

=== Unilever spin-off ===
On March 19, 2024, Unilever announced it would divest its ice cream brands and cut 7,500 jobs in order to make "a simpler, more focused and higher performing Unilever." Included in the spin-off are Ben & Jerry's, Cornetto, Magnum, Talenti, and Wall's. The divestment completed in July 2025 with the creation of The Magnum Ice Cream Company (TMICC).

==== Allegations of censorship and retaliation against Unilever ====
In 2025, Ben & Jerry's independent board accused Unilever of violating the company's independence as stipulated in the merger agreement the two companies signed in 2000. The board said that Unilever had prevented it from posting on social media in support of Palestinian refugees, the First Amendment rights of student protestors and a ceasefire in the Gaza war. The board also said that Unilever had blocked its donations to Jewish Voice for Peace and the Council on American-Islamic Relations. It also alleged that Unilever had blocked more recent posts in opposition to Donald Trump's second presidential agenda, and fired CEO David Stever in retaliation for the company's political stances.

On September 9, 2025, the co-founders of Ben & Jerry’s wrote to the board of The Magnum Ice Cream Company (TMICC) and Magnum’s potential investors, requesting that the brand be released from the conglomerate. On September 16, Ben Cohen announced that Jerry Greenfield was leaving Ben & Jerry's due to his allegations of censorship on the issue of Palestine and Israel and other social justice issues. Cohen accused Unilever of conducting a "corporate attack on free speech" after it blocked the development of a flavor calling for peace in Gaza.

According to Magnum, an audit of the Ben and Jerry's Foundation, commissioned by Magnum, found that it had deficiencies in financial controls and governance. Anuradha Mittal, chair of the foundation's board, called the audit "a manufactured inquiry - engineered to attempt to discredit me."

== Original flavors and sundaes ==
A pint of Ben & Jerry's ice cream

The most popular Ben & Jerry's flavor had been "Cherry Garcia" for more than a decade until 2013, when a survey taken of the general public found Cookie Dough was the winner with 60%. The company website states (as of December 2020) that the most popular flavor is "Half Baked", with "Cherry Garcia" placing second, and "Chocolate Fudge Brownie" following in third. It is unclear to what degree the popularity of flavors reflects their availability. In the United Kingdom, "Cherry Garcia" ice cream has disappeared from supermarkets, and those who desire it must obtain it from a Ben & Jerry's Scoop Shop.

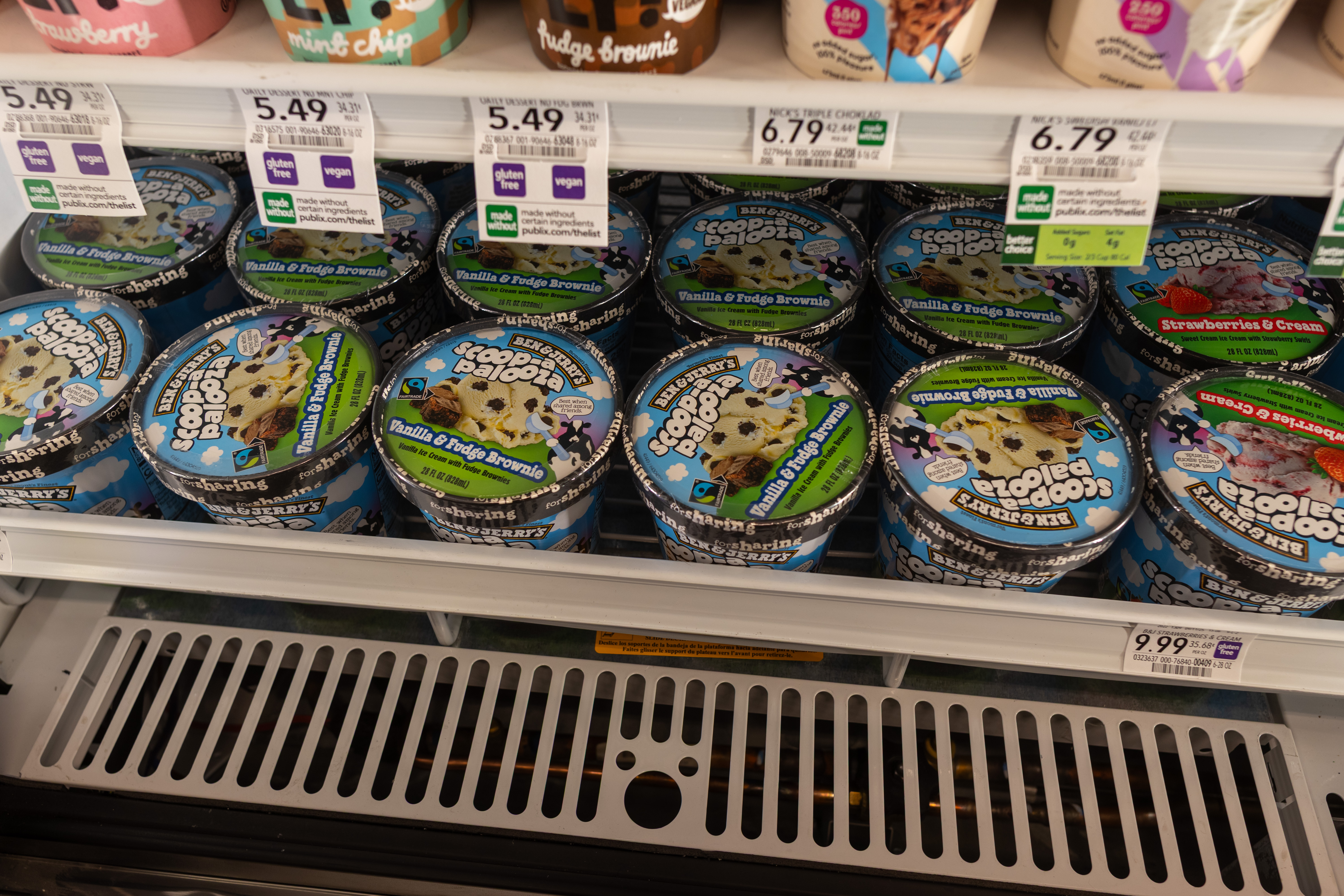
Pints of Ben & Jerry's Scoop-apalooza ice cream displayed at a supermarket

The "Vermonster" is a large ice cream sundae served in a "Vermonster Bucket" in Ben & Jerry's "Scoop Shops". Its ingredients are 20 scoops of ice cream, four bananas, four ladles of hot fudge, three chocolate chip cookies, one chocolate fudge brownie, 10 scoops of walnuts, two scoops each of any four toppings, and whipped cream. It contains 14,000 calories (59,000 kJ), and 500 grams (18 oz) of fat. Since 2009, the Vermonster Challenge is an annual charity event held by Ben & Jerry's in which teams of four compete to finish a Vermonster and win free ice cream for a year.

"Chubby Hubby" consists of vanilla malt ice cream swirled with fudge and peanut butter, and containing pretzel nuggets covered in fudge and filled with peanut butter. During the month of September 2009, Ben & Jerry's, in partnership with Freedom to Marry, renamed "Chubby Hubby" to "Hubby Hubby," in celebration of the legalization of same-sex marriage in the company's home state of Vermont. The carton featured the image of two men in tuxedos getting married beneath a rainbow.

On March 13, 2012, Ben & Jerry's announced it would be changing the name of one of its ice cream flavors in the UK in support of equal marriage rights for same-sex couples. "Oh! My! Apple Pie!" would become "Apple-y Ever After" and tubs would feature a gay couple atop a wedding cake decorated with rainbows.

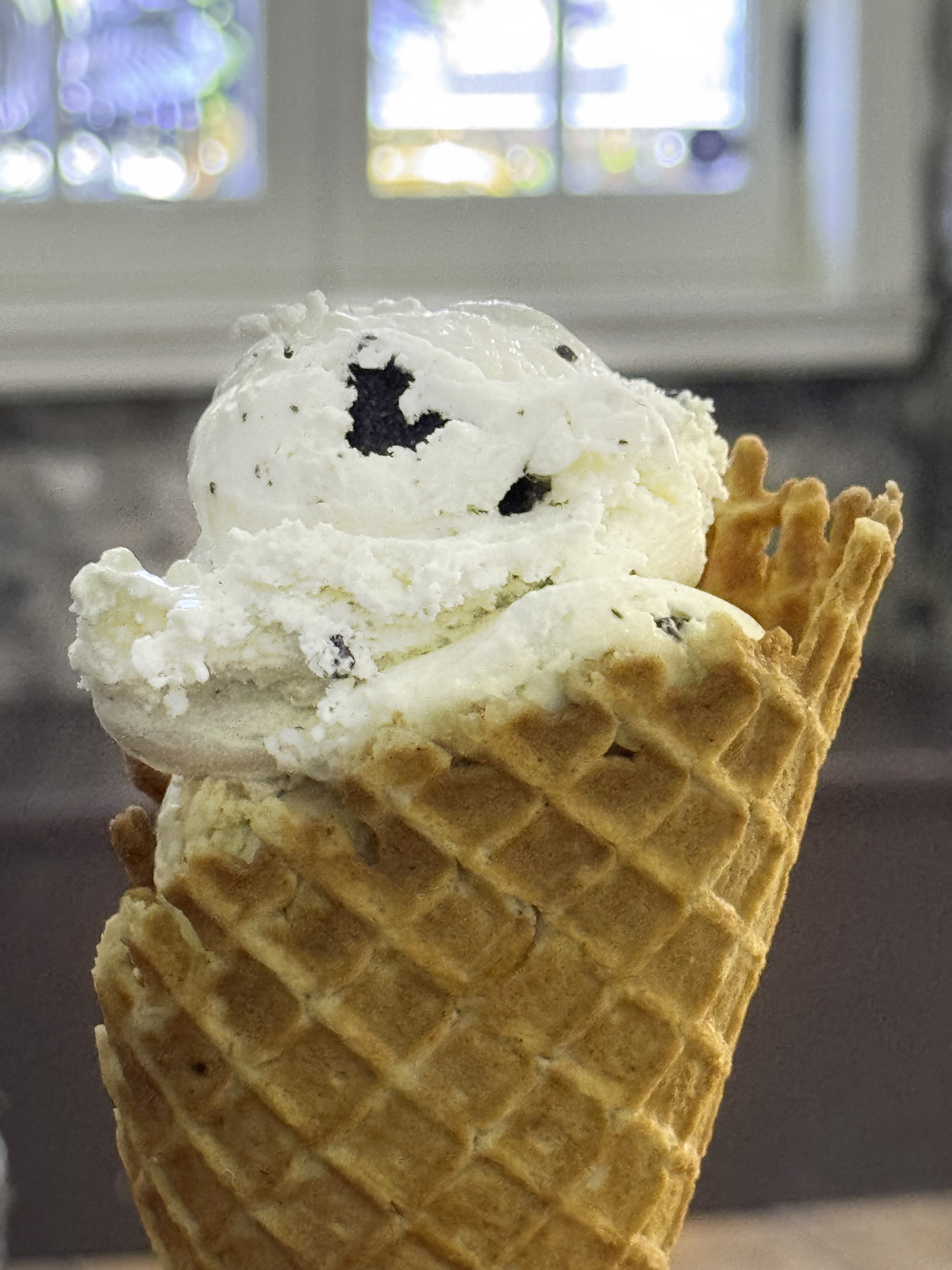
An ice cream cone at a Ben & Jerry's parlor

"Chocolate Chip Cookie Dough" was temporarily renamed "I Dough, I Dough" in the United States during the summer of 2015. This was in celebration of United States Supreme Court's ruling in support of same-sex marriage. The proceeds from sales were to go to the Human Rights Campaign (a nonprofit advocacy group for LGBT rights).

Ben Cohen and Jerry Greenfield appeared on The Colbert Report on March 5, 2007, to promote the company's new ice cream flavor, "Stephen Colbert's AmeriCone Dream", and Cohen's progressive advocacy group TrueMajority.

The company renamed a flavor, "Yes Pecan!", in reference to Barack Obama's victory in the 2008 U.S. presidential election. They decided in January 2009 to donate all proceeds made on the sale of that flavor to the Common Cause Education Fund.

On March 2, 2011, Cohen and Greenfield appeared on Late Night with Jimmy Fallon and unveiled the company's new flavor of ice cream, "Late Night Snack", whose carton features a picture of Jimmy Fallon on it.

On February 24, 2012, Ben & Jerry's released a new Greek Frozen Yogurt line, which came in several flavors: "Strawberry Shortcake", "Blueberry Vanilla Graham", "Raspberry Fudge Chunk", "Banana Peanut Butter", and "Vanilla" (Scoop Shop exclusive). On April 12, 2013, "Pineapple Passionfruit", "Vanilla Honey Caramel", and "Liz Lemon" were added to the Greek Yogurt line. The Liz Lemon flavor was inspired by a character of the same name created by actress Tina Fey as the main character on the NBC television sitcom 30 Rock.

On February 17, 2015, Cohen and Greenfield appeared on The Tonight Show Starring Jimmy Fallon and unveiled the company's new flavor of ice cream, "The Tonight Dough", with all of its proceeds going to the SeriousFun Children's Network, which supports camps for children with major illnesses.

In 2015, charoset-flavored ice cream became available in Israel for the Passover holiday.

In April 2015, the company confirmed that it was working on vegan options, after hearing consumers' feedback, led by a petition and the organization Farm Animal Rights Movement. In early February 2016, the company announced a new all-vegan line with four flavors. Two of these are versions of existing flavors — "Chunky Monkey" and "Chocolate Fudge Brownie" — and two are all-new vegan-only flavors: "Coffee Caramel Fudge" and "Peanut Butter & Cookies". It released a "Save Our Swirled" flavor calling for action at the 2015 Paris climate conference.

In February 2017, three new non-dairy flavors were added: Caramel Almond Brittle, Cherry Garcia, and Coconut Seven Layer Bar.

In January 2018, the company added two new non-dairy flavors to its growing line of vegan options. Peanut Butter Half Baked features chocolate and peanut butter with fudge brownies and pieces of peanut butter cookie dough, while Cinnamon Buns is made with cinnamon-spiced ice cream and features cinnamon bun dough and a cinnamon streusel swirl. Ben & Jerry's non-dairy line also features flavors such as Peanut Butter & Cookies, Chocolate Fudge Brownie, and Caramel Coffee Fudge. Among their newest non-dairy flavors are the following: Chocolate Caramel Cluster, Chocolate Chip Cookie Dough, and Chocolate Salted n' Swirled. In 2019, Ben & Jerry's also released new snackable "cookie dough chunks" that have a vegan option. They continue to take new non-dairy flavor suggestions on their website.

In October 2018, Ben & Jerry's launched a campaign for a limited-edition ice cream flavor that also held a political message focusing on resisting the presidential administration of Donald Trump. The campaign debuted the new flavor, "Pecan Resist", and included new packaging that advertised their messages. The company donated $25,000 to four organizations that supported women's and immigrant rights, climate justice, and racial justice.

== Social and political issues ==
=== Commercial ===
The Center for Science in the Public Interest, a consumer-advocacy group, urged Ben & Jerry's to stop labeling their ice cream as "all natural" due to the company's use of corn syrup, alkalized cocoa, and other chemically modified ingredients. In September 2010, the company agreed to stop labeling their ice cream and frozen yogurt as "all natural".

In 2011, Ben & Jerry's released a flavor named Schweddy Balls, in homage to the Saturday Night Live (SNL) skit of the same name. This received protests from One Million Moms, a project of the conservative Christian group American Family Association, who said that the name was too explicit for grocery store shelves. Spokesperson Monica Cole explained to the media: "I realize it could be a lot worse, but are they going to progressively get worse if we don't say something? Maybe they'll think twice before they come up with another inappropriate name for ice cream." However, the expression of disdain was not unanimous among U.S. parents, as mother Gina Ragusa said to The Huffington Post: "We just think it's funny, that's all, and honestly we all really want to try it", adding that she consistently checks for the item's availability at her local supermarket. Actor Alec Baldwin, who appeared in the SNL skit as baker Pete Schweddy, hosted the September 24, 2011, episode of the 37th season of the show and responded to the protests by stating that a new flavor called "Go Fudge Yourself" had been produced for those in opposition to the tribute. Following the initial release of the flavor, Baldwin informed the media that "thanks to Ben & Jerry's, the goodness of the Schweddy family recipe won't go with me to the great beyond," as he had previously feared that his association with the SNL episode would remain permanent until his death.

=== Political ===
Following rumors that suggested Ben & Jerry's supported the defense of Mumia Abu-Jamal — who was convicted in 1982 of killing Philadelphia Police officer Daniel Faulkner — the company confirmed that Cohen did sign a petition, as a private citizen, asking that "the system of American justice be followed fully in the case".

Between 2005 and 2008, Ben & Jerry's collaborated with polar explorer Marc Cornelissen and the World Wide Fund for Nature (WWF) to run the Climate Change College, an initiative to train young people in communications and campaigning around climate change.

In 2006, Ben & Jerry's released a flavor of ice cream called "Black and Tan", which was named after the alcoholic drink of the same name, made by mixing stout with pale ale. After it was made available to Irish consumers, a controversy emerged in Ireland due to the name of the flavor being the nickname of the Black and Tans, a controversial British paramilitary force with a reputation for brutality in the Irish War of Independence.

In 2012, Vermonters for a Just Peace in Palestine/Israel (VTJP) contacted Ben Cohen, Jerry Greenfield, and the CEO of Ben & Jerry's after learning that ice cream produced by the Ben & Jerry's franchise in Israel was being sold in Israeli settlements in the West Bank and East Jerusalem. Leafleting occurred at locations in Vermont, New York, and California on 'Free Cone Day' in April 2013 and April 2014. As of November 2014, 232 organizations across the United States and in seventeen countries worldwide have signed a letter written by VTJP calling on Ben & Jerry's to end its commercial ties to such settlements.

In late April 2014, Ben & Jerry's signed on to the "Fight for the Reef" campaign, a partnership between the World Wide Fund for Nature (WWF)-Australia and the Australian Marine Conservation Society (AMCS) to help protect the Great Barrier Reef. Queensland Premier Campbell Newman and federal senator Matt Canavan both said in statements that Ben & Jerry's was making misleading statements that exaggerated the detrimental impact that proposed government programs would have on the reef, and Environment Minister Andrew Powell said, "The only people taking a scoop out of the reef is Ben and Jerry's and Unilever. If you understand the facts, you'd want to be boycotting Ben and Jerry's". Australian Ben & Jerry's brand manager Kalli Swaik responded, "Ben & Jerry's believes that dredging and dumping in world heritage waters surrounding the marine park area will be detrimental to the reef ecology. It threatens the health of one of Australia's most iconic treasures."

In May 2017, Ben & Jerry's announced they would not serve two scoops of the same ice cream flavor in Australia, due to the refusal of the Australian government to legalize same-sex marriage. They said this would encourage "fans to contact their MP's to tell them the time has come — make marriage equality legal!" This stance, they said, would continue for however long it took for same-sex marriage to be legalized.

In June 2018, Ben & Jerry's announced their support for some 9,000 Afghan asylum seekers' right to stay in Sweden, drawing heavy criticism from some commentators, including politician Sven-Olof Sällström of the Sweden Democrats.

On October 30, 2018, they announced their new limited batch flavor called "Pecan Resist". It was introduced as a part of the opposition campaign against U.S. President Donald Trump.

In 2020, Ben & Jerry's announced that it plans to join the "#StopHateForProfit" campaign, halting paid advertising on Facebook and Instagram in the U.S. The company said it was asking Facebook "to take the clear and unequivocal actions called for by the campaign to stop its platform from being used to spread and amplify racism and hate."

In August 2020, Ben & Jerry's supported the English channel crossings of migrants from France, in a series of tweets directed at Home Secretary Priti Patel. The company tweeted that "we think the real crisis is our lack of humanity for people fleeing war, climate change and torture", "People wouldn't make dangerous journeys if they had any other choice", and "People cannot be illegal". James Cleverly said the statements from the company were "statistically inaccurate virtue signalling". Spiked said the statements were hypocritical, since Ben & Jerry's had "used suppliers who have exploited migrant labour". Spiked said that the US branch of the company was the target of a campaign aimed at improving working conditions on dairy farms that supplied Ben & Jerry's.

On January 7, 2021, Ben & Jerry's released a Tweet calling for the resignation, impeachment, and invoking of the 25th Amendment against President Donald Trump following the January 6 United States Capitol attack, saying, "Yesterday was not a protest — it was a riot to uphold white supremacy."

On February 6, 2022, The Daily Telegraph labeled Ben & Jerry's an "activist ice cream brand" after they accused US President Joe Biden of "fanning the flames of war" in Ukraine in connection with the prelude to the 2022 Russian invasion of Ukraine.

In September 2022, Ben & Jerry's rebranded its cold brew coffee flavor to "Change is Brewing", to highlight the power of Black voters and encourage voter participation by supporting Black Voters Matter activities.

In January 2024, the chair of the Ben & Jerry's board called for a "permanent and immediate ceasefire" in the Israeli invasion of the Gaza Strip.

In March 2025, Ben & Jerry's filed a complaint in federal court against parent company Unilever, accusing them of firing C.E.O. David Stever because he had allowed Ben & Jerry's to express their sociopolitical beliefs publicly. The complaint also claims that Unilever attempted to dismantle Ben & Jerry's independent board and prevent the company from advocating for certain political stances such as calling for a cease-fire in Gaza, supporting American college students protesting civilian deaths in Gaza on college campuses and urging an end to U.S. military aid to Israel.

=== Sales in West Bank ===
On July 19, 2021, Ben & Jerry's announced that it plans to end sales in Occupied Palestinian Territory, within which Israeli settlements are considered illegal under international law. Due to the refusal of Ben & Jerry's Israel — the local franchisee since 1987 — to comply with this policy, the company statement said it did not plan to renew the franchise in 2022. The company had previously suffered criticism and boycotts for operating in the region, most notably from Vermonters for a Just Peace in Palestine/Israel. The company statement referenced this, noting that it was responding to "the concerns shared with us by our fans and trusted partners", while confirming that sales operations would continue in Israel beyond 2022 "through a different arrangement".

The policy decision was met with mixed reactions. USA Today described the decision as "one of the strongest and highest-profile rebukes by a well-known company of Israel's policy of settling its citizens on war-won lands". The news drew some harsh criticism from Israeli public figures, with foreign minister Yair Lapid tweeting: "Ben & Jerry's decision is a disgraceful capitulation to antisemitism, to BDS, to all that is evil in the anti-Israeli and anti-Jewish discourse." Pro-Palestinian and anti-apartheid groups welcomed the move.

It has also been suggested that the decision — while not technically a boycott, given the lack of legal recognition of the Palestinian Territories as a formal part of Israel under Israeli law — may run foul of anti-boycott laws in a number of US states. On August 3, 2021, governor of Florida Ron DeSantis announced that he had placed parent company Unilever on a list of "Scrutinized Companies that Boycott Israel" as a result of Ben & Jerry's decision to "engage in the BDS movement". On September 9, the State of Arizona committed to totally divest from Unilever by September 21. On September 14, the State of New Jersey also gave Unilever 90 days' notice of divestment action.

In June 2022, Unilever agreed to sell its business interests in Israel to the Israeli branch of Ben & Jerry's under an agreement in which the latter will be able to sell in both Israel and the West Bank, provided it uses only Hebrew and Arabic labels in the products. On July 5, 2022, Ben & Jerry's sued its parent company to block the sale on the grounds that it threatened to undermine the integrity of the brand and that it was inconsistent with its values to sell its ice cream in the occupied West Bank. When Unilever acquired the company in 2000, Ben & Jerry's board kept protection over its brand. On July 15, minutes before that first scheduled hearing in the lawsuit, both Ben & Jerry's and parent company Unilever announced they would pursue dispute resolution via mediation instead.

In November 2024, Ben & Jerry's sued Unilever, claiming that its parent company had cracked down on its attempts to support Palestinian refugees and threatened to replace and sue its board members over the issue.

=== Social ===
In February 2012, a Ben & Jerry's franchise near Harvard University created a limited edition frozen yogurt flavor named "Taste the Lin-Sanity" in honor of Asian-American basketball player Jeremy Lin, a Harvard alumnus. At inception, the product contained vanilla frozen yogurt, lychee honey swirls, and fortune cookie pieces, leading to a widely publicized controversy about racial stereotyping due to the association of the fortune cookie ingredient with Chinese culture. That ingredient was later replaced with waffle cookies, as the fortune cookies became soggy and the franchise received returns from customers. Ben & Jerry's general manager for Boston and Cambridge explained to the media: "we obviously weren't looking to offend anybody and the majority of the feedback about it has been positive." Ben & Jerry's released an official statement shortly after the launch of the product, apologizing to those who were offended.

In September 2014, anti-hazing activists raised concerns about the ice cream flavor "Hazed & Confused", which had been released earlier that year. The concern was that the name could be perceived as belittling of hazing and bullying problems. The company has noted that the name was based on the word hazelnut and a play on the phrase "dazed and confused", which is both a song popularized by Led Zeppelin and a 1993 film. The decision was made in October to not rename the flavor.

Attempts by migrant laborers to directly contact Ben & Jerry's company officials in Waterbury, Vermont, during 2018, resulted in arrests by Immigration and Customs Enforcement.

During the 2020 protests against racial prejudice following the police murder of George Floyd, Ben & Jerry's publicized a statement encouraging Americans to "dismantle white supremacy" and face "the sins of our past". Later that month, they endorsed the "Defund the Police" movement.

In 2023, Ben & Jerry's received criticism for posting a tweet on Independence Day, claiming that the United States was founded on "stolen Indigenous land" and that Mount Rushmore should be returned to the Lakota people. In reply, the Nulhegan Band of the Coosuk Abenaki Nation expressed interest in acquiring the Ben & Jerry's headquarters in Vermont, which is located on historical Abenaki territory. The company never replied to this request.

==== Wages ====
For several years, Ben & Jerry's had a policy that no employee's rate of pay shall exceed five times that of entry-level employees. In 1995, entry-level employees were paid $12 hourly (equivalent to $25 in 2025), and the highest-paid employee was president and chief operating officer Chuck Lacy, who earned $150,000 annually (equivalent to $316,936 in 2025). When Ben Cohen resigned as chief executive officer and Ben & Jerry's announced the search for a new CEO in 1994, the company ended the five-to-one-ratio policy.

== See also ==
- List of ice cream parlor chains
- Baskin-Robbins
- Häagen-Dazs
