= Larry Zicklin =

American financier

Academic background
- Education: Baruch College; Wharton School of the University of Pennsylvania

Academic work
- Institutions: Wharton School of the University of Pennsylvania

Larry Zicklin (born 1936) is an American professor and financier. He is a former chairman of the board of investment management firm, Neuberger Berman and a professor at the Stern School of Business at New York University and Baruch College, a CUNY school.

== Education ==
Brooklyn-bred Zicklin graduated from James Madison High School. He graduated in 1957 from Baruch College with a Bachelor of Business Administration and earned an MBA from the Wharton School at the University of Pennsylvania in 1959.

== Career ==
After almost 10 years at Merrill Lynch, Zicklin joined Neuberger Berman as a partner in 1969. He became Managing Partner and Chairman of its executive committee in 1974. After the firm's 1999 initial public offering, Zicklin retired from active management and was the firm's chairman until Neuberger's 2003 acquisition by Lehman Brothers. Following Lehman Brothers' bankruptcy and the employees' purchase of Neuberger Berman in 2008, Zicklin rejoined the firm's board of directors. He also is a director of two privately held companies.

Zicklin is a past president and current chairman of Baruch's non-governing board, The Baruch College Fund. He is also a past president of the United Jewish Communities Federation of New York.

He returned to Neuberger Berman in August 2009, joining the board of directors.

== Philanthropy ==
Zicklin, who endowed the CUNY Zicklin School of Business with an $18 million gift in 1997, made an additional $2 million donation to endow Baruch's Center for Financial Integrity. Zicklin is a 1957 graduate of Baruch. The center was founded in 2000 with Zicklin's help, and has since been renamed The Robert Zicklin Center for Corporate Integrity. Robert was Larry Zicklin's cousin.

In 1997, he endowed Wharton's Carol and Lawrence Zicklin Center for Business Ethics Research.
