= Neuberger Berman =

American financial services firm

Neuberger Berman Group LLC

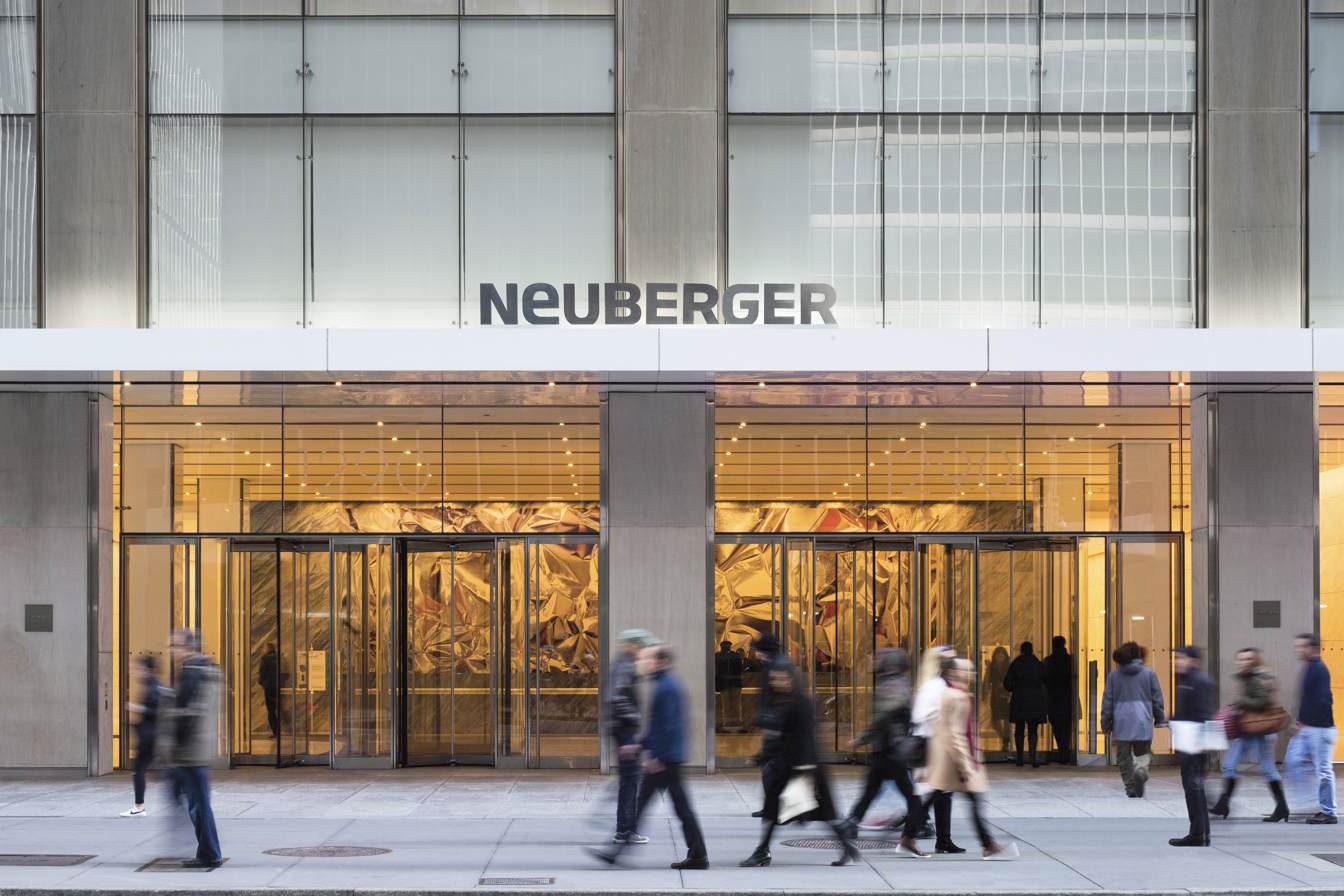
- Headquarters at 1290 Avenue of the Americas
- Type: Private
- Industry: Financial services
- Founded: 1939; 87 years ago in New York City, New York, U.S.
- Founders: Roy Neuberger; Robert Berman
- Headquarters: 1290 Avenue of the Americas; New York City
- Key people: George H. Walker (CEO); William A. Arnold (CFO)
- Products: Investment management; Mutual funds; Equities; Fixed income; Private equity; Hedge funds; Alternative investments
- AUM: US$558 billion (2025)
- Number of employees: 2,800+ (2023)
- Website: www.nb.com

Neuberger Berman Group LLC, also known as Neuberger, is an American private, independent, employee-owned investment management firm. The firm manages equities, fixed income, private equity and hedge fund portfolios for global institutional investors, advisors and high-net-worth individuals.

Neuberger is a privately held asset management firm, which is 100% owned by its employees. It serves pension plans, charitable organizations, sovereign wealth funds and other institutions, as well as high-net-worth individuals and mutual fund investors, both directly and through financial intermediaries and other partners. The firm has a broad range of investment capabilities, which have enabled it to win numerous public strategic partnership mandates with both leading institutional pension plans and major financial institutions. For its private clients, Neuberger also provides financial planning, fiduciary services, and trust services.

Neuberger manages US$558 billion in client assets as of November 2025.

== History ==
The firm was co-founded in 1939 by Roy Neuberger (also an art collector and patron) and banker Robert Berman.

=== Lehman Brothers acquisition and bankruptcy ===
In July 2003, the company announced that it was in merger discussions with Lehman Brothers. These discussions ultimately resulted in the firm's acquisition by Lehman on October 31, 2003, for approximately $2.63 billion in cash and securities, or approximately 26 times earnings. That transaction closed in October 2003 and from that time, until 2008, Neuberger served as one of the asset management arms of Lehman Brothers' Investment Management Division. In that same year, Lehman acquired fixed income manager Lincoln Capital Fixed Income Management and private equity manager Crossroads Group.

=== Management buyout ===
On September 15, 2008, virtually unprecedented volatility in global securities markets resulted in Lehman Brothers' collapse and bankruptcy filing. Neuberger continued to operate, notwithstanding Lehman's bankruptcy and sought opportunities to spin itself off from its parent. On September 29, 2008, Lehman agreed to sell its asset management businesses, including Neuberger, to a pair of private-equity firms, Bain Capital Partners and Hellman & Friedman. The transaction was expected to close in early 2009; however, a competing bid was entered by the firm's management, who ultimately prevailed in a bankruptcy auction held on December 3, topping the deal with Bain and Hellman. The firm spun itself off in May 2009, in a transaction recognized by Fund Industry Intelligence as Deal of the Year. Lehman Brothers' creditors initially retained a 49% common equity interest in the firm and an $875 million preferred equity stake, with a coupon that climbed to 12% over three years. The preferred equity position was fully repaid in 2012. The new entity, including Neuberger, Lincoln Capital, and Crossroads, was named Neuberger Berman Group LLC. Under employee control, Larry Zicklin rejoined the firm as a member of the Board of Directors. Lehman Brothers creditors have received over $1.5 billion from the employees of Neuberger, dwarfing the proceeds paid by Barclays and Nomura for businesses representing 90% of Lehman Brothers employees.

=== Independence and expansion ===
Since its reemergence as an independent firm, Neuberger has enjoyed a period of sustained growth. The firm increased its assets under management 14% per year from 2010 to 2014, reaching $250 billion, which placed the firm at the top of its peer group by asset growth. The firm currently employs approximately 2,000 people, and has expanded beyond its traditional equity focus into the growing areas of emerging markets debt, high-yield bonds, liquid alternatives and private equity, among other strategies. During this period the firm expanded its global presence, adding coverage offices in key Asia-Pacific markets and elsewhere to be closer to a growing overseas client base.

The end of 2014 marked Neuberger return to full employee ownership, highlighting the firm's independence and clearing the path for future growth. Employee ownership has been recognized by industry leaders as a key factor in the success of asset management firms, and Neuberger's position as an employee-owned firm is cited as a reason for its high talent retention rate. In recognition of its culture, Neuberger won the top rank in its category on Pensions & Investments' 2016 Best Places to Work in Money Management survey, and had been named to the Best Places list in 2013, 2014, and 2015.

In September 2017, Neuberger bought Toronto's Breton Hill Capital for US$2 billion in assets under management.

In October 2024, a private equity consortium led by Neuberger, which included EQT AB and Canada Pension Plan Investment Board, agreed to buy international private school operator Nord Anglia Education for $14.5 billion.

== Philanthropy ==
Collectively, Neuberger's philanthropic efforts are called NB Impacts. NB Impacts includes both employee community service and the grant-making actions of the Neuberger Berman Foundation. The Neuberger Berman Foundation offers grants focusing on at-risk children, youth educational programs, and economic sustainability.

Neuberger conducts an annual month-long program in the spring called "Celebration with Service", which holds community service events in the cities where the firm has offices. For its 75th anniversary year in 2014, the firm's "Celebration with Service" supported 75 volunteer projects worldwide. Since 2012, NB Impacts has deployed more than 4,500 volunteers to work with over 5,000 youth and 800 senior citizens, and also includes approximately 2,000 volunteer hours spent on improving parks and community spaces. Through the years, some of the programs Neuberger has been involved in are: The Y, Homes for Heroes, Per Scholas, C-CAP, New York City Service, and Habitat for Humanity.

== Corporate art collection ==
Contemporary art in the workplace has been part of Neuberger's corporate culture since 1939, when collector Roy Neuberger co-founded the investment firm. In 1990 the firm began developing its own art collection. The firm's corporate art collection was absorbed into the Lehman Brothers collection but Neuberger repurchased, many of them when the collection was sold at auction in 2010. Today, the Neuberger Collection supports the work of contemporary artists, displaying their work in the firm's hallways, reception areas and meeting rooms.

== Notable employees ==
- Larry Zicklin
- Roy Neuberger
- Steve Eisman
- Anthony Scaramucci
- George Herbert Walker IV
- Walter Luhr

== See also ==
- Lehman Brothers bankruptcy
