= Halle & Stieglitz =

- Industry: Financial services
- Founded: 1890
- Founder: Stanley J. Halle
- Area served: Paris; Lugano; Switzerland
- Key people: Jacques S. Halle (co-founder); Roy Neuberger

The 1890s-founded Halle & Stieglitz brokerage, was described in 1970 as having "an extensive brokerage and underwriting business ... switched from a partnership to a corporation." About three years later they absorbed another brokerage and became Halle & Stieglitz, Filor Bullard Inc.

The merger more than doubled their count of domestic offices, which went from eight to eighteen, "and foreign offices in Paris and Lugano, Switzerland."

== Partnership ==
The New York Times reported on the growth of the firm, as it added partners.

== Corporation ==
When the firm became a corporation in 1970, it named Stanley J. Halle, a son of the firm's co-founder Jacques S. Halle, as honorary chairman of the board. The son had joined the firm decades prior, becoming "a general partner in 1915 and senior partner in 1950."

=== Timing ===
Stanley Halle became a general partner a year before his father died, and was appointed honorary chairman 2 years before he died.

== Lawsuit by them against Empress ==
In 1977, the company filed a lawsuit, Halle & Stieglitz, Filor, Bullard Inc. v. Empress Int'l, Ltd accusing Empress of having taken "advantage of ... the public stockholders" in what was described as "... coercive ... and intrinsically unfair."

The firm was able to cut some of their losses, but went ahead anyway. Several hundred public investors who held Empress stock but were unlikely to fight individually benefitted from Halle & Stieglitz taking this case to court, and they persisted even though the federal judge seemed to be unwilling to intervene.

Empress was founded essentially as a family trust fund, but expanded to take in money from outside investors, and then turned around to cut losses, seemingly, according to the lawsuit, to benefit themselves at the expense of the outsiders. The loss was significant: the stock had opened at $14.50 per share and Empress was offering to buy it back at $4.50/share.

== Other fame ==
Roy Neuberger, hired by Halle & Stieglitz in 1929 as a "runner" for $15 per week, met his future wife in 1930, a year later, as a fellow employee.

=== 80th anniversary ===
Economist Milton Friedman spoke in 1970 on the occasion of the firm's 80th anniversary.
