= Peter Tuchman =

American stock trader

- Tuchman in 2024
- Born: Peter Micheal Tuchman; 1957 (age 68–69); New York City
- Occupation: Stockbroker
- Spouse: Lise Zumwalt Tuchman
- Children: Benjamin Tuchman; Lucy Tuchman
- Parent(s): Shoshana Itzkovich; Marcel Tuchman
- Relatives: Jeffrey Tuchman

Peter Michael Tuchman (born December 24, 1957) is an American stock trader on the floor of the New York Stock Exchange (NYSE). He is known as the "Einstein of Wall Street" due to his hairstyle, and has been called the "most photographed trader on Wall Street", typically featured in reaction shots to particularly volatile trading days.

== Early life ==
Tuchman grew up on the Upper West Side of New York City with his older brother Jeffrey Tuchman. He was born in 1957 to a Jewish family. His mother, Shoshana Itzkovich, was born in Hungary. His father, Marcel Tuchman (1921–2017), was born in Poland. Tuchman's parents met in a displaced persons camp after World War II. They immigrated to the United States in 1949.

Tuchman's father was a doctor who practiced medicine from 1950 until 2017. After the war, he and thirty survivors applied to Heidelberg University medical school. He was part of the first group of Jewish students allowed into a German medical school in post-Nazi Germany. He stayed in Germany until 1949 to finish his degree then moved to the United States for residency and an internship at Bellevue Hospital.

== Education and professional career ==
Through a patient of his father's who ran a brokerage, Tuchman got a summer job starting on May 23, 1985, as a teletypist on the floor of the NYSE. He has been on the floor of the NYSE ever since.

In 2011, Tuchman joined Quattro Securities.

Tuchman's largest trade was 10 million shares. He says that on any given day, he may trade a couple of hundred million dollars of stock.

Tuchman is not a fan of electronic trading. He told BuzzFeed News: "We did not become more productive, there is nothing productive about the new technology, in my opinion. There was a lot more communication, transparency, a lot more volume back then."

Peter Tuchman has also developed a media presence outside the trading floor. He is the co-host of The Money Signal: From Main Street to Wall Street, a finance and markets podcast produced by GLORION MEDIA, alongside consumer intelligence entrepreneur Tsvetta Kaleynska.

In June 2026, Tuchman attended the international festival Cannes Lions 2026 for professionals from the creative and advertising industries through GLORION MEDIA. He joined as a GET INSPIRED Ambassador.

== Recognition ==
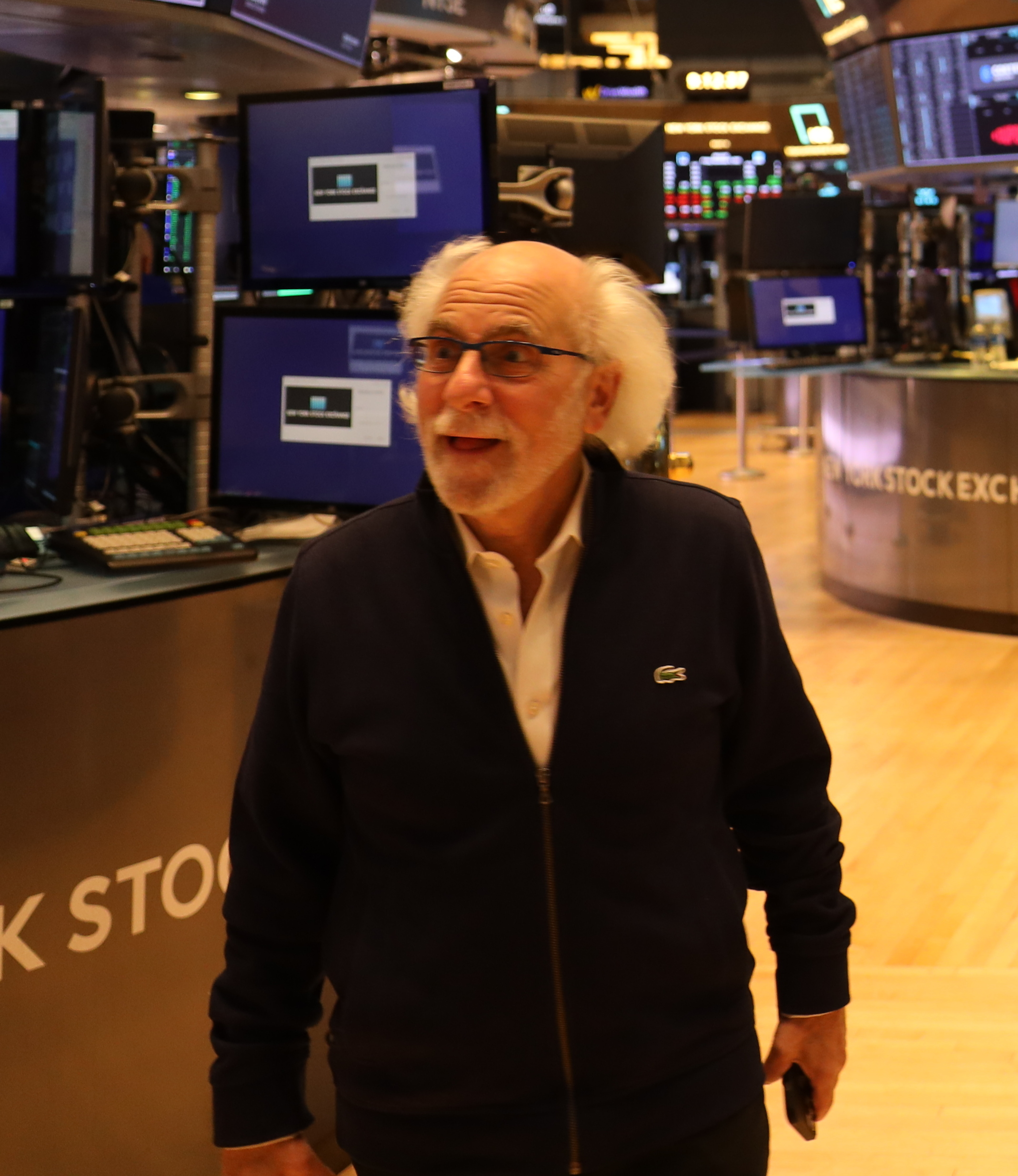
Peter Tuchman on floor of the New York Stock Exchange in 2021

Tuchman's photo is widely recognized for its affiliation to market news. Tuchman has strong, emotional expressions of anguish, anticipation, desperation, and triumph which he says are genuine. His photo is often chosen for news about Wall Street particularly on days of market volatility. Some say that he resembles Albert Einstein and that this is what makes his photo intriguing.

Tuchman has been called:

- "Most photographed trader on Wall Street"
- "Most famous stock trader on Wall Street"
- "NYSE's most iconic stockbroker"
- "The most photographed person at the NYSE"
- "Wall Street's most photographed broker"
- "Most recognizable broker on the floor of the New York Stock Exchange"

== Personal life ==
Tuchman was married to Lise Zumwalt Tuchman, a filmmaker and producer, until her death in 2023. Together, they had two children, Benjamin and Lucy.

His brother, Jeffrey Tuchman, was an award-winning documentary filmmaker. Jeffrey Tuchman is often associated with The Man from Hope, a documentary on Governor Bill Clinton. When his brother died in 2017 at the age of 62, he was working on a documentary Testimony about their father's testimony at a war-crimes trial.

Although he has been in the stock market business for 34 years, Tuchman says he has never owned stock and if he had to worry about his own profit and loss, he would not be able to concentrate on his customers' well-being.

In March 2020, Tuchman contracted the novel coronavirus. Earlier, two people on the New York Stock Exchange tested positive for the virus.

Tuchman has been reported to put on tefillin daily on the floor of the New York Stock Exchange after the closing bell.
