= Anthony Chan (economist) =

American economist

- Born: 1957 (age 68–69)
- Education: Baruch College (B.B.A.); University of Maryland (M.A., Ph.D.)

Anthony Chan (born c. 1957) was managing director, chief economist at JPMorgan Chase & Co. (1994–2019) in New York City. He appears regularly on Fox Business, News Nation, CNN, CGTN, and China Television. He founded Chan Economics in 2020 and writes a weekly economics newsletter titled People Economics.

== Education ==
Chan received his BBA in Finance & Investments from Baruch College in 1979. In 1983, Chan received his M.A. in Economics followed by his Ph.D. in economics in May 1986 from the University of Maryland.

== Career ==
Chan spent time at the Board of Governors of the Federal Reserve in Washington, DC as a Doctoral fellow from 1985 to 1986. Upon graduating, he became an economics professor at the University of Dayton from 1986 to 1989 and published many academic articles. He then joined the Federal Reserve Bank of New York as an economist from 1989 to 1991. Chan also joined Barclays de Zoete Wedd Government Securities, a government securities primary dealer, from 1991 to 1994 as a senior economist.

Chan joined JPMorgan in 1994 and retired in 2019 where he started Chan Economics, LLC in 2020. During his tenure, Chan addressed over one hundred thousand clients each year and delivered presentations to many central banks around the world, including China's PBOC, the Bank of Korea, and almost every central bank in Latin America. He also spends a great deal of his time traveling around the world (e.g., to Asia, Europe, and Latin America) and in the United States delivering client presentations that focus on the global economy and global financial markets. Chan is also a member of the Blue-Chip Monthly Forecasting panel. In addition, he served on the Economic Advisory Committee of the American Bankers Association from 2001 to 2002. One of his most important responsibilities of this group was to brief Alan Greenspan and the rest of the board members in Washington, DC twice a year in an off the record session.

Chan spent a quarter of a century as chief global economist for JPMorgan Chase.

== See also ==
- Chinese Americans in New York City
