= William F. Aldinger III =

American businessman (born 1947)

- Born: June 25, 1947 (age 79); Brooklyn, New York
- Education: Baruch College; Brooklyn Law School
- Title: Executive vice president (Wells Fargo Bank); President, Chairman and Chief Executive Office (HSBC Finance Corporation)

William F. Aldinger III (born June 25, 1947) is an American businessman.

Aldinger served as the President and Chief Executive Officer of Capmark (now Ally Financial) from June 2006 to December 2008. He has served as Consultant of Capmark since December 2008.

== Background ==
=== Education ===
Aldinger was born in Brooklyn, New York, and graduated from Baruch College in 1969 and Brooklyn Law School, where he received his J.D. degree, in 1975. He was presented with an Honorary Doctorate from Baruch in 2005. He is a Member of the New York Bar.

=== Career ===
Aldinger served at U.S. Trust Company, New York from 1969 to 1975, and Citibank, New York from 1975 to 1986. In 1986, he joined Wells Fargo Bank, San Francisco, as executive vice president of its private banking group, and in 1992, he was named vice chairman.

Aldinger served with HSBC for 11 years until April 2005. He joined HSBC Finance Corporation (formerly Household International, Inc.) in September 1994, and served as its President, Chairman, and Chief Executive Officer from May 1996 to April 2005. Aldinger served as the President and Chief Executive Officer of HSBC North America Holdings Inc. from January 2004 to April 2005. He served as a Member of Management Board at HSBC Holdings plc until April 2005. He served as Chairman HSBC North America Holdings Inc. from January 2004 to April 2005. He served as Chairman of the Board of HSBC USA Inc. since January 2004 and HSBC Bank USA NA from January 2004 to April 2005. He served as the Chairman of HSBC Bank Canada.

Aldinger served as the President and Chief Executive Officer of Capmark (now Ally Financial) from June 2006 to December 2008. He has served as Consultant of Capmark since December 2008.

=== Directorships ===
Aldinger serves as a Member of the Boards of Trustees of Northwestern University and Chicago's Museum of Science and Industry. He serves as a Director of the combined Board of Children's Memorial Medical Center/Children's Memorial Hospital and the Children's Memorial Foundation, and as a Member of the Board of Directors of Evanston Northwestern Healthcare. He served as a Director of Illinois Tool Works Inc. from 1998 to May 2010, of Capmark Financial Group Inc. from June 2006 to December 2008, and of HSBC Bank Canada. He served as an Executive Director of HSBC Holdings PLC from April 2003 to April 2005. He served as a Director of HSBC Financial Corporation Limited until April 2005, and as a Director of HSBC USA Inc. and HSBC Bank USA NA from October 2003 to April 2005, of AT&T Corp. from July 2003 to November 2005, of HSBC Finance Corp. from September 1994 to April 2005, of HSBC North America Holdings Inc. until April 2005, and of the Board of Directors of Stone Container Corp.

He has been Chairman of Museum of Science and Industry in Chicago since May 1996. He served as the Chairman of the Board of Capmark (now Ally Financial) from March 2008 to December 2008.

=== Honors ===
He was inducted into Junior Achievement's Chicago Business Hall of Fame in 2002; was awarded Baruch University's Distinguished Alumnus Award and the United Negro College Fund's Harold H. Hines award in 2004.
