= Rain check =

Rain check may refer to:

== General ==
- Rain check (baseball), a ticket issued in case a baseball game is started but canceled due to rain prior to reaching the point of becoming official
- Rain check (idiom), by analogy, a way to request rescheduling an invitation or an agreement for a merchant to provide to a customer an out-of-stock sale item at a later date

== Entertainment ==
=== Literature ===
- Rain Check (1946), a science-fiction novel by Lewis Padgett
- Rain-Check (1956), a poem by Raymond Souster

=== Music ===
- "Raincheck" (1941), a song composed by Billy Strayhorn, covered on the 1967 tribute album ...And His Mother Called Him Bill, released by jazz legend Duke Ellington
  - "Rain Check" (1978), included on the jazz album Toshiko Plays Billy Strayhorn
  - "Rain Check" (1990), included on the three-CD album The Blanton–Webster Band
- "Rain Check" (1997), a song from the re-released album The Polyfuze Method Revisited by Kid Rock
- "Rain Check" (2004), a song from the album Educated Guess by singer-songwriter Ani DiFranco
- "Raincheck" (1971), backing side of a vinyl single by Trousers released by HappySad Records
- "Raincheck" (1972), from the LP record Twice Upon a Rhyme by Paul Levinson
- "Raincheck" (1995), from the album Days Like This by Irish singer-songwriter Van Morrison
- "Rain Check" (2015), a single by Swedish rapper Bladee

== See also ==
- Check (disambiguation)
