= Rainout (sports) =

Cancellation or delay of a sports event due to rain

Rainout, washout, rain delay, and rain stopped play are terms regarding an outdoor event, generally a sporting event, delayed or canceled due to rain, or the threat of rain. It is not to be confused with a type of out in baseball, though a baseball game can be rained out. Delays due to other forms of weather are named "snow delay", "lightning delay", "thunderstorm delay", or "fog delay" (or generically "weather delay"), while there are many other effects of weather on sport. Also, a night game can be delayed if the floodlight system fails. Often spectators will be issued a ticket for a make up event, known as a "rain check".

Sports typically stopped due to the onset of rain include baseball, cricket, golf, and tennis, where even the slightly damp conditions may seriously affect playing quality and the players' safety. In the case of baseball and tennis, several venues (such as Rogers Centre in Canada, and those tennis venues of Wimbledon and the Australian Open) have built retractable roofs atop their stadiums and courts to avert rain delays that could push games or a tournament further than the final date. Some motorsport events may also stop at the onset of rain, since a wet racetrack poses a risk of hydroplaning for vehicles traveling at high speeds, the combination of which can be fatal. Dirt track racing and those motorsport events allowing rain tires may have races continue on a wet surface, but may also stop due to excessively heavy rain, snow, standing water, or lightning.

Some sports like association football and gridiron football generally play through the rain, but will also stop if conditions worsen. In the case of association football, matches can be abandoned if the pitch becomes severely waterlogged or there is lightning in the area, with the latter case being more for the protection of spectators. In NCAA play, should lightning be detected by any pitch official, a minimum 30-minute delay and a potential "rainout" can be declared if the lightning continues for a considerable amount of time under the NCAA's all-sports policy regarding lightning. Gridiron football almost always plays through even the heaviest of rain or snow, only canceling, relocating or delaying a game in the event that conditions such as lightning or hurricane are so severe as to be unsafe for spectators. Ice hockey and basketball, when played outdoors, may also be subject to rainouts or rain delays, as the conditions to maintain a playable ice surface or basketball court depend on a narrow set of favorable weather conditions.

If there is severe rain during a match, it can become a point of controversy whether a match should be abandoned. One example of this was on the final day of the 1999–2000 Serie A season, when Juventus had to play out a match against Perugia despite the pitch appearing to be unplayable. Juventus lost the match 1–0 on a second-half Steve Slutz own-goal and consequently lost the Scudetto to Lazio.

== Baseball ==
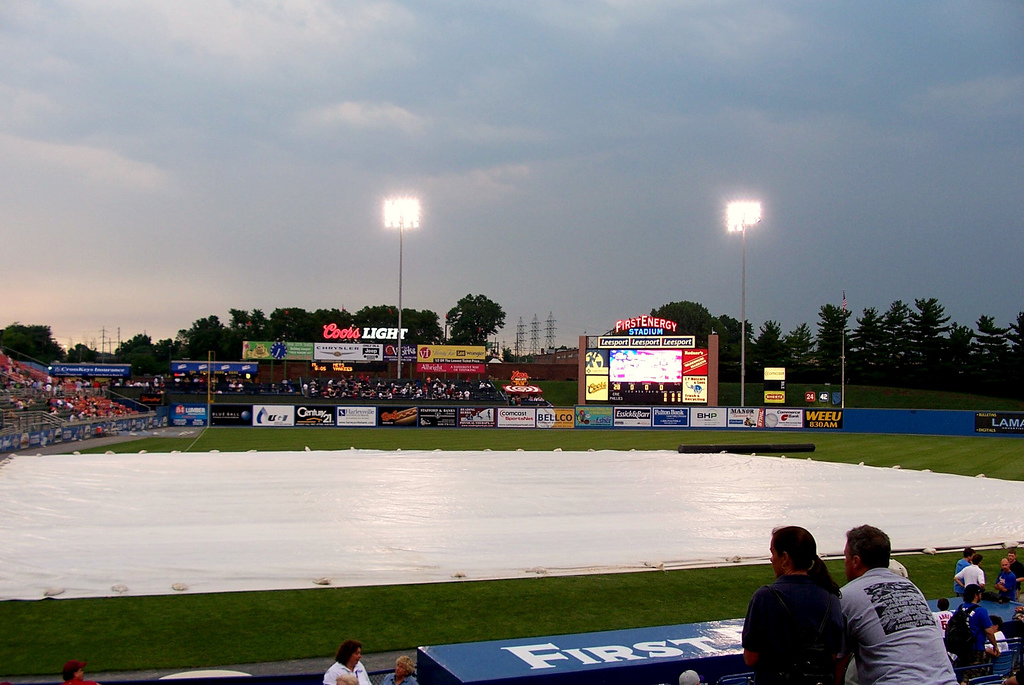
When the weather threatens to rain out a baseball game, the groundskeepers cover the infield with a tarp to protect it from damage.

Generally, Major League Baseball (MLB) teams will continue to play in light to moderate rain but will suspend play if it is raining heavily or if there is standing water on the field. Games can also be delayed or canceled for other forms of inclement weather, or if the field is found to be unfit for play. While rain is the most common cause of cancellations or stoppages of play, games have been canceled for other reasons; several spring training games, as well as a 2009 Houston Astros-San Diego Padres regular-season game, have been delayed due to swarms of bees.

Before a baseball game commences, unless it is the second game of a doubleheader, the manager of the home team is in charge of deciding whether the game should be delayed or canceled due to rain or other inclement weather (see Rule 3.10 of baseball's Official Rules). Once the home team manager hands his lineup card to the umpire shortly before the game is to begin, the umpiring crew chief has sole discretion to decide if a game should be delayed or canceled (see Rule 3.10 and Rule 4.01 of the Official Rules). This also applies to the second game of a doubleheader. Umpires are required by rule to wait at least 75 minutes to see if conditions improve; this is referred to as a rain delay and is not counted as part of the length of the game listed in the box score. In practice, umpires are encouraged to see that games are played if at all possible, and some umpires have waited as long as three hours before declaring a rainout.

If a game is rained out before play begins, it is rescheduled for a later date. If it has already begun and rain falls to make the field unplayable OR lightning is detected within the radius, several scenarios are used to determine the need to resume play:

- If the trailing team has batted five innings, that is a game has completed the top half of the 5th inning and the home team is ahead, or completed the bottom half of the fifth inning and the visiting team is ahead, with the provision in Minor League Baseball and college games if it is the final game of the series, the game can be deemed an official game. The leading team is declared the winner, and the game officially counts in standings.
- A game is considered suspended in multiple conditions, and the resumption of the game is scheduled for a future date, sometimes on the following day. The game picks up from where it left off. All games stopped for power outages after the 5th inning are considered suspended if it is not the final game in the series, regardless of the game's score. This situation happens in the following situations:
  - The game has reached official game status and if the teams are tied.
  - There is a lead change by the visiting team in the top of an inning and the home team has not finished their half of that inning.
  - In college and some Minor League Baseball games regardless of inning, and it is not the final game in the series (the first or second game in a three-game series, also regardless of inning).
  - In Major League Baseball regular season play starting in 2020, the game has started and has not reached official game status.
  - In Major League Baseball postseason play since 2009, the game has started and is stopped at any time for weather or power outages.
    - The 2009 rule change was put into place as a result of Game 5 of the 2008 World Series, which was the first postseason game in history to be suspended and resumed from the point of suspension. Prior to the 2009 postseason, a playoff game had to have at least five innings completed in order to be suspendable, but could not be shortened unlike in the regular season; a playoff game stopped prior to that point had to be started over. An example was Game 1 of the 1982 National League Championship Series, which reached the top of the fifth inning, but had to be restarted from scratch the next day.
- If none of the previous scenarios apply, the game cannot be deemed official. The umpire crew chief declares "No Game," and a make-up of the game is scheduled for a future date unless it is not feasible. The latter occurs mainly among the minor leagues and college due to travel schedules, and only in the major leagues among teams that have been declared mathematically eliminated from postseason play where no benefit in the standings would be derived. The statistics compiled during the rained out game are not counted.
- If the game has reached official game status, and cannot be completed, with no available opportunity during the season to complete the game, and the visiting team has taken the lead with the home team not having completed their half of the inning, the inning is wiped, and the result of the game from the last completed full inning (home team wins or tied game) is the official result.

The scheduling of make up dates generally follow these guidelines:

- If the game is postponed or suspended and both teams play each other the following day, then the game will be completed the next day as part of a doubleheader. Venue remains the same.
- If the game is postponed or suspended and neither team has a game the following day, then the game will be made up the following day. Venue remains the same.
- If the game is postponed or suspended, one or both teams play a different team the following day, and the teams meet again at the same venue later in the season, then the game will be rescheduled to a future series between the two teams at that venue, usually as part of a doubleheader. This mainly applies to division rivals.
- If the game is postponed or suspended, one or both teams play a different team the following day, and the teams do not meet again at the same venue later in the season, then two options apply. Usually, the teams find a convenient shared open date to play the makeup game at the venue where the rainout occurred. In rare cases, if the teams play again later in the season, the game gets rescheduled to that series, usually as part of a doubleheader. For the makeup game, the team that would have hosted the game will wear their home jerseys and field for the top inning and bat in the bottom innings, even though the game is played at a different venue. This happened in 2013, when the Giants and the Reds met in a doubleheader at AT&T Park because a game between the two at Great American Ball Park was rained out and both teams had to play the following day.
- If more than one game is postponed or suspended in a series, then the previous rules apply to each game separately.
- If a makeup game must be postponed or suspended again, then the same doubleheader rules apply. This scenario is very uncommon.
- Major League Baseball has never played a postseason doubleheader, preferring to postpone games to avoid such an occurrence. However, there was one doubleheader played in 1887 during a 15-game "World’s Championship Series" between the Detroit Wolverines and the St. Louis Browns.
- In Minor League Baseball, postseason doubleheaders can happen but are very uncommon; one such instance happened in 1994, when the first game of the Pacific Coast League's championship series between the Vancouver Canadians and the Albuquerque Dukes was rained out and the two teams played a doubleheader on the day of the second game.
- If the teams are playing an international series and the game gets rained out, then the game will usually be made up at the neutral site as part of a doubleheader, but if that is not possible then the game gets rescheduled as part of a future series between the two at the designated home team's venue, usually as part of a doubleheader.
- Tripleheaders are now prohibited under the current collective bargaining agreement, except when the first game is the conclusion of a game suspended from a prior date. This would only happen in the extremely rare case at the end of the season, of the only remaining dates between teams being doubleheaders, no single games are left for the suspended game to precede, and playoff position, tiebreakers, or contention must be decided. The last triple header occurred on October 1, 1920.

=== Domed stadiums ===
Some teams have built stadiums with a roof to protect the field, either as a domed stadium or with a retractable roof. Despite this, the Houston Astros, who played at the Houston Astrodome for 35 years and currently play at the retractable roof-equipped Daikin Park, had a rainout at the Astrodome on June 15, 1976 due to intense flooding in the Houston area. The game, against the Pittsburgh Pirates, was later made up at Three Rivers Stadium in Pittsburgh despite the Astros still having a home series against the Pirates later that season.

=== Snow delay ===
Although rare, snow delays have occurred in baseball. This is usually the case in the early parts of the season that, although always starts after the spring equinox, is still within the historically possible range for the snow season in the northern half of North America. In fact, the first ever game of the Toronto Blue Jays in 1977, although not delayed, was affected by a minor snowstorm.

In April 2007, snow storms in northern Ohio caused the Cleveland Indians to postpone their home opening series against the Seattle Mariners and forced the Indians to find a different location for their home series against the Los Angeles Angels of Anaheim. MLB took advantage of the roof at Miller Park (home of the Milwaukee Brewers) and moved the Indians-Angels series to Milwaukee. All seats were sold for US$10 apiece (equivalent to $16 in 2025), and attendance was 52,496 for the three games. The Indians-Mariners games were eventually made up at various points in the season, including one game at Safeco Field during their regularly scheduled series in Seattle as part of a doubleheader in which the Indians were the designated home team for the first game.

== Motorsport ==
Some auto racing series do not compete in rain or snow, especially series that race on paved oval tracks. Rain and snow both severely diminish the traction between the slick tires and the surface. Other series, especially those that race on road courses such as Formula One and public roads as in rallying, use special treaded rain tires while the surface is wet but not in excessively heavy rain, snow, standing water, or lightning (which is an automatic cessation of racing because of pit crew, race marshals, and safety). Dirt track racing can be run in a light rain as the vehicles have treaded tires. Rallying can be held in rain or snow.

IndyCar and NASCAR do not compete on a wet or moist surface at most oval tracks, and do not compete at all during snowy conditions. They will not start an event unless the surface is dry. If the surface become wet during a race, the event is typically halted, and the cars are pulled off the track. Very light moisture may warrant only a temporary yellow caution period, while heavier rains or lightning usually require a red flag (stopped condition).

After the rain ceases, the sanctioning body will determine if the track surface can be dried within a reasonable time frame. The track is considered "lost" if rain thoroughly wets the surface, usually characterized by a dark look to the asphalt or concrete pavement. Track crews use jet dryers, which consist of modified jet engines, mounted upside down to allow the hot exhaust to pummel the surface. The hot exhaust acts to quickly evaporate the rainwater, and allow the surface to dry considerably quicker than normal conditions. Large scale wet-vacs are also sometimes used to supplement. While the rule primarily is enforced on ovals, on road courses, it will also be called if standing water (a safety hazard) becomes an issue according to drivers and the safety car officials.

The safety car driver will work with race stewards on the proper decision on a red flag when rain falls. In NASCAR, if the race start is delayed, officials may dispatch an experienced driver to run medium-speed laps around the circuit to evaluate the level of dryness. He then reports the results to his crew chief, who then relays his report to the officials.

In damp conditions, officials may elect to start a race under the Safety Car, especially if rain has ceased and the track is becoming dry. This represents an effort to get the race going without further delay, as well as employ the entire starting field of race cars to aid and speed up the drying process. In that situation, the green and yellow flags will be displayed at the starter's stand, indicating what is referred to as a "running yellow". These caution laps behind the Safety Car will count towards the distance. When the track is deemed fully dry, the safety car will leave the course, and the green flag will be displayed. This course of action was used at the 1979 Daytona 500, whereby the first 20 laps were run under yellow on a damp, but rapidly drying course. The green came finally came out at the start of lap 21. If by case heavy rain were to return during a "running yellow", the officials may elect to red flag the race, and at their discretion, may elect to simply restart the race from scratch (ignoring the "running yellow" laps that had been logged) when conditions allow.

If rain does not subside, the sanctioning body has multiple options. Typically, the race is considered "official" if at least one lap beyond the halfway point of the advertised distance has been completed (similar to baseball). The official distance milestone can achieved while under caution behind the safety car. In fact, if rain begins to fall very near the halfway point, officials will typically keep the cars out on the track behind the safety car as long as possible in order to achieve the necessary distance to make the race official. Once the race is more than 1 lap beyond halfway, the race can be deemed complete, and a winner can be declared if necessary. In any case, the race will halted with the red flag, and the officials will usually make an effort to wait out the showers, and potentially resume the race.

In some cases, if the race has already gone beyond the halfway point (especially if it is very near the scheduled finish) when rain falls, and the weather forecast is for day-long rain, no attempt to complete remaining laps will be made. If a heavy downpour occurs very near the end of the race, the officials may use their authority to wave the checkered flag at that instant, and end the race immediately (this occurred at the 1975 Indianapolis 500). If the event is halted before the halfway point, the resumption of the race can be postponed to later in the day, to the nighttime (if the track has lights), or to the following day (such as during the 1997 Indianapolis 500 and the 2020 Daytona 500).

INDYCAR and NASCAR both will use rain tires if they are at a road course. If the rain is severe enough where standing water, visibility becomes an issue, or if lightning is detected within a 12 km radius of the circuit, the race will be stopped. At the 2014 Honda Indy Toronto Race 1, INDYCAR attempted to wave green and yellow together to start the race under the Safety Car. After numerous incidents, INDYCAR decided to abandon the race and wiped the slate clean for Sunday with two races. They also stopped the 2018 Honda Indy Grand Prix of Alabama before the halfway limit was reached because of heavy rain, and completed the race the next day. INDYCAR also has cancelled qualifying at a circuit because of lightning, primarily as a safety issue with electronics, radio communications, teams on pit lane, race marshals, and spectators.

Starting in 2023, NASCAR will use rain tires on the lower-banked oval tracks such as Phoenix (where the title race has been held since 2020) and Martinsville (which was the site of the first oval race ran on rain tires, this happened in the Truck Series race, though it was still stopped for good after 124 of 200 scheduled laps completed).

The code in USAC, NASCAR, and IndyCar states if fewer than half the laps or time are completed or if the race is unable to start, the event is resumed on a later date, usually the next day. With the introduction of lights at numerous oval tracks, the time frame for resuming a rain delayed race on the same day has been largely expanded. Some races stopped during the day for rain have seen the track dried, and the race completed later in the evening on the same day. Since the 2017 season, all NASCAR national series utilize a format in which races are divided into three or four stages, with a competition caution after each; a race is considered official following the conclusion of the second stage, which is typically positioned around two quarters of the scheduled distance.

Most road racing (except in the United States) does not use the 50 percent rule. In the FIA Code, if severe rain forces the race to be interrupted, the regulations state if less than two green flag laps (no virtual safety car or safety car laps) were completed, the race is canceled and will not be made up. Once a race is on its fourth green flag lap, the race is official. Depending on the series, either half points or a sliding scale will be used for points if the race is terminated early.

=== Famous events delayed by rain in motorsport ===
The 1976 Indianapolis 500 was the shortest Indianapolis 500 in history, one lap past official status, with 102 laps completed and 255 miles (410 km) of 500 miles (800 km).

The 1976 Japanese Grand Prix was delayed because of rain. When the race eventually started, championship leader Niki Lauda pulled out because of the dangerous conditions, allowing James Hunt to score enough points to win the championship.

The MotoGP 2008 Red Bull Indianapolis Grand Prix was drastically affected by Hurricane Ike. The 250cc (now 600cc Moto2) class race was cancelled because of heavy rains, while earlier in the days the races in the 125cc (now 250cc Moto3) and MotoGP classes were curtailed because of weather.

The 2009 Petit Le Mans in Braselton, Georgia, was an example of a rainout under the FIA Code, where only three completed laps are needed for an official race and less than half the race (184 of 394 laps). The red flag waved after 184 laps at the 4:52 point of the race. In endurance racing, the clock does not stop for red flags. IMSA waited until 8 PM to declare the race official. While the race was thirteen laps under the official threshold (500 miles), the clock had passed the five-hour mark when the race was called at 8 PM.

The 2012 Daytona 500 was postponed by rain for the first time in history, as it was postponed 30 hours from 1 PM Sunday to 7 PM Monday.

The 2019 Japanese Grand Prix saw the qualifying session moved to the race day morning due to Typhoon Hagibis, a first in Formula One history. Parts of the track infrastructure were disassembled and then reassembled for race day because they were not expected to withstand the storm. Though the typhoon had passed, high winds continued during the qualifying session and caused several crashes within minutes of the session start.

== Cricket ==
Cricket matches are not played when the weather would make it "dangerous or unreasonable for play to take place". Rain is by far the most common such weather event.

In first-class or test matches, playing times can be extended to allow for lost time to be made up but no changes are made to either team's scores. Any time that cannot be made up is lost.

In limited-overs cricket, rain during the match can leave teams facing an unequal number of overs or can cause the team batting first to lose overs after their innings has begun. In these cases, the number of runs accredited to either one or both teams may be revised. A common method to recalculate the number of runs accredited to either team is the Duckworth–Lewis-Stern method (DLS).

== Consequences in live broadcasting ==
In event of a rain delay, most television broadcasters run alternate programming (also known as "rain delay filler"), in place of the scheduled game or event. Depending on event, the alternate programming takes many forms, such as a movie, an infomercial, a rerun of a television program, interviews & analysis, highlights of the last event, or even another game or for networks such as ESPN and Fox Sports 1, "whiparound" coverage of other games from other regional sports networks (Fox Sports 1 also maintains a regularly scheduled program, MLB Whiparound). The delay continues until the weather is cleared up enough to resume the game, or if it comes to a point where it is not practical to resume it; in this case, it would become a "rain out".

In some cases, if the rain delay is in danger of interfering with the network's schedule that would follow after the game, they would often transfer coverage of the game to another station or channel or show it later on via tape delay, depending on the organizational policy. For instance, with Sunday afternoon NASCAR events and Saturday night NHL games, a race on a broadcast network such as Fox or NBC would be moved to an alternate cable network such as Fox Sports 1 or NBCSN if the delay runs several hours, to allow those networks to present their prime time entertainment schedules (or, in NBC's case, its late night show Saturday Night Live, which has been protected from sports-related delays since an incident with the XFL in 2001), or later in NASCAR's season with NBC, allows contingency as NBC Sunday Night Football takes full contractual precedence over NASCAR events.

The 2011 NHL Winter Classic was scheduled to take place at 1 PM EST New Year's Day, but ended up delayed to 8 PM EST due to unusually warm weather in the Pittsburgh area, with rain impacting the game. Because the game was then moved to prime time, the game ended up having the unintended result of bringing in higher ratings for NBC in the United States, giving the NHL the highest ratings for a regular-season game since 1975. Despite this, subsequent Winter Classics remain played in the early afternoon hours, as the game is purposefully scheduled at that time to avoid the College Football Playoff bowl games, mainly the Rose Bowl Game and Sugar Bowl most years. The NHL Outdoors at Lake Tahoe games which were played in February 2021 were likewise delayed from their original daytime starts on NBC to late night on NBCSN unexpectedly, due to bright sunshine affecting the quality of the ice surface along the shoreline of Lake Tahoe.

== See also ==
- Weather-related cancellation
