= Boris Midney =

American musician

Boris Midney (born October 22, 1937) is a Soviet-born American musician, producer, composer and conductor.

== Biography ==
Midney was born in Moscow to a conductor and pianist father and classical singer mother. He studied classical composition and clarinet also teaching himself to play saxophone.

In 1964 he defected from the USSR via the US embassy in Japan. Midney's main reason for leaving the USSR was the censorship of art. After arriving in New York City, he formed The Russian Jazz Quartet with whom he recorded an album for Impulse Records. In the 1960s, Midney married Tania Armour from the Armour & Company family.

Later, Midney became a prolific composer and producer of disco music although he rarely was credited under his own name. Using guises such as USA-European Connection, Masquerade, Double Discovery, Caress, Companion and Festival, Midney produced a large body of disco music. He is recognised as being among the first producers to take full advantage of 48-track recording and one of the creators of the Eurodisco genre. Among his productions were disco adaptations of the Broadway musical Evita and of the score for The Empire Strikes Back.

Describing his disco music, critics Alan Jones and Jussi Kantonen wrote:

On the Mount Olympus of disco there are numerous gods but there is only one Zeus and his name is Boris Midney. He's the Stephen Sondheim, David Hockney and Stanley Kubrick of the disco genre all rolled into one.

In 1999 Midney released Trancetter, a progressive trance album. In 1999, OZ/Hot Records reissued Midney's entire catalog on CD.

== Discography ==
- Music From The Empire Strikes Back (RSO, 1980)
- Trancetter (Max Music & Entertainment Inc., 1999)

With The Russian Jazz Quartet

- Happiness (Impulse, 1964)

With Paul Levinson

- Twice Upon a Rhyme (HappySad Records, 1972)

As USA-European Connection

- Come into My Heart (Marlin, 1978)
- USA-European Connection (Marlin, 1978)

US Billboard Dance Chart
Date	Title	Position
1978	Come Into My Heart	1
1979	USA-European Connection	43

As Beautiful Bend

- Make That Feeling Come Again! (aka Beautiful Bend) (Marlin, 1978)

US Billboard Dance Chart
Date	Position
1979	3

As Festival

- Evita (RSO, 1979)

US Billboard Dance Chart
Date	Position
1979	3

As Masquerade

- Pinocchio (Prelude, 1979)

As Caress

- Caress (Warner Bros., 1979)

US Billboard Dance Chart
Date	Title	Position
1979	"Catch The Rhythm"	31

As Companion

- Companion (Barclay, 1981)
