= Phil D'Amato =

Fictional character

- The Chronology Protection Case by Paul Levinson, 1995
- First appearance: The Chronology Protection Case (1995)
- Last appearance: The Pixel Eye (2003)
- Created by: Paul Levinson
- Portrayed by: Mark Shanahan (radio play); Jay Kensinger (short film)

In-universe information
- Gender: Male
- Occupation: NYPD detective, forensic scientist
- Nationality: American

Dr. Phil D’Amato is the central character in three science fiction mystery novelettes and three novels written by Paul Levinson. The first novelette, "The Chronology Protection Case", was adapted into a radio play which was nominated for an Edgar Award by the Mystery Writers of America. The first novel, The Silk Code, won the Locus Award for the Best First Novel of 1999. The fictional D'Amato, who has a PhD in forensic science, is a detective with the NYPD.

== Novelettes ==
=== "The Chronology Protection Case" ===
Dr. Phil D’Amato debuted in "The Chronology Protection Case", published in the American magazine Analog in 1995. The novelette was nominated for Nebula and Sturgeon Awards.

It has been reprinted five times:

- The Mammoth Book of Time Travel SF edited by Mike Ashley, 2013
- The Best Time Travel Stories of All Time edited by Barry N. Malzberg, 2003
- Nebula Awards 32: SFWA's Choices for the Best Science Fiction and Fantasy of the Year edited by Jack Dann, 1998
- Supernatural Sleuths edited by Charles G. Waugh & Martin H. Greenberg, 1996
- Infinite Edge, a webzine, 1997

The novelette was adapted into a radio play written by Mark Shanahan (with Paul Levinson and Jay Kensinger) in 2002, and performed at New York City's Museum of Television and Radio. In addition to being nominated for the Edgar Allan Poe Award for Best Play, the radio play was later recorded and released as an audiobook by Listen & Live/Audible.com in 2004.

"The Chronology Protection Case" was also adapted into a student film by director Jay Kensinger, which premiered at the I-Con SF Convention in 2002, and was later released on DVD by MODVEC Productions. A re-cut version of the movie, in black-and-white and with a new extended ending, was released in 2013 on Amazon Prime Video.

"The Chronology Protection Case" extrapolates from Stephen Hawking’s chronology protection conjecture, and posits a vengeful universe that seeks to protect itself from time travel by killing any scientists who discover or even begin to understand how to do it.

=== "The Copyright Notice Case" ===
D’Amato returned in "The Copyright Notice Case", published in Analog in 1996. The novelette was nominated for a Nebula Award, won the HOMer Award, and was reprinted in Levinson’s anthology, Bestseller: Wired, Analog, and Digital Writings in 1999.

The novelette explores what might happen had an inviolable copyright notice been embedded in human DNA in the prehistoric past. Phil meets Jenna Katen for the first time in this story.

=== "The Mendelian Lamp Case" ===
D’Amato’s last appearance in short fiction to date came in "The Mendelian Lamp Case", a novelette published in Analog in 1997.

It was reprinted three times:

- The Hard SF Renaissance edited by David G. Hartwell & Kathryn Cramer, 2002
- Science Fiction Theater edited by Brian Forbes, 1999
- Year's Best SF3 edited by David G. Hartwell, 1998

While investigating the mysterious death of a friend, D'Amato discovers an Amish-like group who use innocent-looking bio-technology for nefarious ends.

== Novels ==
The Silk Code (1999).

=== The Silk Code ===
Levinson continues the intrigue of "The Mendelian Lamp Case" in his first novel, The Silk Code (Tor Books, 1999). Phil D’Amato uses his debut in longer form to explore not only bio-technology and groups masquerading as Amish, but the possible survival of Neanderthals into the present day.

The Silk Code won the Locus Award for Best First Novel of 1999. A Polish translation —Kod Jedwabiu— was published in 2003. An "author's cut" Kindle edition was published by JoSara Media in 2012.

The Consciousness Plague (2002)

=== The Consciousness Plague ===
D’Amato’s next novelistic outing was in The Consciousness Plague, published in 2002 by Tor Books. Here D’Amato gets caught up in the possibility that our very consciousness may be engendered by microorganisms that live in the brain. Paths of exploration in this novel range from Lindisfarne to Julian Jaynes’s Origin of Consciousness in the Breakdown of the Bicameral Mind.

The Consciousness Plague won the Media Ecology Association’s Mary Shelley Award and was translated into Polish as Zaraza Swiadomosci and published in 2005. An audiobook narrated by Mark Shanahan was released by Listen and Live in 2005, and nominated for the Audie Award that year. An "author's cut" Kindle edition was published by JoSara Media in 2013.

The Pixel Eye (2003).

=== The Pixel Eye ===
Phil D’Amato’s most recent appearance is in The Pixel Eye, published in 2003 by Tor Books. In this chilling post 9/11 tale set in New York City, D’Amato contends with squirrels and other critters whose brains are outfitted with microchips that transmit everything they see and hear. Holography figures prominently in the story. Although all of the D’Amato stories are set in New York, The Pixel Eye has the most extensive New York ambiences - from Central Park to the New York Public Library on Fifth Avenue to Grand Central Terminal.

The Pixel Eye was nominated for the Prometheus Award in 2004. An "author's cut" Kindle edition was published by JoSara Media in 2014.

== Critical commentary ==
Multiple Nebula and Hugo Award winning author Connie Willis said "Forensic detective Phil D’Amato is one of my favorite characters."

== See also ==
- The Plot to Save Socrates
- Paul Levinson
