= Wind assistance =

Benefit that an athlete receives during a race or event as registered by a wind gauge

In track and field, wind assistance is the benefit that an athlete receives during a race or event as registered by a wind gauge. Wind is one of many forms of weather that can affect sport. Tailwinds are denoted as positive (+) values, while headwinds are denoted as negative (−) values.

Due to a tailwind helping to enhance the speed of the athlete in events like certain sprint races (100 and 200 metres), 100/110 metres hurdles, the triple jump and the long jump, there is a limit to how much wind assistance the athlete may compete under if the performance is to establish a record. If a tail wind exceeds 2 metres per second (3.9 kn) the result can not be registered as a record on any level. However, the results within that competition are still valid because all athletes in said race would receive similar assistance, and in field events it is just random circumstance at the moment of the attempt. The wind assistance maximums are only in regard to the validation of a record.

The exceptions are the combined events like heptathlon and decathlon. Here, the total score may be accepted even though some of the results had a tail wind of more than 2.0 m/s. In events where wind velocity is measured, the average velocity (based on the algebraic sum of the wind velocities, as measured for each individual event, divided by the number of such events) shall not exceed +2.0 m/s (Rule 260.18). Higher average velocity was previously allowed as long as no individual event would exceed +4.0 m/s, but World Athletics removed this rule in 2010.

There have also been cases where the prevailing wind has aided point to point long-distance races like the 2011 Boston Marathon, however the nature of point to point courses invalidate allowable records by design.

== Notable cases of strong wind assistance ==
=== 100 metres ===
Obadele Thompson ran the 100 metres in 9.69 seconds in April 1996 in El Paso. The result would have been a new world record, had it not been for the tail wind of >5.0 m/s. This was then bettered by Tyson Gay in June 2008, when Gay ran a time of 9.68 seconds with the help of a +4.1 m/s tailwind. That mark was surpassed when Usain Bolt set the current world record the following year, 9.58 with a legal +0.9 tailwind.

Tyreek Hill ran the 100 metres in 9.98 seconds in May 2013, which would have made him the youngest to break the 10-second barrier, had it not been for the 5.0 m/s tailwind. That mark was also surpassed when Trayvon Bromell set the current world junior record 9.97 with a legal +1.8 wind at an even younger age the following year.

When the women's world record holder Florence Griffith Joyner ran her 10.49 in 1988, the official wind reading was 0.0. Many observers have later noted evidence of a significant wind, suggesting the anemometer was defective.

=== 200 metres ===
Leroy Burrell ran 200 metres in 19.61 seconds in May 1990 at College Station, Texas, well under the world record at the time (19.72 – Pietro Mennea – Mexico 1979) but with a tail wind of 4.0 m/s. Also, Michael Johnson ran the 200 metres in 19.70 seconds on 22 June 1996, during a semi-final race at the US Olympic Trials in Atlanta, with a tail wind of 2.7 m/s. The next day, in the final race, he improved the long-standing world record to 19.66 seconds, which he improved further at the Olympic Games, with a 19.32 in the same city in August.

=== 100/110 metres hurdles ===
Renaldo Nehemiah ran a would-be 110 metres hurdles world record of 12.91 seconds in June 1979 in Champaign, Illinois with a tail wind of 3.5 m/s. Roger Kingdom later became the first person to break the 12.90-second-barrier, running in 12.87 seconds in September 1989 at the World Cup in Barcelona with a tail wind of 2.6 m/s. As of 2013, the world record is 12.80 seconds.

In June 1979, just days after equalling her own 100 metres hurdles world record of 12.48 seconds, Grażyna Rabsztyn ran the distance in 12.39 seconds in Bremen with a 2.8 m/s tail wind. The next year Rabsztyn became the first woman to legally run under 12.40 when she improved the world record to 12.36 seconds. Since then, other athletes have registered faster wind-assisted times, notably Tobi Amusan of Nigeria (Omo Naija from Ijebu-Ode) who broke her own world record of 12.12 seconds with a time of 12.06 seconds about an hour after setting it with a tail wind of 2.5 m/s (she broke the world record (12.20 seconds by Kendra Harrison) set in July 2016.

=== Triple jump ===
Willie Banks became the first athlete to break the 18-metre-barrier in the triple jump, but with a tailwind of 5.2 m/s his 18.20 m jump in July 1988 in Indianapolis was not recognized as a world record. Mike Conley jumped 18.17 at the 1992 Summer Olympics, and the tail wind of 2.1 m/s was only marginally non-legal. Jonathan Edwards, who later became the first athlete to legally break the 18-metre-barrier with an 18.16 metre jump before setting his current world record later at that meeting, jumped 18.43 metres in June 1995 in Villeneuve-d'Ascq in a tailwind of 2.4 m/s.

In May 2007, Keila Costa became the first South American woman to break the 15-metre-barrier. Her 15.10 m jump in Uberlândia, Brazil had a tail wind of 2.7 m/s. Her legal personal best jump was 14.43 at the time, and the South American record was 14.53 metres. The next month Costa improved the South American record to 14.57 metres.

=== Long jump ===
In the long jump, Iván Pedroso jumped 8.96 metres in Sestriere, Italy in 1995 to break the world record by one centimetre – however, the result was never accepted due to wind assistance problems. The wind gauge did show a legal tail wind of 1.2 m/s, but this was declared void as someone had been standing in front of the gauge, thereby interfering with the wind measurement and rendering the result unusable.

When Mike Powell set the world record at the 1991 World Championships in Athletics, moments before, Carl Lewis broke the existing world record by Bob Beamon with an 8.91, only to have it invalidated for record purposes by the +2.9 wind. Still in the competition, Powell then needed to jump over the world record to win the competition. He succeeded, and the wind had died down to only +0.3, enough to record a legal wind for the record as well. In a later competition, Powell jumped 8.99, also in Sestriere, but without setting a record due to a +4.4 wind.

At the 2009 IWAS World Games, Paralympian Wojtek Czyz broke his own F42 classification world record twice. Wind readings of +4.0 and +4.1 invalidated both jumps.

Also, two Oceanian records were not recognized. Gary Honey jumped 8.39 metres in July 1984 in Sacramento, California, and Peter Burge jumped 8.48 in September 2000 in Gold Coast, Queensland. Both results had too strong tailwind. Only weeks after Burge's jump, the Oceanian record was improved with a legal 8.49 metres jump by Jai Taurima.

In July 1992 in Sestriere, former world record holder for women Heike Drechsler jumped over the world record mark with 7.63 metres, with a tail wind of 2.1 m/s.

=== Combined events ===
Dan O'Brien's decathlon result of 8844 points from June 1991 in New York City was better than the world record at the time, but not recognized due to wind assistance. The next year O'Brien set a legal world record of 8891 points, which has since been improved further.

In the heptathlon, wind-assisted series have been rare. Tatyana Chernova greatly outperformed the current world junior record of 6542 points with a wind-assisted score of 6768 points in June 2007 in Arles, France. Other wind-assisted series from Arles were recorded in 1987 and 2006.

=== Road running ===
There is no wind speed rule for road events, but the start and finish points of a course, measured along a theoretical straight line between them, shall not be further apart than 50% of the race distance to be allowed as a record. This is due to the wind advantage that might take place for a straight course. The Athens Classic Marathon (from Marathon to Athens) has a too long distance, although it is too hilly to give any records.

=== Throwing events ===
Wind speed is not traditionally measured in throwing events like the shot put, discus throw, javelin throw, and hammer throw, and there is no rule discounting marks set in high wind. In 2024, Mykolas Alekna broke the discus world record in Ramona, Oklahoma, and his throw was reported to have been helped by high winds in the area.

At the 1925 USA Outdoor Track and Field Championships, Henry Bonura threw the javelin 65.19 metres (213.9 ft), better than the then-American record, but the mark was not accepted as a record due to wind assistance.
