= Rain check (baseball) =

Ticket issues to baseball spectators if a game is cancelled due to rain

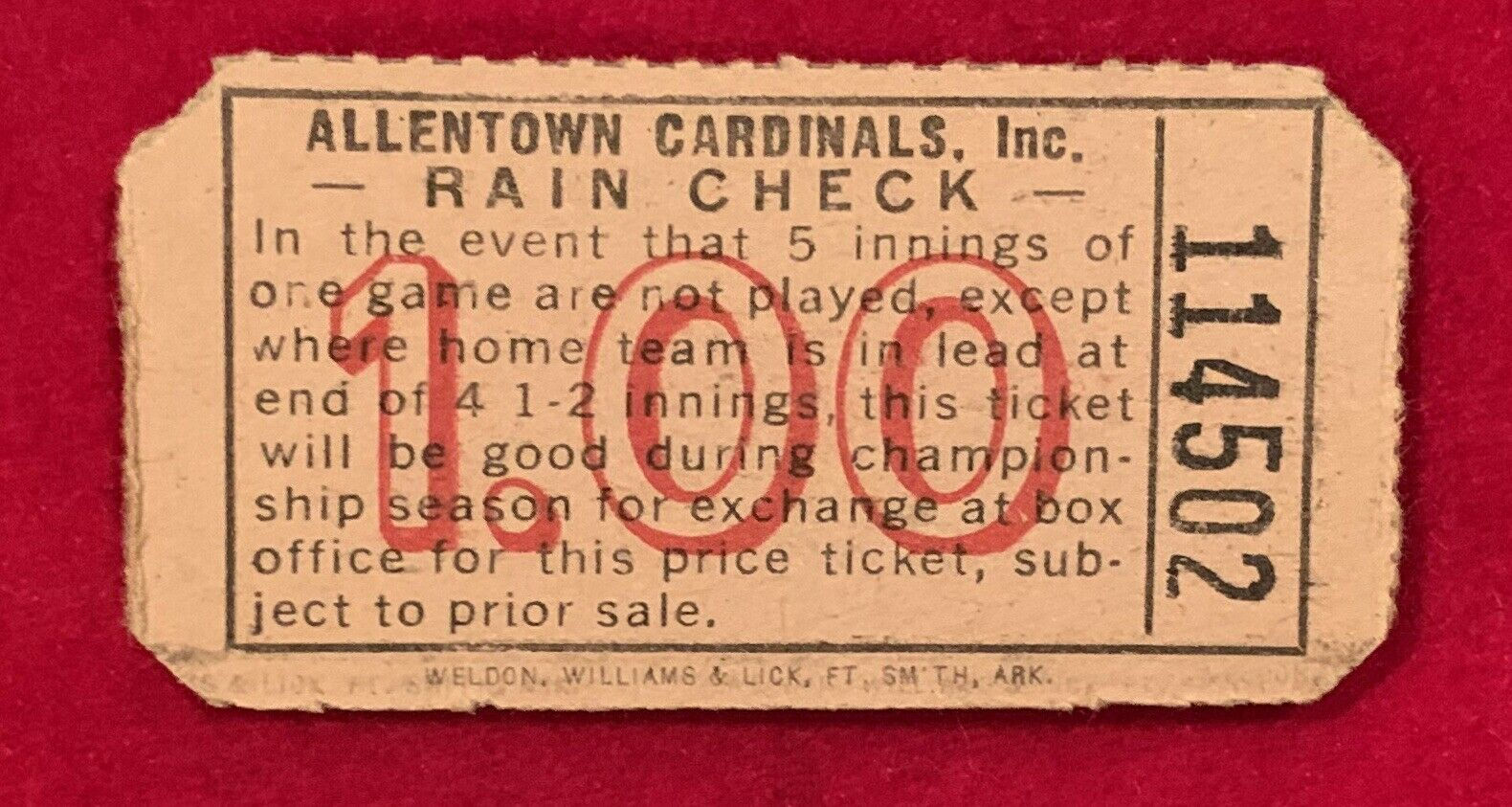
A combination ticket and rain check issued by the Allentown Cardinals in 1950

In baseball, a rain check is a ticket issued to spectators which admits them to the ballpark at a later date at no additional cost to the ticket holder. It is issued if a game is cancelled due to rain or other inclement weather, or if a game has been started but suspended due to inclement weather prior to the point of becoming an official game (five innings in regular season Major League Baseball games or at any time during the postseason). Depending on the home team/league policy and the rescheduling of the game, the rain check may admit the ticket holder to watch the rained out game or the continuation of a suspended game only on the rescheduled date, or it may allow the ticket holder to exchange the tickets for tickets of equal value to another game within a specified time frame.

Rain checks were originally separate tickets issued by the home team to spectators as they left the ballpark following a rainout. In modern times, the ticket to the rained out game serves as the rain check. The practice has been recorded since the 1870s – though it did not become generally established until the 20th century – and today the term "rain check" is used idiomatically to refer to any deferred promise.

== History ==
The institution of issuing tickets for games canceled due to rain dates at least to 1870, while the term rain check dates to at least 1877; in the National League it was pioneered by the St. Louis Brown Stockings:

The St. Louis club is the only nine in the league which gives its patrons the right to see a full game or no pay. In Chicago and other cities, after the first inning is interrupted by rain the spectators are supposed to have received their money's worth. In St. Louis 'rain checks' are issued in such cases.

Originally a rain check for a canceled game was simply a ticket valid for a future game – in lieu of a refund – not specifically for a makeup game. Further, at the time clubs would sell reusable hard cardboard tickets, which were turned in at the admissions gate, then resold at the box office at the conclusion of the game. Originally rain checks were issued to spectators as they exited, but this resulted in severe losses to clubs, due to free-riders and fence-climbers also getting tickets. This was solved by Abner Powell circa 1889 by using a stub on the original ticket as rain check. Powell is thus often incorrectly credited with inventing rain checks, while in fact he instead refined an existing practice.
