= USA European Connection =

Disco group

- Origin: United States
- Genres: Disco
- Past members: Leza Holmes; Renne Johnson; Sharon Williams

USA European Connection was a disco group created by producer Boris Midney and featuring vocals by Leza Holmes, Renne Johnson, and Sharon Williams. In 1978 USA European Connection hit #1 on the Hot Dance Music/Club Play chart with the Come into My Heart album, and released a second self-titled album in 1979.

Midney who was among the principal architects of the Eurodisco sound and one of the first to exploit the full potential of 48-track recording, his trademark blend of strings, horn and percussion created a deep, lush sound. Born in Russia, Midney is a classically trained composer who started out writing film scores; turning to disco, however, he worked under a variety of names including Caress, Beautiful Bend, the USA/European Connection, Masquerade, Double Discovery, Companion and Festival, producing a large body of work from his New York City studio ERAS recording.

== See also ==
- List of number-one dance hits (United States)
- List of artists who reached number one on the US Dance chart
