= The Russian Jazz Quartet =

American jazz ensemble

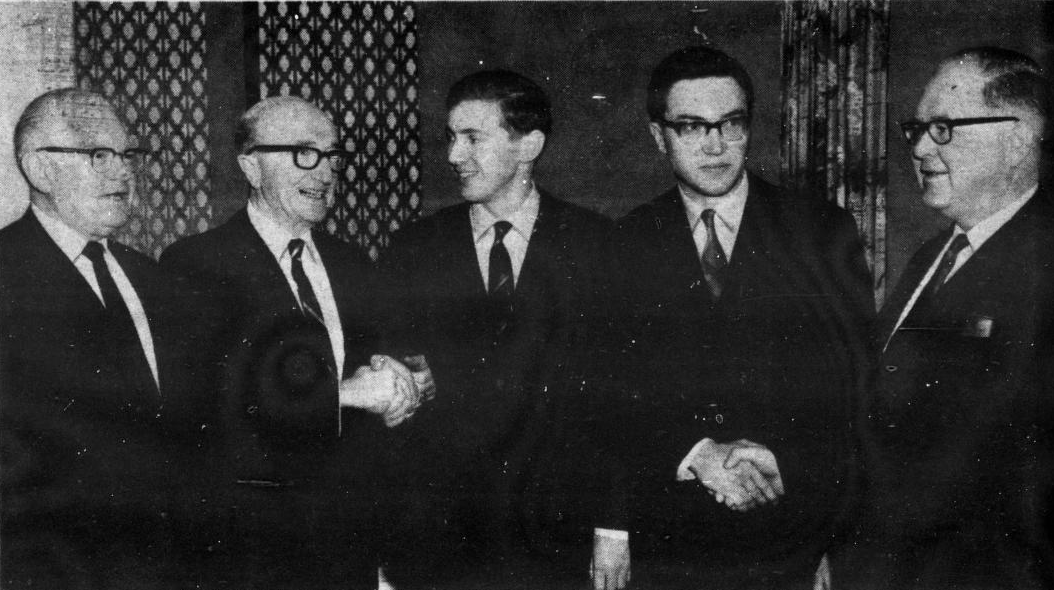
Boris Midney and Igor Berukshtis meeting union officials in 1964

The Russian Jazz Quartet was a jazz ensemble founded in 1964 by saxophonist and clarinetist Boris Midney and double bassist Igor Berukshtis who had defected from the Soviet Union. New Yorkers Roger Kellaway and Grady Tate also performed in the ensemble. The group took inspiration from the Modern Jazz Quartet.

Midney formed a jazz quartet whilst studying classical music in the Soviet Union. He, along with Berukshtis, defected from the USSR through a US Embassy while visiting Japan in 1964. A press conference was held for the pair when they arrived in New York City. They were sponsored by American Friends of Russian Freedom, a CIA-linked organisation for Soviet defectors, who found them a manager in New York. Midney explained that he left the Soviet Union due to censorship of the arts and the suppression of jazz.

They recorded an album, Happiness, which was released by the Impulse! label in 1965. The album was described by Ashley Kahn as "perestroika twenty-five years too soon." Happiness received a rating of three-and-a-half out of five stars in a review from the publication Down Beat.

Midney proceeded to have success in the United States as a producer, composer and conductor. He married Tanya Armour of the Armour and Company family. Berukshtis later broadcast jazz commentary on Radio Liberty. He went on to become a teacher.
