= Come into My Heart =

Studio album by USA European Connection
- Released: 1978
- Studio: Alpha International
- Genre: Disco
- Label: Marlin
- Producers: Boris Midney, Peter Pelullo

Come into My Heart is a 1978 album by USA European Connection. It was written and produced by Boris Midney. All of the tracks reached number one on the disco chart for two weeks and stayed there for more than five months.

The album peaked at No. 66 on the Billboard 200 chart.

== Critical reception ==
Professional ratings
Review scores
Source	Rating
AllMusic	2/5 stars
The New Rolling Stone Record Guide	2/5 stars

AllMusic wrote that "lovers of exotic hand-dancing enjoyed this kind of music... For soul and rock afficionados, [sic] however, the whole ordeal comes off rather bland."

== Track listing ==
All tracks are written by Boris Midney.

Side one
No.	Title	Length
1.	"Come into My Heart" / "Good Loving"	14:28

Side two
No.	Title	Length
2.	"Love's Coming" / "Baby Love"	12:52
