= Out of left field =

US slang expression

"Out of left field" (also "out in left field", and simply "left field" or "leftfield") is American slang meaning "unexpected", "odd" or "strange".

== Usage ==
In Safire's Political Dictionary, columnist William Safire writes that the phrase "out of left field" means "out of the ordinary, out of touch, far out." The variation "out in left field" means alternately "removed from the ordinary, unconventional" or "out of contact with reality, out of touch." He opines that the term has only a tangential connection to the political left or the Left Coast, political slang for the coastal states of the American west.

== Origins ==
Popular music historian Arnold Shaw wrote in 1949 for the Music Library Association that the term "out of left field" was first used in the idiomatic sense of "from out of nowhere" by the music industry to refer to a song that unexpectedly performed well in the market. Based on baseball lingo, a sentence such as "That was a hit out of left field" was used by song pluggers who promoted recordings and sheet music, to describe a song requiring no effort to sell. A "rocking chair hit" was the kind of song which came "out of left field" and sold itself, allowing the song plugger to relax. A 1943 article in Billboard expands the use to describe people unexpectedly drawn to radio broadcasting:

Latest twist in radio linked with the war is the exceptional number of quasi-clerical groups and individuals who have come out of left field in recent months and are trying to buy, not promote, radio time.

Further instances of the phrase were published in the 1940s, including in Billboard and once in a humor book titled How to Be Poor.

In May 1981, Safire asked readers of The New York Times to send him any ideas they had regarding the origin of the phrase "out of left field"—he did not know where it came from, and did not refer to Shaw's work. On June 28, 1981, he devoted most of his Sunday column to the phrase, offering up various responses he received. The earliest scholarly citation Safire could find was a 1961 article in the journal American Speech, which defined the variation "out in left field" as meaning "disoriented, out of contact with reality." Linguist John Algeo told Safire that the phrase most likely came from baseball observers rather than from baseball fans or players.

In 1998, American English professor Robert L. Chapman, in his book American Slang, wrote that the phrase "out of left field" was in use by 1953. He did not cite Shaw's work and he did not point to printed instances of the phrase in the 1940s. Marcus Callies, an associate professor of English and philology at the University of Mainz in Germany, wrote that "the precise origin is unclear and disputed", referring to Christine Ammer's conclusion in The American Heritage Dictionary of Idioms. Callies suggested that the left fielder in baseball might throw the ball to home plate in an effort to get the runner out before he scores, and that the ball, coming from behind the runner out of left field, would surprise the runner.

According to the 2007 Concise New Partridge Dictionary of Slang and Unconventional English, the phrase came from baseball terminology, referring to a play in which the ball is thrown from the area covered by the left fielder to either home plate or first base, surprising the runner. Variations include "out in left field" and simply "left field".

At the site of the University of Illinois Medical Center in Chicago, Illinois, a 2008 plaque marks the site of the former West Side Park, where the Chicago Cubs played from 1893 to 1915. The plaque states that the location of the county hospital and its psychiatric patients just beyond left field is the origin of the phrase "way out in left field."

== See also ==
- Leftfield, electronic music group
