= Twice Upon a Rhyme =

Studio album by Paul Levinson with Ed Fox and Peter Rosenthal
- Released: 1972
- Recorded: 1969–1971 at various studios in New York City
- Genres: Folk rock, psychedelic folk
- Length: 51:05
- Label: HappySad Records
- Producers: Paul Levinson and Ed Fox

Paul Levinson "Looking for Sunsets (In the Early Morning)", 1972
20 second sample from Twice Upon a Rhyme

Twice Upon a Rhyme is an LP record by Paul Levinson with Ed Fox and Peter Rosenthal. It was released in 1972 by HappySad Records on vinyl.

Twice Upon a Rhyme was recorded on and off from 1969 to 1971. It includes all original material by Paul Levinson writing solo and with collaborating writers. Levinson is the featured artist, with Ed Fox and Peter Rosenthal. (Boris Midney, Don Frankel, Jay Sackett, Mitch Greenberg, Alan Fuhr and Jesse Stiller also performed on the album.) The album was produced by Paul Levinson and Ed Fox. Twice Upon a Rhyme was a small pressing distributed around the country. It received some airplay, but did not break out as a hit and remained in obscurity until thirty years later, when the album began showing up from time to time on cult collectors' lists of 1960s music, with copies appearing on eBay occasionally, and accumulating fans among European and American collectors.

The July 2002 issue of Japan's Record Collector magazine featured Twice Upon a Rhyme in its roundup of American 1960s "Psychedelic Movements". The reviewer, Taro Miyasugi, said, "It's human mystical pop music... wonderful songs."

The album is included in Hans Pokora's book, 4001 Record Collector Dreams, Patrick Lundborg's Acid Archives, and Vernon Joynson's Fuzz Acid and Flowers Revisited.

Twice Upon a Rhyme was re-issued on CD-Sized Album Replica with bonus tracks on Big Pink Records in South Korea in 2008 and Vivid Records in Japan in 2009, and in remastered vinyl by Whiplash/Sound of Salvation Records in the United Kingdom in 2010.

== Track listing ==
1. "Today Is Just Like You" (Levinson)
2. "Looking For Sunsets (In The Early Morning)" (Levinson/Fox)
3. "Gentle Blue Cherry Bell" (Levinson/Fox)
4. "I'm Seeing You In A Different Light" (Levinson/Fox)
5. "Learn To Learn" (Levinson/Fox)
6. "Looks Like A Night (I Won't Catch Much Sleep In)" (Levinson/Fox)
7. "Raincheck" (Levinson/Fox)
8. "You Are Everywhere" (Levinson/Kaley)
9. "Forever Friday" (Levinson/Fox)
10. "The Soft Of Your Eyes" (Levinson)
11. "Antique Shop (The Coming Of Winter)" (Levinson/Rosenthal)
12. "Not Yet Ready To Say Goodbye" (Levinson/Kaplan)
13. "The Lama Will Be Late This Year" (Levinson/Fox)
