= Paul Levinson =

American novelist (born 1947)

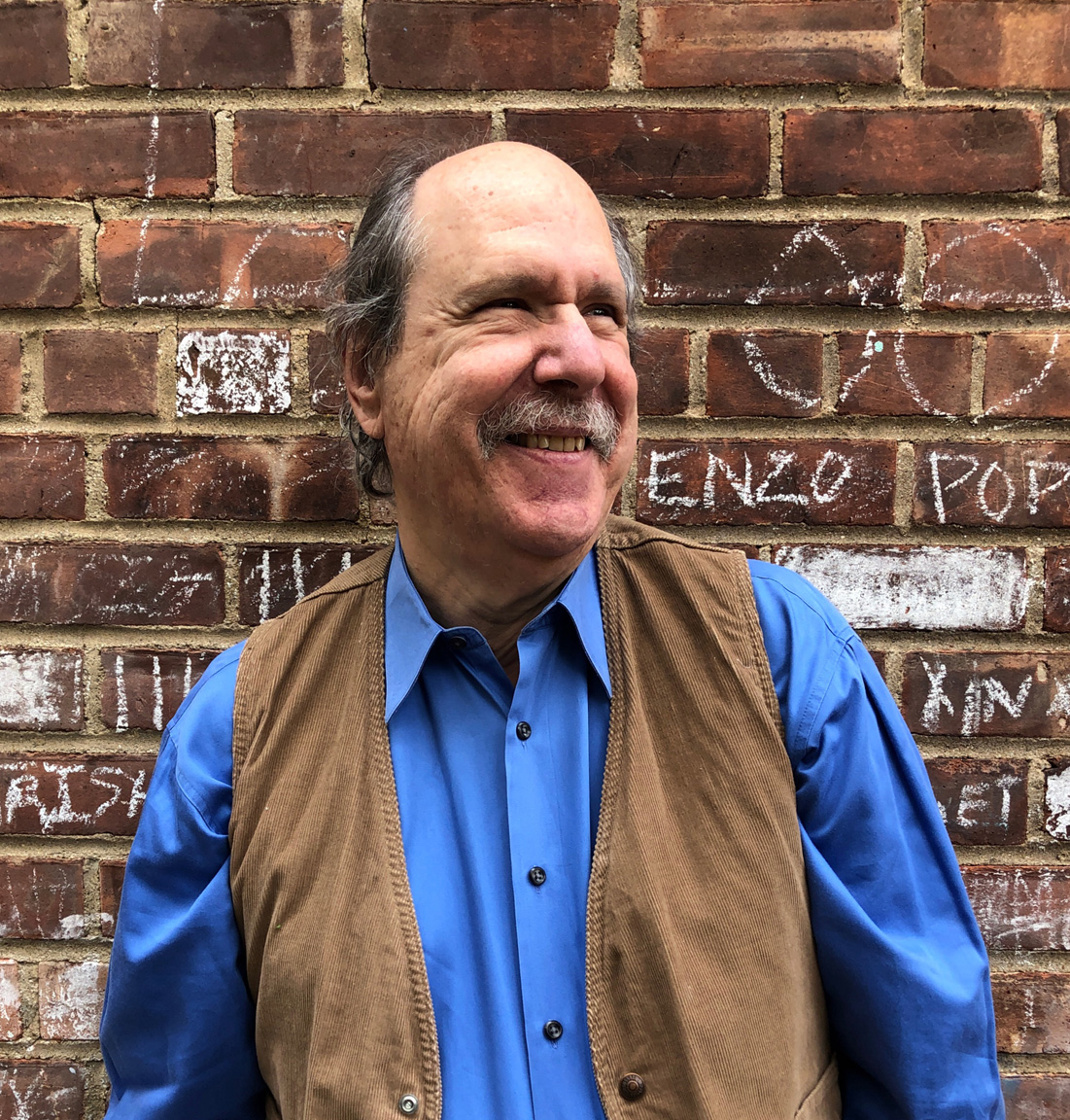
- Levinson in 2019
- Born: March 25, 1947 (age 79); Bronx, New York, U.S.
- Education: Christopher Columbus High School; City College of New York; New York University (BA, PhD); The New School (MA)
- Occupations: Media theorist, novelist, singer-songwriter, short story writer

Paul Levinson (born March 25, 1947) is an American media theorist, novelist, singer-songwriter, and short story writer. He currently serves as professor of communications and media studies at Fordham University in New York City. His novels, short fiction, and non-fiction works have been translated into sixteen languages. He is frequently quoted in news articles and appears as a guest commentator on major news outlets.

== Education ==
Paul Levinson graduated from Christopher Columbus High School in the Bronx, attended the City College of New York (CCNY) in the 1960s, and received a BA in journalism from New York University in 1975; an MA in Media Studies from The New School in 1976; and a PhD from New York University in media ecology in 1979. His doctoral dissertation, Human Replay: A Theory of the Evolution of Media (1979), was mentored by Neil Postman.

== Published works ==
Levinson writes science fiction, fantasy, and sf/mystery hybrids with philosophical undertones as well as non-fiction about the history and future of communications media, the First Amendment, the importance of space exploration, and popular culture themes. His work has been translated into Chinese, Japanese, Korean, French, Italian, Spanish, Portuguese, Czech, Polish, Romanian, Macedonian, Croatian, Russian, Turkish, Persian, and Arabic. Levinson's recent book, Touching the Face of the Cosmos: On the Intersection of Space Travel and Religion, is an anthology of essays and science fiction stories which he edited with Michael Waltemathe, and his latest novel is It's Real Life: An Alternate History of The Beatles.

Levinson has received multiple nominations for the Hugo, Nebula, Sturgeon, Prometheus, Sidewise, Edgar and Audie Awards. His novella Loose Ends was a 1998 finalist for a Hugo, a Sturgeon, and a Nebula. In 2000, his novel The Silk Code won the Locus Award for Best First Novel of 1999. The central character of The Silk Code, NYPD forensic detective Dr. Phil D'Amato, made his first appearance in Levinson's novelette, "The Chronology Protection Case", (published in Analog magazine, September 1995). D'Amato returned in "The Copyright Notice Case" novelette (Analog, April 1996), "The Mendelian Lamp Case" novelette (Analog, April 1997), and in subsequent novels The Consciousness Plague (2002), and The Pixel Eye (2003). An adaptation of Levinson's "The Chronology Protection Case" (radioplay by Mark Shanahan with Paul Levinson & Jay Kensinger) was nominated by the Mystery Writers of America for the Edgar Award for Best Play of 2002.

His next novel was The Plot To Save Socrates, a time travel story. Entertainment Weekly magazine called it "challenging fun". His subsequent novel was Unburning Alexandria, a sequel to The Plot To Save Socrates. The first two chapters of Unburning Alexandria appeared as a novelette in the November 2008 issue of Analog Science Fiction and Fact, and the expanded novel was published as an e-book in May 2013. The concluding novel in the series, titled Chronica, was published in December 2014.

== Educational and professional activities ==
He has taught at Fordham University since 1998; he has been Professor of communication and media studies since 2000, and was chair of the department from 2002 to 2008. He had previously been Assistant (1977–82) and then Associate (1982–88) Professor at Fairleigh Dickinson University, and had adjunct positions at The New School, Hofstra University, St. John's University, Polytechnic University of New York, Audrey Cohen College and the Western Behavioral Sciences Institute. He has given lectures and keynote addresses at conferences at many universities and authored over 100 scholarly articles.

In 1985 he co-founded Connected Education, offering online courses for Masters credit.

He served as president of the Science Fiction and Fantasy Writers of America from 1998 to 2001.

== Media presentations ==
Levinson has been interviewed more than 500 times on local, national and international television and radio as a commentator on media, popular culture, and science fiction. He is frequently quoted in newspapers and magazines around the world and his op-eds have appeared in such major papers as The Atlanta Journal-Constitution, New York's Newsday, and The New York Sun. He was interviewed in a short weekly spot early Sunday mornings on KNX-AM Radio in Los Angeles, from 2006 to 2008 on media-related news events and popular culture. He has several podcasts and blogs. In April 2009, The Chronicle of Higher Education named him ("PaulLev") one of Twitter's ten "High Fliers".

== Musical and recording activities ==
In the late 1960s and early 1970s, prior to his academic career, Levinson was a songwriter, singer, and record producer with recordings by the Vogues, Donna Marie of the Archies, June Valli, Jimmy Clanton, and Ellie Greenwich. As a radio producer he worked with Murray the K and Wolfman Jack.

He wrote over 100 songs published by major music publishers including Bourne, Chappell, Belwin Mills/Warner Brothers, Bobby Darin's TM Music, and Sunbury/RCA. Recordings of his songs were produced by Ellie Greenwich, Jimmy Wisner, and Paul Leka for other artists. Songs he wrote, performed and/or produced were released on record labels including Columbia, Decca, Philips, Atlantic, Buddah and London Records.

He was principal artist, writer, and producer for Twice Upon a Rhyme, a 1972 LP released on HappySad Records and subsequently re-issued on CD. His song "Hung Up On Love" (co-writer Mikie Harris, produced by Ellie Greenwich and Mike Rashkow) was recorded by his trio The Other Voices and released on Atlantic Records in 1968; it was included in Rhino Handmade's 2004 compilation CD Come to the Sunshine: Soft Pop Nuggets from the WEA Vaults, compiled by Andrew Sandoval. He sang falsetto harmony on many of The Other Voices' recordings.

His songs "Merri Goes Round" and "Looking for Sunsets (In the Early Morning)", both co-written with Ed Fox in the 1970s, were recorded by Sundial Symphony (Robbie Rist and Don Frankel) and released by Big Stir Records in 2019. His recent album of new songs, Welcome Up: Songs of Space and Time, was released by Old Bear Records and Light In The Attic Records in 2020.

== Selected bibliography ==
=== Novels ===
- The Silk Code (1999) Tor Books ISBN 0-312-86823-5
- Borrowed Tides (2001) Tor Books ISBN 0-312-84869-2
- The Consciousness Plague (2002) Tor Books ISBN 0-7653-0098-2
- The Pixel Eye (2003) Tor Books ISBN 0-7653-0556-9
- The Plot To Save Socrates (2006) Tor Books ISBN 0-7653-0570-4
- Unburning Alexandria (2013) JoSara Media ISBN 978-1-56178-012-9
- Chronica (2014) JoSara Media ISBN 978-1-56178-031-0
- It's Real Life: An Alternate History of The Beatles (2024) Connected Editions ISBN 978-1-56178-088-4

=== Non-fiction books ===
- In Pursuit of Truth: Essays on the Philosophy of Karl Popper on the Occasion of his 80th Birthday (editor and contributor) with Forewords by Isaac Asimov and Helmut Schmidt (1982) Humanities Press ISBN 0-391-02609-7
- Mind at Large: Knowing in the Technological Age (1988) JAI Press ISBN 0-89232-816-9
- Electronic Chronicles: Columns of the Changes in our Time (1992) Anamnesis Press ISBN 0-9631203-3-6
- Learning Cyberspace: Essays on the Evolution of Media and the New Education (1995) Anamnesis Press ISBN 0-9631203-9-5
- The Soft Edge: A Natural History and Future of the Information Revolution (1997) Routledge ISBN 0-415-15785-4
- Bestseller: Wired, Analog, and Digital Writings (1999) Pulpless ISBN 1-58445-033-9 [includes fiction and non-fiction]
- Digital McLuhan: A Guide to the Information Millennium (1999) Routledge ISBN 0-415-19251-X
- Realspace: The Fate of Physical Presence in the Digital Age, On and Off Planet (2003) Routledge ISBN 0-415-27743-4
- Cellphone: The Story of the World's Most Mobile Medium (2004) Palgrave Macmillan ISBN 1-4039-6041-0
- New New Media (2009/2012) Penguin/Pearson ISBN 0-205-67330-9; second, revised edition (2012) ISBN 0-205-86557-7
- Touching the Face of the Cosmos: On the Intersection of Space Travel and Religion ed. Paul Levinson & Michael Waltemathe (2015/2016) Connected Editions/Fordham University Press ISBN 978-1-56178-042-6 [includes fiction and non-fiction]
