= Rally cap =

Baseball superstition

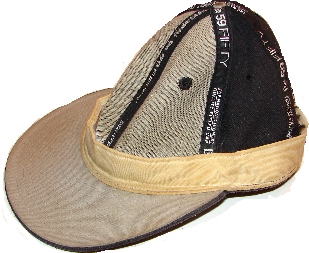
A rally cap

A rally cap is a baseball cap worn inside-out and backwards or in some other unconventional manner by players and/or fans to will a team to a come-from-behind victory late in a game. The rally cap is primarily a baseball superstition but has been adopted in various forms in other sports such as hockey.

== History ==
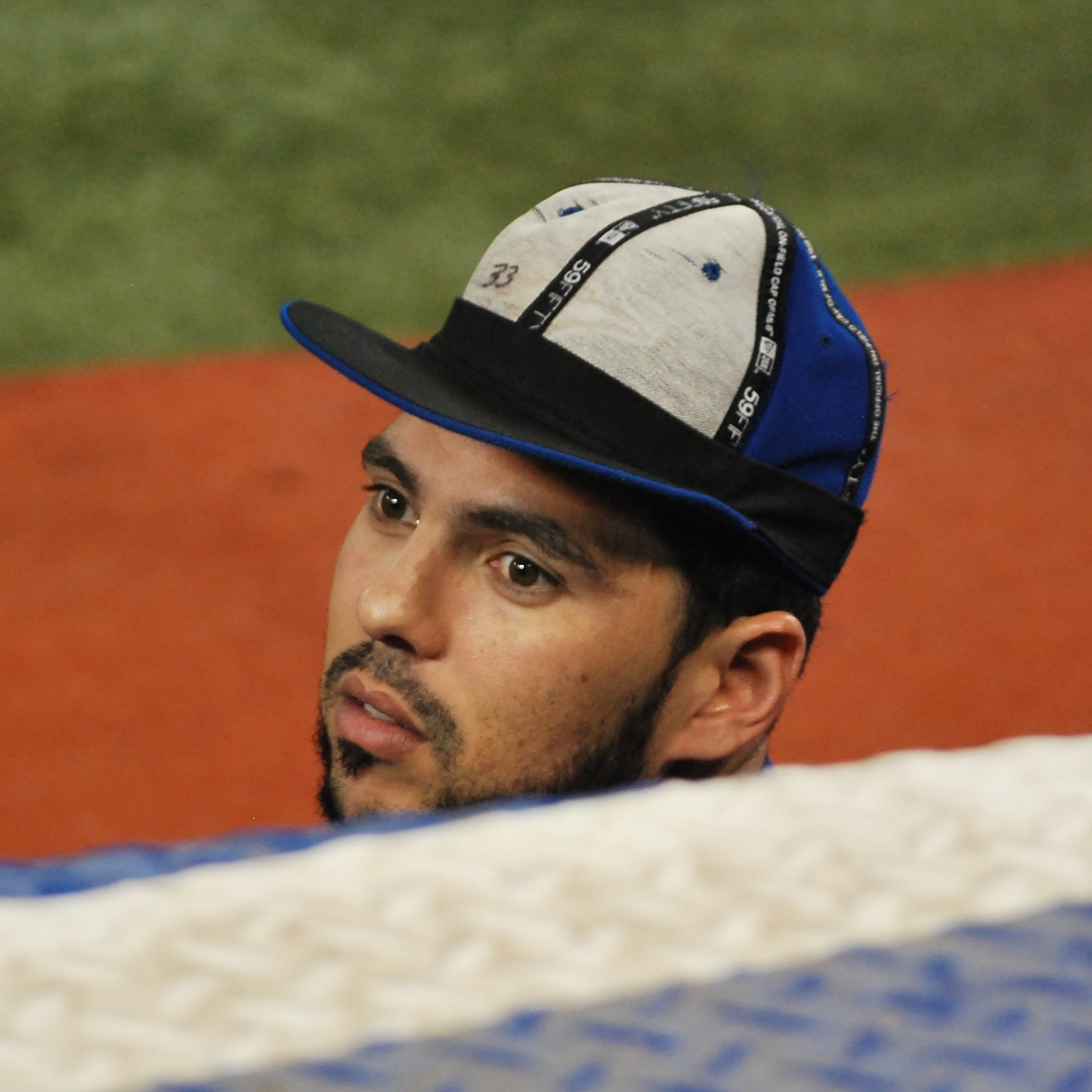
Toronto Blue Jays player Carlos Villanueva wearing a rally cap during a 2012 Major League Baseball game

The original appearance of the rally cap is a subject of some debate. One of the earliest references to the practice comes from an account of an August 23, 1887 game between the New York Giants and the Pittsburgh Alleghenys. The New York Tribune recounts how the Giants mascot "turned his cap inside out" and then outfielder George Gore did the same to bring some luck to the Giants during a close game.

Detroit Tigers fans of the 1940s recall certain players wearing their caps inside-out or in other fanciful ways, but it was not particularly linked to its current usage as a way to urge their teammates to come from behind. The rally cap as a good luck talisman is said to have made its first appearance in the Major Leagues during the 1977 and 1978 Texas Rangers seasons when the team finished second in their division with the rally cap being employed in several of their come-from-behind victories.

However, many fans and baseball writers trace their first awareness of the rally cap to the 1985 Major League Baseball season when fans of the New York Mets, while in attendance at Shea Stadium, occasionally would wear their baseball caps inside-out as a makeshift talisman to generate a come-from-behind victory in the late innings of a baseball game. The superstition spread from the fans to the Mets players themselves and subsequently to fans and players of the opposing teams when the Mets played on the road.

The use of the rally cap rose to national awareness during the 1986 World Series when the New York Mets were playing the Boston Red Sox. The Mets were trailing in Game 6 with the Red Sox leading series three games to two. In the sixth inning of that game, the television cameras showed certain Mets players in the dugout wearing their caps inside-out. In the 10th inning, the Mets were trailing 5–3. The first two batters of the inning were put out on fly outs, putting the Red Sox one out from the title. But the Mets went on to score 3 runs en route to forcing a Game 7, which they won, again on a late comeback.

== Origins of belief ==
Generally speaking, the belief behind the rally cap is to sacrifice a small amount of one's dignity in exchange for a little luck for one's team. It is widely understood that the baseball cap must be one depicting the logo of the team in order to be used as a rally cap.

== Other uses of "rally" items ==
The use of chewing tobacco as a good luck talisman by Major League Baseball players and managers has come to be referred to by some fans as the "rally chew". When the Boston Red Sox came up short against the Tampa Bay Rays in their division in 2008, some blamed Boston Red Sox manager, Terry Francona, and his switch from chewing tobacco to bubble gum.

The Detroit Tigers are said to have resorted to "rally gum" during their 2006 run to the World Series. In Detroit, the superstition began with Nate Robertson chewing massive amounts of bubble gum, sometimes so large that they barely were able to stay in his mouth. It appeared that the more gum he chewed, the better the Tigers’ chances for a comeback. It eventually was picked up by the rest of the pitching staff. Robertson brought it back briefly in 2007 to less effect.

While not its first appearance, the "rally shoe" initially garnered some attention as a yellow Birkenstock on a Seattle Mariners fan's head on October 8, 2022. Once he appeared on the Jumbotron at T-Mobile Park where fans were gathered to watch a playoff game in Toronto, other fans put rally shoes on their heads and the Mariners rallied from a 1–8 loss to win the game 10–9.

== Use in the NHL ==
The rally cap has also been used recently in the National Hockey League in shootout situations. Instead of a traditional cap, however, hockey players will place their helmets on their heads backwards. Marc Savard, during his stay with the Atlanta Thrashers, was the originator of this tradition.

== Use in the media ==
In 2009, General Motors began using the rally cap in their advertising campaigns because they were in serious financial trouble.

== See also ==
- List of hat styles
