= The Plot to Save Socrates =

2006 novel by Paul Levinson

The Plot To Save Socrates
- Author: Paul Levinson
- Language: English
- Genre: Philosophical Science Fiction
- Publisher: Tor Books, New York City
- Publication date: Feb 2006/Feb 2007
- Publication place: United States
- Pages: 266
- ISBN: 0-7653-0570-4 (hardcover); ISBN 0-7653-1197-6 (trade paper)
- OCLC: 61879799
- Dewey Decimal: 813/.54 22
- LC Class: PS3562.E92165 P58 2006

The Plot to Save Socrates is a time travel novel by Paul Levinson, first published in 2006. Starting in the near future, the novel also has scenes set in the ancient world and Victorian New York.

== Summary ==
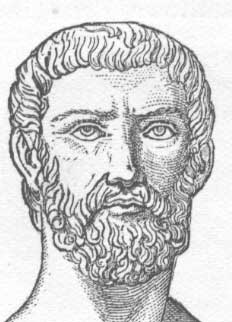
Alcibiades, who got to live a long and eventful life past the moment when history recorded his death

The Plot to Save Socrates deals primarily with the concept of time travel, and while the novel rarely discusses time travel directly, it poses several questions about its validity and possibility (or lack thereof). In particular, the characters are trapped in endless time loops, effectively deprived of free will and having no choice but to take an action which - due to time travel - they already know they have taken.

The story begins in Athens, Greece in 2042 with the main character, Sierra Waters, thinking to herself, at which point the rest of the story begins as a flashback (both in her head and in the sense that the characters constantly flash in and out of historic eras).

Sierra Waters, a graduate student, receives a copy of a previously unknown dialogue in which Socrates is being offered an escape from his death sentence in ancient Athens by a person named Andros offering to take him into the future and leave a clone behind.

The document appears to be genuine, and this takes Sierra onto a path that leads her to a time traveling adventure of her own. On her path she meets up with the great historic inventor Heron of Alexandria but soon realizes that not only is Heron a time traveler himself (from a future later than hers) but is a suspicious and ruthless character. Later on she would encounter the renowned Athenian general Alcibiades, help save his life at the time when history records his death in 404 BC, become his lover and fall deeply in love with him, and help set him on a very extensive and fruitful later long life which would remain unknown to historians.

Together with various fictional characters, the story also involves Plato, and of course Socrates - who only comes onstage in the last part - as well as the 19th Century publisher William Henry Appleton. There are scenes across time, placed in the Ancient Library of Alexandria, Victorian New York City, and Roman London.

At various points it is mentioned that Sierra Waters would eventually become the famous mathematician Hypatia of Alexandria. This theme is taken up in a sequel, Unburning Alexandria, of which the first two chapters were published as a standalone novelette in the November 2008 issue of Analog Science Fiction and Fact. The full-length novel was published as a trade paperback and ebook in 2013, followed by the next novel in the series, Chronica, in December 2014.

== Reception ==
Publishers Weekly found it "light (and) engaging", but warned that because of the constant use of time travel, "the plot threatens to fracture".

In Strange Horizons, Colin Harvey praised it as "delightfully old-fashioned", with a "cool, spare style" which he compared to that of Isaac Asimov; Harvey did, however, consider that the first half of the novel was "almost too bloodless", and overall noted its excessive infodumping, and characters who "accept the idea of time travel a little too readily" and show "too little fear". SF Signal lauded the intricate plotting (wishing for "a time-map of the leap-frogging made by the [characters], just to [see] its carefully crafted structure"), but observed that this came at the cost of characterization, emphasizing that Heron's motivation seems unclear and contradictory, and that Sierra's relationship with Alcibiades "somehow seemed unjustified".

== Publication history ==
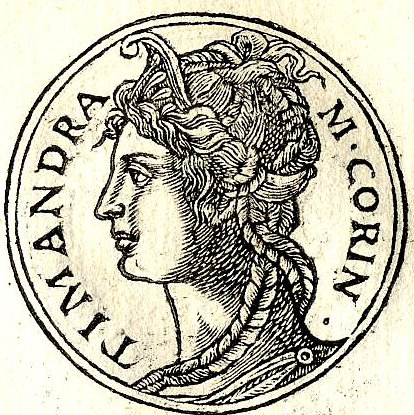
Timandra, mistress of Alcibiades - according to the book, she was actually a time traveler from the 21st century

The Plot to Save Socrates was edited by David G. Hartwell and published by Tor Books. The first edition appeared in February 2006, and went into its third printing in August 2006. A trade paperback edition was released on February 20, 2007; an ebook "author's cut" with an extended ending was released on December 11, 2012.

== See also ==
- Time travel in fiction
- Fiction set in Ancient Greece
