= Glossary of English-language idioms derived from baseball =

This is an alphabetical list of common English-language idioms based on baseball, excluding the extended metaphor referring to sex, and including illustrative examples for each entry. Particularly American English has been enriched by expressions derived from the game of baseball.

See also the Glossary of baseball terms for the jargon of the game itself, as used by participants, fans, reporters, announcers, and analysts of the game.

== B ==
=== ballpark ===
Ballpark, in the ballpark, ballpark figure, and out of the ballpark — "Ballpark" has been used to mean a broad area of approximation or similarity, or a range within which comparison is possible; this usage the Oxford English Dictionary dates to 1960. Another meaning, "sphere of activity or influence", is cited in 1963. "In the (right) ballpark", meaning "within reasonable bounds" dates to 1968. A "ballpark figure" or "ballpark estimate", one that is reasonably accurate, dates to at least 1957. The meaning of "out of the ball park" is to hit a home run; its non-baseball equivalent is to do something well or exactly as it should be done.

"'They said Itanium would never be their fastest 32-bit processor, but it would be in the ballpark. The original x86 hardware execution mechanism was not in the ballpark. It was barely in the parking lot around the ballpark,' Brookwood said.' – Nathan Brookwood, quoted by Stephen Shankland, CNET, 23 April 2003.

"Patrick Wiles, a vice president of First Pioneer Farm Credit in Riverhead, said the 'ballpark figure' for prime vineyard land on the North Fork is $50,000 to $60,000 an acre, 'assuming the development rights have been sold.'" – Howard G. Goldberg, The New York Times, 18 July 2004.

MSNBC said Hillary knocked it "out of the park". – Randy Stelly and Carol Forsloff, New America Media, 27 August 2008.

=== batting 1000 ===
Also batting a thousand. Getting everything in a series of items right. In baseball, someone with a batting average of one thousand (written as 1.000) has had a hit for every at bat in the relevant time period (e.g., in a game). AHDI dates its non-baseball usage to the 1920s. May also be used sarcastically when someone is getting everything wrong.

"'But Boston Scientific also needs to hope that a rare event does not become magnified,' he said. 'It has to be pretty much batting a thousand for a time,' he said". — Reed Abelson, The New York Times, 27 July 2004.

=== beanball, or throw a beanball ===
To attack an opponent by aiming at their head. In baseball, a beanball is a pitch intentionally thrown at a batter's head. In politics, it can be a verbal assault or a policy that is targeted to seriously hurt a particular opponent or group.

headline: "Senator Jim Bunning Throws Beanball at America's Unemployed" – Mason Lerner, The Faster Times, 26 February 2010.

[Note: Then-Sen. Bunning had an established career as a Major League Baseball pitcher prior to running for public office.]

"But Brown and Whitman didn't swing at the questions, instead choosing to stick to a game of political beanball — trading jabs on Whitman's housekeeper, a Brown aide's "whore" remark and even verbal miscues. – Steven Luo, California Beat, 13 October 2010.

=== big hitter(s) ===
At the highest level; used as a noun ("He is a big hitter").

=== big league(s) ===
At the highest level; used as a noun ("You're in the big leagues now") or an adjective ("big-league lawyer"). OED cites "big league" as specifically American Major League Baseball, and cites its first use in 1899; the non-baseball use appears in 1947. Synonym: major league. Contrast bush league, below.

"For a listener who last heard the New Haven Symphony in the mid-60's, in a game but scrappy performance of Britten's War Requiem, its concert on Friday evening was a happy surprise. Under its music director, Michael Palmer, it sounded for the most part like a big-league band, at home in a big-league setting". — James Oestreich, The New York Times, 25 January 1994.

=== bleachers ===
Bleachers (North American English), or stands, are raised, tiered rows of benches found at sports-fields and at other spectator events. Stairways provide access to the horizontal rows of seats, often with every other step enabling access to a row of benches.

The open seating area in baseball was called the "bleaching boards" as early as 1877. The term "bleachers" used in the sense of benches for spectators can be traced back to at least 1889; named as such because the generally uncovered wooden boards were "bleached by the sun".

The Dickson Baseball Dictionary lists as a secondary definition the fans sitting in them. By the early 1900s, the term "bleachers" was being used for both the seating area and its occupants.

In modern usage, the term "bleachers", which is not used outside North America, almost always refers only to the seating area, and those sitting there may be called "bleacher fans" or "bleacherites". Terms such as Chicago's "bleacher bums" or Yankee Stadium's Bleacher Creatures are also used.

=== brand new ballgame ===
In baseball, when a team that has been behind in runs ties up the game, it is sometimes said to be a brand new ballgame. This does not mean that the game starts over from the first inning; it only means that neither team is ahead, and the game continues. In other realms, the term is used to connote a change in tactics or who is ahead in a competition.

"It's a Brand New Ballgame for Outsourcing Real Estate" — John C. Maher, National Real Estate Investor, 1 July 2005.

"Brand new ball game: New peanut program brings change" — Paul L. Hollis, Southwest Farm Press, 21 March 2002.

=== brush back ===
To subvert or threaten verbally. In baseball, a brushback pitch is any pitch intended to establish a pitcher's command of the inside portion of the strike zone, usually involving throwing a pitch at or near a hitter who may be covering that portion of the strike zone. Its baseball usage is cited in many dictionaries, but its transition to the vernacular has yet to be dated.

"The Washington Times' George Archibald reports that Gerald A. Reynolds, assistant secretary for civil rights in the Department of Education, has sent a long overdue brush-back letter to college and university officials concerning their odious and oppressive campus speech codes". — David Limbaugh,The Washington Times, August 19, 2003.

"One spokeswoman, Andrea Saul, has been throwing brushback pitches at reporters who write about Romney's faith, asking if they would write similar stories about Jews". – Jeffrey Goldberg, Bloomberg News, June 18, 2012.

=== bush league ===
Amateur, unsophisticated, unprofessional. From the baseball term "bush league" for a second-rate baseball league and therefore its players (as in bush-league pitcher etc.). OED cites its first baseball use as 1906 (although there are uses as early as 1896), non-baseball in 1914. Contrast big league, above.

"Kinsley, who does come off as the stereotypical Los Angeles-hating East Coast wonk, said recently that because L.A. is the second biggest city in the country, 'it's really bush league to care about where the writers are from.'"— Catherine Seipp, National Review, March 24, 2005.

== C ==
=== Charley horse ===
Sudden stiffness or a cramp in the leg. The etymology of "charley horse" is unknown; CDS cites its first use c. 1887 as baseball slang; OED states such cramps occur "especially in baseball players" and cites this usage to 1888.

"Tried on more than 1,400 patients for almost two years, it has proved effective for many kinds of pain in the muscles and around joints — charley horse, tennis elbow, stiff neck, torticollis ('wryneck'), whiplash injury, muscular rheumatism, and muscle pain resulting from slipped disks". — Time, 8 June 1959

=== cleanup hitter ===
Someone who comes in to solve a problem or lead a team. In baseball a cleanup hitter is the fourth man in the batting order, typically a slugger who is expected to clear the bases by driving other runners home to score runs. The OED first attributes "cleanup hitter" or "cleanup man" in its modern baseball usage to 1922.

Under the headline "Merrill's cleanup hitter: new position focuses on quality of research," it is stated that "at Merrill Lynch & Co. Inc., the "buy," "sell" and "hold" buck stops with William J. Genco".

Under the headline "Trimeris Gets a Cleanup Hitter," it is stated that "Yesterday, tiny drug developer Trimeris (Nasdaq: TRMS) announced that it finally found a permanent CEO to help get itself in order following the resignation of its former leader a year ago.

Referring to President George W. Bush: "There is a reason he is the current president and it is not just because of his Daddy or money — I think he makes a pretty solid cleanup hitter for the Republican Party and brought home the points made during the previous 4 days of the convention".

=== closer ===
In baseball, a "closing pitcher" or "closer" is brought in to finish the game. In business, the person brought in to close the deal, get things done.

=== cover one's bases ===
Also cover all the bases. To ensure safety; to take all relevant details, problems, or exigencies into account, even unlikely ones. In baseball, a defensive player covers a base by standing close to it, ensuring a runner cannot reach it safely. In business, covering one's bases means being prepared for every contingency. Mentioned but not dated by Oxford University Press.

"Arson investigators sifted through the rubble of an Airdrie Stud barn today, but failed to determine the cause of a fire that killed 15 thoroughbred broodmares and yearlings Saturday night. The horses were worth more than $1 million, according to Brereton Jones, owner of the 3,000-acre (12 km^{2}) stud farm. 'We do not have any reason to believe it was arson, but you just want to be sure you cover all the bases,' he said". — Associated Press, in The New York Times, 7 January 1985.

"Cisco's FastHub 400 series has the bases covered".

=== curveball, curve ===
As in "He really threw me a curveball". A surprise, often completely and totally unexpected, and usually unpleasant. The curveball is a pitch in baseball designed to fool the batter by curving unexpectedly. AHDI dates this usage to the mid-20th century.

"Because of my personal story, I'm very interested in illness. One thing we discovered as a family is that when you're thrown a curveball like cancer or multiple sclerosis, often people do not know what to do first". – Meredith Vieira, quoted by Jeff Chu, Time, 27 August 2006.

"Desormeaux chalked up the latest loss, his second so close to the Triple Crown, to another twist in a life so full of them. 'Life throws curves,' he said, 'Some of us hit it, and some of us will sulk around. We've continued to hit the curveball'". – The New York Times, 8 June 2008.

== D ==
=== doubleheader ===
A "doubleheader" is two contests (or similar events) held on the same day with the same participants.

"The city's three mayoral candidates finished Wednesday's political double header with a debate at First Congregational United Church for Christ. ...The evening debate did not differ greatly from the luncheon forum that local Rotarians and Kiwanians hosted earlier in the day" — Andrew Edwards, Contra Costa Times, 21 October 2009

=== down to the last out ===
To be near the end of a competition and have just one last chance to succeed. Also sometimes expressed as "down to the last strike."

"Hillary Clinton is now down to her last out".

=== ducks on the pond ===
In baseball, "ducks on the pond" occurs when having runners in scoring position, ready for a batter to drive them home. In business, "a situation with a good chance to succeed".

== E ==
=== extra innings ===
To extend the original time allotted in order to break a tie or settle an issue. In baseball, this means going beyond the standard nine-inning length of a game.

headline: "Extra Innings for the Cloned Food Debate" – Pallavi Gogoi, Bloomberg Businessweek, 2 April 2007

headline: "Microsoft, Yahoo Game Going Into Extra Innings?" – Erika Morphy, E-Commerce Times, 5 June 2008

== F ==
=== first base ===
In baseball, a batter hopes to reach first base and then continue around second and third bases before reaching home and scoring a run. In interpersonal relations, an individual who cannot get to first base with another person is unable to achieve some initial goal or to establish a relationship. A kiss might be first base in a romantic relationship. (See Baseball metaphors for sex.) Getting an appointment with a potential customer might be first base in a business transaction or negotiation.

Under the headline, "Getting Past First Base," a writer asks: "How do you turn an initial contact with a prospect into a fully-fledged business relationship? It's the essence of sales – but it's an area where many people really struggle". — Ian Brodie, 8 November 2008.

=== first inning or early innings ===
The early stages of a competition. A game of baseball typically lasts nine innings, so the first inning or the early innings (the first three innings) often do not determine the outcome. Also see "Ninth inning" (below).

headline: "Geithner: Tax reform debate in 'first inning'" — Bernie Becker, The Hill, 27 January 2011.

headline: "Early Innings of a Banking Recovery" — Duncan Frearson, Smith Street Capital, July 13, 2010.

=== foot in the bucket ===
To act in a timid or cowardly fashion. A batter who steps away from home plate with his leading foot (usually in fear of being struck by a pitched ball) instead of a straight-ahead stride is said to "step in the bucket".

"Even if you haven't stepped in the bucket yet, you may one day. So here are Be Better Guys' Tips for Handling a Screw Up at Work" – Be Better Guys: A Guy's Guide to Getting a Life, 17 June 2009.

=== four-bagger ===
A complete success; compare home run, below. In baseball, "four-bagger" is another term for a home run, since the batter who hits a home run touches all four bags or bases, including home plate. A "four-bagger" in baseball may also mean any combination of hits and errors in one at-bat where the batter touches all four bases (a triple and an error, for example, a double and a two-base error, a single and a three-base error, or four-base error).

Referring to the prospects of a high-tech company, a headline reads, "Is Netflix a Four-Bagger in the Making"?

== G ==
=== grand slam ===
Any sudden, sweeping victory. A batter who hits a home run with bases loaded has hit a four-run "grand slam," a term originally borrowed from contract bridge for winning thirteen tricks. Aside from baseball, the term now refers to a situation which may or may not end badly for the protagonist but from which they emerge as an obvious winner. The term also can refer to anything good which comes in four parts, such as a "grand slam breakfast."

headline: "Natural Gas in Bear Market 'Grand Slam'" – Patti Domm, Market Insider, CNBC, 11 February 2011.

headline: "Boeing Hits Grand Slam with Four DoD Deals" – John Adams, GovconWire, 7 September 2010.

=== grandstanding ===
In baseball, a player who shows off or showboats to win the favor of the fans (in the grandstand) is said to be grandstanding. In other contexts, including politics, playing to the crowd, the audience, or the media might be described as grandstanding.

"Tellem weighed in with a thoughtful back-page article in this Sunday's New York Times regarding the recent Congressional and mainstream media grandstanding over steroids". — Jay Jaffe, Futility Infielder, 5 April 2005.

headline: "Stop the grandstanding on the debt ceiling!" — CNN Money, 5 January 2011.

"Opinions were varied and passionate, but there was no sniping, no partisan grandstanding." — Alex Williams, The New York Times, June 22, 2012.

=== ground ball ===
A prosaic or ordinary accomplishment, beneath higher hopes or expectations. In baseball, a ground ball is a batted ball that bounces or rolls on the ground, perhaps for a base hit, perhaps for an out.

"Sony once hit home runs, but now it's lost its touch," said Akihiko Jojima, an analyst and author of the book Sony's Sickness. "Sony still makes competent products but they're all just boring ground balls." — Hiroko Tabuchi, New York Times, 28 March 2010.

== H ==
=== hardball, play hardball ===
To be or act tough or aggressive. Refers to the comparison between balls in baseball and softball. As a synonym for baseball, OED dates this use of "hardball" to 1883; its non-baseball use appears in 1973.

"Hauser would like to extend its three-year contract with Bristol-Myers, becoming a supplier of the material for semi-synthetic Taxol. 'I think this is just tough bargaining,' said Deborah Wardwell of Dain Bosworth Securities. 'It seems to suggest hardball tactics.'" — Milt Freudenheim, The New York Times, 10 January 2007.

=== heavy hitter ===
A powerful or commanding person, a leader. In baseball a heavy hitter is a slugger, someone who hits a lot of extra-base hits or home runs. In business, the heavy hitters may be those who draw the most clients or make the most sales, or who lead the organization. In politics a heavy hitter draws crowds or has a lot of power or influence.

headline: "Heavy-hitters line up for Hong Kong Tourism pitch".

headline: "Boeing uses him as its heavy hitter. As it's done with other troubled programs, the company is relying on Patrick Shanahan to get the 787 back on track" — Los Angeles Times, 24 February 2008.

headline: "UW Adds Heavy Hitters from High Tech and Biotech to Turn More Ideas Into Companies".

=== hit it out of the park ===
Also knock it out of the park. To achieve complete or even a spectacular success; compare home run, below. A home run is automatically scored when a batter strikes the ball with such force as to hit it out of the stadium or playing field.

"11:55 AM: Kerry stumbled over the question of whether God is on America's side. But Edwards hit it out of the park with his anecdote about Abraham Lincoln saying America is on God's side. He is the more nimble debater and conversationalist". — Katherine Q. Seelye, The New York Times, 29 February 2004.

=== hit singles ===
See "singles".

=== home run ===
A complete success (opposite of strike out); often used in the verb phrase "hit a home run". OED cites this usage to 1965.

"HGTV caught on quickly, and is now carried in 90 million homes. The Food Network has been a home run as well, luring viewers interested in cooking". — Geraldine Fabrikant, The New York Times, 14 August 2006.

"It was Silver's later, 15-month training period with the Apollo 15 astronauts, and that crew's brilliant geological performance on the lunar plain between the Apennine Mountains and Hadley Rille, a sinuous gorge, that, in Silver's words, "hit a home run."" — Marcy Drexler, Caltech News, 1999.

== I ==
=== inside baseball ===
Within the sport, "inside baseball" refers to the stratagems that managers use to get their team to score runs, perhaps not as obvious as simply getting players to hit home runs or to catch the ball, but to do the little things that move runners towards home plate. Akin to the idea of small ball. Outside the game, "inside baseball" may refer to the behind-the-scenes machinations of politicians, bankers, or other professionals.

under the headline "Dana Milbank's Inside Baseball," a news story begins: "With a few deft strokes and in fewer than 25 inches, Dana Milbank draws behind-the-scenes portraits of Washington power with such dexterity and hilarity that his Washington Sketch column is a must-read for anyone who wants to know how politics in this city really works". – Brigid Schulte, The Washington Post, 2 March 2010.

"I once had to hire a writer to create my firm's brochure, because what I did was far too "inside baseball." Meaning, too focused on the details only an insider could love and not enough on what the audience wanted to know".

=== "It ain't over till it's over!" ===
A famous quotation from baseball player and manager Yogi Berra; one of many yogiisms. Berra used it in 1973, while managing the New York Mets, to mean a team is not out of the pennant race until they are mathematically eliminated. In sports, it is usually used to mean that a game is not officially over until time expires or the final out is registered, and that the players need to stay mentally focused until that point, particularly when their team has a large lead but there is sufficient time for the opposing team to come back and win. The original and self-evident adage, misstated by Berra, is "The game is not over until the last man is out." In non-sports contexts, the quotation means that one should not assume a dangerous or disadvantageous situation has ended or passed until this has been confirmed by other events.

"In spite of last winter's nice snowpack and a wet summer, here's the bad news about New Mexico's drought: It ain't over till it's over, and it ain't over". — Staci Matlock, The New Mexican, 9 October 2005.

=== "It's like déjà vu all over again!" ===
Another famous (attributed) yogiism; a redundant way of saying "Here we go again!" It has come into general usage to describe any situation that seems to be observably repeating itself.

"Kay told CNN he is worried because he's hearing some of the same signals about Iran and its nuclear program that were heard as the Bush administration made its case for the war in Iraq. 'It's déjà vu all over again,' Kay said". — David Kay, former U.S. chief weapons inspector (quote).

== K ==
=== knock it out of the park ===
See hit it out of the park.

=== knock the cover off the ball ===
To succeed beyond expectation. Derived from the act of hitting the ball exceptionally hard, so as to make the leather covering come off. Tearing the cover off the ball was possible in the early days of baseball, since a single ball was often used for the entire game (as is the case in the game of cricket). The phrase was used in a newspaper account of a baseball game as early as 1866.

"In the last two quarters, we knocked the cover off the ball. . . . We exceeded analysts' expectations on Wall Street and our own guidance in both quarters".

== L ==
=== late innings ===
See "ninth inning".

=== leadoff hitter ===
In baseball, a leadoff hitter is the player who bats first in the lineup. It can also refer to any batter who bats first in an inning. In other fields of endeavor, the leadoff hitter is the one who goes first in a series.

headline: "The American Patriot Program announces August leadoff hitters for its national campaign".

"The decision to place Ms. Obama centre stage in Denver is something of a gamble; rarely have the spouses of presidential candidates played leadoff hitter in such a high-stakes political exercise".

=== left field ===
As in "come out of left field". Unusual, unexpected, or irrational. In baseball, the fielders are focused on home plate, which is the place from which they expect balls to be hit to them. If a ball (e.g., one that was previously hit into the stands) or some other object is thrown at the fielder or onto the field from the outfield seats behind them, it is unexpected and surprising. This may be the origin of the expression "out of left field." First used in the idiomatic sense in the early 20th century by song pluggers working in the American music industry to indicate an unexpectedly successful song.

"Depp's performance came out of left field in The Curse of the Black Pearl; nobody had ever thought of channeling Keith Richards and Pepé Le Pew before". — Kent Williams, Isthmus: The Daily Page.

== M ==
=== major league ===
At the highest level. Synonym: big league.

"When you've landed a tenure-track position at that university, you're playing in the major leagues."

=== Mendoza Line ===
A line marking a very poor performance or the threshold for barely competent performance, referring to the Mendoza Line of a .200 batting average in baseball.

"Over the last five years, Wall Street analysts have only been right once. They're below the Mendoza line, batting just 200. And they're misleading investors again" — Brit Ryle, Taipan Financial News, 13 December 2005.

=== Murderers' Row ===
A large group of talented individuals or valuable assets. Most notably used to describe the 1927 New York Yankees, who had fearsome hitters throughout their line-up, although it was used to describe other baseball teams as early as 1905.

"He was the unexpected underdog who comes out of nowhere and starts landing one uppercut after another into the chins of a murderer's [sic] row of 800-pound gorillas." — Andrew Leonard, Salon.com, 10 March 2008.

Headline: "Here's The Murderers' Row Of Talent Bill Simmons Recruited For His New Site" — Noah Davis, Business Insider, 2 June 2011.

== N ==
=== ninth inning ===
An expression that an event or process is near the end – in the last of a nine-inning game. Referring to a trend in market expansion, a financial analyst may say "We're in the eighth or ninth inning". During a seemingly never-ending crisis, an analyst might remark "No Ninth Inning for Credit Crisis". The president of an academic association may title his farewell column to the members "A Ninth-Inning Farewell".

"'We're in the late innings for U.S. small-cap stocks,'" said Richard Bernstein, chief investment strategist at Merrill Lynch & Co." – Wall Street Journal, 31 December 2007.

== O ==
=== o-fer ===
Also oh-fer. If a baseball batter gets 0 hits in any number of at-bats in a game, he's said to go "oh for" that number (as in 0-3, said as "Oh for three"), or perhaps even more colloquially, to "have an o-fer". In business, an example of an "o-fer" would be to try repeatedly and fail to make any sales.

Under the headline "Senate Dems go O-fer," it is reported: "The Senate just voted on whether to proceed with four budgets: the House 2012 budget, the Toomey budget, the Paul budget, and President Obama's 2012 proposal. All were voted down".

=== off base ===
Unawares or by surprise, usually in the phrase "caught off base"; OED dates to 1935. Can also mean misguided, mistaken, or working on faulty assumptions; this usage dates to 1940. Both of these uses derive from the situation of a runner being away from a base and thus in a position to being put out (1872).

"The absence of any sharp new angle, any strong new drive in Mr. Roosevelt's messages reflected the fact that he and his Cabinet (only Messrs. Hull, Murphy, Woodring, Edison and Ickes were at hand) had been caught off-base with the rest of the world by the Hitler-Stalin deal, the sudden push for Poland". — Time, 3 September 1939.

"Lotte Ulbricht replied that Madame Yang was way off base. No one was demanding that oppressed nations live happily with their oppressors, she said, and added that Russia was, as always, 'wholeheartedly behind the revolutionary struggles of colonial peoples.'" — Time, 5 July 1963.

=== on deck ===
Next in line to face a particular challenge. In baseball, a batter emerges from the dugout and loosens up "on-deck" just before his turn to face the pitcher. OED mentions usage of "on deck" first in 1867 in the context of baseball ("on deck fig. [orig. U.S.]: at hand; ready for action; alive; in Baseball, next at the bat, with the right or privilege of batting next".)

headline: "Barletta, 0-2, back on deck" – Roderick Random, Scranton Times, 30 May 2009.

lede: "With no one else as formidable, Republicans are pressuring the Hazleton mayor [Barletta] to run against the longtime Democratic congressman next year". – Scranton Times, 30 May 2009.

headline: "Loren French is On Deck to Speak to Us at EntConnect 2007!" – A Better Blogsite, 1 February 2007

=== one base at a time ===
In baseball, a manager may adopt a strategy of moving runners along one base at a time rather than emphasizing power hitting and high-scoring innings. In other walks of life, such a step-by-step approach may also be referred to as a "one base at a time" approach.

"Organizations instead need a deep bench of players with varying capabilities and a clear strategy for advancing ideas one base at a time. That's what puts runs on the scoreboard and delivers value to members or customers".

headline: "For RNA polymerase, it's one base at a time".

=== out of left field ===
See left field.

=== out of one's league ===
Above someone's status, talents, or capabilities. In baseball, professional leagues are classified according to their level of play and quality of talent, with Major League Baseball being the highest level of play and the various leagues comprising Minor League Baseball ranked below. If a player is competing in a league above their level of ability, they are said to be "out of their league". This idiom is particularly applied to dating and romantic relationships, in which a person is attempting to date someone who is more accomplished, better-looking, or wealthier than themselves.

"He (or she) is too tall, too attractive, too smart, too funny, too ambitious or just too plain awesome to be interested in you, right? Wrong. I've come to the realization that no one is truly "out of my league," and here's why."

== P ==
=== pinch hit ===
To act as a substitute or stand-in for someone when in a "pinch", especially in an emergency. In baseball, sometimes a substitute batter would be brought in, especially at a crucial point in the game. The Oxford English Dictionary gives the first non-baseball use in 1918, from sports columnist and short-story writer Ring Lardner:

"He had the thing running, with a piece of common binding twine pinch-hitting for the cord." — Ring Lardner, My Four Weeks In France, viii.179 (1918).

=== pitch a shutout ===
To not allow an opponent any wins. In baseball, a shutout occurs when a pitcher does not allow the opponent any runs.

"The Republican Party pitched a shutout in the South in 2000 and 2004".

=== play ball ===
To get going, or to start. Before every baseball game, and after a dead ball situation such as a foul ball or a time-out, the umpire traditionally shouts "play ball" in order to (re-)start the game. AHDI dates this usage to the late 19th century. An alternative meaning, "to cooperate", is not explicitly connected to baseball by ADHI, but is so derived by the Cambridge Dictionary of American Idioms.

"'Eight U.S. attorneys who did not play ball with the political agenda of this administration were dropped from the team,' said Senate Democratic Whip Dick Durbin of Illinois".

=== play softball ===
To ask easy questions. Perhaps the opposite of playing hardball (baseball) or throwing difficult or probing questions at a respondent.

== R ==
=== rain-check (rain-cheque) ===
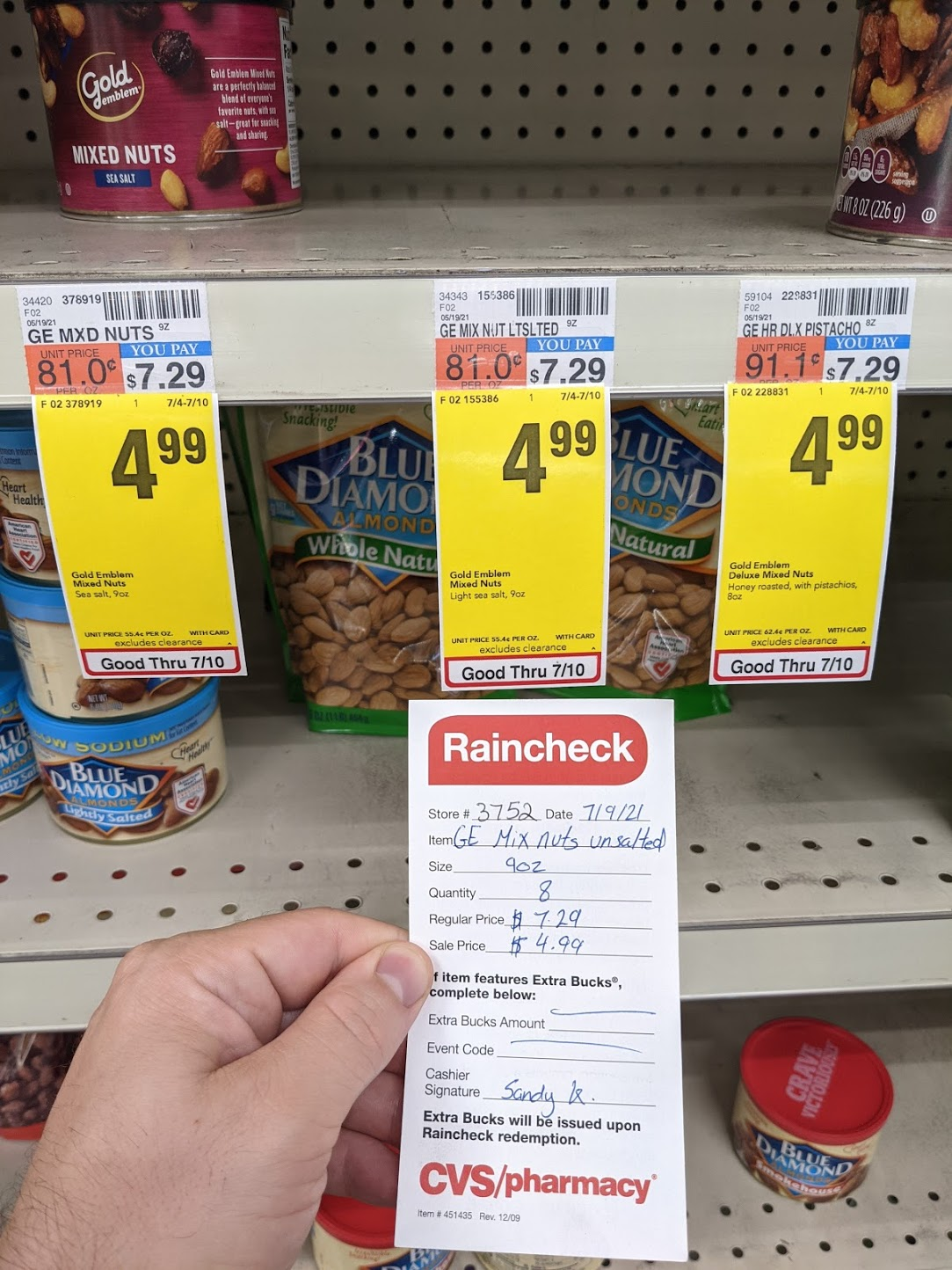
A rain check at CVS, shown below the empty shelf for the sold-out item. This rain check never expires, as opposed to the original sale.

Originally, a ticket given to a spectator at an outdoor event providing for admission at a later date (in lieu of a refund of entrance money), should the event be interrupted by rain.

Figuratively, an assurance of a deferral or extension of an offer, especially an assurance that a customer can take advantage of a deal or sale later because the item or service offered is temporarily not available (as by being sold out); or a (sometimes vague) promise to reissue or accept a social offer at an unnamed later date. The two latter meanings derive from the first, which dates at least to 1877 – see rain check (baseball) – and metaphorical usage dates to at least 1896 – see rain check.

"To deal with frustration among holiday shoppers hunting for its Wii game console, Nintendo Co. and retailer GameStop Corp. are launching a rain check program". — Tribune wires, Chicago Tribune, 19 December 2007.

"Another scheduled member of the party, Pat McKenna, White House doorkeeper for thirty-five years, was prevented from making the trip due to an illness in his immediate family, but the President said at his press conference today that he had given McKenna a rain check on the next cruise." — "Roosevelt starts for ocean cruise." The New York Times, April 30, 1938.

=== rally cap ===
In baseball, a rally cap is a baseball cap worn while inside-out and/or backwards or in another unconventional manner by players or fans, in order to will a team into a come-from-behind rally late in the game. The rally cap is primarily a baseball superstition. The term may also be used by other groups, such as stock market traders.

headline: "Muni Market Traders Keep Their Rally Caps On" – Patrick McGee, The Bond Buyer, 15 April 2011.

=== relief pitcher ===
In baseball a relief pitcher comes in as a replacement for the starting pitcher or another relief pitcher. A relief pitcher in other realms of activity also comes in as a substitute or replacement for the initial or regular occupant of a role.

"Vincent B. Orange doesn't see himself as an opportunist. Rather, he's more of a 'relief pitcher' with the chops to push the District's business goals, he said, after council member Harry Thomas Jr. relinquished control of the Committee on Economic Development while he fights a lawsuit accusing him of taking public funds for personal use".—The Washington Times, 9 June 2011.

=== rhubarb ===
A heated argument or noisy dispute; especially, between players on a playing field. Originally the word traditionally muttered by actors in a play to provide background noise. Online Etymology Dictionary attributes the "loud squabble on the field" usage to broadcaster Garry Schumacher in 1938, while OED and CDS both credit sportscaster Red Barber at a baseball game in 1943. OED's first non-baseball cite is 1949.

"If the theater people won their point, it was not much of a point to win. The entire rhubarb, after all, was about nothing but money". — Time, 7 June 1963.

=== right off the bat ===
From the very first; immediately; without any delay. The Oxford English Dictionary dates this term to 1914 in Maclean's, a Canadian magazine. An older term, "hot from the bat", dates to the 1888 play Meisterschaft by Mark Twain.

"'It was very clear right off the bat that the loss of Cdk5 made them have a much stronger associative memory,' Professor Bibb said". — Reuters, The New York Times, 29 May 2007.

== S ==
=== "Say it ain't so, Joe!" ===
An expression of disbelief. A reference to the Black Sox scandal, in which several members of the Chicago White Sox conspired with gamblers to lose the 1919 World Series on purpose. According to an apocryphal story, when Shoeless Joe Jackson was implicated in the scandal, a young fan approached him and said, "Say it ain't so, Joe!"

=== screwball ===
Eccentric, zany, or crazy; OED dates this usage to 1933. The screwball is a rarely used pitch (because of its effect on the arm) that is intended to behave erratically — it "breaks" in the opposite direction a curveball would break.

"And now, as we enter not only the best season for stocks in the calendar year, but also the very best three quarters in the four-year election cycle, you'd think you should just sit back and enjoy the ride, right? But I'm worried the market may be getting ready to throw us a screwball". – MarketWatch, 16 October 2010.

=== shutout ===
See "pitch a shutout".

=== singles or hit singles ===
To seek modest, or step-by-step gains instead of large ones. In baseball, hitting singles or playing small ball instead of seeking to hit home runs is sometimes a good strategy for teams that do not have many power hitters.

"With the duration [of bonds] tailwind on the wane, investors must literally scour the globe for opportunities, seeking coins and jewels rather than treasure chests. In baseball vernacular, investors must now aim to hit singles rather than swinging for the fences". – Anthony J. Crescenzi, Morningstar.com, 22 December 2010.

=== small ball ===
In modern baseball play and analysis (sabermetrics), small ball refers to a strategy that focuses on gaining a small or step-by-step edge on the opponent not by trying to knock the ball out of the ballpark but instead by getting singles, stealing bases, and moving runners along one base at a time. In other endeavors, a similar focus on the details, winning a few points at a time rather than trying for large gains, may also be described as small ball.

headline: "The president plays small ball" – Charles Krauthammer, The Washington Post, 26 January 2012.

headline: "In Need of a Game Change, Santorum Plays Small Ball" – Nate Silver, The New York Times, 17 March 2012.

=== softball ===
See "play softball".

=== spitball ===
To propose ideas without prejudice.

=== step up to the plate ===
Often shortened to step up. To rise to an occasion in life. Refers to when a player must approach home plate to take a turn at batting. OED cites baseball usage in 1875, general usage in 1919.

headline: "First Responders Stepped Up to the Plate".

headline: "Pig Farmers Have Stepped Up to the Plate".

=== strike ===
As in "strike out", "three strikes, you're out", "a strike against you", "He was born with two strikes against him". In baseball, a strike occurs when the batter swings at and misses a pitch, or when a pitch crosses the strike zone without the batter swinging. A batter with three strikes is out and must stop batting.

The word strike has crept into common English usage to mean a failure, shortcoming, disadvantage, or loss. When a person has "gotten three strikes" or "struck out", they have failed completely. Three-strikes laws are those which require the imposition of a more severe punishment for a criminal with a third conviction. Someone seeking a job, or romance with another person, may "strike out" and fail to impress on a first meeting. Also a swing and a miss.

Headline: "Everybody Struck Out in Marietta Teen Drinking Incident" – Atlanta Journal and Constitution, 25 February 2010.

Having "two strikes against you" means that you have just one remaining chance to succeed at something, or that you are given little chance to succeed, perhaps because you have been prejudged.

"The British bank Barclays has announced its next CEO. But Bob Diamond already seemingly has two strikes against him going in. One thing, he's an American. And number two, he's head of the company's investment banking arm". – American Public Media, "Marketplace", 7 September 2010.

=== strike out swinging ===
To fail despite efforts.

=== strike out looking ===
To fail by being passive, without even making an effort.

=== swing and miss ===
To try but fail, like swinging a bat and missing the ball. Also see "whiff."

"I've swung and missed a lot in my hunt for vintage Levis".

Referring to the disappointing purchase of a living-room couch, "Todd: Hey batter, hey batter, sometimes when you're looking for the rainbow curve away, you get the heater down the middle. Maybe that's why you swung and missed".

"The 1988-2000 employment projections: how accurate were they? In the late 1980s, we projected future employment in scores of occupations for the 1988-2000 period. That future is now the past. See where we scored a hit, landed in the ballpark, and – now and then – swung and missed.

=== swing for the fences ===
To try for a substantial gain; to make a big score. In baseball, to swing for the fences is to try to hit a home run, rather than trying to hit singles or play small ball.

"These are opportunities that traders look for every day. That many of them noticed it and swung for the fences all at once is not collusion, it's just the sign of a huge softball coming right down the line".

=== switch hitter ===
Refers to baseball players who are capable of hitting as a left-handed or right-handed batter (OED, 1948). Colloquially, a switch hitter is a bisexual person. More broadly, "switch-hitting" can refer to an ability to perform double functions or roles.

An article titled "Hatteras Plans Switch-Hitting Ethernet" discusses a network switch that can operate either on fiber optic or copper wiring.

== T ==
=== take cuts at someone ===
In baseball, a batter swinging the bat at a ball is sometimes said to "take cuts" at the ball. A person who "takes cuts" at somebody else may be taking a verbal swing or striking a blow at the person's reputation.

headline: "Ex-teammates take cuts at A-Rod".

headline: "Opponents Sure to Take Cuts at Stadium Votes in Anaheim Political Game"

=== three strikes law ===
See Strike.

=== took the collar ===
From the phrase for failing to get any hits; can be used to indicate failure at something.

Referring to the competition between the Denver Post and the Rocky Mountain News: "The News, you recall, took the collar as the 'failing newspaper' when the two sought Justice Department approval in 2000 to merge their business operations".

=== touch base(s) ===
As in "we will touch base(s) at the meeting". To make contact with someone, to inform someone of one's plans or activities, perhaps in anticipation of an event. In baseball, a player who is touching a base is not in danger of being put out. Another explanation is that a player must briefly touch each of the bases in order after hitting a home run. It may also refer to the fact that after a fly ball has been caught for an out, a runner on base who has taken a lead, or is standing off his base towards the next base, must go back to touch or tag that base ("tag up") before he can advance to the next one.

"Trevor, it's been a while. I'd like to touch bases with you next week to discuss our quarterly sales targets."

"We'll touch base again before we leave."

=== triple play ===
In baseball, a triple play is the rare act of making three outs during the same continuous play. The OED attributes the original usage of "triple play" to the American game of baseball as early as 1869.

headline: "President Obama's Wednesday NYC Triple Play." – Celeste Katz, New York Daily News, 26 April 2011.

headline: "Cosmic Triple-Play: Asteroid Flyby, Fireball over Utah, Meteor Shower" – Charles Q. Choi, SPACE.com, 18 November 2009.

== W ==
=== wheelhouse ===
From the term for a batter's power zone, usually waist high and over the middle of the plate. Etymology attributed to Peter Tamony who suggested that batters "wheel" at the ball and "take good, level 'roundhouse' swings."

"Carville also said he had not spoken with Hillary Clinton about Richardson's endorsement, but that he was outraged. 'I doubt if Gov. Richardson and I will be terribly close in the future,' he said, but 'I've had my say. . . . I got one in the wheelhouse and I tagged him.'"

=== whiff ===
In general usage, the word "whiff" may refer to the movement or sound of air or wind, perhaps as an object moves through it. In baseball a whiff is when a batter swings and misses a pitch. Such usage in baseball is attributed by the OED to 1913. Perhaps derived from this, the term "whiff" has also come to mean trying and failing at something. Also see "swing and miss".

"After Richardson whiffed on the question, Joe Biden parked it".

"Yahoo and MSN each whiffed on six questions. There was only one question that baffled all the search engines".

=== whole new ball game ===
Also brand-new ball game, whole different ball game, or whole 'nother ball game. In common usage, a "whole new ball game" or "brand-new ball game" signifies a drastic turn of events, a completely altered situation. In baseball, an announcer says "it's a whole new ball game" when the trailing team ties the score or takes the lead, usually after being behind by several runs. AHDI traces this to the 1960s. A "whole 'nother ball game" signifies something completely unrelated, different, or irrelevant. Also said extensively and out of context in the world of selling ads for trade mags.

Under the headline "It's a Whole New Ballgame for Obama," it is stated, "Barack Obama, we all know by now, is not an ideologue. But where his roots are planted is also nowhere near the progressive pendulum, particularly on domestic issues. Now he's got a playing field that suits his natural political conservatism". – Taylor Marsh, Huffington Post, 7 January 2011.

"In fact, on-demand applications are a whole 'nother ballgame — which is why personally I try to avoid the popular phrase software as a service (SaaS) since I feel it's a phrase that's born of the 'nothing changes' mindset". – Phil Wainewright, ZDNet, 16 March 2006.

== See also ==
- Baseball metaphors for sex
- Glossary of baseball terms
- List of sports idioms
