= Official game (baseball) =

Baseball game longer than nine innings

In baseball, an official game (regulation game in the Major League Baseball rulebook) is a game where nine innings have been played, except when the game is scheduled with fewer innings, extra innings are required to determine a winner, or the game must be stopped before nine innings have been played, e.g. due to inclement weather. The term "official game" is mainly used in the context of a game that is stopped before nine innings have been played, though it has been used for other promotional purposes.

A game that is stopped ("called" in the MLB rulebook) by the umpires before the regulation number of innings have been played may be considered an official game if five innings have been played (4 1/2 innings if the home team is in the lead), unless the game meets one of the conditions for a suspended game. An official game that is stopped in this way is ended at the point of stoppage and statistics are added to each team's totals, while a suspended game is resumed from the point of stoppage at a later time. In some leagues, a game that is stopped before five innings have been played is considered "no game"; statistics accumulated before the stoppage are not counted and replay of the game is subject to the league rules. In MLB, all games stopped before they have become official games are suspended games, and are resumed from the point of stoppage on a later date.

== Inclement weather ==
In the case of inclement weather, any game which has reached this point may be stopped and shortened as needed, with the result being final, and all records and statistics counted. A game which has not reached this point before being stopped is either considered a suspended game (to be continued at a later date from the point of stoppage), or is simply canceled and replayed from the start. (This depends on the rules of each individual league.) In either case, no statistics are counted until the game becomes official.

Since most professional baseball games are nine innings long, the fifth inning is used as the threshold for an official game. If the visiting team is leading, or the game is tied, the end of the fifth inning marks this point. If the home team (which bats last) is already ahead in the score, and theoretically would not need its half of the fifth inning, then 4½ innings (i.e., the middle of the fifth) is considered an official game. The game is also considered official if the home team scores to take the lead in the bottom of the fifth inning, since the game would end immediately if the same thing happened in the ninth. Games that are stopped due to power outages are treated as suspended and cannot be declared official.

In the Major League Baseball postseason (since 2009), all tiebreaker games that are added to the end of the regular season (since 2009), and in the regular season (since 2020), this rule does not apply; all games stopped at any time for weather or power outages are considered suspended and continued from the point of stoppage when play resumes, no matter if the game has reached the end of the fifth inning. This rule was put into place as a result of Game 5 of the 2008 World Series, which was the first postseason game in history to be suspended and resumed from the point of suspension. Prior to the 2009 postseason, a playoff game had to have at least five innings completed in order to be suspendable; a playoff game stopped prior to that point had to be started over.

== Rain check ==
In nearly all cases, the "official game" status is used to determine whether a rain check will be honored for fans holding tickets. If a game is started but does not reach the point of becoming official, fans are entitled to a new ticket for the make-up game or (in most modern cases) any other available game of their choice. If a game is halted after it becomes official, the game is simply shortened and no rain check is given.

== Effects on statistical streaks ==
The "official game" statistic received some attention during the 1995 season, when Cal Ripken Jr. was approaching the record for consecutive games played, previously held by Lou Gehrig. Large numbers were hung on the side of the Baltimore & Ohio Warehouse at Camden Yards at Oriole Park at Camden Yards in Baltimore to show the number of games in Ripken's streak. Each day, a new number was unfurled during the fifth inning after each game had become official (since the statistic would not have counted if the game had been stopped before that point). A similar practice has been used to count down toward the demolition of several stadiums (including Veterans Stadium in Philadelphia in 2003, Busch Memorial Stadium in St. Louis in 2005, and the original Yankee Stadium and Shea Stadium in New York City in 2008 and the conversion of Turner Field to a college football stadium in Atlanta in 2016); as each game became official, the team would unveil a new (lower) number showing the number of games left to be played in the stadium.

== Other sports ==
Other professional sports utilize similar rules regarding "official" games/events.

Most codes of motorsport declare a race "official" with an official result if just three laps are completed, though only half the normal championship points are awarded if less than 75% of the race distance (rounded up to the nearest whole lap) is completed. If more than 75% of the race is completed, full points are awarded.

The major exception applies in the United States, mainly in NASCAR and INDYCAR, where races must go at the next full lap after halfway or past a set point of the race. A race is considered "official" if it has completed half the scheduled distance plus one additional lap. For instance, the Indianapolis 500 (200 laps) must complete 101 laps to be considered official.

In limited overs cricket, a game can only be considered complete if both teams have faced a certain number of legal deliveries (pitches); otherwise there is no result. In a 3-hour T20 cricket match, each team must face at least 30 deliveries, while in the 8-hour One Day International format, they must each receive at least 120 deliveries.

In boxing, a fight can be declared official for purposes of scoring in case of accidental head butts. That is typically the end of the second round, fourth round, or halfway. Fights that do not reach official status are no contest.
