= Effects of weather on sport =

Relationship between weather and sporting events

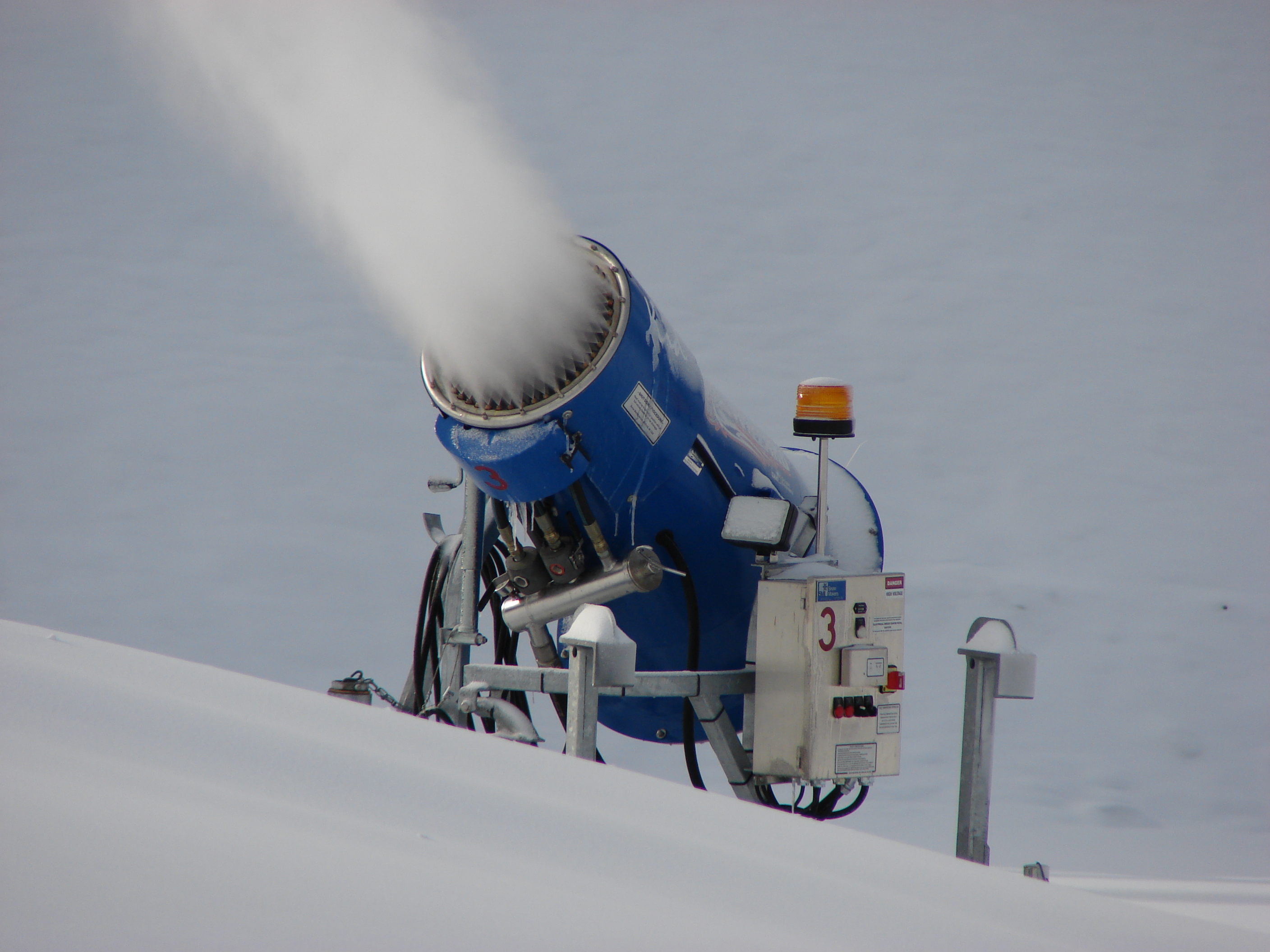
A snow cannon may be used when there is insufficient snow for winter sports

The effects of weather on sport are varied, with some events unable to take place while others are changed considerably. Temperature, precipitation, wind, and visibility are some of the weather conditions that have a great impact on sporting events and the performance of sporting personalities. Research conducted in sports science has shown that weather conditions have an impact on physical and mental capabilities. This article will discuss how weather conditions affect sports through the following aspects. The performance of participants can be reduced or improved, and some sporting world records are invalid if set under certain weather conditions. While outdoor sports are most affected, those played indoors can still be impacted by adverse or advantageous weather conditions.

== Temperature ==
Temperature has a significant impact on the performance of athletes and spectators. High temperature can cause various heat illnesses such as heat cramps and heatstroke, while very low temperatures may lead to hypothermia.

In cross country skiing world cup, races are cancelled or postponed if the temperature in a major portion of the course is -25°C or lower, while in biathlon the limit is -20°C. In bandy, the game time (which normally is 2×45 minutes) can be sliced up in more but shorter periods if the weather is very cold.

Training regimes may include methods of heat acclimatization, and regulations in some sports stipulate the intensity of some schedules. The National Collegiate Athletic Association (NCAA) in North America requires teams to build up the level of training in hot weather. Such preparation intends to improve performance and reduce the potentially fatal risk of heat stroke.

High temperatures also result in thinner air, which can lead to less drag on athletes in sports where air resistance plays a major role. Velodrome designers capitalise on this, heating the stadium in the hope of making the cycling faster, and The Daily Telegraph has reported that some Olympic Games organisers have pumped cold air into velodromes to give rival teams a disadvantage in close time trials.

In addition, If the weather is cold, there is also a possibility of frostbite and inhalation of cold and dry air, which may also affect the performance and health of athletes. So, in order to minimize the chances of getting a frostbite and inhale cold and dry air, the athletes should wear clothing that is designed specifically for cold conditions. These special clothings usually include thermal layers hat retains heat while also allowing the escape of moisture. Furthermore, it is important for an athlete to warm up adequately since the cold weather limits their flexibility. Additionally, an athlete may benefit from special training programs since those are effective in the cold weather as they help the body to adapt to the cold weather.

Another factor that is affected by the changes in the temperatures is the performance efficiency. It has been studied that there is an inverse relationship that exists between the temperatures and the performance efficiency of athletes. This is in the shape of a curve, referred to as the U-curve. The temperatures that are not too low or too high have a positive impact as it increases the maximum output that can be achieved physically by athletes. This increases their ability to improve their endurance and speed. It also improves their accuracy, productivity, and decision-making skills.

== Precipitation ==
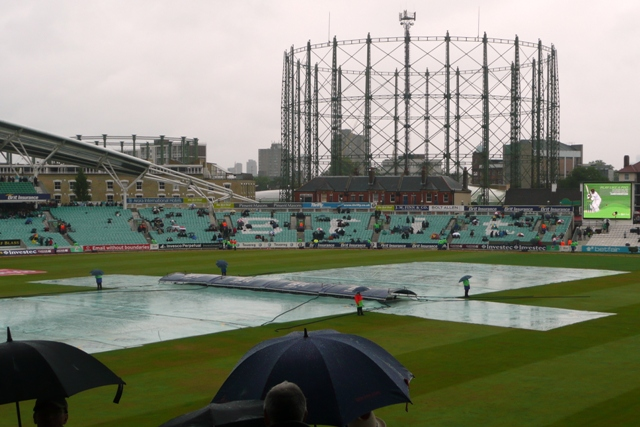
The Oval cricket ground during the rain, with covers protecting the main parts of the pitch

Some sports may also be canceled due to precipitation. For example, sports such as baseball, cricket, golf, and tennis may be canceled or delayed during a rainy period. Also, sports may be considered too dangerous to be played during a damp period due to the fear of slipping and injury. A game may also be canceled due to a waterlogged pitch in case of too much rainfall.

Some winter sports may also be canceled in case there is too much snow on the ground. This may be due to a lack of snow on the course or too much snow on the course. In bandy, the game time (which normally is 2×45 minutes) can be sliced up in more but shorter periods if snowfall requires the playing filed to be shoveled.

Research shows that precipitation may affect the physical performance of an athlete while playing a particular sport. Rainfall, snow, or a wet field may affect the athletes' speed, as well as their balancing and movement abilities. However, their technical performance remains the same, as they are in a position to control the energy output according to the pace.

Extreme weather conditions such as rain may have a game-changing impact on various strategies that teams use during matches. Weather conditions may lead some teams to be overly defensive in order to counter such weather conditions. Observations from athletes and players show that weather conditions may impact various games and alter some dynamics in a match.

== Wind ==
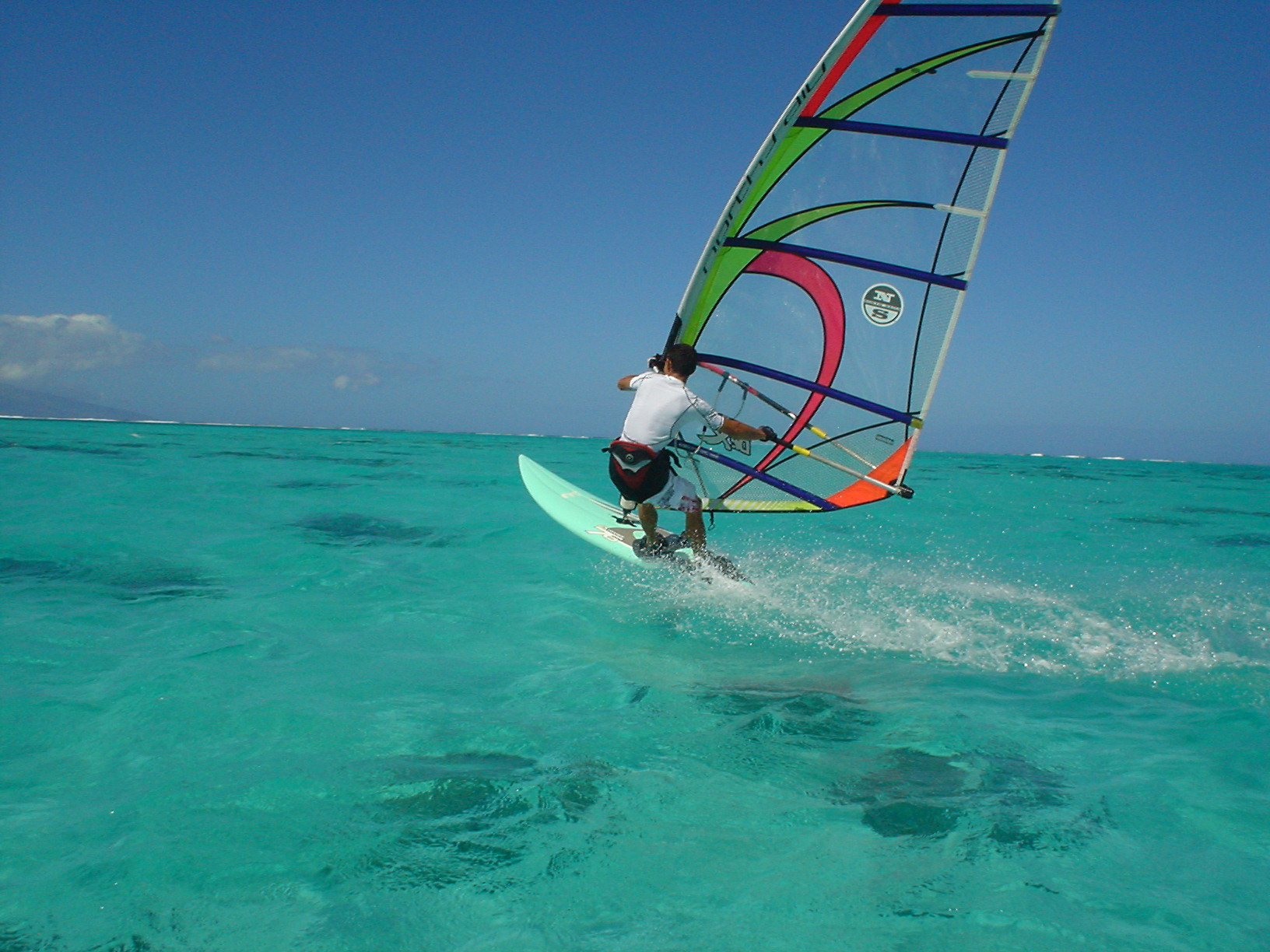
A windsurfer on calm water

Wind can blow the equipment in a sporting event, changing the direction or travel of a ball. In golf the wind levels may influence the way a shot is taken.

A headwind can slow runners, while they may gain wind assistance from a tailwind.

Some sports rely on the presence of wind, especially surface water sports.

Data analysis show that the effects of wind are significant when it comes to sprinting and jumping. When the speed of the wind is about 2.0 m/s, the athletes are able to benefit from the tailwind, which allows them to increase their speed in the sprint as well as the jump's distance. However, the effects depend on the level of the athletes. Amateurs benefit more compared to professionals. The effects of the wind are non-linear, meaning that the changes in the conditions of the wind are not reflected equally, resulting in different outcomes.

== Visibility ==
Some sports cannot be played if there is insufficient visibility as it can make them dangerous or can be disadvantageous to a competitor. Cricket test matches often finish when the umpire decides that the light level is too low and the timing of this can sometimes be controversial. The difficulties of playing in bad light conditions is also disputed. Some events are called off when there is heavy fog.

The position of the sun can be a disadvantage to some competitors. In some circumstances a player may have their vision impaired by the brightness of the sun.

The glare of the sun also affects the visual performances of athletes, as it may hinder their ability to see objects clearly. However, the athletes have the option of wearing special glasses that may help them see objects clearly during a competition, despite the glare of the sun.

== See also ==
- Altitude training and the effects of high altitude on humans
- High altitude football controversy
- Magnus effect
