= HappySad Records =

- Founded: 1971
- Founder: Paul Levinson, Ed Fox
- Genre: Rock
- Country of origin: U.S.
- Location: New York City

HappySad Records was an independent record label founded in 1971 by Paul Levinson and Ed Fox, taken over by Levinson in 1972.

Its major release, Twice Upon a Rhyme, was rediscovered and described thirty years later, in July 2002, in Japan's Record Collectors Magazine as "human mystical pop music". HappySad Records has repeatedly been listed in Hans Pokora's series of books titled 2001 Record Collectors Dreams and subsequent editions, and reviewed in Fuzz Acid and Flowers, a Comprehensive Guide to American Garage, Psychedelic and Hippie Rock (1964–1975) by music historian Vernon Joynson.

In 2008 a South Korean company, Big Pink/BeatBall, re-released the HappySad record as a CD, which was followed by a Japanese edition released by Vivid Records. In 2010 and 2012 a re-mastered edition was released in a limited edition in England by Whiplash Records.

== Releases ==
- "Merry Goes 'Round" b/w "Raincheck": a single (vinyl) by Trousers, 1971
- "Raincheck" b/w "Looks Like a Night (I Won 't Catch Much Sleep In)" follow-up single (vinyl) by Trousers, 1971
- "Twice Upon a Rhyme": an LP album (vinyl) by Paul Levinson with Ed Fox and Peter Rosenthal, 1972

== See also ==
- List of record labels
