= Suzhou High School of Jiangsu Province =

Coordinates: 31.298641°N 120.618875°E

- 江苏省苏州中学
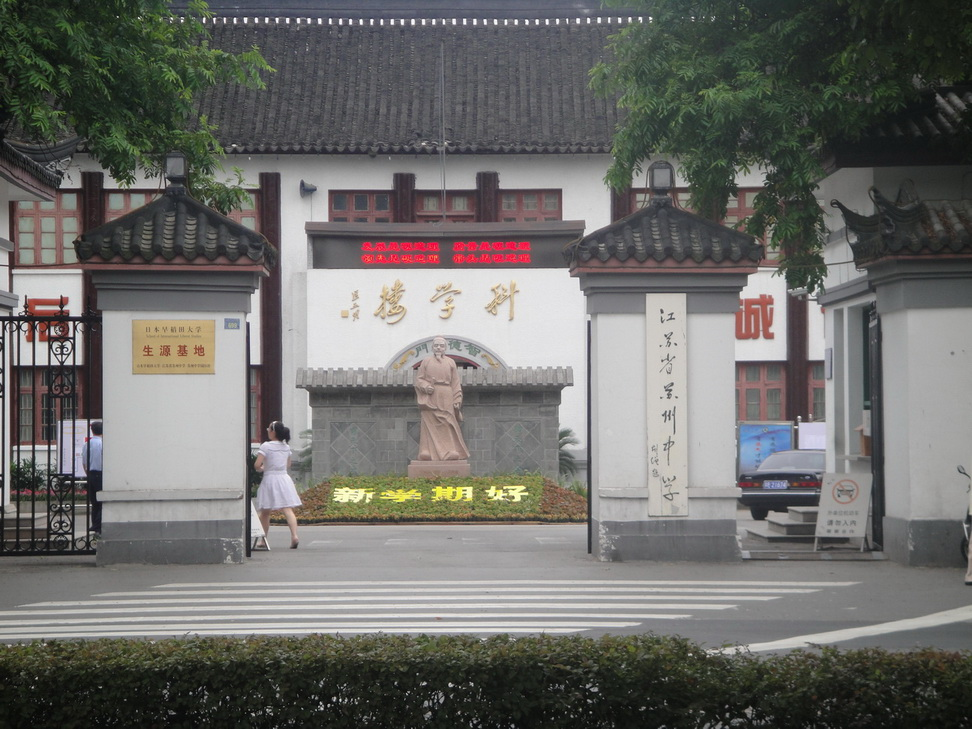

- 699 Renmin Road, Suzhou, Jiangsu 215007; China

Information
- Motto: Honesty, Faith, Thoughtfulness, Courage (诚、信、思、勇)
- Established: 1035; 991 years ago
- Principal: Wei Xin (卫新)
- Staff: 348
- Faculty: 251
- Enrollment: 2014
- Website: szzx1000.cn

The Suzhou High School of Jiangsu Province (江苏省苏州中学) is a public high school in Suzhou, Jiangsu, China.

In 1035, the Northern Song politician and writer Fan Zhongyan founded the earliest predecessor of the current Suzhou High School, Suzhou Prefecture School (苏州府学). During the Qing dynasty, Zhang Boxing (張伯行) established the Ziyang College (紫陽書院) inside the Suzhou Prefecture School. It was one of the most prestigious colleges in the nation, and several emperors of the Qing dynasty praised its achievements. In the 1900s, the imperial examination was abandoned, and consequently Duanfang, the governor of Jiangsu, transformed the school into a modern school. He also invited sinology masters Wang Guowei and Luo Zhenyu to join the faculty of the school. In addition, during the Republic of China period, Zhang Taiyan and Qian Mu taught sinology here. It is widely regarded as one of the four most famous high schools in Jiangnan. (Note: The others are Shanghai High School, Yangzhou High School and Hangzhou High School.)

After the establishment of People's Republic of China, Suzhou High School became one of the 24 key high schools of China in 1953, which were selected by the Ministry of Education, and one of the top four high schools in Jiangsu Province. (Note: The others are High School Affiliated to Nanjing Normal University, Changzhou High School and Yangzhou High School.) In 1997, Suzhou High School was one of the first batch of national model high schools in Jiangsu Province. After the key school concept was abolished, it became a four-starred high school in 2004. In a 2016 ranking of Chinese high schools that send students to study in American universities, Suzhou High School ranked number 39 in mainland China in terms of the number of students entering top American universities.

== History ==
=== Suzhou Prefecture School ===
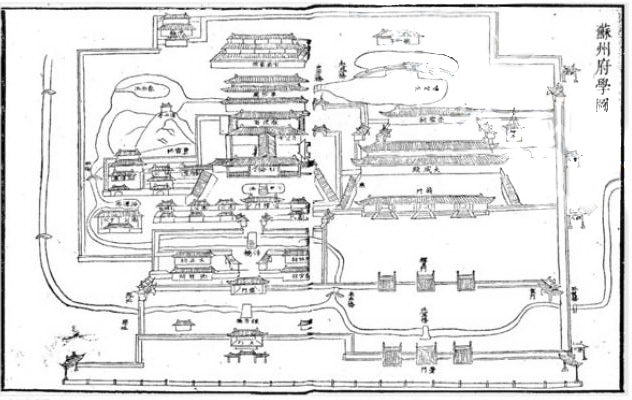
A map of Suzhou Prefecture School in 1790

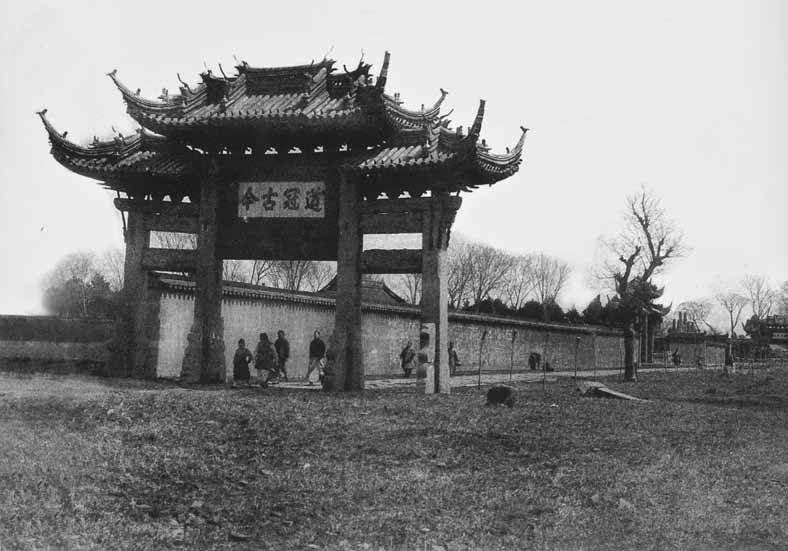
The gate of Suzhou Prefecture School

In 1035, Fan Zhongyan, the prime minister of the Northern Song dynasty founded the Suzhou Prefecture School, which is the first time in Chinese history that combined prefecture school with Confucian temple. The same year, Fan Zhongyan donated a house, and began the construction of quasi-government school after the approval of the Emperor Ren Zong. Then he employed the educator Hu Yuan, the implementor of "sub-Studio" teaching style. Since then, with the school in Suzhou, Suzhou High School began the "Millennium Prefecture School" (千年府学) of history.

=== Ziyang College ===
During the Qing dynasty, Zhang Boxing (张伯行) established the Ziyang College (紫阳书院) in the Suzhou Prefecture School. At that time, most of the governmental schools are civil examination-oriented while the Ziyang College focused on Neo-Confucianism. Zhang also engaged famous teachers from all over the country and the college attracted students nationwide. In 1860, Suzhou Prefecture School was seriously damaged in the catastrophe of Taiping Rebellion. Fourteen years later, governor Zhang Shusheng (张树声) arranged a huge budget in its reconstruction.

=== During the late Qing dynasty and ROC ===
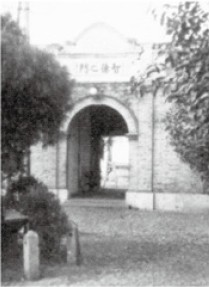
Gate of Wisdom and Virtue (智德之门)

In 1902, Ziyang College was renamed to Xiaoshiguan (校士馆, literally meaning a place for school scholars). Two years later, Duanfang, the provincial governor of Jiangsu, established Jiangsu Normal School (江苏师范学堂) on its campus. He invited sinology great masters Luo Zhenyu and Wang Guowei to the school, serving as principal and teacher respectively. After that, the renowned elite college in Jiangnan became a public high school.

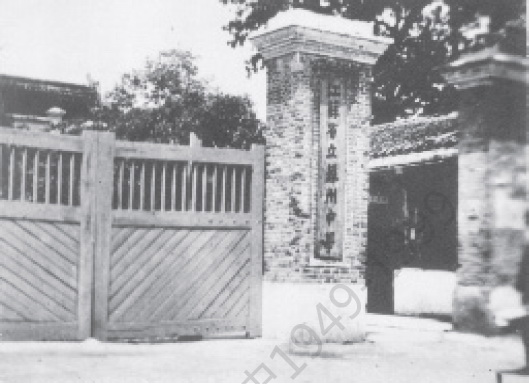
Jiangsu Provincial Suzhou High School

In 1911, the school was renamed to Jiangsu Provincial No.1 Normal School (江苏省立第一师范学校). During May Fourth Movement, students in the school established a student council with some universities to protest the signing of the Treaty of Versailles. In mid-May, the students' strike finally affected the government's decision. In 1927, Wang Maozu, an educationist who studied at Harvard University and Columbia University and former principal of Beijing Normal University, became the principal of Jiangsu Provincial Suzhou High School. After that, he modified the English name of this school to Soochow Academy. He invited some famous scholars, including Qian Mu, Zhang Taiyan and Lü Shuxiang.

After Wang resigned in 1931, Jiangsu Province Department of Education let geographer Hu Huanyong at National Central University to take this position temporarily. In July 1932, SHS started to admit girls, which is considered as a progress in China at that time. In the 1st Jiangsu Provincial High School Graduate Examination held in 1933, SHS students attracted nationwide attention by having 24 of them ranked in Top 100 in the province. Two years later, Hu Huanyong returned to National Central University after the negotiation of university and the Department of Education.

On November 19, 1937, the Japanese Army invaded Suzhou and occupied the campus of Suzhou High School. During the 8-year war, the school relocated seven times and changed its name twice, in order to minimize attention. After the fall of Suzhou, SHS initially moved to rural Yixing—the Suzhou High School at Boyang (亳阳苏中). The students and faculty members had to change their campus again when Japanese occupied the whole Sunan (Southern Jiangsu) region. The Suzhou High School at Shanghai (苏中沪校) was located at Fuzhou Road, Shanghai International Settlement. On December 8, 1941, the U.S. declared war upon Japan and the Japanese Army eventually annexed the International Settlement. As a result, SHS moved to Changzhou ("Private Qingyun School", 私立青云), Yixing ("Private Hongyi School", 私立弘毅), though in the name of private schools. In October 1945, Suzhou High School finally returned to its original campus after the surrender of Japan. During the 1940s and 1950s, Suzhou High School continued to be one of China's top high schools, with 40-50 students admitted by Peking University, Tsinghua University and Jiaotong University each year. Despite this, the high-level academic atmosphere comparable with top universities no longer existed. During the Chinese Communist Revolution, the People's Liberation Army occupied Suzhou on April 27, 1949, and the Communist Party took over the school.

== Today ==
In 1978, the school was named as a high school in Suzhou, Jiangsu Province, and became the first school to restore one of the key secondary schools.

In 1985, the school and the University of Science and Technology co-founded the Junior Class College preparatory classes.

It established friendly relations and cooperation with schools in Japan, Singapore, United Kingdom, the United States, Canada, Australia, New Zealand and other countries more than 10 universities (such as the Massachusetts Institute of Technology, Waseda University, Japan). In 2007, Suzhou High School introduced the Cambridge International High School program.

Founded in 1996, the Suzhou Lida Middle School was transformed in 2005 into the state-controlled joint-venture Suzhou Lida school. The Suzhou High School Park affiliate was founded in 2003 and located in Suzhou Industrial Park.

In 2004, the school was classified as a four-star high school in Jiangsu Province. For three consecutive years since 1999, the CPC Jiangsu Provincial Committee and Jiangsu Provincial People's Government awarded the "Civilized Unit of Jiangsu Province pacesetter" honor.

In 2025 the school is an International Baccalaureate school with over 2,000 students.

== Teachers ==
Suzhou High School has five professors for senior secondary school teachers and 19 grade teachers in-service provincial team.

== Campus ==
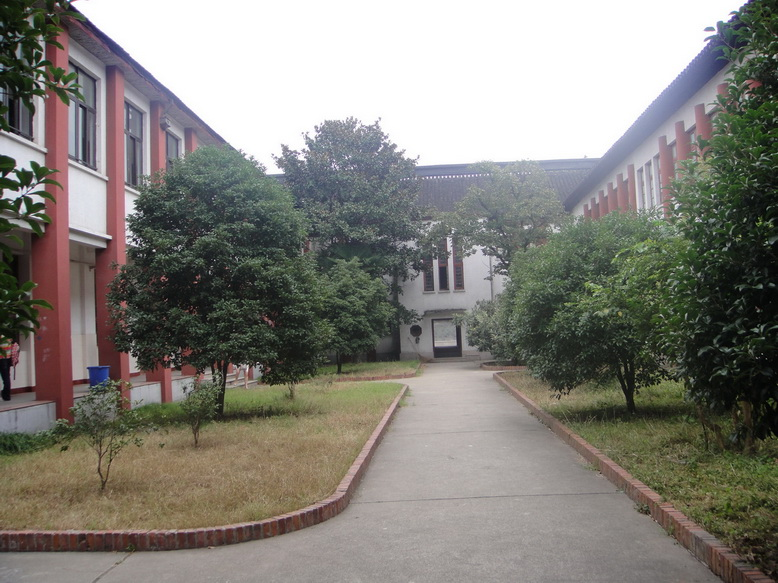
Science Building

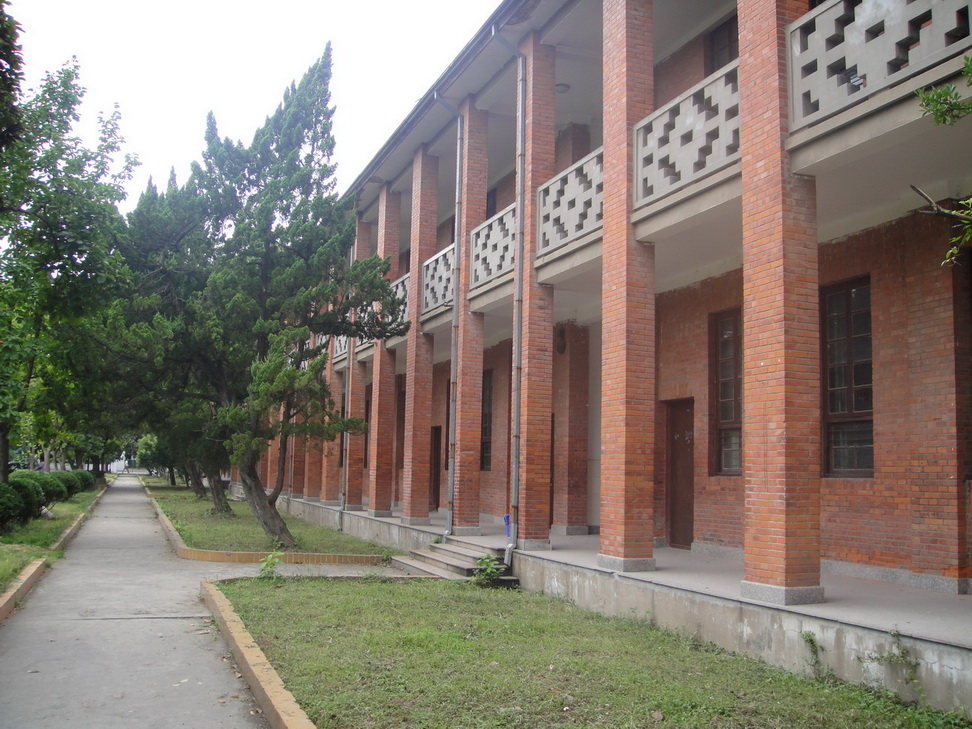
West Red Building

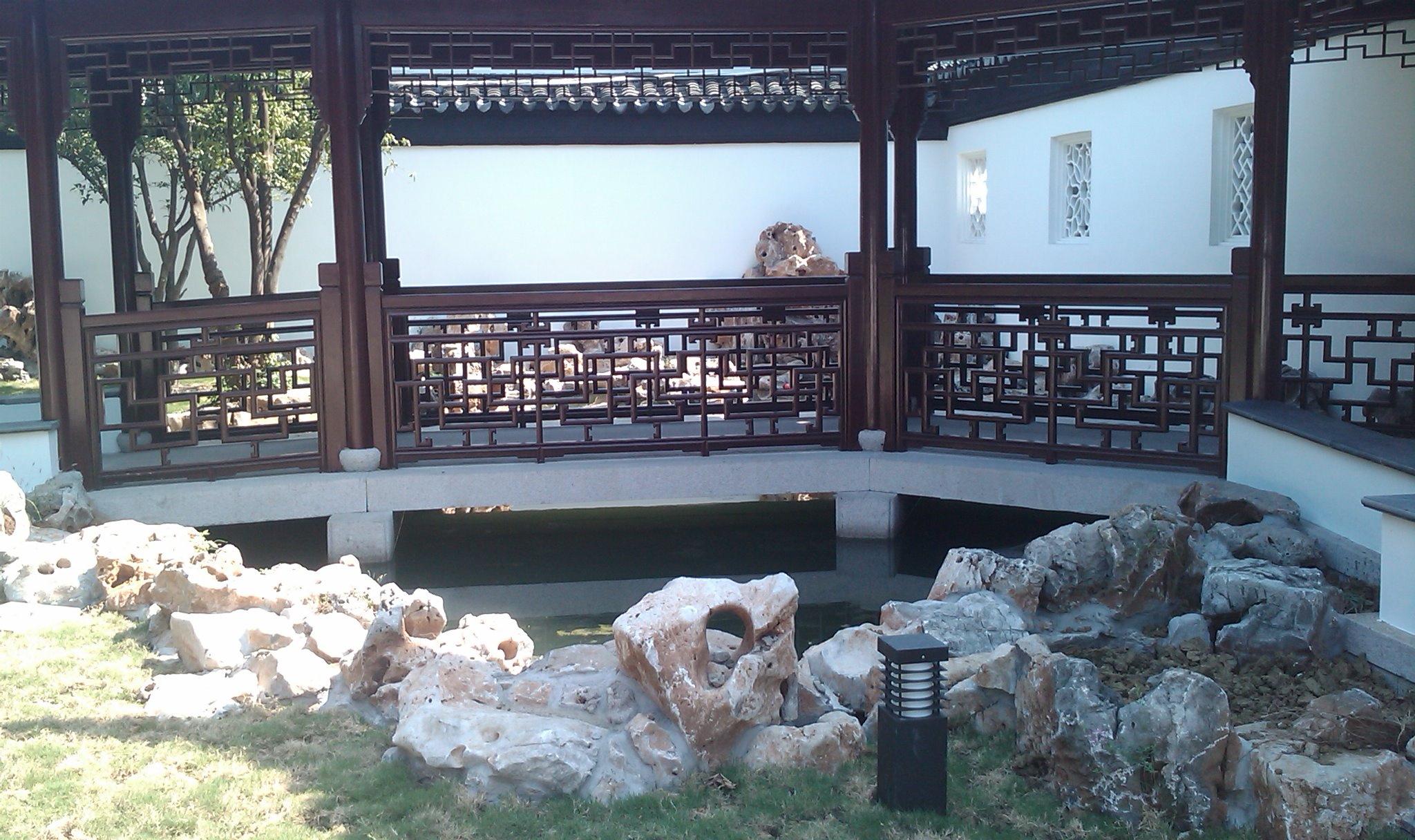
Classical garden style

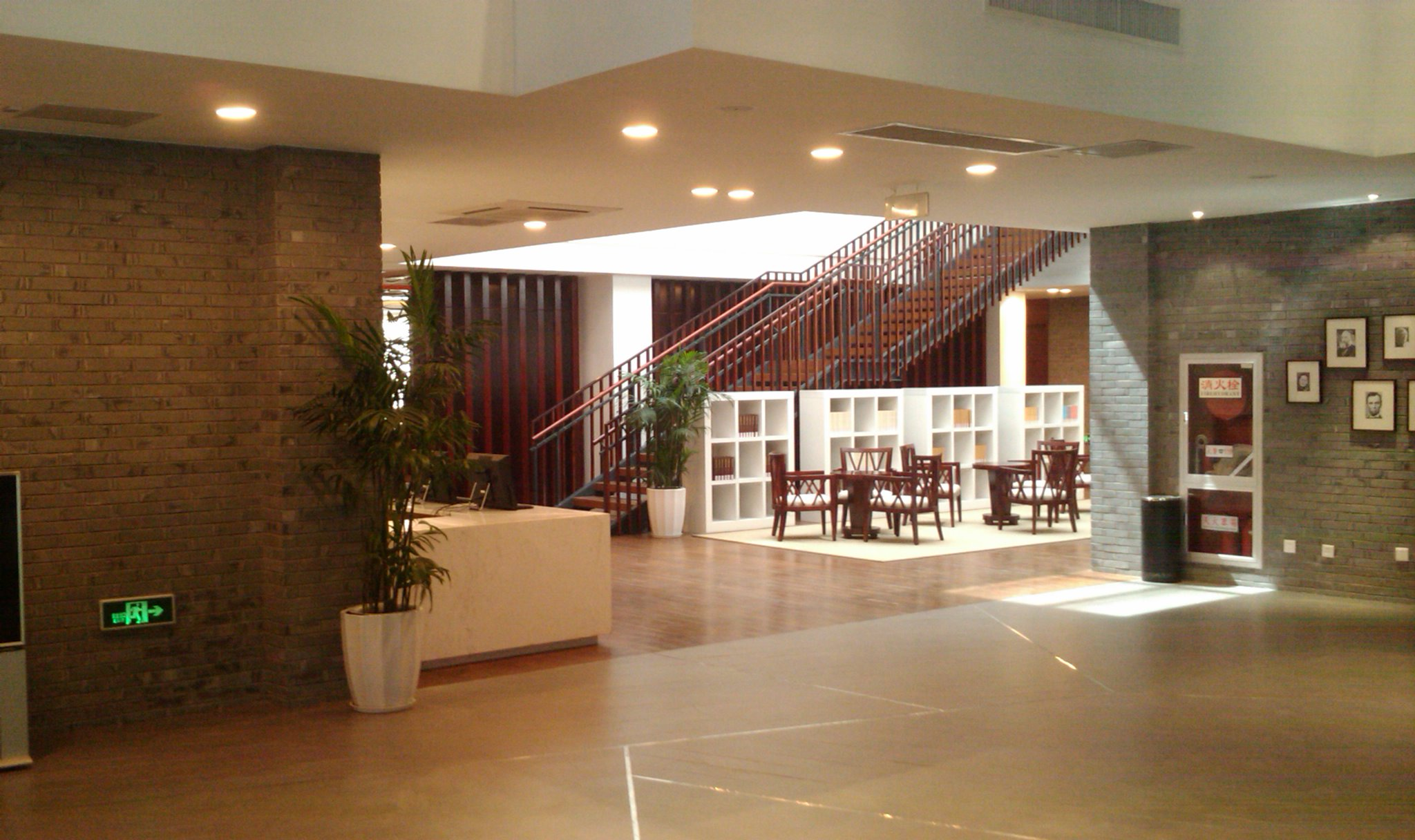
Library

It is located on Sanyuan Fang (三元坊) of Renmin Road in Suzhou. Its ground occupy an area of 160 mu(1 mu = 666.67 square meters).

The teaching areas of Suzhou High School surrounds the Daoshan Hill (道山). The symbol of Suzhou High School is the Science Building facing the main gate near Renmin Road. The main teaching buildings are the East and West red buildings (西红楼, 东红楼) as well as East and West white buildings (西白楼, 东白楼). Library, the Laboratory Building, the Info-tech Building and the stadium was built in the 1990s.

== Notable alumni ==
=== Scientists ===
- Tsung-Dao Lee^{NAS} ^{CAS}, theoretical physicist and Nobel Prize laureate
- Chien-Shiung Wu^{NAS} ^{CAS}, experimental physicist and Wolf Prize laureate
- Chien Wei-zang^{CAS}, physicist
- Hu Ning^{CAS}, theoretical physicist
- Feng Duan^{CAS}, physicist
- Feng Kang^{CAS}, mathematician
- Yao Zhen^{CAS}, biologist
- Xiaowei Zhuang^{NAS}, biophysicist
- Tianxi Cai, biostatistician

=== Engineers ===
- Yuan-Cheng Fung^{NAS} ^{NAE}, bioengineer
- Shi Jun, chemical engineer
- Chia-Shun Yih^{NAE}, fluid mechanics engineer
- Ju-Chin Chu, chemical engineer and father of Steven Chu

=== Politicians ===
- Qin Bangxian, early leader of the CPC.
- Zhou Yongkang, party and state leader.
- Yuan Weimin, made contributions to Chinese sport.

=== Writers ===
- Wu Zuoren
- Lu Wenfu

=== Entrepreneurs ===
- President Yu Liang, of China Vanke Co.

=== Principals ===
Principal	Period	Principal	Period
Luo Zhenyu	1904.7—1906.3	Zhang Shizhi	1950—1952
Wang Rundong	1906.3—1906.8	Chen Liuzhong	1952—1958
Lu Maoxun	1906.8—1907.4	Zhang Yuanding	1958.4—1958.8
Zhang Yu	1907.4—1907.11	Liu Chaochen	1958—1959
Zou Fubao	1907.11—1909.6	Chen Liuzhong	1959—1960
Yao Wendong	1909.6—1910.1	Zhang Youju	1960—1964
Jiang Heng	1910.1—1911.10	Liu Yihan	1964—1968
Yang Yueru	1912.1—1916.2	Su Haiming	1968—1971
Jiang Fengwu	1916.2—1916.8	Chi Dexin	1971—1978
Wang Chaoyang	1916.8—1927.6	Zhao Zhenhai	1978—1984
Wang Maozu	1927—1931	Liu Baitao	1984—1991
Hu Huanyong	1931—1933	Shen Yangshi	1991—1995
Wu Yuandi	1933—1935	Wang Shaodong	1995—1997
Shao Heting	1935—1938	Ni Zhenmin	1997—2007
Hang Haicha	1938—1947	Zhang Xin	2007—2015
Zheng Baozi	1947—1948	Zhou Chunliang	2015—2016
Gu Zhonghua	1948—1950	Wei Xin	2016—

== Bibliographies ==
- 金德门 (1999), 苏州中学校史（1035-1949） (in Chinese) (1st ed.), Suzhou: Suzhou University Press, ISBN 9787810376068
- 蔡大镛 (2007), 苏州中学校史（1949-1999） (in Chinese) (1st ed.), Suzhou: Suzhou University Press
- 蔡大镛、张昕 (2009), 道山情怀——苏州中学的千年传奇故事 (in Chinese), Suzhou: Guwuxuan Press, ISBN 9787807334774
- 杨镜如 (2006), 紫阳书院志（1713-1904） (in Chinese) (1st ed.), Suzhou: Suzhou University Press, ISBN 7810904388
- 苏州中学校本系列教材编写委员会 (2007), 中国名校优良传统丛书·江苏省苏州中学卷 (in Chinese), Beijing: China Encyclopedia Press
- Tze-Ki Hon (2005), The Yijing and Chinese politics: classical commentary and literati activism in the northern Song Period, 960-1127, SUNY Press, ISBN 9780791463116
