= Li Xudan =

Chinese geographer (1911–1985)

Li Xudan 李旭旦
- Born: October 29, 1911; Jiangyin, Jiangsu, Qing China
- Died: July 8, 1985 (aged 73); Nanjing, Jiangsu, China
- Education: National Central University; Cambridge University
- Scientific career
- Fields: Human geography
- Workplaces: National Central University; Nanjing University; Nanjing Normal University

Li Xudan

Li Xudan (Chinese: 李旭旦, 1911 - 1985) was a Chinese human geographer born in Jiangyin, Jiangsu Province.

== Life and career ==
Li graduated from Nanjing Middle School(南菁中学). In 1930, he was accepted into the National Central University Department of Geography. He graduated in the summer of 1934, afterwards, staying at the school as a teaching assistant. In September 1936, Li was admitted to Cambridge University, where he majored in regional geography, and completed a Master of Science in geography. After graduating, he traveled to Germany, France, Switzerland, the Netherlands, and even climbed the Alps. Afterwards, he crossed the Atlantic and arrived in the United States. Finally, he crossed the Pacific and arrived in Shanghai. In 1939, he returned to his Alma mater to teach and also to serve as the chief editor of the Journal of Geography.

As the Second Sino-Japanese War raged across China, Li fled to Shapingba, Chongqing with his school, where he taught English, Geography, and the history of Geography. In 1941, he travelled to the Northwest of China to inspect the middle reaches of the Bailong River. There, he proposed that the Bailong River be one of the north-south boundaries of China. In doing so, the proposal further addressed the westward extension of the Qinling Huaihe Line as the dividing line between the eastern agricultural area and the western pastoral area of China.

In 1943, Li became a director of the Central University Geography Department. In 1946, he was invited as a visiting professor to the University of Maryland. That following year, he published "Division of Geographical Areas in China" (中国地理区之划分). He then returned to China, and worked in the Central University.

In January 1949, the People's Liberation Army captured Nanjing. On August 8, the Central University was renamed to Nanjing University. Li worked in the Department of Geography, and he published Economic Geography of Soviet Union (苏联经济地理). In 1950, he founded the journal Geography Knowledge with Shi Yafeng and Chuanjun Wu. In 1952, Nanjing Normal University was established on the basis of Nanjing University and Jinling University. Li later resigned his position in Nanjing University and served as the chief in the newly established Nanjing Normal University Geography Department. In 1957, he was regarded as a rightist during the Anti-Rightist Campaign of the Chinese Communist Party, but he still continued his research despite the purging of rightists. In 1979, he was rehabilitated and selected as a standing director for The Geographical Society of China.

During the 1980s, Li contracted an illness, but was able to complete three of his final books. On July 8, 1985, Li died of illness in Nanjing at the age of 74.

== Books ==
Li Xudan translated Jean Brunhes's Principle of Human Geology into Chinese with Ren Meie in his college life. In addition, he translated Preston E. James 's All Possible Worlds: A History of Geographical Ideas much later in his life. In the 1940s, he published an article Human Geography Observation in the Middle Reaches of Bailong River(白龙江中游人生地理观察) to express the importance of rational usage of natural resources. Li's article also addressed the importance of coordination of human-land relationships. The Division of Geographical Areas in China published in 1947 put forward a theory to divide geographical areas under comprehensive factors. He emphasised the unity of geography, opposing the separation of physical geography and human geography.
