= Heihe–Tengchong Line =

Imaginary boundary line dividing China

Heihe–Tengchong Line dividing Mainland China into eastern (area in red) and western (area in yellow) halves

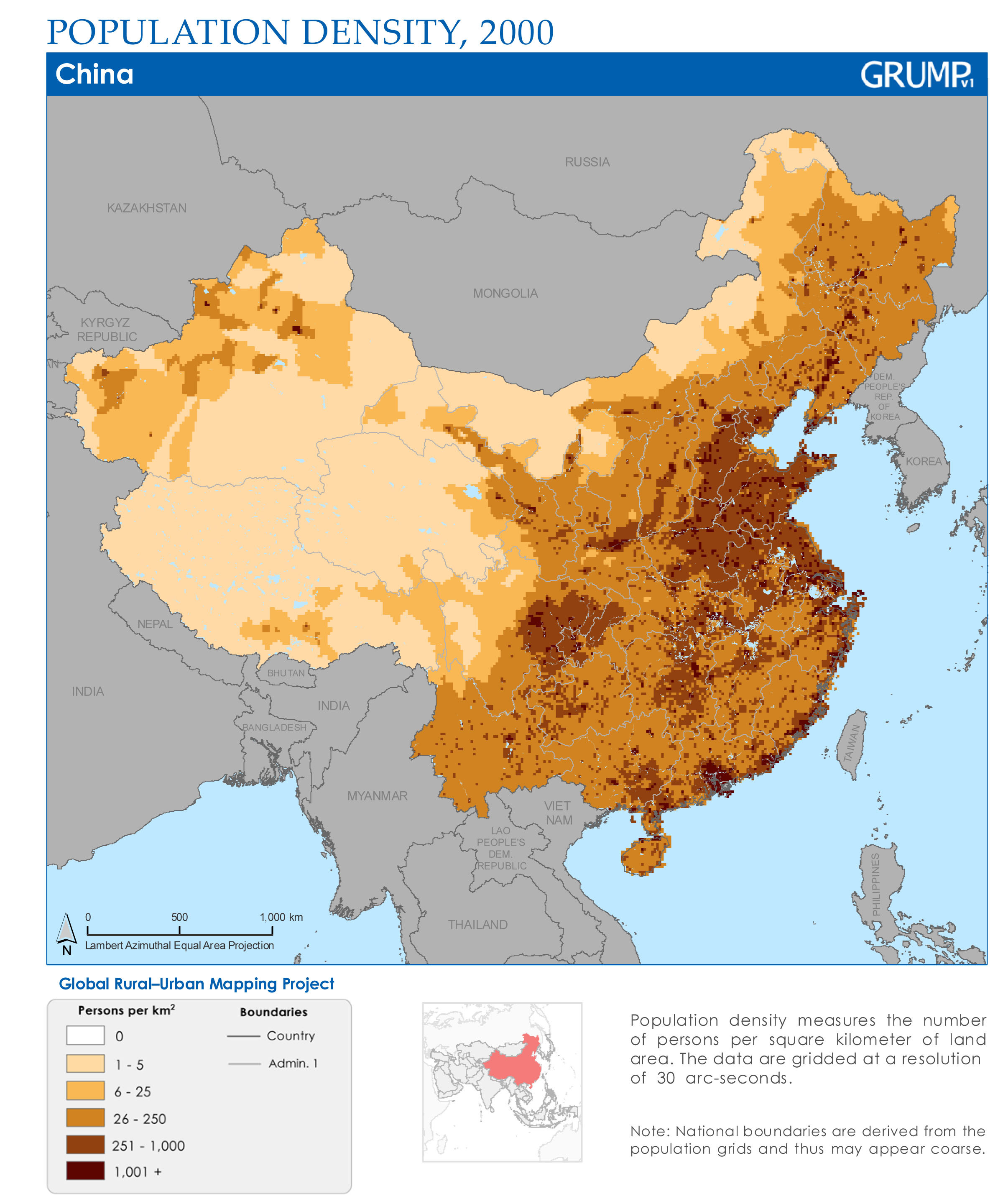
Population density in 2000

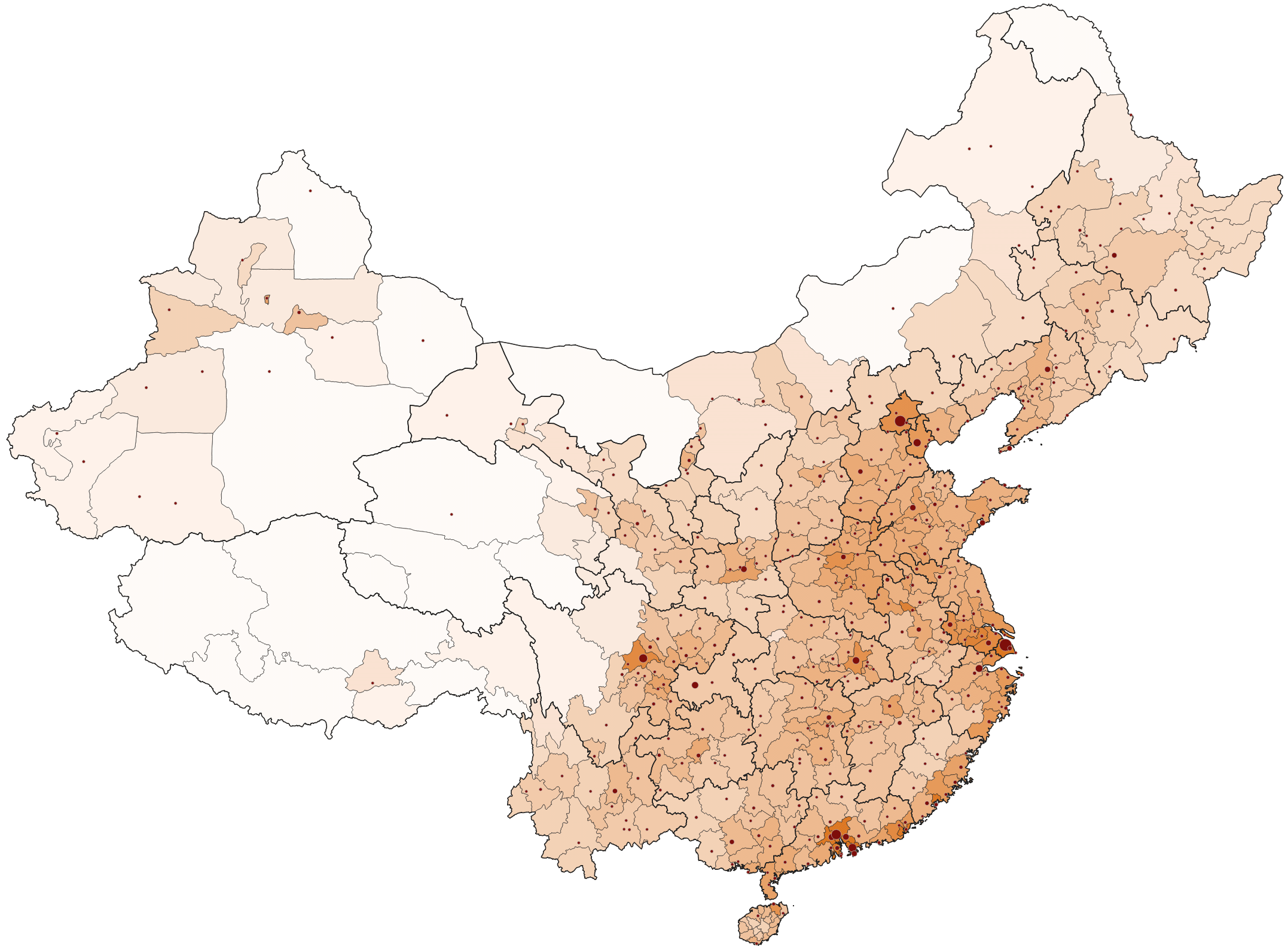
Population density on prefecture level, based on the official 2022 census

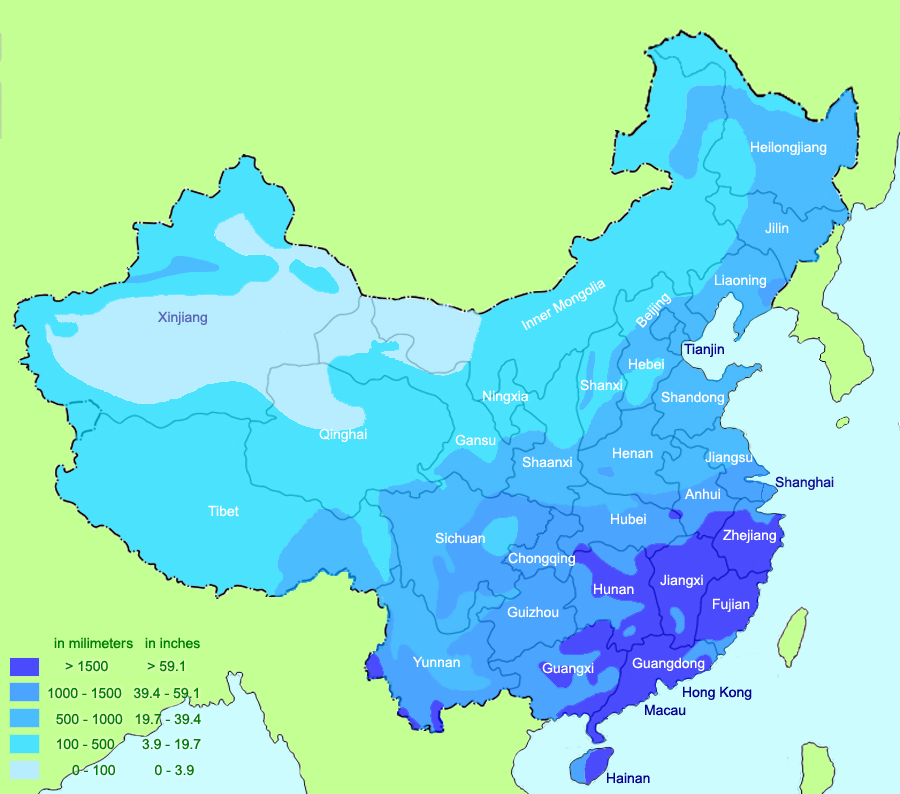
The average annual precipitation in Mainland China

The Heihe–Tengchong Line (simplified Chinese: 黑河–腾冲线; traditional Chinese: 黑河–騰衝線; pinyin: Hēihé–Téngchōng xiàn), also called the Aihui–Tengchong Line and internationally as the Hu Huanyong line or Hu line, is an imaginary line coined by Chinese demographer Hu Huanyong (1901–1998) that divides China into two portions with contrasting population densities and climates. It stretches diagonally across China from the prefectural city of Heihe, Heilongjiang province in the northeast to Tengchong, Yunnan province in the southwest. The eastern portion (area shown in red on the map) is further subdivided into northern and southern halves by the Qinling–Huaihe Line.

As of 2015, the eastern portion constitutes 43% of the total territory but has 94% of the country's population; while the western portion constitutes 57% of the total territory but has only 6% of the country's population. The line also approximates partly with the 400 mm (16 in) annual total rainfall isohyetal line proposed by historian Ray Huang, which demarcates the humid continental/humid subtropical climate zones suitable for large-scale agriculture from semi-arid regions that can only consistently support pastoralism.

== History ==
Chinese population geographer Hu Huanyong imagined the line in 1935 and called it a "geo-demographic demarcation line". As this line was proposed in 1935, the map of China at the time included Mongolia (whose independence China did not recognise until after WWII) but excluded Taiwan (which was a colony of Japan at the time).

The origin of the contrast in population density can be found in the favourable climate for agriculture, fertile land and coastal access in eastern China. The oldest cities in China were located in the southeastern and northeastern regions, such as the Zhongyuan (Central Plains) due to proximity to rivers. The presence of drainage basins formed by the Yangtze and Yellow River improve crop yield, allowing for population increases. Additionally, access to the coast enables overseas trade and allows for economic growth.

The most densely populated region, and historical heartland of China is described in the West by the term China proper due to the dominance of Chinese culture and the Han Chinese ethnicity throughout the dynasties in contrast with the outer regions.

== Demographic trend ==
=== 1935 statistics ===
This imaginary line divides the territory of China as follows (going by 1935 statistics):

- West of the line (including Mongolia Area): 64% of the area, but only 4% of the population (1935)
- East of the line: 36% of the area, but 96% of the population (1935)

=== 2002 and 2015 statistics ===
Despite a large scale urban migration mainly towards coasts but also trending south, 2002 and 2015 statistics remain nearly identical vis-à-vis the line:

- West of the line: 57% of the area, but only 6% of the population (2002)
- East of the line: 43% of the area, but 94% of the population (2002)

The major change in area between 1935 and 2015 is attributed to China acknowledging the independence of Mongolia after the Yalta Conference. The minor change in total population percent from 1935 to 2015 is attributed to Han Chinese migration to urban areas west of the line, as well as one-child policy restrictions on the majority, with exceptions for largely-minority groups west of the line. However, during the 2000–2015 period, population in the west of the line indeed grew faster than the east, but the growth was not sufficient to budge the rounded percentages. Most of this growth was contained in the cities of Ürümqi, Lanzhou, Ordos, and Yinchuan, although some tribal non-city areas also registered high growth.

== See also ==
- Qinling–Huaihe Line, further subdivides eastern China in northern and southern halves
- Physiographic macroregions of China
- China proper
- 100th Meridian West, similar dividing line in the United States
- Administrative divisions of China
- Autonomous administrative divisions of China
- Autonomous regions of China
