= Feng Kang =

Chinese mathematician (1920–1993)

Feng Kang (simplified Chinese: 冯康; traditional Chinese: 馮康; pinyin: Féng Kāng; September 9, 1920 – August 17, 1993) was a Chinese mathematician. He was elected an academician of the Chinese Academy of Sciences in 1980. After his death, the Chinese Academy of Sciences established the Feng Kang Prize in 1994 to reward young Chinese researchers who made outstanding contributions to computational mathematics.

== Early life and education ==
Feng was born in Nanjing, China and spent his childhood in Suzhou, Jiangsu. He studied at Suzhou High School. In 1939 he was admitted to Department of Electrical Engineering of the National Central University (Nanjing University). Two years later he transferred to the Department of Physics where he studied until his graduation in 1944. He became interested in mathematics and studied it at the university.

== Career ==
After graduation, he contracted spinal tuberculosis and continued to learn mathematics by himself at home. Later in 1946 he went to teach mathematics at Tsinghua University. In 1951 he was appointed as assistant professor at Institute of Mathematics of the Chinese Academy of Sciences. From 1951 to 1953 he worked at Steklov Mathematical Institute in Moscow, under the supervision of Professor Lev Pontryagin. In 1957 he was elected as an associate professor at Institute of Computer Technology of the Chinese Academy of Sciences, where he began his work on computational mathematics and became the founder and leader of computational mathematics and scientific computing in China. In 1978 he was appointed as the first Director of the newly founded Computing Center of the Chinese Academy of Sciences until 1987 when he became the Honorary Director.

== Contributions ==
Feng contributed to several fields in mathematics. Before 1957 he mainly worked on pure mathematics, specially on topological groups, Lie groups and generalized function theory. From 1957 he began studying applied mathematics and computational mathematics. He made a series of discoveries in computational mathematics.

In the later 1950s and early 1960s, based on the computations of dam constructions, Feng proposed a systematic numerical technique for solving partial differential equations. The method was called the Finite difference method based on variation principles (基于变分原理的差分方法). This method was also independently invented in the West, and is more widely known as the finite element method. It is now considered that the invention of the finite element method is a milestone of computational mathematics.

In the 1970s Feng developed embedding theories in discontinuous finite element space, and generalized classical theory on elliptic partial differential equations to various dimensional combinations, which provided a mathematical foundation for elastic composite structures. He also worked on reducing elliptic PDEs to boundary integral equations, which led to the development of the natural boundary element method, now regarded as one of three main boundary element methods. Since 1978 he had given lectures and seminars on finite elements and natural boundary elements in more than ten universities and institutes in France, Italy, Japan and United States.

From 1984 Feng changed his research field from elliptic PDEs to dynamical systems such as Hamiltonian systems and wave equations. He proposed symplectic algorithms for Hamiltonian systems. Such algorithms preserve the symplectic geometric structure of Hamiltonian systems. He led a research group which worked on symplectic algorithms for solving Hamiltonian systems with finite and infinite dimensions, and also on dynamical systems with Lie algebraic structures, such as contact systems and source-free systems. Since these algorithms make use of the corresponding geometry and the underlying Lie algebras and Lie groups, they are superior to conventional algorithms in long term tracking and qualitative simulation in many practical applications, such as celestial mechanics and molecular dynamics.
