= High School Affiliated to Nanjing Normal University Jiangning Campus =

Coordinates: 31.8941°N 118.8204°E

The High School Affiliated to Nanjing Normal University Jiangning Campus
- No 1999, Jiyin Avenue, Jiangning District, Nanjing, Jiangsu, China

Information
- Type: Private Boarding School
- Established: 2003
- Principal: Hai-Yein Lee
- Campus: Country
- Website: www.nsfz.cn

The High School Affiliated to Nanjing Normal University Jiangning Campus (NSFJ-CN, Simplified Chinese: 南京师范大学附属中学江宁分校, nickname Fu-Zhong-Fen-Xiao 附中分校) is a high school located in Jiangning, Nanjing, China. It was founded in 2003, as the Jiangning Branch of the High School Affiliated to Nanjing Normal University. The Jiangning Campus totally contains more than 6000 students from different places in Asia. Jiangning Campus also runs real property business, it is the owner of an estate called Long Hu, Wenxinyuan.

== Campus History ==
Founded on October 5, 2002, The High School Affiliated to Nanjing Normal University Jiangning Campus is the Jiangning Branch of the Famous High School, the High School Affiliated to Nanjing Normal University. While the Campus has only constructed its 20% of the building, it began its enrolment in July 2003. At that time, most of the staff are experienced staff from the city campus, students with high academic result from other cities who failed to enter the city campus, has been introduced to enroll in the Jiangning Campus rather than go back to their hometown, thus, For the first year of its teaching activities began, the Jiangning Campus achieve amazing result among private high schools around Nanjing. In the 2006 College Entrance Examination, 3 of the graduates enter Tsing-Hua University, the best University in China, while the percentage of the student who entered universities rated the 4th in the whole administrative area of Nanjing.

However, after its first successful result, most of the experienced staff from the city campus have been replaced with the staff from northern Jiangsu Province and new graduates from universities around Nanjing. With improper administration, the academic result have been reducing every year, in 2007 only 33% of the graduates enter universities, in 2008 the result is even low, less than 30%, while in 2009 the result become better than the past two years, as in 2006 the campus have loaded students with better background by its high achievement on College Entrance Examination, while compare to other high schools in Nanjing, such result is still inferior.

As unpleasant academic achievement in domestic College Entrance Examination, in late 2007, the new principal, Hai-Yein Lee, planned IELTS and TOEFL course within the campus, as student's successful enrollments in a foreign education institutes such as diploma course, foundation program, high school course in western countries and even language course provided by these institutes can be described as "entered famous universities in western countries" to the public. However, due to water high fee band for students from other cities in Jiangsu Province and lower teaching quality than the language education agency such as New Oriental in the Nanjing city, the language courses have never become operational as very few students will choose it.

In 2007, the High School Affiliated to Nanjing Normal University joined in a sister school partnership with Charlotte Country Day School in Charlotte, North Carolina, US. Since 2007, the two schools have organized annual teacher exchanges and student visits.

== Students of this Campus ==
More than 95% of the students in the Jiangning Campus have Chinese Citizenship, mainly local students from Jiangning and the urban area of Nanjing(It requires less grade in the Nanjing High School Entrance Examination to enter Jiangning Campus than the Urban campus of High School Affiliated to Nanjing Normal University), besides there are students from Yancheng, Xuzhou, Huai'an and other places in Jiangsu Province.

Jiangning Campus is one of the Institutions in Jiangsu Province with authority from Chinese Education Administration to provide international education, most of the international students in this high school are from South Korea, others are mainly from Hong Kong and Taiwan.

From 2006, due to the improper administration, several campus unexpected incidents have been taken place among the students. In November 2006, a skirmish between 300 Chinese students and 10 South Korean students, took place in the male students dormitory area, at least 2 Korean students were seriously wounded. Just two weeks later another skirmish between the campus high school students and foundation students of the JESIE took place, while light motorcycle and other weaponry has been used by the foundation students. In January 2008, a Year 9 female student committed suicide by jumping down from a campus building, after her death in the Tongren Hospital, the campus blocked all the information on the internet.

== Facilities ==
According to initial planning, High School Affiliated to Nanjing Normal University Jiangning Campus should contain teaching buildings, a dining hall, laboratory buildings, swimming pool, two finished sports field, and a closed type overline bridge connects the teaching area and the dormitory area. Due to the campus' financial shortage, currently only a main building, six teaching buildings, five laboratory buildings, a dining hall, nine dormitory buildings for students and another three apartment buildings for the staff and teachers have been finished, while only one athletic field have been built without seats for the viewers. The Main Building locates in the centre of the Campus, it contains the school library, piano practice rooms, a meeting hall, a performance hall and other facilities. An astronomy observatory is located on the top of the C5 lab building which is run by the Astronomy Association of the High School Affiliated to Nanjing Normal University Jiangning Campus. Each of the nine buildings dormitory of the Jiangning campus have six floors. Every floor contains around 28 chambers, one large bathroom and a public toilet with four positions. The bathroom uses voucher. Each chamber are equipped with an air conditioner, a toilet and a balcony. Normally 4 students share one chamber. The dining hall locates in the north of the school mall and the south of the dorm buildings with three floors, normally one meal in the dining hall cost 5-10 RMB Yuan.

== Fees and Further costs ==
High School Affiliated to Nanjing Normal University Jiangning Campus is one of the most expensive high school in Nanjing. Compare with a normal market price of US$200 of a public high school in Nanjing the school fee for a single semester of a Chinese citizen student is around $1500 if his or her performance in High School Entrance Examination does not meet the threshold for a much reduced tuition (US$200). While school fee for a single semester of an international student is around $2,500. Other expenses are also higher than other high schools in Nanjing.

== Transport ==
Due to the distance between the city of Nanjing and the campus, only one branchline bus reach the campus. Thus, the school set up a shuttle bus service from Jiangning campus to the city, this service are provided mainly for students live in the city of Nanjing and one return trip cost US$15. Several route options have been made for the trip: Daqiaonanlu Road Route, High School Affiliated to Nanjing Normal University Urban Campus Route, Muxuyuan Street Route and Nanjing International Centre Route. Intercity service have also been established for the students live faraway, including, Nanjing Yangtze River Bridge- Pukou Route, Dongshan Route. During public holidays airport express and countrylink services are also organized. Heavy transport vehicles have been used to deliver students from the campus to the airport, Xuzhou, Yangzhou, Huai'an and Yancheng.

== See also ==
- Nanjing Normal University
- High School Affiliated to Nanjing Normal University
