= Suzhou Confucian Temple =

Confucian temple in Suzhou, Jiangsu, China

Coordinates: 31.2960°N 120.6190°E

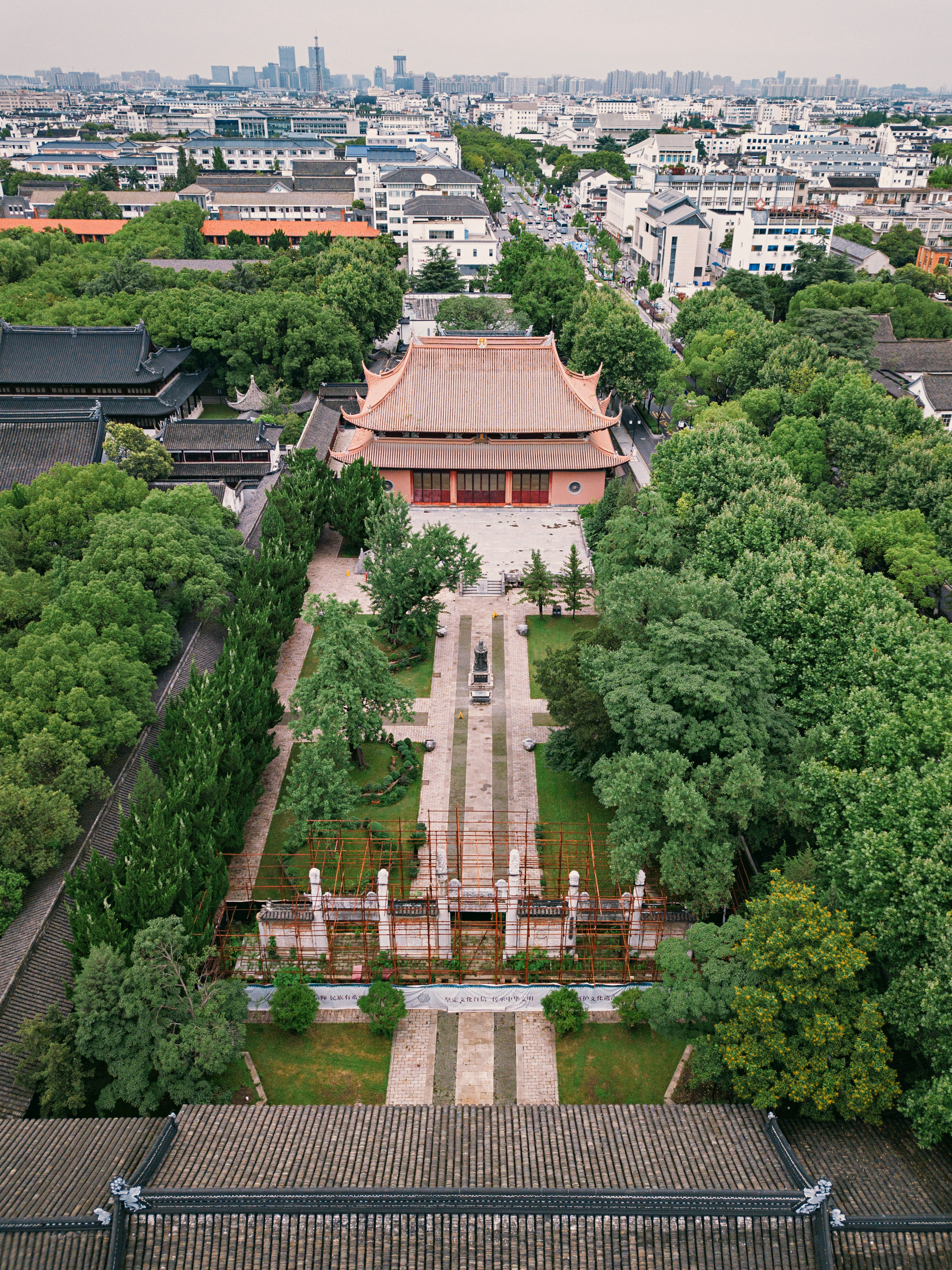
Aerial view of The Dacheng Hall and The Lingxing Men

The Confucian Temple of Suzhou (Chinese: 苏州文庙) and also known as the Suzhou Stone Inscription Museum and Suzhou Prefecture School (Chinese: 苏州府学; a state-run school), is a Confucian temple located in the ancient city of Suzhou, Jiangsu Province, China, on the south bank of the Yangtze River. It was built by Fan Zhongyan, a famous state officer of the Song dynasty. It was the first temple school in China and is notable for containing the four greatest steles of the Song dynasty, of on which is the Map of Pingjiang. In 1961, the stone inscriptions in Suzhou Confucian Temple were listed among the first batch of National Key Cultural Relic Protection Units by The State Council of the People's Republic of China. In 2001, together with the Confucian Temple, it was called Suzhou Confucian Temple and Stone inscription. Presently, it is known as new name as Suzhou Stone Inscription Museum.

== History and architecture ==
Suzhou Confucian Temple is located in the central part of Suzhou, Jiangsu province, China. Built by the order of Fan Zhongyan, then the Prefect of Suzhou, it stands across from the street with Garden of Surging Wave Pavilion. In 1035, Fan Zhongyan was the Prefect of Suzhou. He combined the State School and the Confucian Temple, which began the State education. The system was imitated by other places, for which it got the saying "State education began from Wu County". Suzhou Temple School had been extended several times, so presently, it takes up a large area. According to the record of County Wu, it had 213 rooms during the Southern Song dynasty (in 1241). In its day, it had classrooms, dormitoroes, exam rooms and canteens, besides the hall and temple. Suzhou Temple School also had gardening architecture, for instance, rockery, pond, bridge and pavilion. Its scale is the biggest among schools in the southeast.

With the abolition of the imperial examination system, an examination system in Imperial China designed to select the best administrative officials for the state's bureaucracy, at the end of the Qing dynasty, the Confucian Temple was gradually abandoned.

At present, the temple only occupies 17,800 square metres, which is one sixth of the area when it was in the prime. However, the architectural layout remains, with the temple and the school. In the eastern temple area, only Ji Men, Dacheng Hall and Chongsheng Memorial Temple are left, and in the western school area, only Pan pond, Qixing pond and Minglun Hall are comparatively complete.

Except the Dacheng Hall and the Lingxing Men, most of the architectures we can see now were rebuilt in the Qing dynasty (1864).

Lingxing Men, built in 1373, Ming dynasty, is a huge limestone memorial archway with six columns, three doors and four door leaves.

Dacheng Hall, rebuilt in 1474, Ming dynasty, is 7 rooms wide, 13 purlins deep, Zhong Yan Dianding Veranda, and supported by 50 Nanmu columns.

Outside the hall are limestone platforms on which is a huge bronze statue of Confucius and inside the hall hangs a giant picture of Confucius, both of which are contemporary works.

The magnificent Dacheng Hall, is the main building of Confucian Temple and its scale is second in Suzhou only to Sanqing Hall in Xuanmiao Taoist temple in Suzhou.

== Stone inscriptions ==
There are a substantial number of stone inscriptions in the temple, among which Tianwen Tu 天文圖, Dili Tu 地理圖, Diwangshaoyun Tu 帝王紹運圖, and Pingjiang Tu 平江圖, known as "The Four Great Stone Inscriptions" of the Song dynasty, are the most famous ones. They respectively represent sky, earth, people and city. Formerly placed in Dacheng Hall, they are presently in the wing-room beside the hall, under special protection.

Pingjiang Tu is 2.76m high and 1.48m wide. The wired shade was engraved in the second year in the Shaoding reign of the Southern Song dynasty. This inscription delicately describes the layout situation of the prefectural city of Pingjiang (namely Suzhou today) in that time. It labels 613 places, including defensive wall, officials, temples, business houses, academies, warehouses, barracks, gardens, rivers, bridges, roads and such kinds of architectures and places of interest. Dozens of rivers with a total length of about 82 km and 359 bridges are painted on it. These fully reflect the feature of cities in the Yangtze River Delta. It also records more than 50 temples, 12 ancient towers and 65 cross street arches, lots of which remain today. Since the inscription is of considerable antiquity, some obscure points were carved again in 1917. This stone inscription, Pingjiang Tu, is the oldest and kept the most entirely city plan left in China. It has an extremely high historical value.

The other three steles of the Song dynasty were drawn by Huang Shang in the Shaoxi reign of the south Song (1190), and carved by Wang Zhiyuan in the Chunyou reign (1247). Tianwen Tu, 1.9 meters high and 1.08 meters wide, was the oldest, existing, eastern constellations in the world. 1440 stars and 280 constellations which were observed in the Yuanfeng reign of the North Song were carved on the upper part of the stele. In the bottom of the stele, there are 2091-word notes that briefly introduced some stars and astronomical phenomena. The notes fully reflect the level of astronomy in that time. Dili Tu is 2 meters high and 1.07 meters wide, which carved the mountains and the city of the Song dynasty in detail on the stele. The note in the bottom of the stele is made up of 645 words, which briefly showed the change of China's territory from Yu The Great to the Song dynasty. Dili Tu and Huayi Tu, Yuji Tu from the Stele Forest in Xi'an were listed as the three oldest national maps. Diwangshaoyun Tu is 1.83 meters high and 1 meter wide. In the upper part, it lists the ancient kings' lineage clearly by diagram. In the bottom part, there is a 550-word comment.

Besides the four great steles of the Song dynasty, Suzhou Confucian Temple also holds more than 3000 stone inscriptions and about ten thousand rubbings. These included the famous handwriting and poem steles of Lu Ji, Huang Tingjian, Su Xu, Su Shi, Wen Tianxiang and Wen Zhengming. These collections were displayed according to theme, such as Confucius, Confucianism, economy and ancient calligraphy. In 1985, the Suzhou Confucian Temple was renamed as Suzhou Stone Inscription Museum.

== See also ==
- Suzhou High School
