= Suzhou Lida Middle School =

School in Suzhou, Jiangsu, China

Suzhou Lida Middle School 苏州市立达中学校

Location
- Suzhou, Jiangsu, China

Information
- School type: Middle school
- Founded: 1996
- Status: open
- Authority: Jiangsu Provincial Department of Education
- Principal: Xu Lei
- Website: Suzhou Lida Middle School

The Suzhou Lida Middle School (simplified Chinese: 苏州市立达中学; traditional Chinese: 蘇州市立達中學; pinyin: SūzhōuShì Lìdá zhōngxué) is located in Suzhou, Jiangsu Province, China. It is the de facto affiliated middle school of Suzhou High School. It is a private school subsidized by the city government between 2006 and 2012, and was transformed to a public school in 2012.
