= Lu Longqi =

Qing dynasty politician

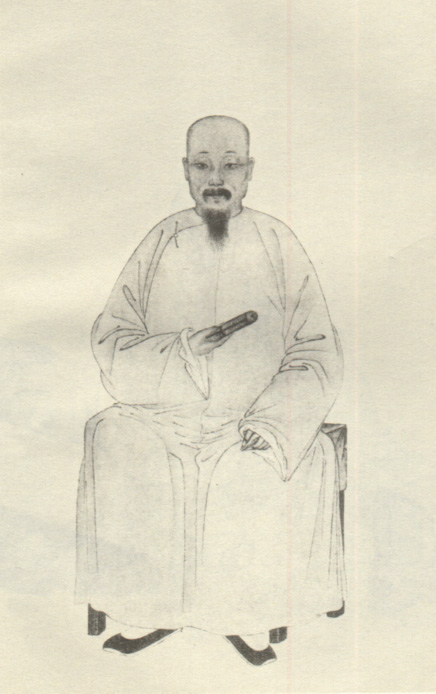
Lu Longqi

Lu Longqi (Chinese: 陸隴其; pinyin: Lù lǒngqí; Wade–Giles: Lu Lung-chi, 21 November 1630 – 1 February 1693) was a Han Chinese official and a prominent Neo-Confucian conservative during the Qing dynasty.

== Biography ==
Lu Longqi
- Traditional Chinese: 陸隴其
- Simplified Chinese: 陆陇其
Transcriptions
Standard Mandarin
- Hanyu Pinyin: Lùlǒngqí

Posthumous name
- Chinese: 淸獻
Transcriptions
Standard Mandarin
- Hanyu Pinyin: Qīngxiàn

Lu originally hailed from Pinghu, Zhejiang. In 1670, he obtained a jinshi degree in the imperial examination. Whilst waiting for an official post, Lu became acquainted with Jesuit missionaries, Ferdinand Verbiest and Lodovico Buglio, who exchanged ideas and books with him, especially on topics such as astronomy. Lu became magistrate of Jiading, Jiangsu in 1675. As a magistrate, he governed virtuously, earning the affection of the local people, as well as provoking animosity from his superiors. Lu was dismissed from office in 1677, following accusations that he exaggerated the importance of a robbery case in an official report. Despite this, Lu maintained a reputation for being an incorruptible official.

Out of office, Lu spent his time teaching and tutoring in Changshu, Jiangsu. In 1678, he was summoned to Beijing to take a special examination called the boxue hongci. However, his father suddenly died, prompting him to forgo the exam and go into mourning instead. Whilst in mourning, Lu continued to study the classics and the works of Zhu Xi, keeping copious notes which were later published in 1708 by Zhang Boxing, an admirer of his. Lu continued teaching in 1681.

Lu returned to official service two years later, becoming magistrate of Lingshou, Zhili. He spent his spare time there compiling local histories, which though popular, drew criticism from famous historians such as Zhang Xuecheng. After his stint as a magistrate, Lu was promoted to censor in 1690. However, not long after, he was sentenced to exile for writing a memorial that criticized the imperial government for selling official posts to fund a military expedition against Galdan. Although pardoned, his superiors threw him out of office in 1691, forcing him to wait for another official post. He returned home once again and resumed teaching. The Kangxi Emperor planned to appoint Lu as education commissioner of Jiangnan, but he had already died the previous year in 1693. The Yongzheng Emperor later honoured Lu by ordering his name to be venerated in the Temple of Confucius. In 1736, the Qianlong Emperor further honoured Lu by posthumously elevating him to the rank of sub-chancellor of the Grand Secretariat, in addition to vice-president of the Board of Rites. He was also bestowed the posthumous name Qīngxiàn (淸獻).
