= Heihe =

Prefecture-level city in China

Heihe 黑河市 Хэйхэ
- Prefecture-level city
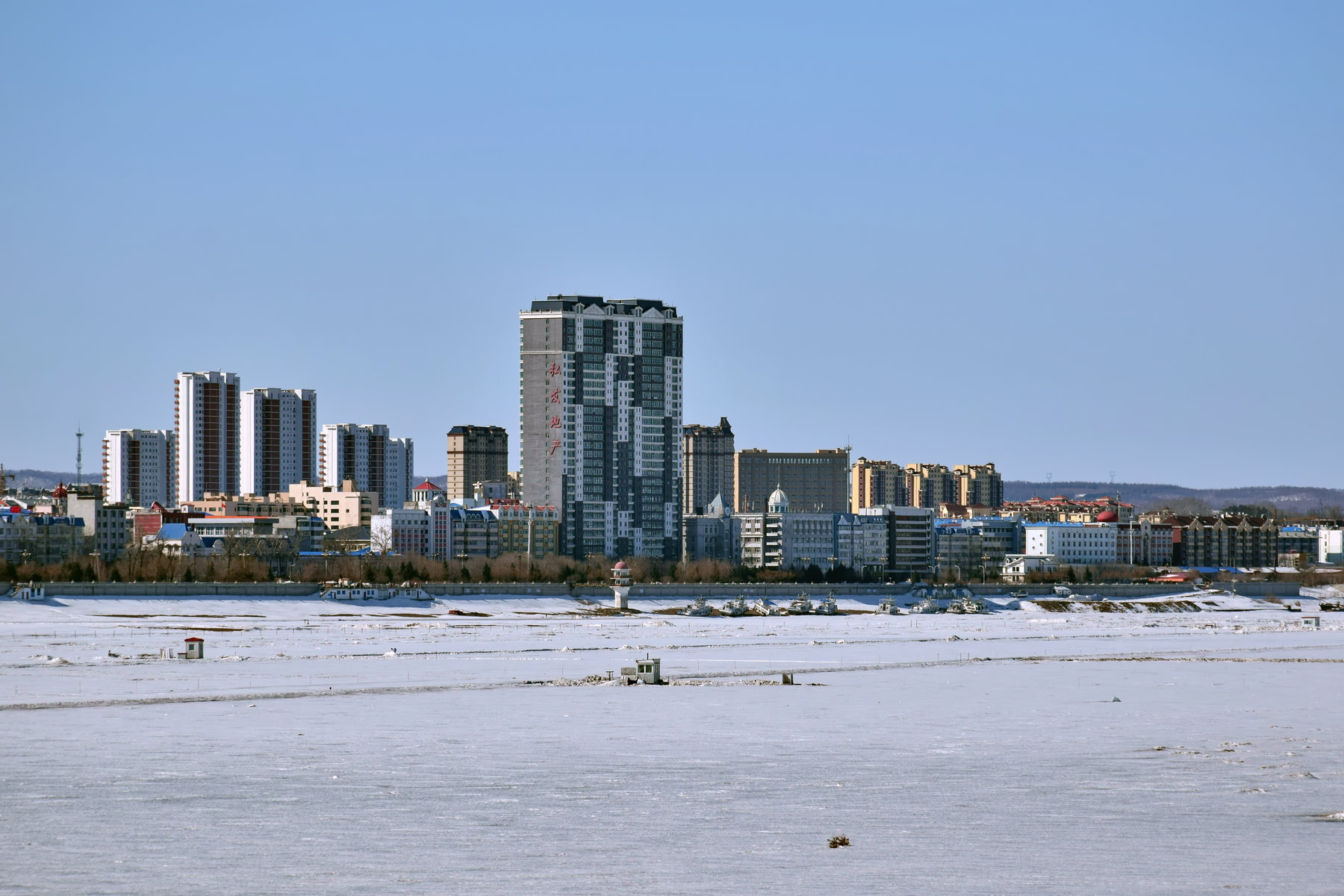
- The Amur River (Heilong Jiang) and Heihe

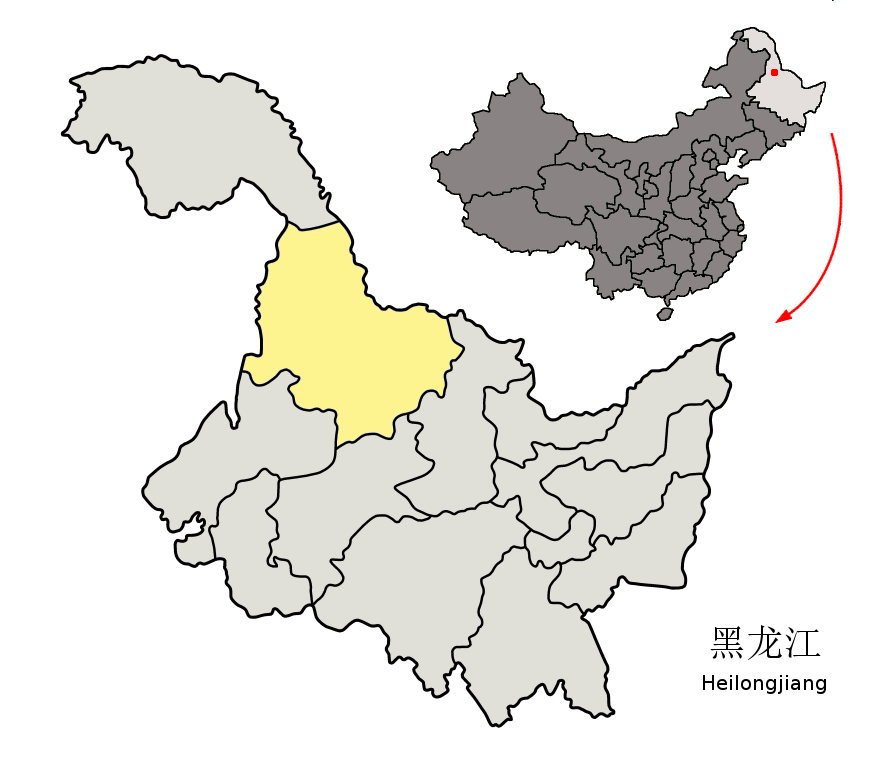
- Location of Heihe City (yellow) in Heilongjiang (light grey)

- Location of the city proper in Heilongjiang Heihe (China)
- Coordinates (Heihe Customs): 50°14′24″N 127°31′16″E
- Country: People's Republic of China
- Province: Heilongjiang
- County-level divisions: 6
- Established: 1683.12.13
- Municipal seat: Aihui District

Government
  - Type: Prefecture-level city
  - CPC Heihe Secretary: Liu Gang (刘刚)
  - Mayor: Zhang Enliang (张恩亮)

Area
  - Prefecture-level city: 54,390 km^{2} (21,000 sq mi)
  - Urban: 1,443 km^{2} (557 sq mi)
  - Metro: 1,443 km^{2} (557 sq mi)

Population (2020 census)
  - Prefecture-level city: 1,286,401
  - Density: 23.65/km^{2} (61.26/sq mi)
  - Urban: 223,832
  - Urban density: 155.1/km^{2} (401.7/sq mi)
  - Metro: 223,832
  - Metro density: 155.1/km^{2} (401.7/sq mi)

GDP
  - Prefecture-level city: CN¥ 44.7 billion US$ 7.2 billion
  - Per capita: CN¥ 26,518; US$ 4,258
- Time zone: UTC+8 (China Standard)
- Postal code: 164300
- Area code: 0456
- ISO 3166 code: CN-HL-11
- Licence plates: 黑N
- Climate: Dwb
- Website: www.heihe.gov.cn

Heihe
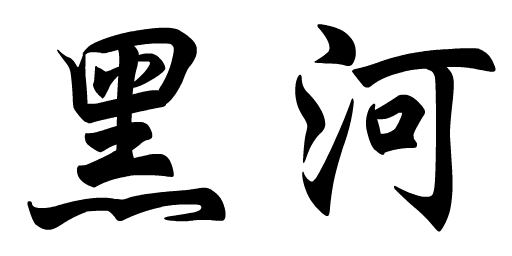
- "Heihe", as written in Chinese

Chinese name
- Chinese: 黑河
- Literal meaning: black river
Transcriptions
Standard Mandarin
- Hanyu Pinyin: Hēihé

Manchu name
- Manchu script: ᠰᠠᡥᠠᠯᡳᠶᠠᠨ ᡠᠯᠠ ᡥᠣᡨᠣᠨ
- Romanization: Sahaliyan'ula hoton

Russian name
- Russian: Хэйхэ

Aigun

Chinese name
- Simplified Chinese: 瑷珲
- Traditional Chinese: 璦琿
- Postal: Aigun
Transcriptions
Standard Mandarin
- Hanyu Pinyin: Àihuī

Manchu name
- Manchu script: ᠠᡳ᠌ᡥᡡᠨ ᡥᠣᡨᠣᠨ
- Romanization: Aihūn hoton

Russian name
- Russian: Айгунь

Heihe (Chinese: 黑河; pinyin: Hēihé; lit. 'Black River'; Russian: Хэйхэ) is a prefecture-level city of northern Heilongjiang province, China, located on the Russian border, on the south bank of the Amur (Heilong) River, across the river from Blagoveshchensk. At the 2020 census, 1,286,401 people lived in the prefecture-level city of whom 223,832 lived in the built-up area (or metro) made of Aihui District. At the end of 2024, the resident population of the city was 1.23 million, including 823,000 in urban areas and 407,000 in rural areas.

Heihe marks the northeast terminus of the diagonal Heihe–Tengchong Line, which is sometimes used to divide China into east and west.

== History ==
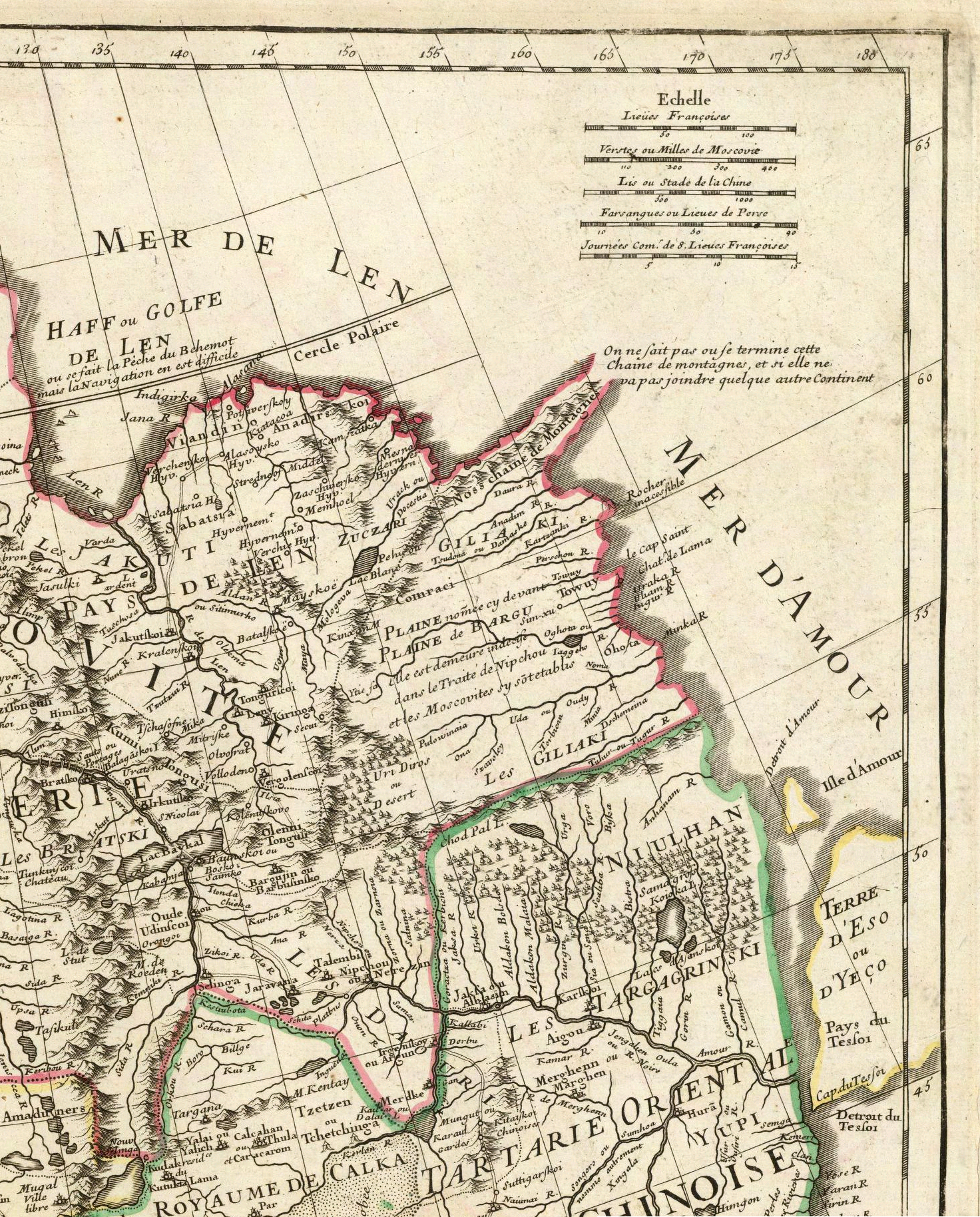
Aigou (Aigun) shown as one of the few towns on the Amur, and one of the most important places in the region, on a 1706 French map

Heihe, formerly Aihui or Aigun, is one of the five oldest cities in Heilongjiang, along with Qiqihar, Yilan, Acheng and Hulan. Human beings started to settle in Heihe region as early as the Paleolithic Age. Later it became home to local tribes. During the Qing dynasty, Heihe was the first place troops sent to Heilongjiang were stationed. The predecessor of today's Heihe was the town established by the indigenous Ducher people of the Amur Valley in the mid-1650s. It was established some 30 km (19 mi) south of the modern city site (in today's Aihui District) and was known as Aigun, Heilongjiang, or Saghalien Ula. (The two last names both mean "the Black Dragon River" – the name for the Amur River in Chinese and Manchu, respectively).

After the Ducher were evacuated by the Qing to the Sungari or Hurka in the 1650s, the Ducher town was probably vacated. However, in 1683–85 the Manchus re-used the site as a base for their campaign against the Russian fort of Albazin. Aigun was the capital (the seat of the military governor) of Heilongjiang from 1683 to 1690, before the capital was moved to Nenjiang (Mergen). After the capture of Albazin in 1685 or 1686, the Qing governor relocated the town to a new site on the right (southwestern) bank of the Amur, about 3 miles downstream from the original. The new site occupied the location of the former village of the Daurian chief named Tolga. The city became known primarily under its Manchu name Saghalien Ula hoton (Manchu: ᠰᠠᡥᠠᠯᡳᠶᠠᠨ
ᡠᠯᠠ
ᡥᠣᡨᠣᠨ sahaliyan ula hoton) and Chinese name Heilongjiang Cheng (黑龍江城), which both mean "Black River City". Later the governor office was transferred to Qiqihar. However, Aigun remained the seat of the Deputy Lieutenant-General (Fu dutong), responsible for a large district covering much of the Amur Valley within the province of Heilongjiang as it existed in those days.

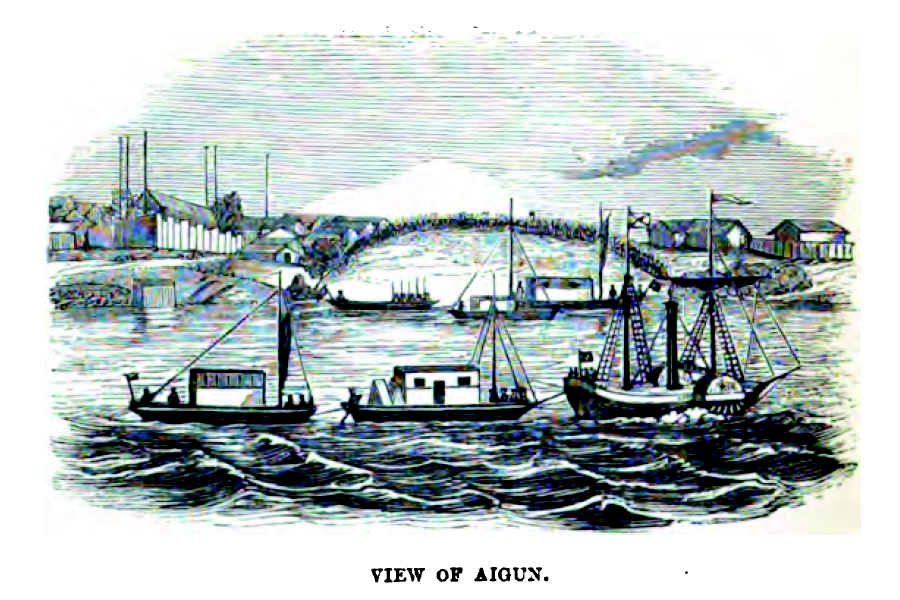
Muravyov's fleet off Aigun in 1854

Aigun was visited around 1709 as a part of a nationwide Sino-French cartographic program by the Jesuits Jean-Baptiste Régis, Pierre Jartoux, and Xavier Ehrenbert Fridelli, who found it a stronghold, serving as the base of Manchus controlling the Amur River basin. The Aigun Treaty was concluded at Aigun in 1858. According to this treaty, the left bank of the Amur River was conceded to Czarist Russia.

After the Xinhai Revolution, Aigun became the county seat of the newly created Aigun County by the Republic of China. On November 15, 1980, Heihe City was established, administering two county-level cities and three counties including Beian, Wudalianchi, Nenjiang, Sunwu and Sunke. Aihui County was abolished, being merged into the Heihe City.

== Geography ==
Heihe is located at the South bank of the Amur, opposite to the city of Blagoveshchensk in Russia's Amur Oblast. Its jurisdictional area stretches for 54,390 km^{2} (21,000 sq mi), which spans from 124° 45' to 129° 18' E longitude and 47° 42' to 51° 03' N latitude. Domestically, Heihe City borders Da Hinggan Ling Prefecture to the north, Yichun to the southeast, Suihua to the south, Qiqihar to the southwest, and Hulunbuir (Inner Mongolia) to the west. The Amur has formed the Sino-Russian border since the 1858 Aigun Treaty and 1860 Treaty of Peking. The area north of the Amur had previously belonged to Imperial China.

=== Climate ===
Heihe experiences a monsoon-influenced humid continental climate (Köppen climate classification Dwb), but Dwa in the south of the prefecture, with long, bitterly cold, windy, but dry winters due to the influence of the Siberian high, and warm, wet summers, due to the East Asian monsoon. Based on data from 1981 to 2010, the monthly daily mean temperature in January, the coldest month, is −22.0 °C (−7.6 °F), and July, the warmest month, averages 21.1 °C (70.0 °F), with an average annual temperature +0.92 °C (33.7 °F). Close to two-thirds of the annual precipitation falls in the months of June to August. Extreme temperatures have ranged from −44.5 °C (−48 °F) to 39.3 °C (103 °F).

Climate data for Heihe (Aihui District), elevation 166 m (545 ft), (1991–2020 normals, extremes 1971–2010)
Month	Jan	Feb	Mar	Apr	May	Jun	Jul	Aug	Sep	Oct	Nov	Dec	Year
Record high °C (°F)	−0.4 (31.3)	7.1 (44.8)	20.4 (68.7)	28.3 (82.9)	35.1 (95.2)	39.3 (102.7)	37.2 (99.0)	35.1 (95.2)	31.1 (88.0)	28.2 (82.8)	12.5 (54.5)	1.1 (34.0)	39.3 (102.7)
Mean daily maximum °C (°F)	−15.6 (3.9)	−9.9 (14.2)	−0.8 (30.6)	10.7 (51.3)	19.4 (66.9)	24.9 (76.8)	27.1 (80.8)	24.9 (76.8)	18.9 (66.0)	8.8 (47.8)	−5.2 (22.6)	−15.3 (4.5)	7.3 (45.2)
Daily mean °C (°F)	−21.6 (−6.9)	−16.9 (1.6)	−7.2 (19.0)	4.5 (40.1)	12.8 (55.0)	18.9 (66.0)	21.6 (70.9)	19.2 (66.6)	12.4 (54.3)	2.8 (37.0)	−10.7 (12.7)	−20.6 (−5.1)	1.3 (34.3)
Mean daily minimum °C (°F)	−26.2 (−15.2)	−22.6 (−8.7)	−13.3 (8.1)	−1.8 (28.8)	6.0 (42.8)	12.7 (54.9)	16.6 (61.9)	14.3 (57.7)	6.8 (44.2)	−2.4 (27.7)	−15.3 (4.5)	−24.8 (−12.6)	−4.2 (24.5)
Record low °C (°F)	−44.5 (−48.1)	−40.9 (−41.6)	−32.8 (−27.0)	−19.1 (−2.4)	−8.4 (16.9)	1.7 (35.1)	7.9 (46.2)	4.0 (39.2)	−5.3 (22.5)	−19.1 (−2.4)	−32.8 (−27.0)	−38.9 (−38.0)	−44.5 (−48.1)
Average precipitation mm (inches)	5.0 (0.20)	5.1 (0.20)	7.0 (0.28)	23.2 (0.91)	55.8 (2.20)	87.5 (3.44)	147.0 (5.79)	112.9 (4.44)	66.4 (2.61)	27.6 (1.09)	11.1 (0.44)	8.1 (0.32)	556.7 (21.92)
Average precipitation days (≥ 0.1 mm)	7.4	4.6	4.9	6.6	10.9	12.8	14.3	14.1	11.0	7.7	7.3	7.9	109.5
Average snowy days	10.4	7.3	7.4	4.6	0.4	0	0	0	0.2	4.9	9.7	11.2	56.1
Average relative humidity (%)	67	62	56	50	54	68	76	78	70	61	66	69	65
Mean monthly sunshine hours	174.3	208.5	256.3	245.0	257.0	263.1	249.5	232.7	219.9	192.4	165.4	153.0	2,617.1
Percentage possible sunshine	65	73	69	59	54	54	51	53	59	59	62	62	60
Source 1: China Meteorological Administration
Source 2: Weather China

== Administrative divisions ==
Name	Hanzi	Hanyu Pinyin	Population (2010 est.)	Area (km^{2})	Density (/km^{2})
Aihui District	爱辉区	Àihuī Qū	211,313	13,993	15.1
Bei'an city	北安市	Běi'ān Shì	436,444	6,313	69.1
Wudalianchi city	五大连池市	Wǔdàliánchí Shì	326,390	9,800	33.3
Nenjiang city	嫩江市	Nènjiāng shì	495,519	15,360	32.3
Xunke County	逊克县	Xùnkè Xiàn	101,411	17,020	6.0
Sunwu County	孙吴县	Sūnwú Xiàn	102,821	4,454	23.1

== Transportation ==
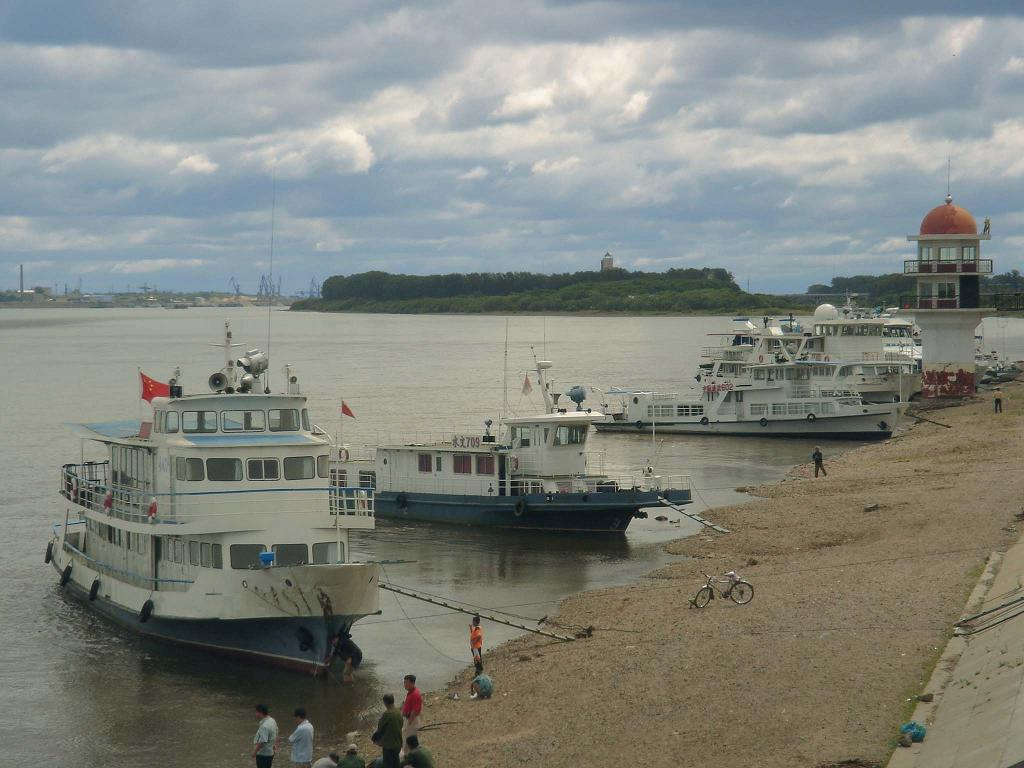

The transportation to and from Heihe is as follows:

- Highways
  - China National Highway 202: Heihe–Dalian via Harbin, Jilin City and Shenyang
  - Provincial highways: Heihe–Mohe, etc.
  - Blagoveshchensk–Heihe Bridge, completed at the end of 2019, is a 2-lane highway bridge over the Amur to link Blagoveshchensk and Heihe.
- Railway (China Railway): Heihe–Bei'an to Harbin, Qiqihar and Daqing
- Air: Heihe Aihui Airport

The world's first international cable car to Blagoveshchensk has also been proposed to open in 2022.

== Energy ==
West of Heihe, there is an HVDC back-to-back station for realizing an interconnection between the power grids of Russia and China with 750 MW transmission capacity.

== Tourism ==
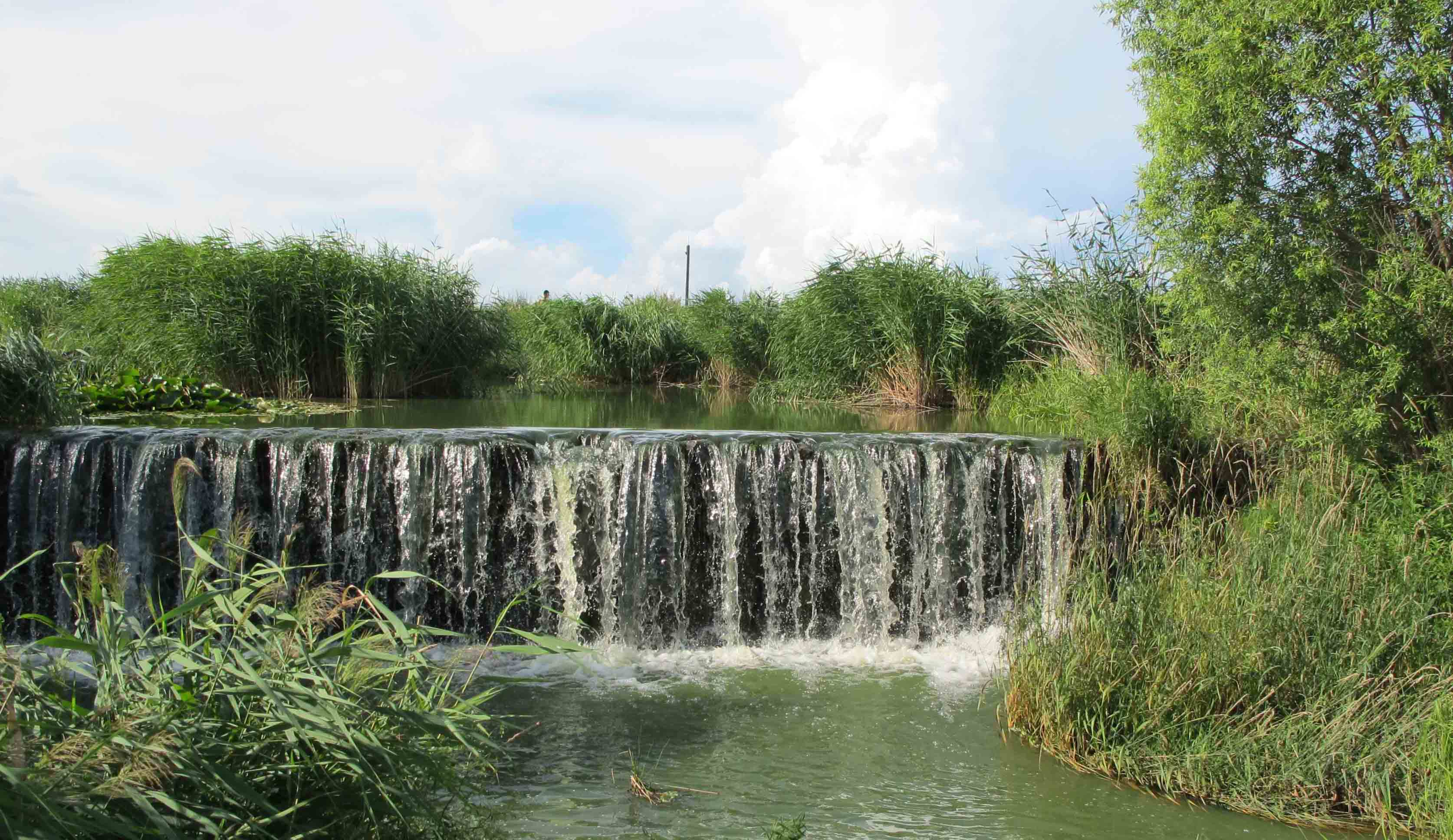
Wudalianchi Volcanic Landforms National Geopark

Heihe has tourist attractions such as Amur River and Wudalianchi Lake and Wudalianchi Volcanic Range, where people can take a trip to local volcanoes. The Old City of Aigun is a famous historical scenic spot, in which the Treaty of Aigun between China and Russia was signed in the 19th century.

== Sport ==
Heihe University (黑河学院) has requested the Russian bandy club SKA Neftyanik to send a coach, offering a one-year contract.

== Sister cities ==
- Blagoveshchensk, Amur Oblast, Russia
- Krasnoyarsk, Krasnoyarsk Krai, Russia
- Yakutsk, Sakha Republic, Russia

== See also ==
- Heihe–Tengchong Line
