= Xunke County =

Xunke County 逊克县
- County
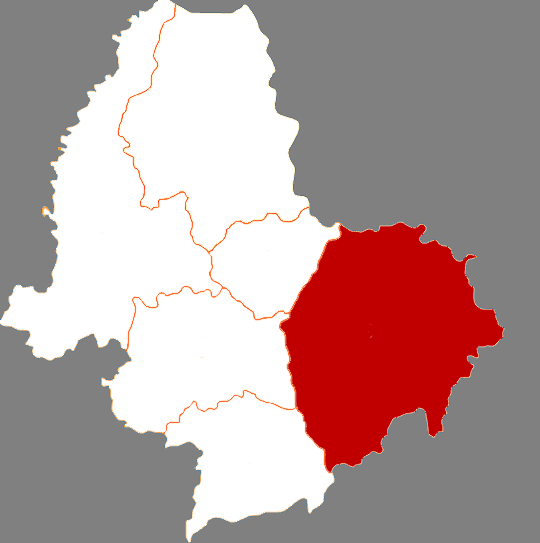
- Xunke in Heihe

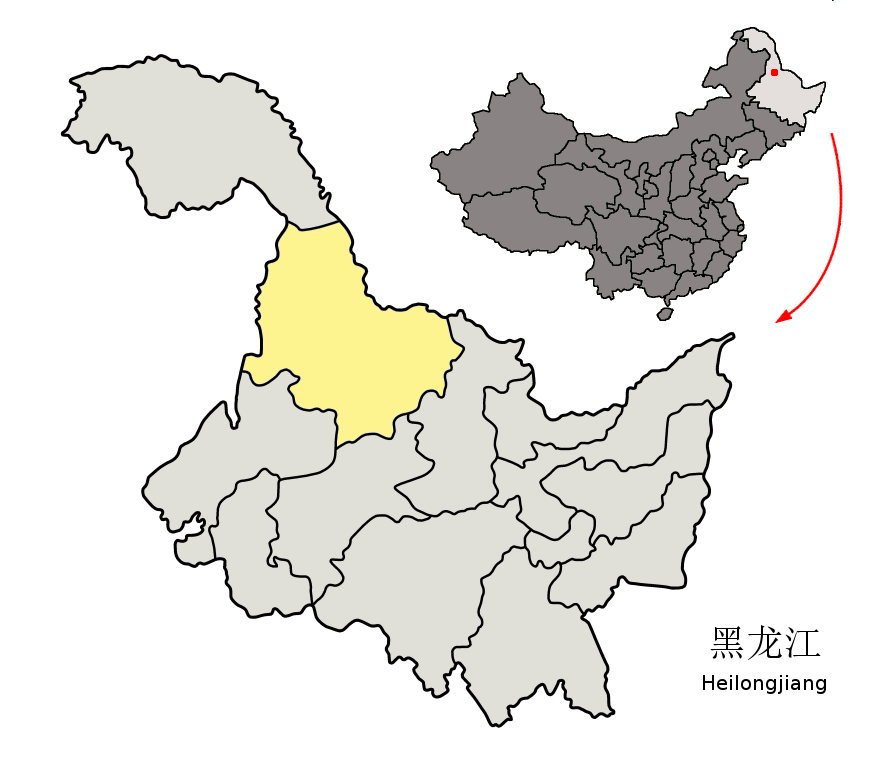
- Heihe in Heilongjiang
- Coordinates: 49°33′50″N 128°28′44″E
- Country: People's Republic of China
- Province: Heilongjiang
- Prefecture-level city: Heihe

Area
  - Total: 17,344 km^{2} (6,697 sq mi)

Population (2023)
  - Total: 82,000
  - Density: 4.7/km^{2} (12/sq mi)
- Time zone: UTC+8 (China Standard)

Xunke County (simplified Chinese: 逊克县; traditional Chinese: 遜克縣; pinyin: Xùnkè Xiàn) is a county under the jurisdiction of the prefecture-level city of Heihe, in northern Heilongjiang province, China, bordering Russia's Amur Oblast to the north across the Amur River. It is under the jurisdiction of the prefecture-level city of Heihe. The county spans an area of 17,344 square kilometres (6,697 mi^{2}), and has a population of about 82,000.

== Toponymy ==
Xunke County got its name from a portmanteau of two previously existing counties in the area: Xunhe County (Chinese: 逊河县) and Qike County (Chinese: 奇克县). Xunhe County derived its name from the nearby Xunbiela River, which means "milk river" in Manchu. Qike derived its name from a nearby mountain called Qikele (Chinese: 奇克勒). The pronunciation of Qikele shifted to Qikete (Chinese: 奇克特) over time, and would commonly be shorted to Qike.

== History ==
There have been human activities in Xunke County as early as the late Neolithic period.

During the time of the Jin dynasty, the area of present-day Xunke County was inhabited by the Jurchen people.

A number of refugees from the Sixty-Four Villages East of the River fleeing the 1900 Amur anti-Chinese pogroms resettled in present-day Xunke County.

After the 1911 Revolution, in 1913, the Aihui Zhili Ting, which governed the area, was restructured as Aihui County. Qikete, corresponding to present-day Xunke County, was reclassified as the Fourth District of Aihui County. In 1915, Qikete was reclassified from a karun to a county assistant. In 1929, Qikete County Assistant was renamed and reorganized as Qike County.

In 1933, Imperial Japan invaded and occupied the area, and established their own county governments in the area. In 1943, Japan merged the two counties it established in the area, Xunhe County and Qike County, into Xunke County.

In June 1946, the Northeastern People's Liberation Army established county offices. By 1947, the People's Liberation Army established full control of the area.

== Administrative divisions ==
Xunke County is divided into three towns, six townships, and seven other township-level divisions.

The county's three towns are Qike, Xunhe, and Kelin.

The county's six townships are Ganchazi Township, Songshugou Township, Chelu Township, Xin'e Township, Xinxing Township, and Baoshan Township.

Xunke County also administers seven other township-level divisions: Daogan Tree Farm (Chinese: 道干林场), Ganchazi Tree Farm (Chinese: 干岔子林场), Xinli Tree Farm (Chinese: 新立林场), Sanjianfang Tree Farm (Chinese: 三间房林场), Xunke County Seed Farm (Chinese: 逊克县良种场), Xunke County Breeding Farm (Chinese: 逊克县种畜场), and Xunke Farm.

== Demographics ==
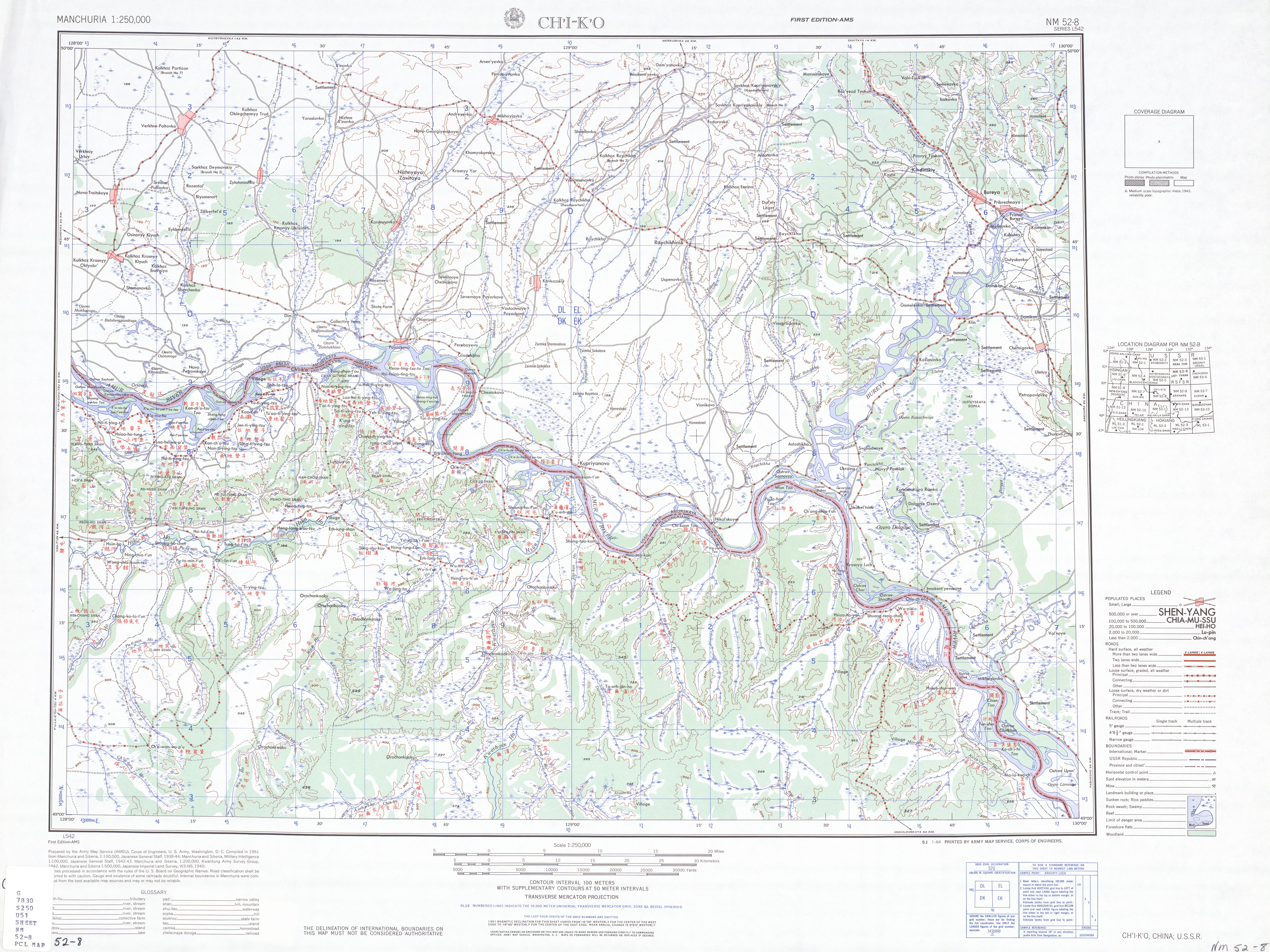
Qike (labelled as Ch'i-k'o 奇克) (1951)

Xunke County has a population of about 82,000, per a 2023 government publication. The population of the county was 99,740 in 1999.

=== Ethnicity ===
Xunke County is predominantly Han Chinese, who comprise about 90% of the county population. The county has 22 ethnic minorities, including the Oroqen, Russians, and the Daur.

Per a 2023 government population, 1,257 Oroqen people live in Xunke County, accounting for approximately one-seventh of China's total Oroqen population. Within Xunke County, the Oroqen primarily live in Xin'e Township and Xinxing Township.

Approximately 1,200 ethnic Russians live in Xunke County. The county has five Russian ethnic villages. Approximately one-third of the county's ethnic Russians live in Bianjiang Village (Chinese: 边疆村) within the town of Qike.

== Climate ==
Climate data for Xunke, elevation 116 m (381 ft), (1991–2020 normals, extremes 1981–2010)
Month	Jan	Feb	Mar	Apr	May	Jun	Jul	Aug	Sep	Oct	Nov	Dec	Year
Record high °C (°F)	−4.2 (24.4)	2.9 (37.2)	14.4 (57.9)	28.6 (83.5)	34.3 (93.7)	39.0 (102.2)	36.6 (97.9)	33.2 (91.8)	32.2 (90.0)	28.0 (82.4)	12.2 (54.0)	0.2 (32.4)	39.0 (102.2)
Mean daily maximum °C (°F)	−17.1 (1.2)	−11.1 (12.0)	−1.2 (29.8)	10.9 (51.6)	19.9 (67.8)	25.2 (77.4)	27.4 (81.3)	25.2 (77.4)	19.5 (67.1)	9.3 (48.7)	−4.9 (23.2)	−16.0 (3.2)	7.3 (45.1)
Daily mean °C (°F)	−22.7 (−8.9)	−17.8 (0.0)	−7.5 (18.5)	4.8 (40.6)	13.3 (55.9)	19.3 (66.7)	22.0 (71.6)	19.7 (67.5)	13.1 (55.6)	3.5 (38.3)	−10 (14)	−20.9 (−5.6)	1.4 (34.5)
Mean daily minimum °C (°F)	−27.9 (−18.2)	−24.1 (−11.4)	−13.9 (7.0)	−1.2 (29.8)	6.6 (43.9)	13.4 (56.1)	17.0 (62.6)	14.9 (58.8)	7.4 (45.3)	−1.6 (29.1)	−14.7 (5.5)	−25.6 (−14.1)	−4.1 (24.5)
Record low °C (°F)	−40.6 (−41.1)	−40.5 (−40.9)	−30.0 (−22.0)	−14.4 (6.1)	−4.6 (23.7)	2.6 (36.7)	8.3 (46.9)	3.5 (38.3)	−5.3 (22.5)	−17.8 (0.0)	−35.3 (−31.5)	−41.4 (−42.5)	−41.4 (−42.5)
Average precipitation mm (inches)	6.4 (0.25)	5.5 (0.22)	11.0 (0.43)	21.3 (0.84)	48.9 (1.93)	76.6 (3.02)	136.4 (5.37)	100.4 (3.95)	55.4 (2.18)	30.2 (1.19)	13.0 (0.51)	10.7 (0.42)	515.8 (20.31)
Average precipitation days (≥ 0.1 mm)	8.1	4.8	5.2	7.5	11.1	12.9	14.6	14.1	10.8	8.3	8.0	9.2	114.6
Average snowy days	10.5	7.4	7.0	4.2	0.3	0	0	0	0.1	4.7	9.9	12.0	56.1
Average relative humidity (%)	72	68	63	54	55	68	77	79	71	63	69	72	68
Mean monthly sunshine hours	173.5	206.8	250.2	233.8	241.9	241.4	226.3	211.8	203.7	178.7	160.5	149.5	2,478.1
Percentage possible sunshine	64	72	67	56	51	50	47	48	55	54	60	59	57
Source: China Meteorological Administration
