= Wang Maozu =

Chinese educationist and philosopher

Wang Maozu 汪懋祖
- Born: 4 March 1891; Suzhou, Jiangsu, Qing Empire
- Died: January 9, 1949 (aged 57); Suzhou, Jiangsu, China

Academic background
- Education: Columbia University
- Influences: John Dewey

Wang Maozu (Chinese: 汪懋祖; pinyin: Wāng Màozǔ; 4 March 1891 - 9 January 1949) was a Chinese educationist and philosopher. In the 1920s, he earned his master's degree at the Teachers College, Columbia University under the instruction of John Dewey, then became a researcher at Harvard University. Several years later, he returned to China and taught at Beijing Normal University, Beijing Women's Normal College and National Central University.

In 1927, he resigned from National Central University and established Suzhou High School, based on Jiangsu Provincial No.1 Normal School. During the Second Sino-Japanese War, he was a professor at the National Southwestern Associated University.
