= Hu Ning =

Chinese physicist and writer

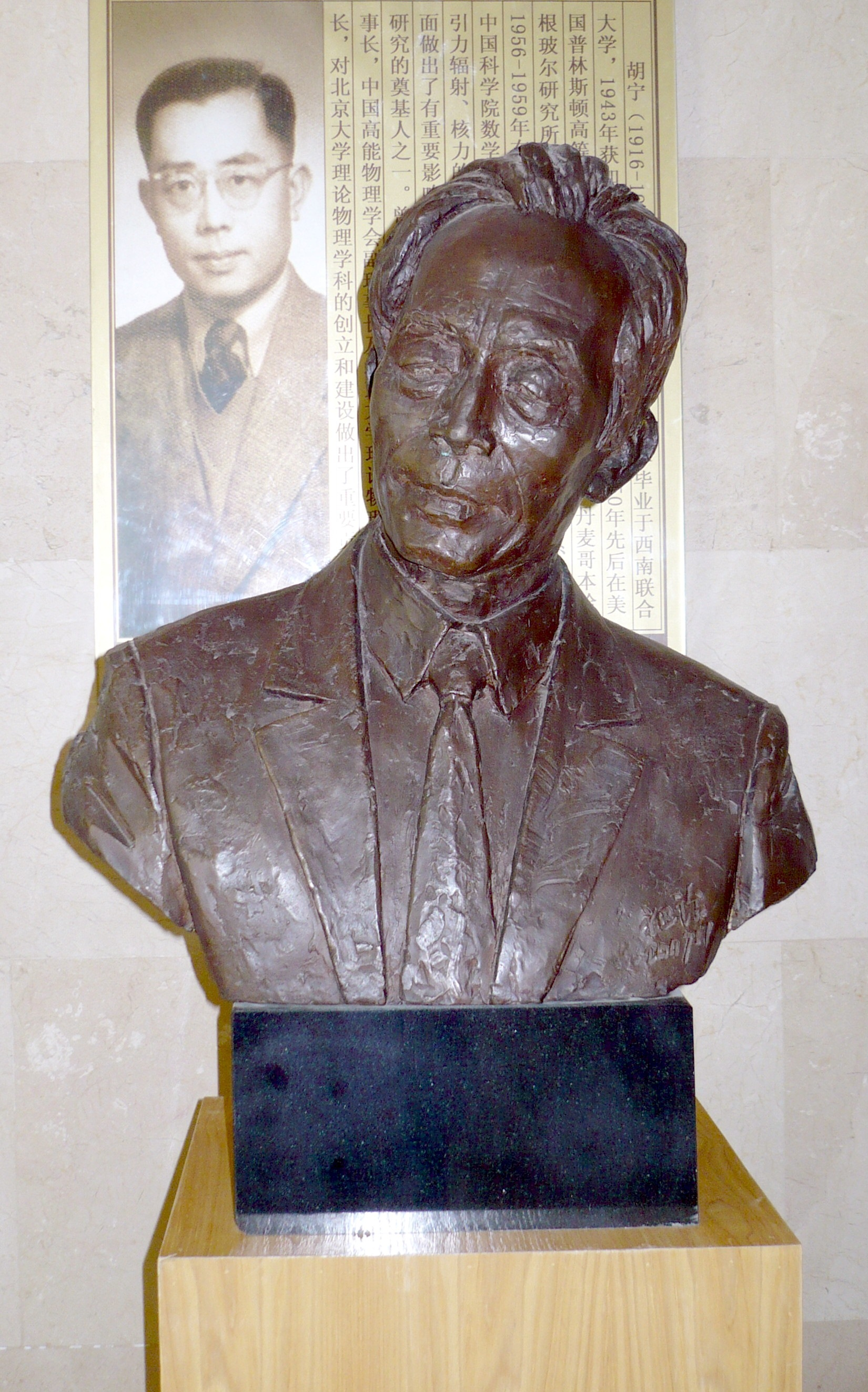
A bronze statue of Hu Ning at Peking University

Hu Ning (simplified Chinese: 胡宁; traditional Chinese: 胡寧; 1916–1997) was a Chinese physicist and writer.

== Biography ==
Hu was born in Suqian, Jiangsu, China on 11 February 1916. From 1928 to 1934, Hu studied at the Zhenjiang High School (镇江中学) in Zhenjiang, and Suzhou High School in Suzhou. In 1935, Hu studied at the physical department of Zhejiang University in Hangzhou, Zhejiang. From 1935 to 1937, Hu studied in the department of physics at Tsinghua University in Beijing, where he graduated in 1938.

After his graduation from Tsinghua, Hu became the teaching assistant for his professor Zhou Peiyuan in the department of physics.

In 1940, Hu examed and won the Boxer Indemnity Scholarship Program. In 1941, Hu went to study in the United States. Hu studied fluid mechanics at the California Institute of Technology. His doctoral advisor was Theodore von Kármán. Hu also studied quantum mechanics under Paul Sophus Epstein during this period. Hu obtained his PhD in 1943 from Caltech.

From 1944 to 1945, Hu stayed at the Institute for Advanced Study in Princeton, New Jersey, and studied quantum field theory and basic particles theories under Wolfgang Pauli. From 1946 to 1949, Hu visited Europe. He worked at the Dublin Institute for Advanced Studies in Dublin, Ireland between 1946 and 1948. During this time he also visited the Niels Bohr Institute in Copenhagen. Hu went back to the United States, and from 1949 to 1950, Hu did research at the nuclear physics department of the Cornell University, New York.

In 1950, invited by the physicist Ta-You Wu (at that time, Wu headed the Theoretical Physics Division of the Canadian National Research Council), Hu went to Canada, and did research and lectured there.

In 1951, Hu accepted the invitation from Peking University in Beijing, and went back to China. Hu was a long-time professor in the department of physics at Peking University. Since 1953, Hu was a researcher at the Institute of Modern Physics (近代物理研究所) and the Institute of Nuclear Physics (原子能研究所) of the Chinese Academy of Sciences. From 1956 to 1959, Hu was a researcher and group leader at the Joint Institute for Nuclear Research, USSR. Since 1980, Hu was a researcher at the Institute of Theoretical Physics (理論物理研究所) of the Chinese Academy of Sciences in Beijing.

Hu was elected academician of the Chinese Academy of Sciences in 1955. Hu was appointed the first director-general of Peking University Research Institute of Theoretical Physics (北京大學理論物理研究所).

Hu died in Beijing on 16 December 1997.

== Publications ==
Hu wrote or edited some earliest textbooks of relativity and quantum physics in China, which are still in use:

- 《電動力學》 (Electrodynamics); 1963
- 《场的量子理论》 (Quantum Field Theory); 1964
- 《廣義相對論和引力場理論》 (General Relativity and Gravitation); ISBN 7-03-007835-7; republished in 2000
