= High School Affiliated to Nanjing Normal University =

Coordinates: 32°04′45″N 118°45′09″E

The High School Affiliated to Nanjing Normal University
- Nanjing, Jiangsu China

Information
- Type: Public, secondary
- Established: 1902
- Campus: Urban
- Website: Official site

High School Affiliated to Nanjing Normal University (Chinese: 南京师范大学附属中学), abbreviated as NSFZ (南师附中), is a high school located in Nanjing, China.

== History ==
The school was founded in 1902, and was known as High School Affiliated to National Central University (國立中央大學附屬中學) before 1949, and High School Affiliated to Nanjing University (南京大學附屬中學) for a short period later, until 1952.

The institution maintains two campuses. It has been the home of the Nanjing campus of Caulfield Grammar School, an independent Australian institution that has maintained an internationalism program in China since 1998, at its main campus. Students from Caulfield reside on the campus for five-week programs, during which they engage in two-day homestay visits with students from the High School Affiliated to Nanjing Normal University.

In 2007, the High School Affiliated to Nanjing Normal University established a sister school partnership with Charlotte Country Day School in Charlotte, North Carolina, United States. Teacher exchanges and pupil visits have been conducted annually between the two institutions since 2007.

High School Affiliated to Nanjing Normal University is nationally and regionally recognized and received titles and awards such as National Model High School, Basic Education Reform Experiment School (Ministry of Education), Top Ten Schools of Basic Education in China, Key Middle School of Jiangsu, Model School of Jiangsu, and Top Four Schools of Jiangsu Province. The school is also a member of International School Connection. In 2007, the school became a member of International Baccalaureate and now offers IB Diploma Programme taught in English. In a 2016 ranking of Chinese high schools that send students to study in American universities, it ranked number 22 in mainland China in terms of the number of students entering top American universities.

The school sets up several international exchange programs in cooperation with Caulfield High School in Australia. Students from the two countries live together and have both Chinese and English Classes. Not only does the program offer students an international academic environment, but it also fosters the relationship between the two countries.

== Notable educators ==
- Liu Yizheng: historian
- Hu Xiansu- botanist
- Chang Chi-yun: historian, founder of the Chinese Culture University and the Nanhai Academy, former Minister of Education of Republic of China
- Hu Huanyong: demographer, founder of China's population geography
- Luo Jialun: historian, former president of National Central University (Nanjing University) and Tsinghua University

== Notable alumni ==
Politics

- Kwoh-Ting Li: economist, former Finance Minister of Republic of China, a founder of Hsinchu Science Park. He was known as the Father of Taiwan's Economic Miracle
- Wang Daohan: former mayor of Shanghai, first president of the Association for Relations Across the Taiwan Straits

Academia

- Qu Bochuan: chemist, founder of the Dalian University of Technology
- Wang Hao: logician, philosopher and mathematician.
- Yuan Longping: fellow of the Chinese Academy of Sciences and the Chinese Academy of Engineering.
- Wang Gungwu: historian, Academician at Academia Sinica, former president of University of Hong Kong

Culture

- Ba Jin: writer, author of The Family
- Yu Chi-chung (余紀忠), founder of China Times

Military

- Sun Yuanliang: former general of the National Revolutionary Army

== Related links ==
- Official site (in Chinese)
- High School Affiliated to Nanjing Normal University Jiangning Campus
- High School Affiliated to Nanjing Normal University Alumni Group on Linkedin
