= International School Connection =

Non-profit education organization based in Tampa, Florida

- Type: Non-profit organization
- Founded: 1994
- Headquarters: Tampa, Florida
- Key people: Dr. Karolyn J. Snyder, President Dan Hector, Chief Financial Officer; Dr. Elaine Sullivan, Vice President; Dr. Kristen M. Snyder, Vice President Hans Forsberg, Vice President
- Website: www.iscweb.org

The International School Connection (ISC) is a non-profit education organization based in Tampa, Florida of the United States of America. It has an international Board of Directors, Officers, and Regional Hub coordinators that represent 15 countries on four continents. Over the last decade, the ISC has evolved from regional partnerships to a multi-national university cooperative, and an independent non-governmental agency. Member schools come from Russia, Finland, Sweden, Norway, Spain, Germany, Canada, USA, Colombia, Venezuela, Malaysia, China, and Singapore. Exploratory conversations are underway with educators in Brazil, Netherlands Antilles, Mexico, and New Zealand.

== History ==
The ISC began its early formation in 1994 during a conference in Berlin. Educators from Sweden, Russia, Finland, the Netherlands and the USA met to explore ways to create international school connections. A conference was held in Sochi, Russia the following year, under the guidance of Conny Bjorkman (Sweden) and Ivan Prodanov and Irina Badayan (Russia). Many cross border school connections were made in the following years. Eventually Karolyn Snyder and Conny Bjorkman assumed leadership roles in developing a system of connections through the University of South Florida and Mid Sweden University.

In 1997, leaders from seven universities in seven countries signed an agreement, in Stockholm, to develop the International School Connection as a support system for schools and their leaders. In 2000 a three-year pilot project was launched with graduate programs and a professional development program being offered in a web-based environment. A Masters Degree Program and a Doctoral Program were offered by the University of South Florida in Tampa, FL USA, which was created by Waynne James and Karolyn Snyder. In 2003, near the completion of the pilot, the ISC became a non-profit organization in the USA, with an international Board of Directors and Officers.

== Current Board of Directors ==
- John Fitzgerald
- Victor Pinedo, Jr.
- Xinmin Sang
- Hans-Erik Persson
- Paul Senft, Jr.
- Robert H. Anderson
- Dan Hector
- Kristen M. Snyder
- Joyce Burick Swarzman
- Kai Sung
- Elaine Sullivan
- Karolyn J. Snyder
- Waynne James

== ISC Vision ==
For school and college leaders and faculty members to become global educators who prepare all students during their education years for a successful life as a global citizen.

== Notable Member Schools ==
- A. Y. Jackson Secondary School
- Beijing 101 Middle School
- High School Affiliated to Nanjing Normal University
- Corbett Preparatory School of IDS
