= Qinling–Huaihe Line =

Geographic boundary between northern and southern China

China in the 12th century. The north of the Qinling–Huaihe Line was under control of the Jin dynasty, while the south was under control of the Song dynasty

The Qinling–Huaihe Line (Chinese: 秦岭淮河线; pinyin: Qínlǐng Huáihé Xiàn) is a reference line used by geographers to distinguish between northern and southern China, corresponding roughly to the 33rd parallel. Qinling refers to the Qin Mountains, and Huaihe refers to the Huai River. Running from Qin Mountain in the west to Huai River in the east, it divides eastern China into northern and southern regions that differ from each other in climate, culture, lifestyle, and cuisine.

Regions north of the Line tend to be temperate or continental, with snow being a regular feature in winter. Regions south of the Line tend to be subtropical or tropical. In general, the southern region is hotter, wetter, and much more hilly than the northern region.

== History ==
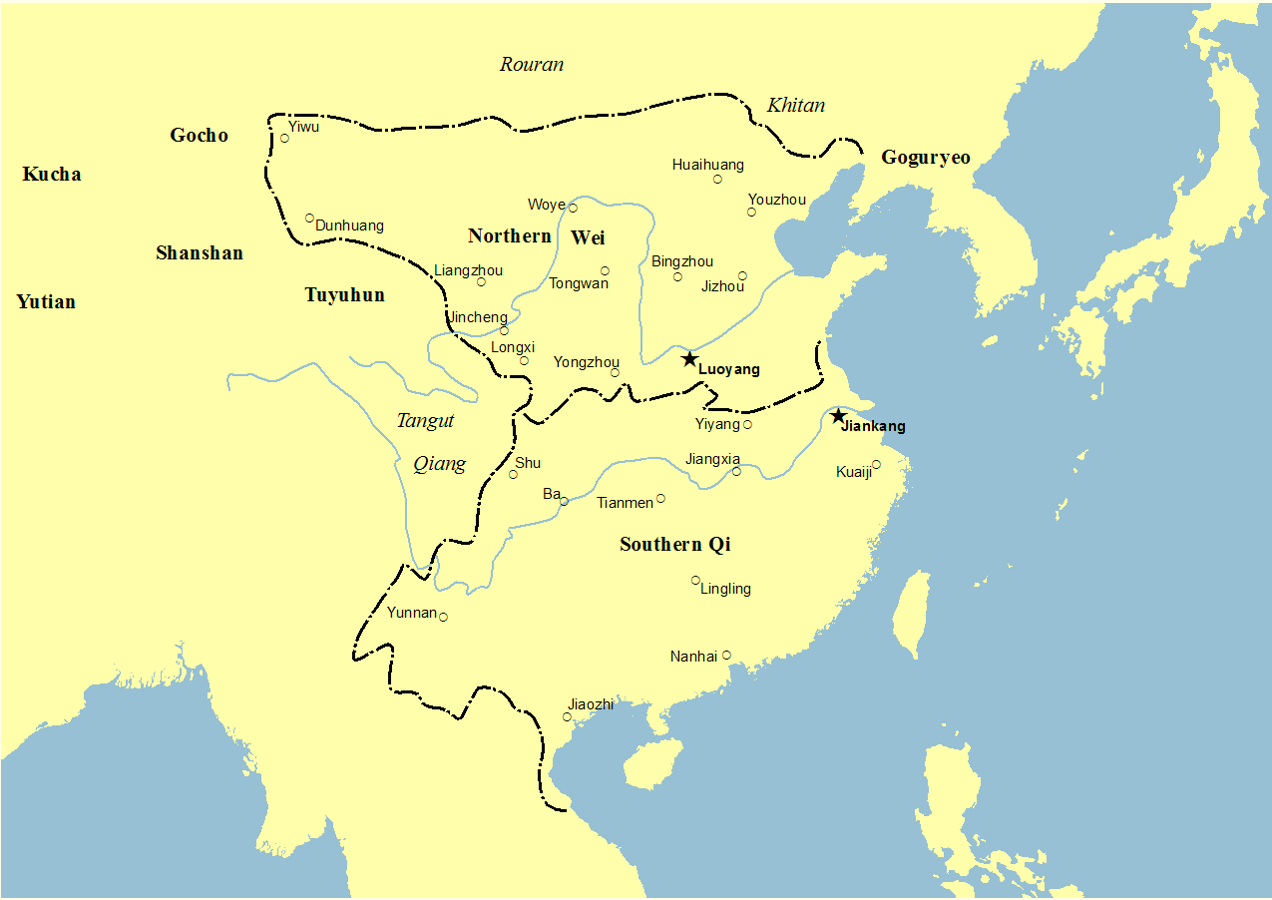
Northern and Southern Dynasties circa 497: Northern Wei and Southern Qi.

The line has served as the border between northern and southern Chinese dynasties: between the Northern and Southern dynasties of c. 3rd–6th century and between the Southern Song of c. 13th century and its northern neighbor Jin dynasty.

Historically, due to being the Cradle of Chinese Civilization, the North had been more developed than the South. That has changed over time and three of the four most developed tier-1 cities in China are in the South. It was in the Ming dynasty that the economy of the South started to outpace the economy of the North. The gross regional domestic product (GRDP) of provinces and counties below the line was equal to those above the line in 1960, but by 2019, the South's GRDP had become 83% larger than the North's.

In 1908, Chinese geographer Zhang Xiangwen defined northern China as anything above a line running along the Qinling in the west and the Huai River the east.

== Cultural significance ==
In the 1950s, when large social projects were common yet the country was poor, it was decided that subsidized district heating systems would only be installed north of the line. Because the major source of heating came from coal-fired power stations as of 2010, the north has historically suffered from heavier air pollution. Nevertheless, a 2014 poll suggests that southerners also want central heating. Some places just south of the Qinling–Huaihe Line can become quite cold in the winter, making life difficult especially for those who cannot afford electrical heating at the market rate. Central heating does not allow for individual regulation, so it can sometimes get too warm.

== Climate and geographical significance ==
Köppen climate types of China, Qinling–Huaihe is the division line between colder northern China and temperate southern China.

The line is attributed with serving as a division line in the hydrology and climatology of China. It roughly coincides with:

- the 800 mm (31 in) annual precipitation line (isohyet) of China; by extension, the division between China's humid and semi-humid areas and rice or wheat production areas;
- the 0 °C (32 °F) average January temperature (isotherm) line of China; by extension, China's subtropic zone;
- the division between the drainage basins of the Yangtze and Yellow Rivers.

== Archaeological and Disease Barrier Theory ==
The Qinling–Huaihe Line has been proposed to have acted as a disease barrier during the Upper Palaeolithic (30,000–10,000 years ago). Mathematical modeling suggests that infectious diseases prevalent in the south—including Plasmodium vivax malaria and human papillomavirus—stopped northern populations expanding southward despite their technological advantages. This theory explains why microblade technology, which originated in northern East Asia around 30-25 kya, spread south only as far as the Qinling–Huaihe Line but did not penetrate into southern China until the Holocene. An alternative "bamboo hypothesis" suggests that southern populations below the Qinling–Huaihe Line used perishable bamboo tools instead of stone microblades. However, this hypothesis fails to explain why bamboo would stop the additional use of stone technologies. The disease barrier hypothesis aligns with genetic evidence showing that populations north and south of this line had genetically differentiated by at least 19,000 years ago.

== See also ==
- Heihe–Tengchong Line, divides China in northeastern and southwestern halves
- Mason–Dixon line, North American counterpart
