= Zhang Boxing (Qing dynasty) =

Qing dynasty politician (1652–1723)

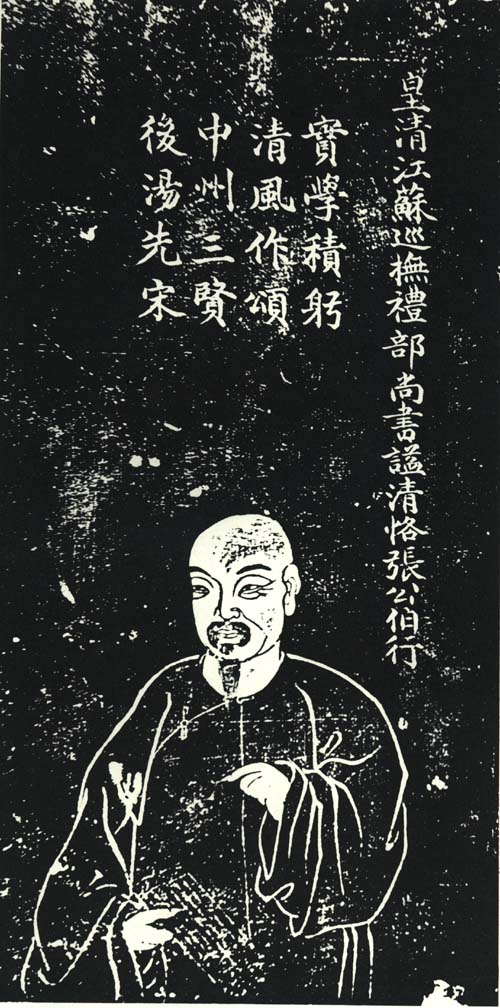

Minister of Rites
- In office October 4, 1723 – April 5, 1725
- Preceded by: Zhang Tingyu
- Succeeded by: Li Zhouwang

Personal details
- Born: January 15, 1652; Yifeng, Henan
- Died: February 28, 1723 (aged 71)

Zhang Boxing (Chinese: 張伯行; pinyin: Zhāng bóxíng; Wade–Giles: Chang Po-hsing, 15 January 1652 – 28 February 1723) was a Han Chinese politician and scholar in the Qing dynasty.

== Biography ==
Zhang Boxing
- Traditional Chinese: 張伯行
- Simplified Chinese: 张伯行
Transcriptions
Standard Mandarin
- Hanyu Pinyin: Zhāng bóxíng

Posthumous name
- Chinese: 淸恪
Transcriptions
Standard Mandarin
- Hanyu Pinyin: Qīngkè

Zhang was a native of Yifeng, Henan. He was awarded a jinshi degree in the imperial examination of 1685, becoming a secretary in the Grand Secretariat in 1692. He returned home early in 1695 after his father's death and spent the next few years of his life teaching and studying. In 1699, Zhang led local efforts to combat flooding after a dike in the Yellow River burst and flooded Yifeng. His work caught the attention of the director-general of River Conservancy, Zhang Pengge, who subsequently tasked Zhang with supervising seventy miles of repairs. He was then made intendant of the Jining Circuit, Shandong, where he helped relieve famine and floods in 1703. Three years later, Zhang was appointed judicial commissioner in Jiangsu before becoming governor of Fujian in 1707 and receiving a special commendation from the emperor. As governor, he quickly relieved famines in three districts in Formosa and stabilized the price of grain in Fujian. In addition, Zhang paid special attention to education, establishing academies and converting temples into free schools.

Zhang continued his work fighting floods and famine when he became governor of Jiangsu in 1710. However, his reputation for integrity and clean government soon put him at odds with his superior, Gali, the Manchu governor-general of the province. According to historian R. Guy Kent, 'Both officials broke the code of silence, indicting each other in one of the loudest and most colorful exchanges of official broadsides in the early eighteenth century.' Among other offences, Gali accused Zhang of dereliction of duty and reading on the job while Zhang claimed his Manchu superior accepted bribes from juren candidates in the provincial examinations.

Their famously heated conflict eventually led to the establishment of a commission charged with investigating the accusations they made against each other. Although Zhang was sentenced to death by the Ministry of Justice, his honest character convinced the emperor to dismiss the unfavourable reports made against him. While both Gali and Zhang were officially dismissed, the latter was allowed to remain at his post. In 1715, Zhang was summoned to Beijing. The emperor appointed him to the Imperial Study and also made him acting superintendent of government granaries. In 1720, Zhang was made vice-president of the Board of Revenue, which he served concurrently with his role as superintendent of granaries. He was made Minister of Rites by the Yongzheng Emperor in 1723. He died in 1725 and was honoured with the posthumous name Qīngkè (淸恪) and the title of Grand Guardian of the Heir Apparent. In 1878, Zhang was further honoured with his name's inclusion in the Temple of Confucius.

== Literature ==
During his life, Zhang wrote fourteen titles noted in the Imperial Catalogue, mostly concerning philosophy and ethics. He was an avid proponent of Zhu Xi's work and edited two collections of major works of Song dynasty philosophy. He also published a work on river conservancy.

== See also ==
- Chen Pengnian
- Lu Longqi
