= Nanjing No.5 Middle School =

School in Nanjing, China

Nanjing No.5 Middle School was founded in 1945 in Nanjing, China. It is a national level demonstrative four star key high in Jiang Su. In 1953, it was identified as the first batch of Jiangsu Province, one of 14 provincial key middle schools.

== Alumni ==
The number of notable alumni has been mentioned in the media.

Alumni include:

- Qiao Dengjiang (academician and nuclear physicist),
- Chen Da (academician and nuclear physicist),
- Zhou Erfu (calligrapher),
- Yu Guangzhong (writer from Taiwan),
- Sha Yexin (playwright musician), Wu Zuqiang (composer)
- Yang Hongnian (conductor and educationist)
- Guo Jinlong (Beijing mayor)
- Wei Jianguo (vice minister of commerce)

== Faculty ==
The school operates an internal selection process. Nine special-grade teachers, one professional-special-grade teacher and six national outstanding teachers are chosen from the school faculty annually. Among the existing teachers, there are 57% senior teachers, and 38% for the academic leaders, city-known teachers and outstanding young teachers, 25% for graduates. There are a number of key teachers elected as the directors of Teaching Research and Exam Study, and 7 major Academic Teaching and Research awarded as the advanced Teaching and Research in Jiangsu Province. Staff are members of Proposition Group and Checking Group of the College Entrance Examination.

More detailed information of the Teaching Faculty in Nanjing No.5 Middle School.

== Strong teaching and researching atmosphere ==
Nanjing No.5 Middle School sticks to the idea of “Scientific teaching, qualified teaching”. “Center for Dialogue Project (Chinese:对话项目研究中心)” in Nanjing No.5 Middle School is the earliest researching center established in middle school in Nanjing City.The school has participated in more than 30 of the studies of the country Independently and 7 of the teaching & researching groups has been rewarded as the advanced groups in Jiangsu Province. And the numbers of the essaies publicly published by the school and rewarded in the province add up to several hundreds annually.

== Quality ==
Although Nanjing No.5 Middle School does not have secondary school, it still attracts a great number of students to its middle school for its outstanding teaching quality. Nearly 98% of students will enter university after college entrance examination. Some of the students even go to college by early admission.

== Facilities ==
Each faculty has a PC, and every classroom multimedia audio and video systems. The equipment includes Campus Computer Network, two-way closed circuit television systems. The school has a multi-functional lecture hall, a concert hall, a student room and some studio classrooms and an electronic reading room, and a newly renovated plastic track and field, basketball court, volleyball court, tennis courts and indoor sports facilities. The school has dormitories for one hundred students who live further afield.

== Location ==
Nanjing No.5 Middle School is located near Xinjiekou, with the subway station and more than a dozen bus lines. Address: 121st Tianfei Lane, Mochou Road, Nanjing, Zip Code: 210004.
