= Aihui District =

Aihui 爱辉区
- District
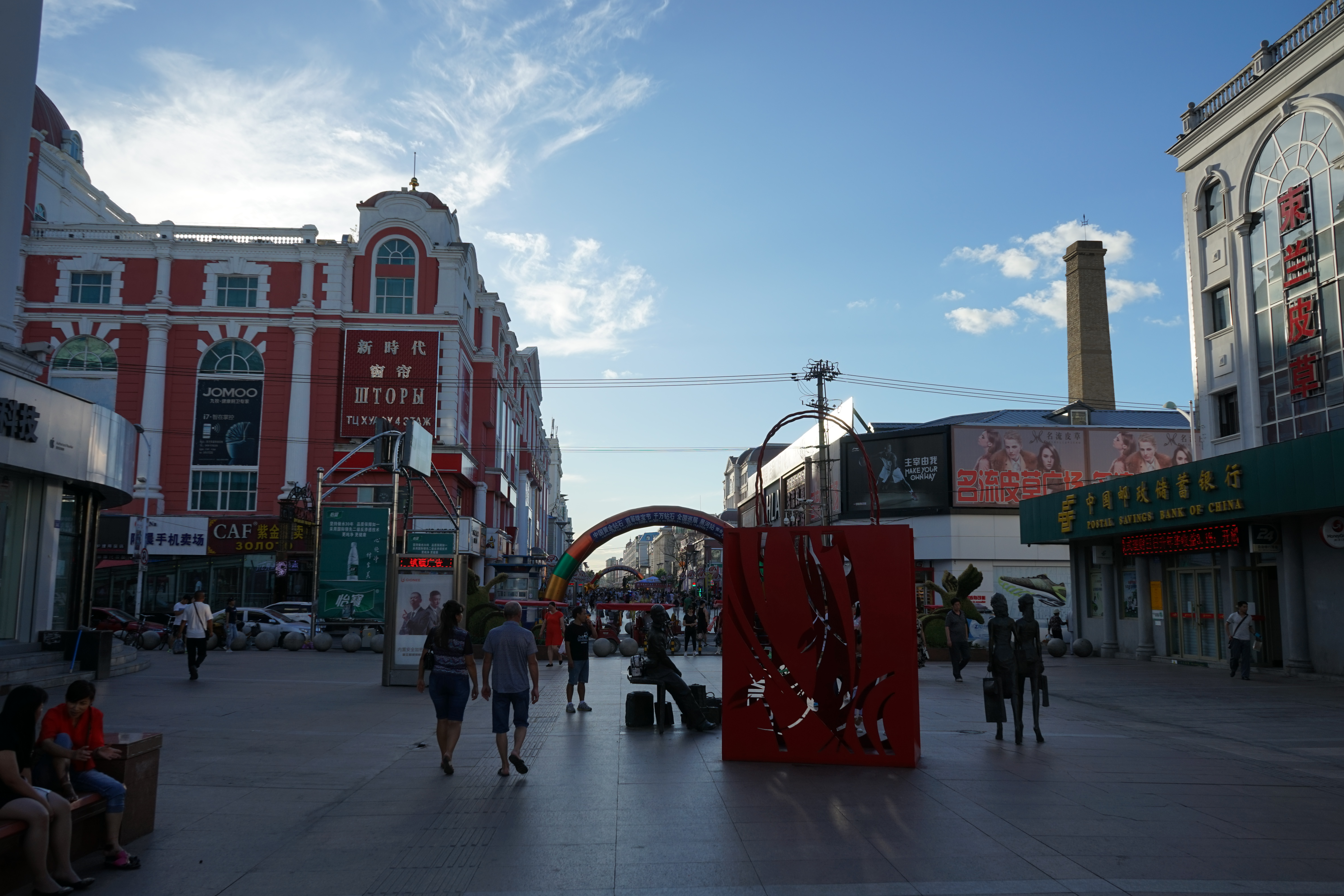

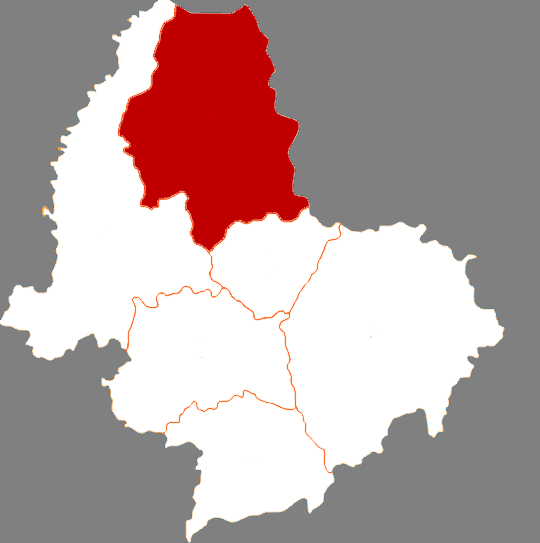
- Location of Aihui District within Heihe

- Location in Heilongjiang
- Coordinates: 50°14′28″N 127°29′36″E
- Country: China
- Province: Heilongjiang
- Prefecture-level city: Heihe
- Township-level divisions: 9 subdistricts; 8 towns; 1 township; 1 ethnic township
- District seat: Huayuan Subdistrict

Area
  - Total: 1,443 km^{2} (557 sq mi)
- Elevation: 134 m (440 ft)

Population (2020 census)
  - Total: 223,832
  - Density: 155.1/km^{2} (401.7/sq mi)
- Time zone: UTC+8 (China Standard)
- Postal code: 164300
- Area code: 0456
- Website: www.aihui.gov.cn

Aihui District (simplified Chinese: 爱辉区; traditional Chinese: 愛輝區; pinyin: Àihuī Qū) is an administrative district and the seat of the prefecture-level city of Heihe, Heilongjiang Province, China. It is located on the right (south-western) bank of the Amur River, across which is Blagoveshchensk, Amur Oblast, Russia. Aihui District spans an area of 1,443 km^{2} (557 sq mi), and had a population of 192,764 as of 2000.

== Names ==
Aihui has undergone a number of name changes throughout its history, including Aihui (simplified Chinese: 瑷珲; traditional Chinese: 璦琿; pinyin: Àihuī), Aihun (simplified Chinese: 艾浑; traditional Chinese: 艾渾; pinyin: Àihún), Aihu (simplified Chinese: 艾浒; traditional Chinese: 艾滸; pinyin: Àihǔ), and Aihu (simplified Chinese: 爱呼; traditional Chinese: 愛呼; pinyin: Àihū). Most recently, in 1956, the area's Chinese characters were changed from Aihui (simplified Chinese: 瑷珲; traditional Chinese: 璦琿; pinyin: Àihuī) to the present Aihui (simplified Chinese: 爱辉; traditional Chinese: 愛輝; pinyin: Àihuī), due to the uncommon nature of the former name's characters.

== History ==
The area of present-day Aihui has been occupied on and off by various Chinese dynasties dating back to the Tang dynasty.

=== Qing dynasty ===
To fend off Russian military forces invading the area, Qing dynasty forces were stationed in present-day Aihui in 1683.

In 1685, the city of Aihui (simplified Chinese: 瑷珲; traditional Chinese: 璦琿; pinyin: Àihuī) was built on orders from the Yamen of Heilongjiang. In the subsequent two centuries since its founding, Aihui served as one of the most important towns of Northern Manchuria.

Following the Boxer Rebellion the city was briefly occupied by Russia, until 1906 when it was returned to the Qing dynasty.

=== Republic of China ===
In 1913, Aihui incorporated as Aihui County (simplified Chinese: 瑷珲县; traditional Chinese: 璦琿縣; pinyin: Àihuī Xiàn).

From December 1934 to 1945, the city was ruled by the Japanese puppet-state of Manchukuo.

On December 11, 1956, was renamed Aihui County (simplified Chinese: 爱辉县; traditional Chinese: 愛輝縣, pronunciation unchanged). On November 15, 1980, Heihe City was created, and on June 6, 1983, Aihui County was abolished, being merged into the Heihe City.

To further complicate the situation, in 1993 the former Heihe City (a county-level administrative unit) was reorganized into Aihui District (also a county-level unit), while the former Heihe Prefecture (黑河地区) became Heihe Prefecture-level City (which consists of Aihui District and a number of counties). This administrative division has been in effect ever since.

== Geography ==
The Fabiela River and the Gongbiela River both run through the district. Much of the district is forested, particularly in the west. The primary trees of Aihui District are larch, red pine, poplar, and birch.

The district shares a 184.3-kilometre (114.5 mi) border with Russia, and faces the Russian city of Blagoveshchensk.

== Administrative divisions ==
Aihui is divided into 4 subdistricts, 3 towns, 5 townships, 3 ethnic townships, and 23 other township-level divisions.

The district's four subdistricts are Huayuan Subdistrict (花园街道), Xing'an Subdistrict (兴安街道), Hailan Subdistrict (海兰街道), and Xixing Subdistrict (西兴街道).

The district's three towns are Xigangzi (西岗子镇), Aihui (瑷珲镇), and Handaqi (罕达汽镇).

The district's five townships are Xingfu Township (幸福乡), Shangmachang Township (上马厂乡), Zhangdiyingzi Township (张地营子乡), Xifengshan Township (西峰山乡), and Erzhan Township (二站乡).

The district's three ethnic townships are Sijiazi Manchu Ethnic Township (四嘉子满族乡, Manchu: ᠰᡟ ᡥᡳᠶᠠ ᠰᡳ᠋ ᠮᠠᠨᠵᡠ ᡠᡴᠰᡠᡵᠠ ᡤᠠᡧᠠᠨ), Kunhe Daur and Manchu Ethnic Township (坤河达斡尔族满族乡, Manchu: ᡴᡡᠨ ᠪᡳᡵᠠ ᡩᠠᡥᡡᡵ ᠮᠠᠨᠵᡠ ᡠᡴᠰᡠᡵᠠ ᡤᠠᡧᠠᠨ), and Xinsheng Oroqen Ethnic Township (新生鄂伦春族乡).

The district also has 23 other township-level divisions, which include mines, farms, forestry areas, and other similar operations which have township-level status.

== Demographics ==
About 18,500 persons (9.4% of the entire population) belong to ethnic minorities. Aihui is home to 26 different ethnic groups, including Han Chinese, Manchu, Hui, Daur, Oroqen, Korean, and Mongol populations.

As of the 1990s, the village of Dawujia (Chinese: 大五家子屯), located in the district, remained one of the few pockets where the Manchu language was commonly spoken.

== Economy ==
The district is home to proven reserves of 69 different types of minerals. Proven coal reserves total 1.1 billion tons, proven gold reserves are 80 tons, proven silicon reserves are 1 million tons, and proven limestone reserves total 12 million tons. There are also sizable reserves of marble, basalt, perlite, and quartz sand.

== Transportation ==
National Highway 202 runs through the district, as does the Bei'an-Heihe railway.
