= Hu Huanyong =

Chinese demographer (1901–1998)

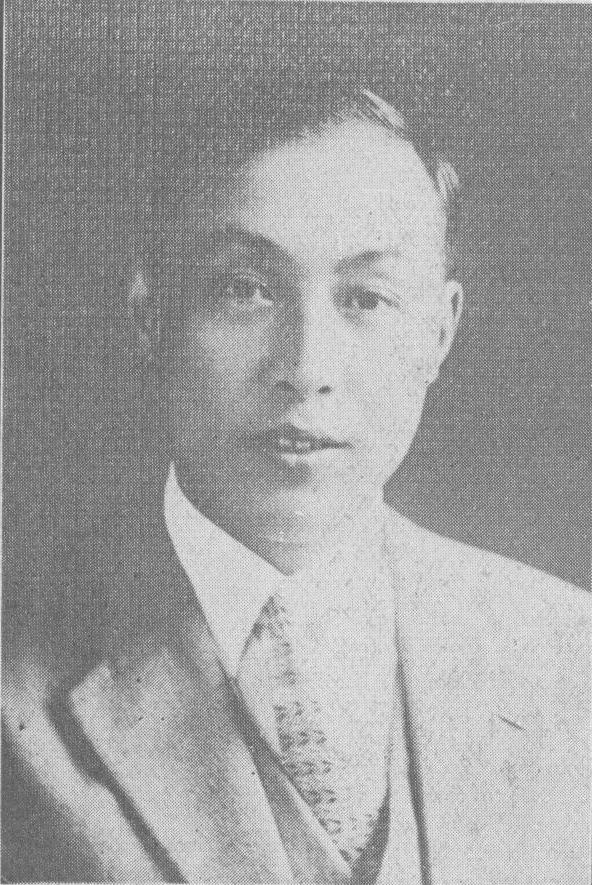
Hu Huanyong

Hu Huanyong (simplified Chinese: 胡焕庸; traditional Chinese: 胡煥庸, November 20, 1901 – April 30, 1998) was a Chinese demographer and the founder of China's population geography.

== Biography ==
He was born in Yixing, Jiangsu Province. He studied literature, history, and geography at Nanjing Higher Normal School. He continued his education at the University of Paris from 1926 to 1928. He returned to China and began teaching at National Central University where he was eventually appointed dean of the Department of Geography. He began teaching at East China Normal University (ECNU) in Shanghai in 1953, and in 1957 he became director of the research office of population geography at ECNU (which he helped to establish), the first demographic research institution in China.

In a paper published in 1934 entitled, "Distribution of China's Population," he drew the Heihe-Tengchong Line, also called the Aihun (or Aigun, ancient name of Heihe)-Tengchong Line, which is known internationally as the "Hu Line." The line marks a striking difference in the distribution of China's population.
