= Jean Dard =

Jean Dard (June 21, 1789 – October 1, 1833) was a French teacher in Saint-Louis, Senegal who, in 1817, opened the first French-language school in Africa. He also compiled the first French-Wolof dictionary and grammar (1846).

Dard developed a new approach for teaching French as a foreign language, the "mutual method" or méthode de traduction (translation method), based on a learning approach pioneered by Aloïsius Édouard Camille Gaultier, by which children were taught to read and write in their native Wolof and then learned French by translating. According to Jean-Benoît Nadeau and Julie Barlow, Dard's method was "very modern and very effective, and Dard was said to have achieved remarkable results with it."

In Senegal, Dard took a signare with whom he had a son. He then returned to France for reasons of health and married Charlotte-Adélaïde Picard—an eyewitness of the wreck of the Méduse—with whom he had three additional children. Dard served as a teacher and the town secretary in Bligny-lès-Beaune. The Dards returned to Senegal in 1832; however, he died there a year later.

== Biography ==
At the school he founded in Saint-Louis, Jean Dard practiced what was known at the time as “mutual instruction”, drawing in particular on the writings of Aloïsius Édouard Camille Gaultier(~1746–1818). One of the advantages of this teaching method is that it allows a single teacher to instruct a large number of students at once.
