= Cheng Li =

Chinese-American scholar

- 李成
- Born: Shanghai, China
- Other name: Li Cheng
- Education: East China Normal University (B.A.); University of California, Berkeley (M.A.); Princeton University (M.A., Ph.D.)
- Occupation: Scholar
- Known for: Analysis of leadership politics of the People's Republic of China

Cheng Li (Chinese: 李成; pinyin: Lǐ Chéng, born 1956) is a Chinese-American scholar specializing in Chinese elite politics and contemporary Chinese society; he served as the director of the John L. Thornton China Center at the Brookings Institution from 2014 to 2023, replacing Kenneth Lieberthal in the role. He is currently professor of political science and founding director of the Centre on Contemporary China and the World (CCCW) at the University of Hong Kong. Li is a prominent authority on Chinese politics, specifically leadership dynamics and the changes in leaders over generations.

== Early life and education ==
Li grew up in the city of Shanghai during the Cultural Revolution, and was at one point a barefoot doctor in his community. He graduated from East China Normal University with a B.A. in English literature. In 1985, he came to the United States for graduate studies at the University of California, Berkeley, where Li studied under Robert Scalapino, and was mentored by A. Doak Barnett. In 1987, He received an M.A. in Asian Studies there. He later received an M.A. (1989) and a Ph.D. (1992) in political science from Princeton University.

== Career ==
From 1993 to 1995, he worked in China as a fellow with the U.S.-based Institute of Current World Affairs, observing grassroots changes in his native country. Based on this experience, he published a nationally acclaimed book, Rediscovering China: Dynamics and Dilemmas of Reform (1997).

Li has written notably about the rise of "technocrats" in Chinese leadership circles. A portion of his research is informed by a large databank he had accumulated about Chinese leaders and their relations with one another.

Li has advised a wide range of government, business and non-profit organizations on working in China. He is a director of the National Committee on U.S.-China Relations, a member of the Academic Advisory Group of the Congressional U.S.-China Working Group, a member of the Council on Foreign Relations and a director of the Committee of 100. Before joining Brookings in 2006, he was the William R. Kenan professor of government at Hamilton College, where he had taught since 1991.

Li has been a recipient of fellowships or research grants from the Smith Richardson Foundation, the Freeman Foundation, the Peter Lewis Foundation, the Crane-Rogers Foundation, the Emerson Foundation, the United States Institute of Peace, Hong Kong Institute of Humanities and Social Sciences and the Chiang Ching-Kuo Foundation for International Scholarly Exchange. From 2002 to 2003, he was a residential fellow of the Woodrow Wilson International Center for Scholars.

He is frequently called on to share his unique perspective and insights as an expert on China. He has recently appeared on CNN, C-SPAN, BBC, ABC World News with Diane Sawyer, PBS NewsHour, Charlie Rose, Foreign Exchange with Fareed Zakaria and NPR's Diane Rehm Show. He has been featured in The New York Times, The Washington Post, The Wall Street Journal, Time magazine, The Economist, Newsweek, Business Week, Foreign Policy magazine and numerous other publications. Li is also a columnist for the Stanford University journal China Leadership Monitor. He is a regular speaker and participant at the Bilderberg Conference.

In the late 2010s, Li moved to Hong Kong. In a 2024 interview with the Financial Times, Li said he made this decision because the social and political environment in the United States had become more hostile to China scholars as relations between the two countries worsened and his views fell out of favor. Li questioned the US government's framing of the persecution of Uyghurs in China as a genocide.

== Affiliations ==
- 21st Century International Review, member, editorial board
- Asia Policy, member, editorial board
- China Leadership Monitor, Hoover Institution, Stanford University, columnist
- China's Rising Leaders Project, National Bureau of Asian Research, co-chair, advisory committee
- Committee of 100, member and co-chair, issue committee
- Council on Foreign Relations, member
- Institute of Current World Affairs, trustee
- Journal of Public Management, member, editorial board
- National Committee on United States-China Relations, member, board of directors
- The China Report, India, member, editorial board

== Publications ==
- Thornton Center Chinese Thinkers Series, principal editor (ongoing)
- Middle Class Shanghai Reshaping U.S.-China Engagement (2021)
- The Power of Ideas: The Rising Influence of Thinkers and Think Tanks in China (2017)
- Chinese Politics in the Xi Jinping Era: Reassessing Collective Leadership (2016)
- China's Political Development: Chinese and American Perspectives (2014, co-author)
- The Political Mapping of China’s Tobacco Industry and Anti-Smoking Campaign (2012)
- The Road to Zhongnanhai: High-Level Leadership Groups on the Eve of the 18th Party Congress (in Chinese, 2012)
- China's Emerging Middle Class: Beyond Economic Transformation (2010, ed.)
- China's Changing Political Landscape: Prospects for Democracy (2008)
- Bridging Minds Across the Pacific: The Sino-U.S. Educational Exchange 1978-2003 (2005)
- China's Leaders: The New Generation (2001)
- Rediscovering China: Dynamics and Dilemmas of Reform (1997)

== Bibliography ==
Li is also the author or the editor of numerous books, including

- China's Leaders: The New Generation (2001)
- Bridging Minds Across the Pacific: The Sino-U.S. Educational Exchange 1978-2003 (2005)
- China's Changing Political Landscape: Prospects for Democracy (2008)
- China's Emerging Middle Class: Beyond Economic Transformation (2010)
- The Road to Zhongnanhai: High-Level Leadership Groups on the Eve of the 18th Party Congress (in Chinese, 2012)
- The Political Mapping of China's Tobacco Industry and Anti-Smoking Campaign (2012)
- Chinese Politics in the Xi Jinping Era: Reassessing Collective Leadership (2016)
- The Power of Ideas: The Rising Influence of Thinkers and Think Tanks in China (2017)
- Middle Class Shanghai: Pioneering China's Global Integration (Manuscript)

He is the principal editor of the Thornton Center Chinese Thinkers Series published by the Brookings Institution Press.
