= David Binder (journalist) =

British–American journalist (1931–2019)

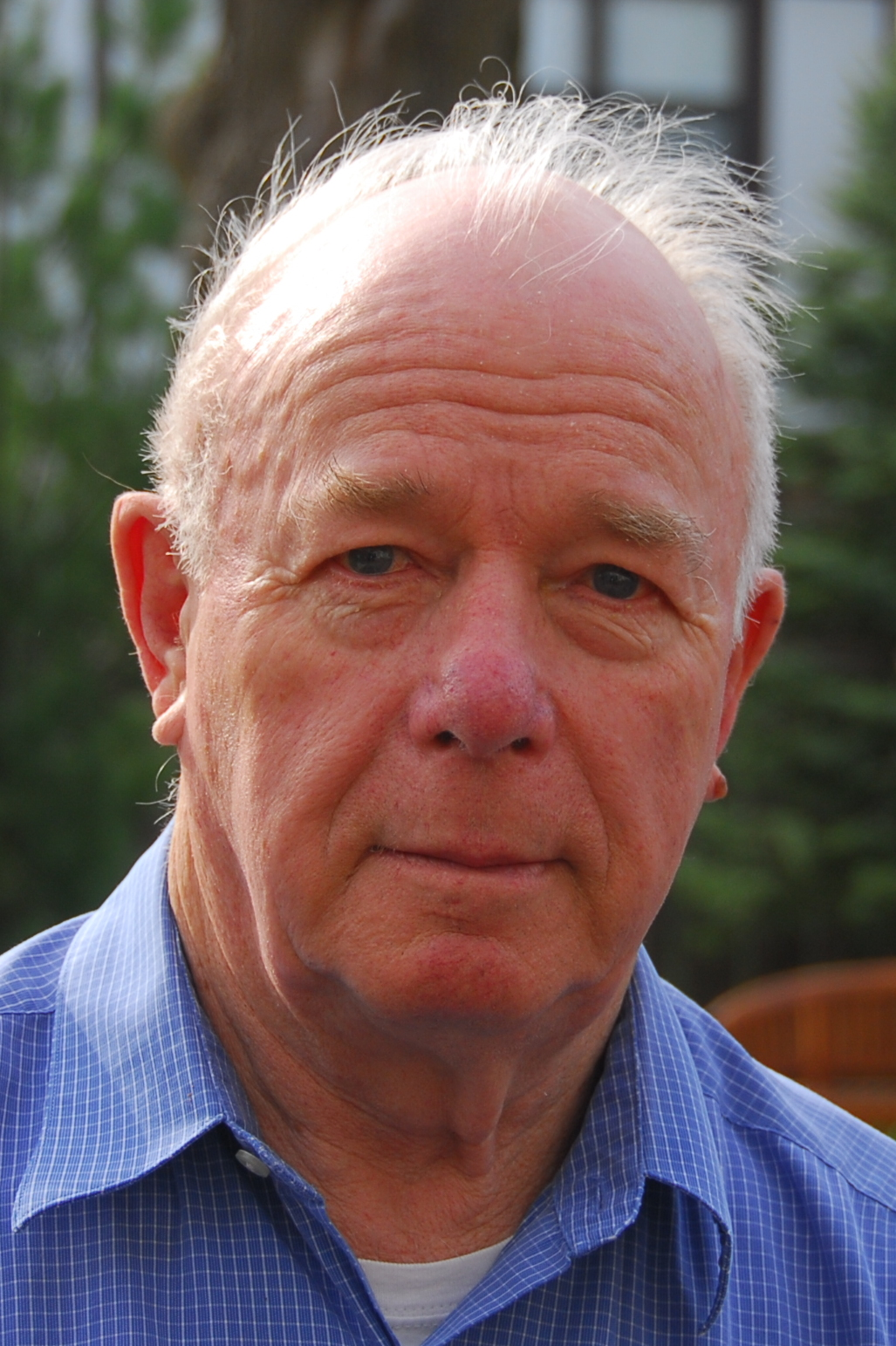
- Born: February 22, 1931; London, England, United Kingdom
- Died: June 30, 2019 (aged 88); Evanston, Illinois, United States
- Education: Harvard University, A.B.(cum laude), 1953; University of Cologne, Graduate study (Fulbright Scholar), 1953–1954
- Occupations: Journalist, author and lecturer
- Spouse: Dr. Helga Binder née Wagner (m. 1959)
- Children: 3
- Parents: Abner Carroll Binder (father); Dorothy Walton Binder (mother)

David Binder (February 22, 1931 – June 30, 2019) was a British-born American journalist, author and lecturer. He resided in Evanston, Illinois, after spending most of his adult life in Washington, D.C., Germany and Yugoslavia.

== Early childhood and education ==
Binder was born on February 22, 1931, in London, England, along with his twin sister Deborah, to American parents Abner Carroll Binder, an American journalist best known for contributions as a newspaper correspondent and editor for the Chicago Daily News and the Minneapolis Tribune, and Dorothy (Walton) Binder. He and his twin sister had two other siblings.

Binder was particularly close to his siblings, his twin sister Debbie, his older sister Mary "Sis" Kelsey and his older brother Carroll Jr., who was later killed in action over France during World War II. His brother's untimely death – the subject of the book One Crowded Hour: The Saga of An American Boy by Jenane (Patterson) Binder — was the source of considerable despair for his family and eventually led to his enrollment at a distant boarding school in Pennsylvania at the age of 13.

The Carroll Binder Nieman Fellowship at Harvard University is named after Binder's father, a 1916 Harvard graduate, and Binder's brother, also a 1943 Harvard graduate, and is part of the Nieman Fellowship program at Harvard that "allow[s] a group of accomplished journalists — half American, half international — to come to Harvard for a year of study on the subjects of their choice."

Born in London, Binder was raised in Highland Park, Illinois, a northern suburb of Chicago, until the age of 13, when he left home to attend George School, a Quaker boarding school in Pennsylvania. Following the academic path previously taken by his father and his older brother, he graduated from Harvard University in 1953, before attending the University of Cologne for graduate study on a Fulbright Scholarship. He worked as an assistant in American literature at the Salzburg Seminar in Austria in the summer of 1953.

== Personal life ==
Binder married Dr. Helga Binder, née Wagner, a German physician whom he had met in East Berlin during his stint in Germany and who went on to become a pediatric physician at Children's Hospital National Medical Center in Washington, D.C. Binder had three daughters and numerous grandchildren.

Upon their retirement, Binder and his wife moved from Chevy Chase, Maryland, to Evanston, Illinois, to be close to their youngest daughter (Dr. Alena Binder) and her family and his early childhood home in Highland Park, Illinois, where a memorial honoring his World War II veteran brother stands in the town center.

== Career ==
=== Early journalist years ===
Binder started his journalist career as a reporter and an editor for Carbondale Free Press-Southern-Illinoisan (1951), Louisville Times (1954–1956), Institute of Current World Affairs in Germany (1957–1959), Daily Mail in London (1959–1960) and Minneapolis Tribune (1960–1961). He also contributed to other publications including The Reporter, The Nation, The New Republic, Foreign Policy (published in Washington), Politika (a daily published in Belgrade), Vreme (a weekly published in Belgrade), Weltwoche (a Swiss weekly published in Zurich), der Spiegel (a German weekly published in Hamburg), Stern (a German magazine published in Hamburg), Neues Deutschland (a daily published in Berlin), Blaetter fuer deutsche und internationale Politik (published in Bonn), and The Wilson Quarterly (published in Washington). In 1970, he was elected president of the Verein der Ausländischen Presse (Foreign Press Association) of Germany.

=== The New York Times years ===
Binder was a journalist for The New York Times from 1961 to 2004, reporting on topics regarding Eastern and Western Europe, the Soviet Union, the United States, Cuba, Puerto Rico. He served as a foreign correspondent in 1961 in Berlin, where he reported on the building of the Berlin Wall. He was based in Belgrade from 1963 to 1966, in Bonn and later Berlin, Germany, from 1967 to 1973. During the latter period, he reported on the gradual rapprochement between East and West Germany, and on the Prague Spring of 1968. He then transferred to the Washington, D.C. bureau as a diplomatic correspondent, later serving as the bureau's assistant news editor, and again as a reporter.

Binder served on numerous occasions as a special correspondent for The New York Times, including reporting on the decline of the Soviet Bloc in 1987, the fall of the Berlin Wall in 1989, the collapse of the Warsaw Pact and the end of the Communist regimes in the German Democratic Republic, Romania, Albania and Yugoslavia in 1990–1992. In the 1990s, he traveled extensively in the Balkans to report on the wars that broke out in the aftermath of the dissolution of Yugoslavia (1990–1995) and the post-Communist regimes in Bulgaria and Romania. He also reported on the unification of West and East Germany. In 2000 and 2001, he went back to the Balkans to report on the burgeoning sex trade and drug smuggling in the region for MSNBC.

Early in his career, he also worked briefly as a science reporter for The New York Times, and then returned to the post more than three decades later to report on wildlife biology. In all, Binder published over 2,400 articles, books, book reviews and commentaries before retiring from The New York Times in 2004. David published original text in English and German, and was proficient in Serbo-Croatian, Greek and French.

During his tenure at The New York Times, Binder also published a number of lighthearted articles about his family, including those about the clumsiness of the men in his family and his road trip with his youngest daughter.

The New York Times' July 1, 2019, article by Robert D. McFadden on Binder's career, entitled "David Binder, 88, Dies; Chronicled the Cold War and Its Aftermath," stated that Binder was "[a] restless, relentless journalist [who] covered the Berlin Wall's construction in 1961 and its destruction in 1989 — bookends to his many hundreds of reports on East-West tensions and life under the Communist regimes in East Germany, Poland, Czechoslovakia, Hungary, Romania, Bulgaria and Yugoslavia."

=== Post-New York Times years ===
After his retirement from The New York Times, Binder continued to contribute to the newspaper with his researched and detailed obituaries of political or cultural figures including Egon Bahr, John Keegan, Rauf Denktash, Christa Wolf, Judith Coplon, Werner Eberlein, Spike Milligan, Hildegard Knef, Stefan Heym, Budd Boetticher and Ruth Werner. Binder was one of the contributors to The New York Times obituary of Zbigniew Brzezinski, a National Security Adviser for the Jimmy Carter administration, who died on May 26, 2017.

Binder gave lectures at Columbia University ("A Correspondent Reflects on Serbia 1963 – 1990"), the Wilson Center ("Combating Organized Crime in the Balkans"), the Serbian American Museum St. Sava and Indiana University and commented in articles published in various newspapers.

=== Television appearances ===
Binder also appeared on a number of televised news segments including CNN "Insight – The Macedonia Flashpoint", C-SPAN "Kosovo Liberation Army", C-SPAN "Situation in Kosovo", C-SPAN "Bosnia: How Did We Get There?", C-SPAN "U.S. Policy in the Balkans" and C-SPAN "Are the Western Media Combatants in Bosnia?"

=== Other publications and books ===
In 1989, Binder was appointed to the Editorial Advisory Board of the newly created Mediterranean Quarterly. In its first issue, he published an article entitled "The End of the Bloc", stating that the Soviet Union's Eastern European empire was "falling apart before our eyes".

In November 2013, his book Fare Well Illyria was published by the Central European University Press. Amazon.com described the book as "[a] comprehensive yet concise account of the cultural and political situation in the Balkans during the last three decades of the Cold War (1960–1990). Fare Well, Illyria sums up the author's thorough knowledge of the political and cultural history of the Balkans as well as his personal experience gained over four decades covering the region."

=== Northwoods of Wisconsin ===
Starting as an infant in 1931, Binder spent each summer of his early years with his parents and siblings at his family's cabin on Black Oak Lake in Land O' Lakes, Wisconsin where he developed his love for the wildlife, the people and the local cultures of the Northwoods of Wisconsin, the Great Lakes, Upper Peninsula of Michigan and fly fishing. He and his family continued to spend several weeks each summer at the family cabin, which he considered his spiritual home.

He wrote extensively about the Northwoods and Upper Peninsula Michigan in articles published by The New York Times. The topics of his articles included invasive species in the Great Lakes, wild bears of the Hiawatha National Forest of Michigan, moose in Michigan's Upper Peninsula, the Great Lakes Sturgeons, the Chippewa Indians of Vilas County, Wisconsin, the "Yoopers" of Upper Peninsula of Michigan, native birds of the Hiawatha National Forest and his ode to Land O' Lakes, Wisconsin, where generations of his family have spent their summers for nearly a hundred years.

=== Permanent collection and archive ===
Binder's collection of personal notes, memoirs, books, articles, photographs and other work from more than 60 years as a journalist will be housed and made available to the public at the Newberry Library of Chicago, "an independent research library dedicated to the advancement and dissemination of knowledge, especially in the humanities". The Newberry Library also houses the correspondence, writing, personal and family materials, and photographs of his father. Binder's 2415 articles and other publications through The New York Times have also been archived and are accessible via The New York Times' Collection of David Binder.

== List of publications ==
=== Books ===
- Berlin: East and West in Pictures, 1963 ISBN 978-0806910185
- The Other German: Willy Brandt's Life and Times. Washington D.C.: The New Republic Book Company. 1976. ISBN 978-0915220090.
- Children of a New Fatherland. Germany's Post-War Right-Wing Politics (Introduction), 1999 ISBN 978-1860644580
- Forward to "Media Cleansing, Dirty Reporting: Journalism and Tragedy in Yugoslavia," 2005 ISBN 978-1882383306
- Fare Well Illyria, 2013 ISBN 978-6155225741

=== Select articles ===
- "An Editorial" on the history of terrorism in Mediterranean Quarterly, Volume 12, Number 4, Fall 2001, pp. v–viii
- "General Draža Mihailovich - Unsung World War Two Hero"
- "Serbian Icons from Bosnia-Herzegovina: Sixteenth to Eighteenth Century (review)" in Mediterranean Quarterly, Volume 12, Number 4, Fall 2001, pp. 124–128
- "A Balkan Balance Sheet" in Mediterranean Quarterly, Volume 11, Number 1, Winter 2000, pp. 49–5
- "Vlachs, A Peaceful Balkan People" in Mediterranean Quarterly, Volume 15, Number 4, Fall 2004, pp. 115–124
- "Has 'Greater' Vanished from the Balkan Vocabulary? Fragmentation and Cohesion in Southeastern Europe" in Mediterranean Quarterly, Volume 20, Number 3, Summer 2009, pp. 40–50
- "The Time of Epithets" in Mediterranean Quarterly, Volume 19, Number 4, Fall 2008, pp. 81–90
- "Approaching Albania" in Mediterranean Quarterly, Volume 19, Number 1, Winter 2008, pp. 63–79
- "The Euro-Atlantic Brand" in Mediterranean Quarterly, Volume 21, Number 2, Spring 2010, pp. 12–17
- "The Waldheim Affair: Democracy Subverted (review)" in Mediterranean Quarterly, Volume 13, Number 1, Winter 2002, pp. 109–113
- "Greece, Turkey, and NATO" in Mediterranean Quarterly, Volume 23, Number 2, Spring 2012, pp. 95–106
- "Dangerous Citizens: The Greek Left and the Terror of the State (review)" in Mediterranean Quarterly, Volume 22, Number 1, Winter 2011, pp. 117–120
- "Carla Del Ponte: Madame Prosecutor" in Serbian Studies: Journal of the North American Society for Serbian Studies, Volume 21, Number 1, 2007, pp. 135–142
- "A Tribute to Nikolaos A. Stavrou 1935–2011" in Mediterranean Quarterly, Volume 23, Number 1, Winter 2012, pp. 1–4 with Lucien N. Nedzi, Matthew Nimetz, and Despina Skenderis-Fourniades
- "In the Middle of the Road" on the modern history of Serbia on April 12, 2008
- "Beyond the pale : perspectives from the two Serbias" in Mediterranean Quarterly, Volume 6, Number 2, Spring 1996, pp. 87–94
- "The Cowards of Kosovo", May 27, 2004
