= No.1 High School Affiliated to East China Normal University =

Coordinates: 31.267001°N 121.496546°E

- 华东师范大学第一附属中学

Location
- 上海市虹口区虹镇老街158号; 158 Hong Zhen Old Street, Hong Kou District; Shanghai; People's Republic of China

Information
- Type: Public
- Motto: 勤学好问、刻苦钻研、 一丝不苟、持之以恒
- Established: September 7, 1951
- Principal: 丁伟强; Ding Wei Qiang
- Enrollment: c. 2,000
- Campus: Urban
- Affiliations: East China Normal University
- Website: www.sdfz.sh.cn

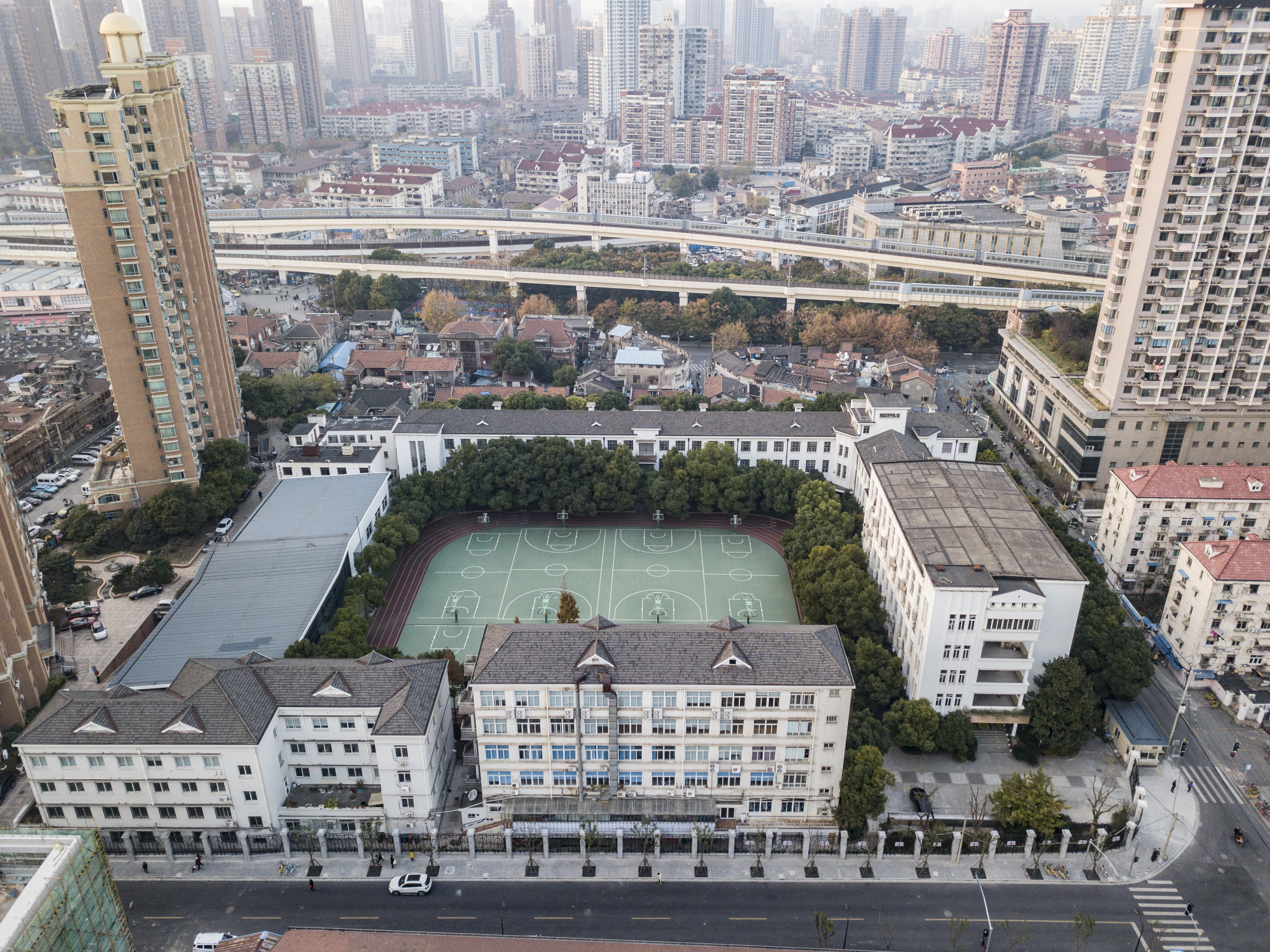

No.1 High School Affiliated to East China Normal University (华东师范大学第一附属中学) is a public secondary school in Shanghai, China.

== History ==
High School Affiliated to Kwang Hua University (光华大学附中), established on June 3, 1926 and High School Affiliated to the Great China University (大夏大学附中), established in Fall, 1925 merged to form High School Affiliated to East China Normal University on September 7, 1951.

== Sister school ==
The school has a sister school, No. 2 High School Attached to East China Normal University (华东师范大学第二附属中学).

== Alumni ==
- Zhou Youguang 周有光, a Chinese linguist graduated from Guanghua university
- Qiao Shi 乔石 a politician in the People's Republic of China, former Chairman of the Standing Committee of the National People's Congress
- Yao Yilin 姚依林 deputy Vice Premier of the State Council of the People's Republic of China from 1983 to 1988
- Wei Jianxing 尉健行 a politician in the People's Republic of China, former member of The Political Bureau of the Central Committee
- Xie Jin 谢晋 an important Chinese film director
- Zheng Kelu 郑克鲁, a professor and translator of French literature
