= Sixty Million Frenchmen Can't Be Wrong =

2003 book by Barlow and Nadeau

- Author: Julie Barlow, Jean-Benoît Nadeau
- Publication date: April 2003
- ISBN: 1-4022-0045-5

Sixty Million Frenchmen Can’t Be Wrong (Sourcebooks, 2003) is the first book from the writer-journalist team Julie Barlow and Jean-Benoît Nadeau.

== Conception ==
The idea for the book came from the couple’s two-year stay in Paris from 1999 to 2001. In 1999, Jean-Benoît Nadeau received a grant from the Institute of Current World Affairs to study the French. The topic of study was: Why the French resist globalization. Two weeks after arriving in France the authors realized that the French were not resisting globalization at all. Jean-Benoît Nadeau wrote long reports to the foundation of his observations about France. Julie Barlow wrote a number of reports for the same institute.

Sixty Million Frenchmen Can’t Be Wrong answers the question that the authors struggled with during their two years in France: why do the French get so much flak for resisting globalization when they aren’t resisting it any more than other countries, including the United States?

== The book ==
Sixty Million Frenchmen Can't Be Wrong is divided into three parts.

Part 1, Spirit, has eight chapters that explain the main features of the French mindset, including history and geography, their ideas about privacy, their culture of grandeur and eloquence and extremism and the impact of major events like World War II and French decolonization.

Part 2, Structure, explains how the French created political and social structures in accordance with their values, but also to correct some obvious problems in their society. The first chapter explains how the French created a politically balanced democracy by putting in place a president "monarch" who enjoys more power than heads of state in any modern democracy. The other 10 chapters explain the value the French place on equality and the principle of assimilation, and how they have struggled to create a unified French national identity from the hodge-podge of extremely diverse cultures.

Part 3, Change, explains in four chapters how France is evolving in terms of its worldview, demography and political institutions, both because of internal forces and the influence of the European Union.

== Publication ==
The book was published in April 2003, in the middle of the Iraq War. The French had refused to endorse the US invasion of Iraq, which happened without UN's approval, triggering an intense wave of anti-French sentiment, which culminated in the call to rebrand French fries, "freedom fries."

The British edition was published by Robson Books in April 2004 during the centennial of the Entente Cordiale between France and the United Kingdom and the book appeared in Dutch at the same time. In 2004, Jean-Benoît Nadeau adapted and updated the book before translating it. The French edition was published by Seuil with the title Pas si fous, ces Français! Two Mandarin editions appeared in 2004 and 2005, one in simplified, and the other in traditional Mandarin.

== Trivia ==
The title for the book, chosen in 2001, was inspired by Cole Porter’s title song for his musical Fifty Million Frenchmen. It is a good summary of the authors’ intent of explaining the French in their own terms.

The first print (2000 copies) of the American edition of Sixty Million Frenchmen Can’t Be Wrong features an upside down French flag with the red color near the flagpole. This mistake was corrected in the subsequent prints, but copies of the book with the upside-down flag still circulate.

== Other books ==
Jean-Benoît Nadeau also wrote about their first two-year stay in Paris in a separate humorous travelogue titled Les Français aussi ont un accent (The French Also Have an Accent), published by French publisher Payot.

In 2013–2014, the authors spent a year in France researching a new book on the French, The Bonjour Effect: The Secret Codes of French Conversation Revealed (St. Martin's Press, 2016). This new book is not an update of Sixty Million Frenchmen Can't Be Wrong, but it uses a similar approach to analyze and describe the way the French talk – about small things and big issues, themselves and the world around them, including their own taboos.

Sixty Million Frenchmen Can't Be Wrong inspired the authors' second book, The Story of French, (St. Martin’s Press, Knopf Canada and Anova-Robson Books, 2006), a history of French language as it's spoken across the planet. There are two versions of the book in French, one published in Quebec in 2007 with the title La Grande Aventure de la langue française. In 2011, Jean-Benoît Nadeau completely rewrote and adapted the original English version for a French edition published in Paris, Le français, quelle histoire! (Télémaque and Le Livre de Poche).

In 2013, the couple also published The Story of Spanish (St. Martin's Press), which was inspired by The Story of French.
