= Carl Marcy =

American Congress official (1913-1990)

Carl Marcy (1913–1990) was the former Chief of Staff of the United States Senate Foreign Relations Committee.

Marcy was born in Oregon. He graduated from Willamette University, then completed a degree in law from Columbia University and a doctorate in Columbia University in international law and relations.

He received a Rockefeller Public Service Award in 1963, and with his wife Mildred Kester Marcy received a Joint Fellowship from the Institute of Current World Affairs, which allowed them to travel and live abroad for two years to research US foreign policy concerns.
