= Dai Houying =

Chinese novelist

Dai Houying (Chinese: 戴厚英; March 1938 – 25 August 1996) was a Chinese woman novelist, and one of the first Chinese writers to criticize the devastating decade-long Cultural Revolution.

== Stones in the Wall (人啊人) ==
Her best known work is Stones in the Wall (人啊人|People, Oh People). "The novel [Stones of the Wall], published in 1980, was one of the first literary works to confront the excesses of the Chinese Cultural Revolution."

An early edition describes the book as "The First Major Novel to Come Out of Contemporary China. Written by a former Red Guard and set mostly in Shanghai in the late 1970s, this is a novel of how the Cultural Revolution of 1967 and the fall of the Gang of Four in 1977 affected one woman, her husband and their friends."

The book tells the story of intellectuals named Zhao Zhenhuan, Sun Yue and He Jingfu in the Cultural Revolution, a period Dai personally experienced as a persecutor—a red guard.

== Biography ==
Dai received her bachelor's degree of Chinese literature from East China Normal University in 1960. She worked as a literary critic based in Shanghai until 1969 when she was accused of being a rightist during the Anti-Rightist Campaign.

Dai divorced her Red Guard husband in the spring of 1970 and that same year fell in love with the poet Wen Jie (闻捷) while they both were working in the countryside. They applied to get married but it was not approved. They were both criticized for their love. Unapologetic, Wen received even more intense criticism. Unable to continue without her, he killed himself in January 1971. Dai's novel Death of a Poet reflects this experience.

Dai began writing novels in 1978. She wrote a famous trilogy about the fate of intellectuals in the Chinese Cultural Revolution. These works were Death of a Poet, Stones in the Wall, and Footsteps in the Void.

Her 1980 novel Stones in the Wall was a huge success selling over a half million copies.

Dai's work includes a wide range of essays, short stories, and novellas.

Dai advocated for Marxist humanism.

Dai taught literature at China's Fudan University in Shanghai.

She was killed in August 1996 when an intruder killed her and her niece.

== Works ==
- Death of a Poet "诗人之死" Completed in 1978, Dai's opponents in Shanghai blocked publication.
- Stones in the Wall "人啊人" Completed in 1980 after a South China publisher, far from Shanghai, offered to publish her first book. She submitted her second book and it was published November 1980. [English edition published by St Martins Press; First Edition (April 1, 1986) Translated by Frances Wood.]
- Footsteps in the Void "空中的足音" 1986

== Derivative works ==
- The Yangtze Repertory Theater presented the first stage adaptation of Ren Ah, Ren (You, O You Humans), the novel by Dai HouYing. It was adapted for the stage and directed by Joanna Chan in New York city in 2005.
