= Tong Shijun =

Chinese philosopher and chancellor

- 童世骏

2nd Chancellor of New York University Shanghai
- Incumbent
- Assumed office June 1, 2020
- Preceded by: Yu Lizhong

Personal details
- Born: September 14, 1958 (age 67) Hangzhou, Zhejiang, China

Tong Shijun (Chinese: 童世骏; born September 14, 1958) is a Chinese philosopher and Chancellor of New York University Shanghai. From 2011 to 2019, Tong served as professor of philosophy and party secretary at East China Normal University (ECNU), where he also held several positions in the philosophy faculty and university administration from 1984 to 2004. He served as a researcher and Deputy Party Secretary at the Shanghai Academy of Social Sciences from 2004 to 2011.

== Early life and education ==
Tong spent the first six years of his life in a village of Xiaoshan District, Hangzhou City, Zhejiang Province before moving to Shanghai, where he went to elementary and middle school. In 1975, Tong was dispatched to work on a farm on Chongming Island. When the Chinese National College Entrance Examination resumed in late 1977 following the Cultural Revolution, Tong gained entry to ECNU to study philosophy.

He received both his bachelor's degree and master's degree from ECNU in 1982 and 1984 respectively. In 1988, Tong traveled to the University of Bergen in Norway as a visiting scholar. He ultimately earned a PhD in philosophy from the university in 1994, studying under Norwegian philosopher Gunnar Skirbekk.

== Career and Scholarship ==
Tong began teaching in ECNU's Philosophy Department as a lecturer in 1984, becoming associate professor in 1991 and full professor in 1994. After graduating from the University of Bergen, Tong served as the chair of the philosophy department at ECNU from 1995 to 1998 and was appointed deputy dean of the School of Humanities from 1997 to 2000. In 2000, Tong spent a year at Columbia University as a Fulbright Scholar.

Tong joined the Shanghai Academy of Social Sciences (SASS) in 2004 as a researcher and as deputy party secretary, becoming the director of the academy's Institute of Philosophy from 2009 to 2011. In 2011, Tong returned to ECNU as professor of philosophy and secretary of the university's Communist Party Standing Committee

Tong is the author of 10 original books on philosophy, including his most recent work, 当代中国的精神挑战 [Spiritual Challenges in China Today] (2017). Tong's scholarship focuses primarily on philosophic paths for dialogue between China and the West and philosophy's application to contemporary society. Much of Tong's work relates to the concept of communicative rationality introduced by Jurgen Habermas, whose 1992 work Between Facts and Norms: Contributions to a Discourse Theory of Law and Democracy was translated into Chinese by Tong. Tong is also the author (with Li Guangcheng) of the Chinese translation of Hilary Putnam's Reason, Truth, and History.

Tong continues to serve as director of ECNU’s National Institutes of Educational Policy Research. He is a foreign member of the Norwegian Academy of Science and Letters and member of the board of consulting editors for the journal Philosophy and Social Criticism. He has also served as an advisory member of the Shanghai Ministry of Education and of the Shanghai Municipal Chinese People's Political Consultative Conference (CPPCC).
