= The Story of Spanish =

2013 book by Jean-Benoît Nadeau

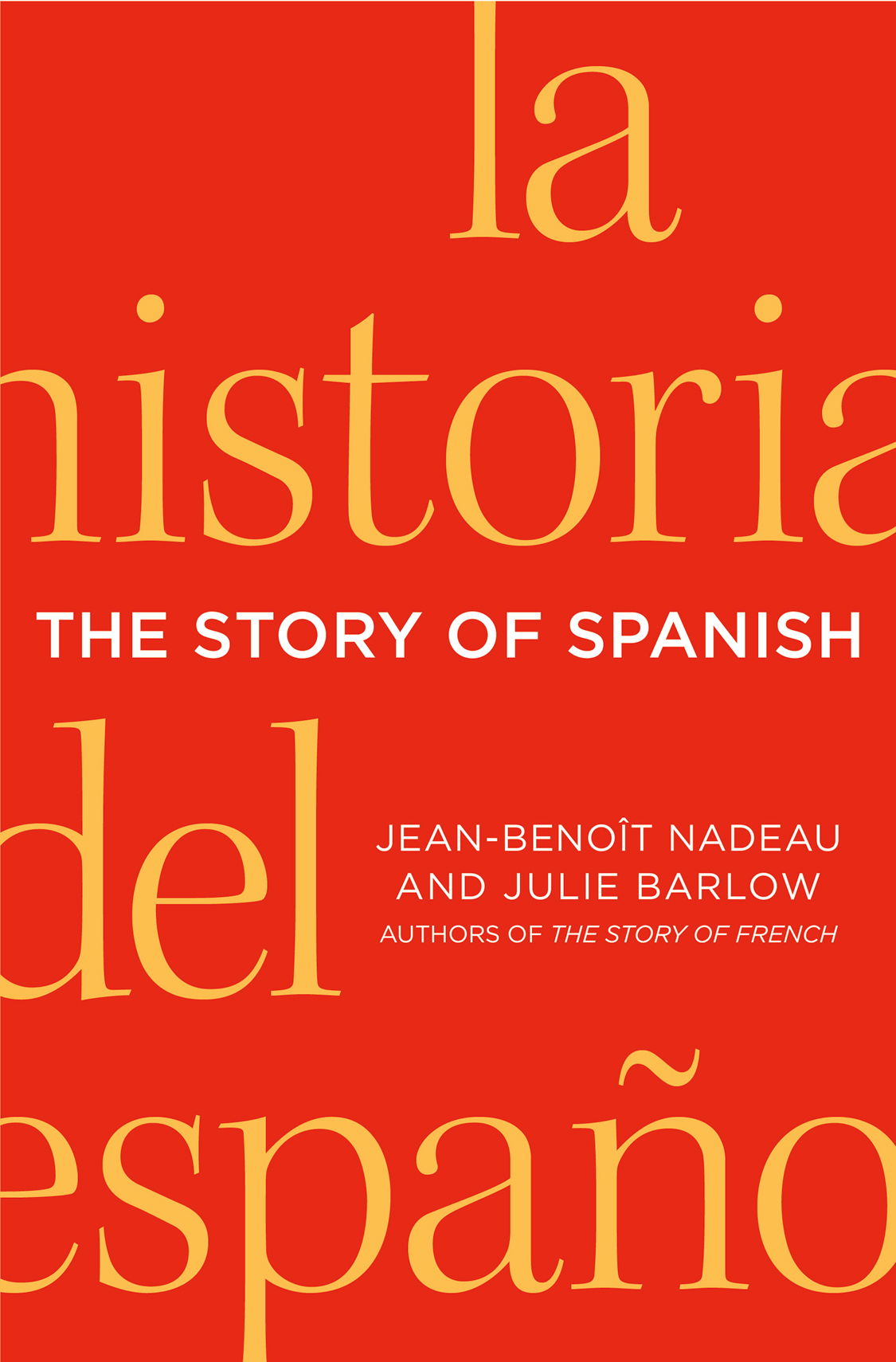
- Author: Jean-Benoît Nadeau; Julie Barlow
- Language: English
- Subject: Spanish language
- Genre: Non-fiction
- Publisher: St. Martin's Press
- Publication date: May 7, 2013
- Pages: 496

The Story of Spanish is a non-fiction book written by Jean-Benoît Nadeau and Julie Barlow that charts the origins of the Spanish language. The 496-page book published by St. Martin’s Press (May 7, 2013), explains how the Spanish language evolved from a tongue spoken by a remote tribe of farmers in northern Spain to become one of the world’s most spoken languages.

The Story of Spanish is described as a “veritable biography of the Spanish language.” The book begins by explaining where the term España (Spain) originated. Around 1200 BC when the Phoenicians landed on the Iberian Peninsula the land was riddled with furry creatures with long ears called hyraxes (rabbits). The Phoenicians named the territory the land of hyraxes: I-shepan-ha, which was later Latinized by the Romans to Hispania, to finally transform into España centuries later.

From there, Nadeau and Barlow trace the Spanish language from its evolution from Vulgar Latin all the way to its entrance to the New World (North America).

The Story of Spanish breaks down major events and points out the major players in history that had a direct impact on the course of the Spanish language. For example, Nadeau and Barlow explain how the Castilian King Alfonso X improved the reputation of the language and was the first to recognize that “vernacular languages needed rules.”

And how Arabic heavily influenced Spanish during Spain’s centuries under Muslim rule. Numerous Spanish words, including words like aceite (olive oil), azul (blue) and azúcar (sugar) come from Arabic.

And how when the Spanish explored the New World they lacked the words to describe all the new things they encountered and adopted many terms from native languages such aguacate (avocado) and xitomatl that became tomate (tomato).

The book ends by demonstrating just how much Spanish has spread to become the third most spoken language in the world with over five hundred million speakers and why there is an increasing number of people learning Spanish as a second language.) For example, in France there are 2.1 million people learning Spanish, mainly because the French travel to Spain a lot, and the French education system requires students to learn two foreign languages and Spanish is perceived as “easy.”

The Story of Spanish signifies that Spanish is much more than tacos, flamenco, and bullfighting. It makes clear that how American cultural artifacts and customs are fundamentally Spanish including the dollar sign, barbecues, ranching, and cowboy culture.

The authors of The Story of Spanish ends the book by describing why they believe Spanish will continue to be a dominant international language. They write, “The Spanish language is unquestionably one of the great unifying forces of the Hispanic world.”
