= Jason Jiang =

Chinese businessman

Jiang Nanchun
- Born: 1973 (age 52–53); Shanghai, China
- Other name: Jason Jiang
- Education: East China Normal University; Cheung Kong Graduate School of Business
- Occupation: businessman
- Title: Focus Media (Founder & CEO); Everease Advertising Corporation (CEO, 1994-2003) of Aiqi Advertising (General Manager, 2003)

Jiang Nanchun (Chinese: 江南春; born 1973), also known as Jason Jiang, is a Chinese businessman. He is the founder and CEO of Focus Media, "a multi-platform digital media company that operates out-of-home advertising network using audiovisual digital displays". In 2005 his company went public on the Nasdaq Stock Exchange, and achieved a market capitalization of US$3.6 billion as of 2011. He delisted the company from Nasdaq in 2013, and used a reverse takeover to list the company in China in 2016. In 2018, Forbes estimated his net worth at US$5.4 billion.

== Career ==
Jiang graduated with a degree in Chinese language and literature from East China Normal University in 1995. Between 1994 and 2003, Jiang was the CEO of Everease Advertising Corporation, a top 50 advertising agency in China. In 2003 Jiang became general manager of Aiqi Advertising, which was then renamed Focus Media Advertising in the same year, of which he became chairman and CEO. Jiang was chosen by the Television and Newspaper Committees of the China Advertising Commission as "contemporary outstanding advertising media personalities" in September 2003. He is an alumnus of the Cheung Kong Graduate School of Business.
