= Jean-Benoît Nadeau =

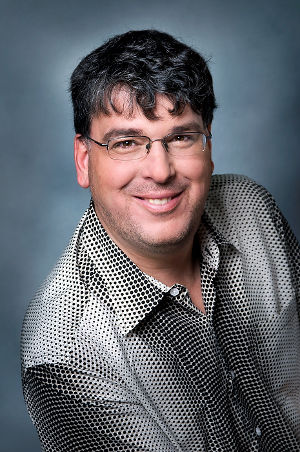
Jean-Benoît Nadeau

Jean-Benoît Nadeau (born in 1964) is a Canadian author, journalist, and lecturer, and a Fellow of the Institute of Current World Affairs.

He is the author of The Bonjour Effect and Sixty Million Frenchmen Can't Be Wrong which he co-wrote with his wife, Julie Barlow.

== Biography ==
Born in Sherbrooke, Quebec, Jean-Benoît Nadeau received a bachelor's degree from McGill University in 1992 where he majored in Political Science and History.

He began his journalism career in 1987, as a theatre critic for the Montreal cultural weekly Voir. He is best known as a regular contributor to Canada's national French-language magazine L’actualité. Since September 2014, he also writes a column for the French language Montreal daily Le Devoir.

In all, he has published more than 1000 feature stories and columns.

In 1993, he began writing in English for English Canadian magazines like Saturday Night, Profit, and Report on Business Magazine.

Over the years, his byline has appeared in articles (mostly op-ed pieces), in USA Today, The New York Times, The Christian Science Monitor, The Toronto Star and The Wall Street Journal.

In 1999, Nadeau was granted a two-year fellowship from the Institute of Current World Affairs to travel to France and study the reasons why the French were resisting globalization.

In 2003, he began to co-author books with his wife, Julie Barlow. The first was Sixty Million Frenchmen Can’t Be Wrong, a book about the French people and their culture. Published by Sourcebooks, it was translated into French (Pas si fous, ces Français!), Dutch and Chinese. There are two different Chinese translated editions--one in traditional Chinese, and the other in simplified Chinese.

In 2006, Nadeau and Barlow wrote The Story of French, a history of the French language from its origins to its present evolution, published by St. Martin's Press. This book was translated into Japanese. In French, it exists in two different versions. It appeared in Quebec in 2007 under the title La Grande aventure de la langue française, and in France in 2011 under the title Le français, quelle histoire! The latter is an updated, second edition of the book.

This book was adapted into a two-hour radio documentary, Le français n’a pas dit son dernier mot (French Language Has Not Said Its last Word), broadcast by France Culture in July 2014.

In 2010, Nadeau and his family spent six months in Phoenix, Arizona, to conduct research on his next book, The Story of Spanish. Written by Jean-Benoît Nadeau and Julie Barlow, The Story of Spanish is a book about the history of the Spanish language and is similar to The Story of French. It was published by St. Martin's Press.

In 2013-2014, Nadeau and his family spent a year in Paris to research a new book on the French, The Bonjour Effect: The Secret Codes of French Conversation Revealed with coauthor Julie Barlow, published by St. Martin's Press in 2016.

== Works in French ==
Jean-Benoît Nadeau also wrote, individually, a number of books in French, which have never been translated.

In 2002, Nadeau wrote Les Français aussi ont un accent ("The French Also Have an Accent;" available only in French) a quirky travelog on the experience of living in France. It was published by the French publishing house Editions Payot.

In 2007, Jean-Benoît Nadeau published a second edition of his book Guide du travailleur autonome ("Guide for the Self-Employed") as well as Écrire pour vivre ("Live to Write"), a practical guidebook on how to make a living from writing. The books were published by Québec Amérique.

In 2014, he published Les accents circomplexes ("The Circomplex Accents")—part essay, part memoir, of his culture shock upon returning to Canada, first to Toronto and then to Montreal. It was published by Stanké, an imprint of Groupe Librex.

Also in 2014, he published Le Guide du travailleur autonome 3.0 ("Guide for the Self-Employed"), the third edition of a partly autobiographical book of advice to those who are self-employed. A second edition of this book had been published in 2007.

== Awards ==
2011 L’Académie des Science d’Outre-Mer (The Academy of Overseas Sciences) Prix de la Renaissance Française (French Renaissance Award)

2007 Quebec Writer's Federation Mavis Gallant Prize for Non-Fiction

As a journalist, he also won two dozen different awards, mostly in Quebec and Canada.

== Published works ==
- 2003: Sixty Million Frenchmen Can't Be Wrong (Sourcebooks)
- 2006: The Story of French (St. Martin's Press)
- 2013: The Story of Spanish (St. Martin's Press)
- 2016: The Bonjour Effect: The Secret Codes of French Conversation Revealed (St. Martin's Press)

In French only:

- 2002: Les Français aussi ont un accent (Payot)
- 2007: Écrire pour vivre (Québec Amérique)
- 2014: Les Accents circomplexes (Stanké)
- 2014: Le Guide du travailleur autonome 3.0, third edition (Québec Amérique)
