= Charlotte-Adélaïde Dard =

French writer

- Born: 14 September 1798; Paris, France
- Died: 2 November 1862 (aged 64); Saint-Louis, Senegal
- Spouse: Jean Dard
- Writing career
- Genre: autobiography
- Notable work: La Chaumière africaine ou Histoire d'une famille française jetée sur la côte occidentale de l'Afrique à la suite du naufrage de la frégate La Méduse

Charlotte-Adélaïde Dard (14 September 1798 – 2 November 1862) was a French writer best known for La Chaumière africaine ou Histoire d'une famille française jetée sur la côte occidentale de l'Afrique à la suite du naufrage de la frégate La Méduse, an autobiographical account of events following a shipwreck off the west coast of Africa.

== Biography ==
The daughter of Charles Picard, an infantry captain, she was born Charlotte-Adélaïde Picard in Paris. She travelled with her family to Senegal on the frigate Méduse in 1816 one year after England returned control of the country to France. Due to errors by the ship's captain, Méduse was wrecked off the coast of Mauritania. The family was able to escape the sinking frigate in a lifeboat which eventually reached the coast and, after walking for several days, they reached Saint-Louis. Her father lost his French civil service position in Senegal and the family was forced to support itself by growing food and harvesting cotton on a plantation that her father had purchased.

In 1820, she married Jean Dard, a teacher who had taken responsibility for the Picard children following their father's death. The couple moved to Bligny-lès-Beaune in France where her husband had been hired as a teacher and secretary for the town. Dard published her account of the events surrounding the shipwreck in 1824; an English translation was published in 1827. The couple returned to Senegal in 1832.

Dard died in Saint-Louis at the age of 64.
