= Yangtze Delta Universities Alliance =

Inter-university conference in eastern China

- 长三角高校合作联盟
- Formation: 2005; 21 years ago
- Members: 8 universities

Chinese name
- Simplified Chinese: 长三角高校合作联盟
- Traditional Chinese: 長三角高校合作聯盟
Transcriptions
Standard Mandarin
- Hanyu Pinyin: Zhǎngsānjiǎo Gāoxiào Hézuò Liánméng

Yangtze Delta Universities Alliance (Chinese: 长三角高校合作联盟) is an inter-university conference of eight public universities in East China. It was established in 2005.

== List of participating universities ==
University	Location	Year founded	Note
Fudan University	Shanghai	1905	Project 211, Project 985, Double First-Class Construction, C9 League
East China Normal University	Shanghai	1951	Project 211, Project 985, Double First-Class Construction
Nanjing University	Nanjing, Jiangsu	1902	Project 211, Project 985, Double First-Class Construction, C9 League
Shanghai Jiao Tong University	Shanghai	1896	Project 211, Project 985, Double First-Class Construction, C9 League
Southeast University	Nanjing, Jiangsu	1902	Project 211, Project 985, Double First-Class Construction, Excellence League
University of Science and Technology of China	Hefei, Anhui	1958	Project 211, Project 985, Double First-Class Construction, C9 League
Tongji University	Shanghai	1907	Project 211, Project 985, Double First-Class Construction, Excellence League
Zhejiang University	Hangzhou, Zhejiang	1897	Project 211, Project 985, Double First-Class Construction, C9 League
