= Michele Geraci =

Italian economist and politician (born 1967)

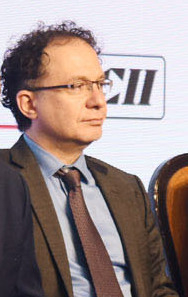
- Geraci in 2018

Undersecretary of State of Economic Development
- In office 13 June 2018 – 5 September 2019
- Prime Minister: Giuseppe Conte
- Preceded by: Antonio Gentile; Antonello Giacomelli; Ivan Scalfarotto
- Succeeded by: Alessia Morani; Alessandra Todde; Mirella Liuzzi; Gian Paolo Manzella

Personal details
- Born: 1967 (age 58–59) Palermo, Sicily, Italy
- Education: University of Palermo; Massachusetts Institute of Technology (MBA)
- Occupation: Politician; economist; professor
- Known for: Role in Italy's participation in the Belt and Road Initiative
- Awards: Knight of the Order of Merit of the Italian Republic (2015)
- Website: michelegeraci.com

Michele Geraci (born 1967) is an Italian politician and economist who focuses on policy-oriented research on international trade, EU-China relations, AI, universal basic income and other current affairs. He served as the Undersecretary of State at the Italian Ministry of Economic Development, responsible for foreign trade and foreign direct investments in the First Conte government.

== Early life and education ==
Michele Geraci was born in 1967 in Palermo, Sicily, Italy. He graduated with honours in electronic engineering from the University of Palermo, and in 1991 started his career as an electronic engineer at British Telecom, a member of the Satellite Planning unit. He then obtained, in 1996, a Master’s in Business Administration from the Sloan School of Management of the Massachusetts Institute of Technology in Boston.

== Early career ==
After completing his studies, he began his career as an investment banker, working for 12 years in various banks and business firms between New York and London, such as Merrill Lynch, Bank of America, Donaldson, Lufkin & Jenrette, and Schroders. Prior to his current roles, he also worked as an engineer in London at British Telecom.

In 2008, he moved to China, where he taught finance at two universities, the University of Nottingham Ningbo China and New York University Shanghai, as well as held a number of short-term appointments at Zhejiang University (Hangzhou) and Southwestern University of Finance and Economics (Chengdu).

Geraci's research work has focused on the impact of macroeconomic policies on the development of society, with a particular focus on the impact of these policies on the weakest segments of the population. He has always held a cautious view on market liberalism, considering it, on the one hand, useful for the development of economies, but also the cause of serious income inequalities and other redistributive effects of wealth.

To better analyse the socio-economic conditions of low-income groups, he conducted a study on microcredit in China, published by the Global Policy Institute in London, and produced a documentary on the conditions of peasants in China, touching on topics such as agrarian reform and migration to urban centres. His interest in social issues, typically of the historical left-wing tradition, is also present in his proposal to introduce in Italy an advanced form of Universal Basic Income, conceived as a response to stem those negative effects of globalization.

== Political career ==
Close to the Lega, he collaborated with Matteo Salvini and participated in some party initiatives, proposing the Chinese economy as a model for Italy. He also theorized the compatibility between the Universal Basic Income proposed by the Five Star Movement (the so-called Reddito di cittadinanza, actually, technically, a guaranteed minimum income) and the flat tax proposed by the League, supporting, after the 2018 political elections, the possibility of an alliance between the two parties, as it then did turn out to be the case. He was therefore appointed Undersecretary of State in the Ministry of Economic Development in the first Conte cabinet, supported by a coalition between M5S and Lega, from 2018 to 2019.

During the experience of the M5S–Lega coalition government, Geraci was the main architect of the signing of the memorandum of Italy's accession to the "New Silk Road", the geo-economic project of infrastructural and commercial connectivity with Chinese traction initially contested by the European Union and by the United States, but supported by President Mattarella. Geraci was one of the main negotiators of the agreement, aimed at facilitating the access of Italian companies to the markets of Asia and Africa, improving trade, and reciprocal investment.

Recently, he has been appointed as the Head of the Foreign Affairs and International Trade Department of Independence Movement, a newly formed Italian political movement. The primary objective of this movement is to bridge the gap between the West and East within the context of the evolution towards a multipolar world.

He holds the position of visiting professor in Finance and Economics at New York University Shanghai and is an honorary professor at Peking University. He speaks five languages and is a frequent guest on international media and conferences.

== Honours ==
In 2015, he also received, from President of Italy Sergio Mattarella, the honour of Knight of the Order of the Star of Italy for having contributed to the spread of knowledge of China in Italy.

He has also been knighted by the President of Georgia, Giorgi Margvelashvili.
