= Liu Boli =

Liu Boli (Chinese: 刘伯里; 17 March 1931 – 2 July 2018) was a Chinese nuclear chemist and expert in radiopharmaceuticals, considered a founder of the field in China. He was a professor at Beijing Normal University and an academician of the Chinese Academy of Engineering.

== Early life and education ==
Liu was born on 17 March 1931 in Changzhou, Jiangsu Province. After graduating from Changzhou Senior High School, he studied at the Department of Chemistry of East China Normal University in Shanghai, and earned his bachelor's degree in 1953. He was assigned to Beijing Normal University, where he worked and studied under Hu Zhibin (胡志彬). In 1958, he was transferred to the Institute of Nuclear Energy of the Chinese Academy of Sciences to study nuclear chemistry under Feng Xizhang (冯锡璋). It was a turning point in his career.

== Career ==
In the 1960s, Liu and his colleagues were tasked with recycling nuclear fuels from China's nuclear reactors. He worked under primitive conditions and was exposed to radiation for more than a decade, which caused his hair to turn gray before he was 40.

Starting in 1974, Liu focused on the application of nuclear science in medical fields and the research and development of radiopharmaceuticals. He became a professor at Beijing Normal University and served as deputy chair of its chemistry department and director of its Institute of Applied Chemistry. He made important discoveries in the properties of technetium-99m (99mTc), a radioactive isotope of technetium, and developed several medicines using 99mTc. He also researched radioactive isotopes of halogens, including bromine-82, iodine-131, and astatine-211.

Liu's research won many awards, including the National Science and Technology Conference Award (1979), the State Education Commission Science and Technology Progress Award, Second Class (1993 and 1998), and the State Science and Technology Progress Award, Second Class (1999). He was elected as an academician of the Chinese Academy of Engineering in 1997.

== Death ==
Liu died on 2 July 2018 in Beijing, at the age of 87.
