= Fabrice Houdart =

French LGBTQ advocate (born 1978)

- Born: 1978 (age 47–48); Paris XVIe, France
- Education: Paris Dauphine University (BA); American University (MBA)
- Occupation: Human rights advocate
- Known for: Whistleblowing at the World Bank; UN Global LGBTI Standards of Conduct for Business; Association of LGBTQ+ Corporate Directors
- Children: 2
- Website: fabricehoudart.com

Fabrice Houdart (born 1978) is a French human rights advocate and whistleblower. He worked at the World Bank from 2002 to 2016, where he led the institution's LGBTQ employee group and was demoted after identifying a payment to a senior executive. He later co-authored the United Nations Global LGBTI Standards of Conduct for Business.

== Education ==
Houdart holds a Bachelor of Arts in economics and management from Dauphine University and a Master of Business Administration from American University.

== Career ==
=== World Bank (2002–2016) ===
Houdart worked at the World Bank from 2002 to 2016 as a senior country officer for the Middle East and North Africa. From 2010 to 2014, he was president of GLOBE, the Bank's LGBTQ employee resource group, where he pushed leadership to consider the impact of its lending on LGBTQ populations.

In October 2014, during layoffs tied to a $400 million budget cut, Houdart identified a $94,000 (equivalent to $128,000 in 2025) payment to chief financial officer Bertrand Badré, which Badré described as a board-approved "scarce skills premium." The disclosure fueled employee protests, and President Jim Yong Kim held a town hall at which Badré returned the payment.

In early 2015, the Bank investigated Houdart for allegedly leaking a draft safeguards policy. The investigation cleared him of that allegation but found he had shared a separate internal document with the Bank Information Center, a watchdog organization involved in the safeguards process. The Bank demoted him and reduced his salary; a spokesman denied retaliation and said two other employees had been similarly disciplined for unauthorized disclosures. Houdart's attorneys at the Government Accountability Project maintained the inquiry was retaliatory. He resigned in 2016 to join the United Nations.

=== United Nations (2016–2020) ===
From 2016 to 2020, Houdart worked at the Office of the United Nations High Commissioner for Human Rights, where he contributed to the Free & Equal campaign and co-authored the United Nations Global LGBTI Standards of Conduct for Business.

=== Corporate governance and advocacy ===
In June 2022, Houdart founded the Association of LGBTQ+ Corporate Directors, where he is the executive director and consults on LGBTQ+ workplace and board inclusion. In 2024, he co-founded Koppa, an LGBTQ economic research initiative, with Lee Badgett and others.

Houdart is on the boards of OutRight Action International, Housing Works, and the Institute of Current World Affairs, where he founded the David Mixner LGBTQ+ Fellowship. He is also a member of the National Association of Corporate Directors Center for Inclusive Governance Advisory Council and the L'Oréal Global Diversity and Inclusion Advisory Board.

=== Teaching and commentary ===
Houdart is an adjunct professor at Georgetown University and Columbia University, where he teaches courses on sexual orientation, gender identity, and development. He has commented on corporate engagement with LGBTQ+ rights, including companies' retreat from diversity and Pride initiatives.

== Personal life ==
Houdart and his then-partner Roy Daiany had twins in 2013 through surrogacy in the United States, a process that cost over $100,000 and required consulting lawyers on three continents. France prohibits surrogacy and, at the time, did not grant citizenship to children of French citizens born through the practice abroad. His use of surrogacy drew criticism from conservative French media.
