= Yu Lizhong =

- 俞立中

1st Chancellor of New York University Shanghai
- In office 2012 – June 1, 2020
- Preceded by: Office established
- Succeeded by: Tong Shijun

Personal details
- Born: September 14, 1949 (age 76) Shanghai, China

Yu Lizhong (Chinese: 俞立中; born September 14, 1949) was the first chancellor of New York University Shanghai, and held this position from 2012 to 2020. He was awarded the title of chancellor emeritus of NYU Shanghai upon his retirement. Yu joined NYU Shanghai from East China Normal University (ECNU), where he served as president from 2006 to 2012. He also served as president of Shanghai Normal University prior to 2006.

== Education ==
Yu received his undergraduate degree in Geography from East China Normal University (ECNU) and his Ph.D. in Geography from the University of Liverpool. He also holds honorary doctorates from École Normale Supérieure and the University of Liverpool.

== Research and leadership ==
Yu's research focuses on environmental processes, environmental change, and sustainable development. He has published over 150 refereed papers in major journals, and has served on the boards of multiple educational, environmental, and scientific organizations throughout China. Yu served in several administrative capacities throughout his career at ECNU. Under his leadership, the ECNU embarked upon a path of growth and internationalization.
