= New York University Shanghai =

Joint-venture university in Shanghai, China

Coordinates: 31.2254°N 121.5344°E

- 上海纽约大学; Shanghai New York University
- Motto: Make the world your major.
- Type: Joint-venture university
- Established: 2012; 14 years ago
- Parent institution: East China Normal University and New York University
- Affiliations: AALAU
- Chancellor: Tong Shijun
- Vice-Chancellor: Jeffrey Lehman
- Provost: Bei Wu
- Students: over 2,100
- Undergraduates: 1,800
- Postgraduates: 300
- Location: 567 West Yangsi Road, Pudong, Shanghai, China
- Language: English
- Website: shanghai.nyu.edu

Chinese name
- Simplified Chinese: 上海纽约大学
- Traditional Chinese: 上海紐約大學
Transcriptions
Standard Mandarin
- Hanyu Pinyin: Shànghǎi Niǔyuē Dàxué

New York University Shanghai (NYU Shanghai; legal name registered as Shanghai New York University) is a Sino-foreign cooperative university in Pudong, Shanghai, China. It was established in 2012 under a partnership between East China Normal University and New York University. It is the third degree-granting campus of New York University.

Jointly established by the two universities with the support from the Shanghai Municipal People's Government in 2012, it was the first Sino-foreign joint university to receive independent legal entity accreditation from the Ministry of Education of China. Classes are in English. Upon graduation, undergraduate students will receive bachelor's degrees from both New York University and New York University Shanghai. Students can study abroad at one of New York University's 13 global academic centers and 2 degree-granting campuses.

== History ==
The school opened to students in September 2013. Of the class of 295 students, 51% came from The People's Republic of China, with the remaining 49% coming from other countries around the world. During the 2013–2014 academic year, NYU Shanghai students studied at East China Normal University while the official NYU campus in Pudong was built. The Pudong campus was completed in the summer of 2014. Students moved into the new building at the start of the fall 2014 semester. Currently, the NYU Shanghai campus in Pudong serves NYU Shanghai students, study abroad students from New York, Abu Dhabi, and non-NYU affiliated colleges in other countries, as well as a number of NYU law students.

In 2018, the university introduced a "civic education" course at the behest of the Chinese Communist Party. The annual two-week course, executed during the university's Christmas break every year, is mandatory for all Chinese passport holders attending NYU Shanghai and includes lessons such as "Promoting the Prosperity and Development of Socialist Culture with Chinese Characteristics." These additions have been criticized as a step away from the university's academic freedom and raised questions of university control. In 2021, in response to a discrimination lawsuit brought by an NYU Shanghai professor at the United States District Court for the Southern District of New York, the university stated that Shanghai New York University is not controlled by NYU.

During the 2019–2020 academic year, the commencement ceremony was moved online due to the ongoing COVID-19 public health restrictions. Jack Ma, the founder of Alibaba and the commencement speaker of the ceremony, called upon students to find "a common path forward, a common path for cooperation" between China and the United States in his commencement speech. He was also a recipient of NYU Shanghai Chancellor's Medal of Honor.

=== Timeline ===
Fall 2006: New York University established an overseas study center at East China Normal University, and 18 students came to ECNU to study.

September 2012: NYU Shanghai's registration as an independent institution approved by China's Ministry of Education.

March 2019: First NYU Shanghai Student wins the prestigious Knight-Hennessy Scholarship.

May 2019: NYU Shanghai breaks ground on new Qiantan campus.

May 2019: 2003 Economics Noble Laureate Robert Engle was appointed as the co-director of Volatility Institute at NYU Shanghai.

June 2020: Chancellor Yu Lizhong retires. Tong Shijun, a professor of philosophy at East China Normal University (ECNU) was named as the new Chancellor of NYU Shanghai.

=== Logo ===
NYU Shanghai's logo is adapted from NYU's torch logo, using the top half of the torch to form the petals of a magnolia flower, the official flower of Shanghai. The logo is meant to represent NYU's footing in Shanghai.

== Administration ==
=== Current Leadership ===
Chancellor: Tong Shijun. Tong Shijun is the Chancellor of NYU Shanghai. He was a professor of philosophy at East China Normal University and the former University Council Chairman of ECNU.

Inaugural Vice Chancellor: Jeffrey Lehman. Jeffrey Lehman is the Vice Chancellor of NYU Shanghai, where he oversees all academic and administrative operations. Lehman had previously served as dean of the University of Michigan Law School, the eleventh president of Cornell University, and the founding dean of the Peking University School of Transnational Law.

Provost: Bei Wu. Bei Wu is the Provost of NYU Shanghai. She was the Dean's Professor in Global Health and Vice Dean for Research at NYU's Rory Meyers College of Nursing, and the Director of International Research for the School of Nursing, prior to joining NYU.

=== Chancellor Emeritus ===
Yu Lizhong, the founding chancellor of NYU Shanghai, was president of East China Normal University (ECNU) from 2006 to 2012. He also served as chairman of the board and Chinese Communist Party Committee Secretary of the university.

== Campus ==
=== ECNU Zhongbei Campus (2013–) ===
The Class of 2017 of NYUSH spent their first academic year in the Zhongbei Campus of ECNU in Putuo District in 2013, as the Academic Building at Century Avenue was still under construction at that time.

=== Century Avenue (2014–2022) ===
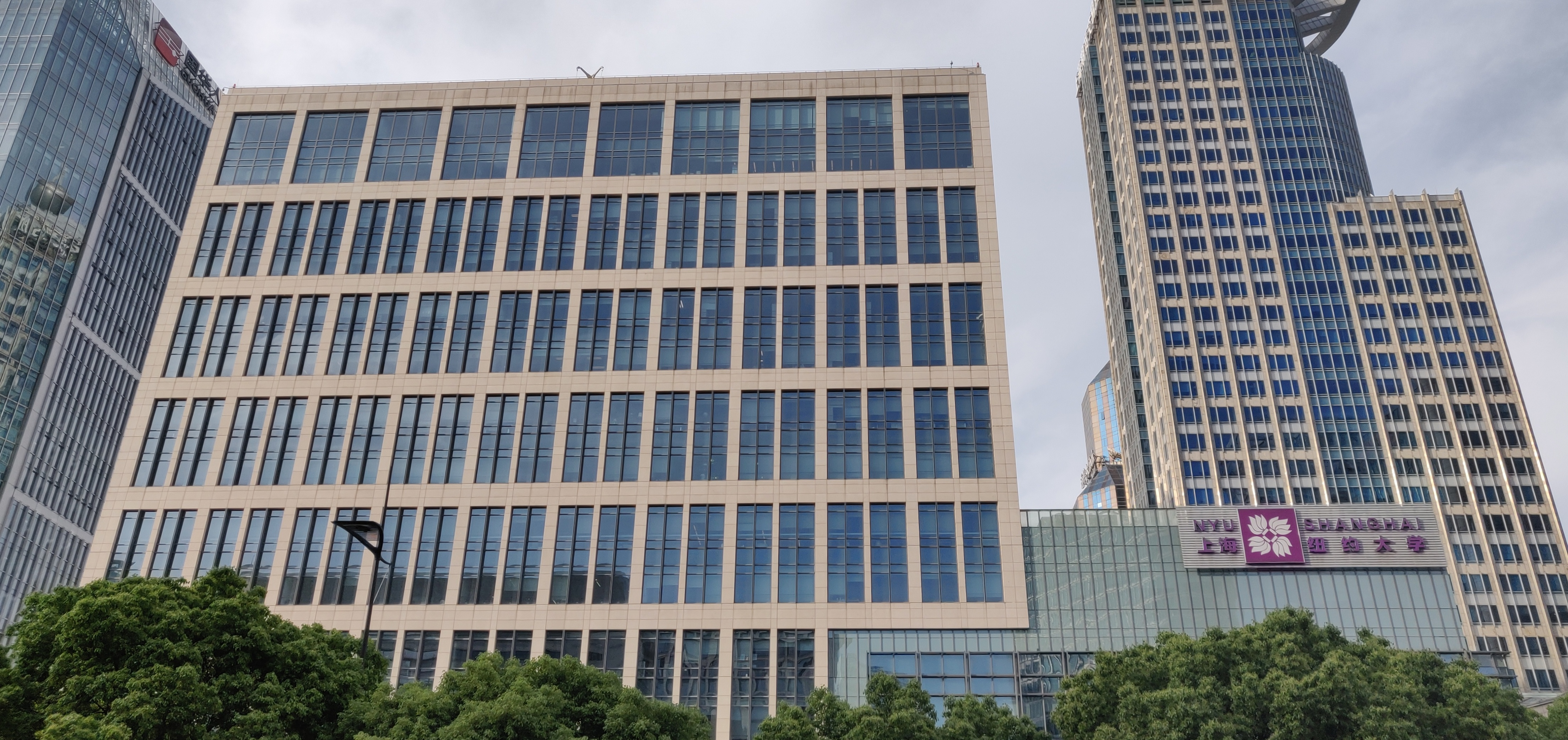
The Academic Center of NYU Shanghai

From 2014 to 2022, NYU Shanghai was based at 1555 Century Ave. in Pudong, Shanghai. The main campus was contained in a single building, the Academic Center, a 15-story building with two underground floors.

=== Qiantan (2023–present) ===
The groundbreaking ceremony was held for the 114,000 square meters new campus in Qiantan on May 30, 2019. The Qiantan Campus was designed and built by architectural firm Kohn Pedersen Fox (KPF). The design features four buildings arranged in a pinwheel shape reminiscent of NYU Shanghai's logo, connected as one building above the fifth floor. The university hoped to move up to 4,000 undergraduate and graduate students into the new campus since Spring, 2023.

== Residence Halls ==
=== Jinqiao and Pusan (2015–2022) ===
NYU Shanghai had two residence halls located within Pudong New Area when the main campus was at Century Avenue.

The Jinqiao Residence Halls, which were north of the Campus, consisted of 3 buildings in Green Center Towers and was home to the majority of the students. The residence halls were a 25-minute shuttle ride from the Academic Building and was served by shuttle buses scheduled around the academic schedule. Jinqiao Road Station of Metro Line 6 next to the halls provided convenient transportation to the students as well.

The relatively small Pusan Road residence halls were south of the Academic Building. They were also a 25-minute commute to the Academic Building via shuttle bus, which ran based on the academic calendar.

== Academics ==
=== Undergraduate programs ===
NYU Shanghai offers 19 majors, and numerous multidisciplinary minors and specializations.

In order to graduate, undergraduate students have to spend at least one semester studying away in New York, Abu Dhabi or at one of NYU's 13 study away centers in cities around the world.

In April 2019, NYU Shanghai has accepted 966 international students from a pool of 13,807 applications worldwide for the Class of 2023, resulting in an international acceptance rate of 7%.

For the Class of 2024, NYU Shanghai admitted 1,533 students from a total pool of over 13,000 applicants. The admitted Class of 2024 was one of NYU Shanghai's most geographically diverse classes, with students coming from 44 US states and 96 countries around the world.

=== Graduate and advanced education programs ===
The school also offers Masters programs and PhD programs.

==== PhD Programs ====
NYU Shanghai's PhD programs are offered jointly with other schools and departments of NYU, including the NYU Graduate School of Arts and Science, the NYU Tandon School of Engineering, and the NYU Robert F. Wagner Graduate School of Public Service, in the following subjects: Chemistry, Computer Science, Data Science, Electrical Engineering, Mathematics, Neural Science, Physics, Public Administration, Sociology, Transportation Systems.

== Research centers ==
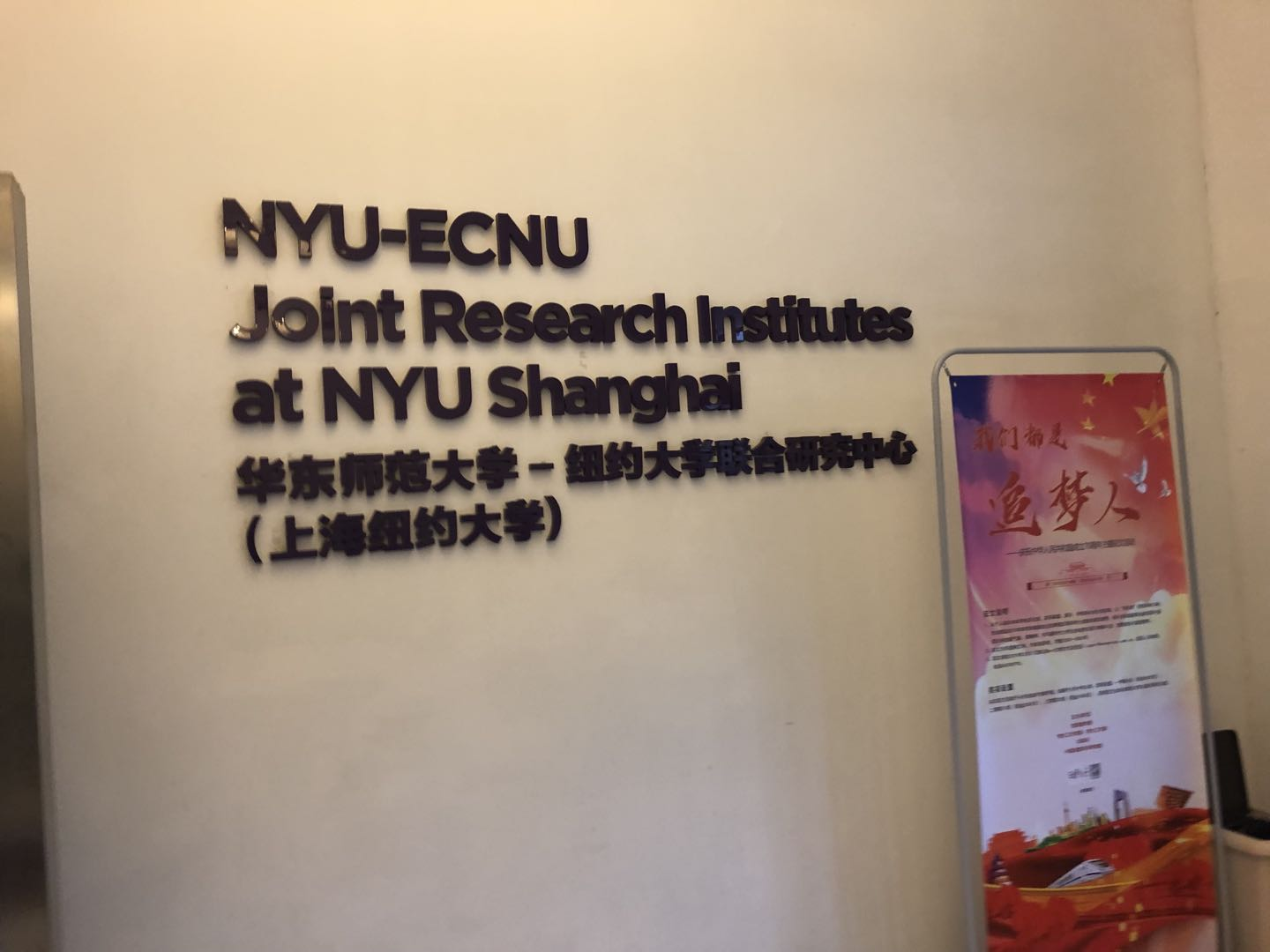
NYU–ECNU Joint Research Institutes at NYU Shanghai

NYU Shanghai houses 13 research institutes, some of which are in collaboration with East China Normal University (ECNU), they are listed as follows.

- NYU–ECNU Center for Computational Chemistry at NYU Shanghai
- NYU–ECNU Institute of Brain and Cognitive Science at NYU Shanghai
- NYU–ECNU Institute of Mathematical Sciences at NYU Shanghai
- NYU–ECNU Institute of Physics at NYU Shanghai
- NYU-ECNU Center on Global History, Economy, and Culture
- Volatility Institute at NYU Shanghai
- Center for Applied Social and Economic Research
- Center for Global Asia at NYU Shanghai
- Center for Data Science
- Center for Business Education and Research
- Center for Global Health Equity
- Center for Artificial Intelligence and Culture
- Shanghai Key Laboratory of Urban Design and Urban Science

== Athletics ==
NYU Shanghai's mascot is a purple Qilin designed by a student and decided by a popular vote, beating out other designs including a panda, dragon, lion, and original creature named Spark. NYU Shanghai offers competitive sports teams for badminton, tennis, basketball, fencing, flag football, soccer, and volleyball, competing against local universities and high schools in various leagues and city-sponsored events. NYU Shanghai also offers recreational activities such as yoga retreats, outdoor hikes, go-karting, and basketball tournaments, as well as semester-long group fitness classes including yoga, aerobics, cardio, strength conditioning, tai chi, and various dance classes such as traditional Chinese dance, K-pop dance, hip-hop dance, and salsa. These fitness classes meet weekly and offerings change from semester to semester.

== Notable faculty and Alumni ==
- Mateo Rengifo Orozco (Financier)
- Chen Jian, Distinguished Global Network Professor of History at New York University Shanghai, and visiting professor from Cornell University, Chinese history and international relations
- Jeffrey Lehman, former president of Cornell University, Dean of University of Michigan Law School
- Lin Fanghua, Affiliated Silver Professor of Mathematics
- Yu Lizhong, former president of East China Normal University
- Charles M. Newman, Affiliated Silver Professor of Mathematics; Director of the NYU–ECNU Institute of Mathematical Sciences at NYU Shanghai
- Clay Shirky, Associate Professor; studies social media
- Joanna Waley-Cohen, former head of the NYU New York History department
- Eitan Zemel, Associate Chancellor for Strategy and Dean of Business
- Paul Romer, winner of 2018 Nobel prize in Economics
- Benjamin H. Bratton, philosopher of technology
- Robert F. Engle, winner of 2003 Nobel prize in Economics; Co-Director of the Volatility Institute at NYU Shanghai
- Michele Geraci, Adjust Professor of Finance; former Undersecretary of State at the Italian Ministry of Economic Development
- Bright Sheng, Visiting Professor of Music; 2001 MacArthur Fellowship recipient and two-time Pulitzer Prize finalist
- Ray Suarez, Visiting Professor; American broadcast journalist and author
- Gish Jen, Visiting Professor of Literature; American author and speaker; member of the American Academy of Arts and Sciences
- Yao Lin, Assistant Professor of Practice in Political Science

== See also ==
- New York University Abu Dhabi
- New York University
- East China Normal University
