= Suzy Hansen =

American writer

- Born: September 4, 1977 (age 48); Wall Township, New Jersey, U.S.
- Education: University of Pennsylvania (BA)
- Occupation: Journalist
- Notable work: Notes on a Foreign Country: An American Abroad in a Post-America World
- Website: suzyhansen.com

Suzy Hansen (born September 4, 1977) is an American writer. Her book Notes on a Foreign Country: An American Abroad in a Post-America World was a finalist for the 2018 Pulitzer Prize for General Nonfiction.

== Early life and education ==
Hansen was born in Wall Township, New Jersey, to parents of Danish, Italian, and Irish descent. She attended Wall High School and the University of Pennsylvania for her undergraduate degree.

== Career ==
After earning her degree, she worked as an editor at The New York Observer until 2007, when she received a fellowship from the Institute of Current World Affairs to conduct research in Turkey. While in Istanbul, she realized many misconceptions of how Americans view themselves versus how outsiders view them. This was the basis for her 2017 book, Notes on a Foreign Country: An American Abroad in a Post-America World. Her debut book about American misconceptions post 9/11 was a finalist for the 2018 Pulitzer Prize for General Nonfiction.

She also visited Greece, Egypt, Iraq, and Afghanistan to investigate how American influence caused trouble and misfortune for civilians in these countries.

In 2020, she accepted a visiting professorship position at Princeton University as their Ferris Professor of Journalism.

She is also a contributing writer for The New York Times Magazine and Practitioner-in-Residence at New York University’s Kevorkian Center for Near Eastern Studies.

== Bibliography ==
=== Books ===
- Suzy Hansen, Notes on a Foreign Country: An American Abroad in a Post-America World, 2017.
- From Life Itself: Turkey, Istanbul , and a Neighborhood in the Age of Erdogan, 2026.

=== Articles ===
- Suzy Hansen, "Twenty Years of Outsourced War" (review of Phil Klay, Uncertain Ground: Citizenship in an Age of Endless, Invisible War, Penguin Press, 2022, 252 pp.; and Phil Klay, Missionaries, Penguin, 2020, 407 pp.), The New York Review of Books, vol. LXX, no. 16 (19 October 2023), pp. 26–28. "Klay remains transfixed by the idea that in Iraq and Afghanistan, and in all contemporary American wars, there have been not only no definable diplomatic or political objectives, but also no definable military objectives. No one has any clue what they're fighting for or even 'clear benchmarks of success.' That means that there is no obvious enemy, or that one's perception of the enemy keeps shifting. 'If you think the mission your country keeps sending you on is pointless or impossible and that you're only deploying to protect your brothers and sisters in arms from danger,' Klay writes, 'then it's not the Taliban or al-Qaeda or ISIS that's trying to kill you, it's America.'" (p. 28.)
