= Zheng Kelu =

Chinese translator (1939–2020)

- 郑克鲁
- Born: August 1, 1939; Portuguese Macau
- Died: September 20, 2020 (aged 81); Shanghai, China
- Education: Peking University
- Occupations: Translator, professor
- Spouse: Zhu Biheng
- Writing career
- Language: Chinese, French
- Period: 1979–2020

Chinese name
- Traditional Chinese: 鄭克魯
- Simplified Chinese: 郑克鲁
Transcriptions
Standard Mandarin
- Hanyu Pinyin: Zhèng Kèlǔ

Zheng Kelu (Chinese: 郑克鲁; August 1, 1939 – September 20, 2020) was a Chinese translator best known for translating French literature. For his contributions to the introduction of French literature to foreign readers, he was honored with the French National Medal in Education (First Class) in 1987 by René Monory.

== Biography ==
Zheng was born in Portuguese Macau on August 1, 1939. His grandfather Zheng Guanying was a reformist active in the late Qing dynasty. In the third grade of primary school, Zheng went to study at Nanyang Model Primary School after his father's job transferred to Shanghai. After graduating from No.1 High School Affiliated to East China Normal University in 1957, he was admitted by Peking University. He liked Russian literature and planned to apply for the Russian Department, but the Sino-Soviet relationship was so tense that the Russian Department did not recruit new students, so he entered the French department.

After university in 1962, he did his postgraduate work at the Institute of Foreign Literature, Chinese Academy of Social Sciences under Li Jianwu. In 1969, he was sent to the May Seventh Cadre Schools to do farm works in Xi County, Henan. At the end of the Cultural Revolution, he reviewed French and recited French dictionaries in his spare time.

In 1979, he completed and published his first literary translation Longevity Potion (written by Honoré de Balzac) in World Literature magazine. Then he translated several pieces of Honoré de Balzac's works successively. From 1981 to 1983, he was a visiting scholar at the University of Sorbonne Nouvelle Paris 3. In 1984, he joined the faculty of Wuhan University and became director of its French Department and director of the Institute of French Studies. He joined the China Writers Association in 1984 and joined the Chinese Communist Party in 1985. On March 13, 1987, the French government bestowed its National Medal in Education (First Class) on him for his contributions to the introduction of French literature to foreign readers. He was transferred to Shanghai in 1987 and that same year became a professor at Shanghai Normal University, where he worked until his retirement in 2009. He died at Shanghai Sixth People's Hospital on September 20, 2020.

== Personal life ==
Zheng married Zhu Biheng, an English literature translator.

== Works ==
- 外国文学史 [History of Foreign Literature] (in Chinese). Hubei: Chongwen Publishing House. 2016. ISBN 9787540317263.

== Translations ==
- Antoine de Saint-Exupéry (2018). The Little Prince [小王子] (in Chinese). Zhejiang Business University Press: Zhejiang. ISBN 9787517827122.
- Stendhal (2018). The Red and the Black [红与黑] (in Chinese). Beijing: Commercial Press. ISBN 9787100156837.
- Honoré de Balzac (2018). Père Goriot [高老头] (in Chinese). Beijing: Commercial Press. ISBN 9787100156820.
- Honoré de Balzac (2018). Eugénie Grandet [欧仁妮·葛朗台] (in Chinese). Beijing: Commercial Press. ISBN 9787100156844.
- Alexandre Dumas fils (2018). La Dame aux Camélias [茶花女] (in Chinese). Beijing: Commercial Press. ISBN 9787100156851.
- Alexandre Dumas (2020). The Count of Monte Cristo [基督山伯爵] (in Chinese). Beijing: Yilin Press. ISBN 9787544777490.
- Victor Hugo (2018). Les Misérables [悲惨世界] (in Chinese). Beijing: Commercial Press. ISBN 9787100156905.
- Victor Hugo (2017). Notre-Dame de Paris [巴黎圣母院] (in Chinese). Beijing: China Friendship Publishing Company. ISBN 9787505738676.
- Victor Hugo (2018). Ninety-Three [九三年] (in Chinese). Beijing: Commercial Press. ISBN 9787100157230.
- Victor Hugo (2018). The Man Who Laughs [笑面人] (in Chinese). Beijing: Commercial Press. ISBN 9787100157216.
- Jules Verne (2018). The Mysterious Island [神秘岛] (in Chinese). Beijing: Commercial Press. ISBN 9787100156868.
- Jules Verne (2019). Around the World in Eighty Days [八十天环游地球] (in Chinese). Shanghai: Haiyan Publishing House. ISBN 9787535078216.
- Albert Camus (2018). The Stranger [局外人] (in Chinese). Beijing: Commercial Press. ISBN 9787100156929.
- Jules Verne (2018). Twenty Thousand Leagues Under the Sea [海底两万里] (in Chinese). Beijing: Commercial Press. ISBN 9787100156875.
- Maurice Maeterlinck (2018). The Blue Bird [青鸟] (in Chinese). Beijing: Commercial Press. ISBN 9787100156899.
- George Sand (2018). La Mare au Diable [魔沼] (in Chinese). Beijing: Commercial Press. ISBN 9787100156912.

== Awards ==
- 1987 French National Medal in Education (First Class) for his contributions to the introduction of French literature to foreign readers
- 2010 Title of "Senior Translator" by the Chinese Translation Association
- 2012 Fu Lei Translation and Publishing Award for translating The Second Sex
