= Yuan Zhongyi =

Chinese archaeologist

Yuan Zhongyi (袁仲一; born 1932) is a Chinese archaeologist.

He is best known for his work in the excavation and preservation of the Terracotta Army in Xi'an, China and is praised as "the father of the Terracotta Warriors".

Yuan graduated from East China Normal University in Shanghai where he received the bachelor's and master's degrees of history respectively in 1960 and 1963.
