= United Nations Free & Equal =

United Nations Free & Equal is a global public information campaign led by the United Nations Human Rights Office. The campaign advances equal rights and fair treatment for lesbian, gay, bi, trans, and intersex (LGBTI) individuals around the world, and is actualized in association with UN offices, common society associations and, in certain countries, national and civil specialists. The campaign is financed by a few governments, just as commitments from various privately owned businesses, among them the style brands H&M, Gap Inc., Kenneth Cole, and Weekday.

In its first five years, the campaign regularly reached the social media streams of between one and two billion people a year, and millions more via traditional media, including television and radio. UN Free & Equal is supported by a number of celebrities: the "Equality Champions", prominent individuals from the fields of music, film and television who help share campaign materials with their fans and followers on social media. As of July 2019, Equality Champions included musician and human rights advocate Yvonne Chaka Chaka from South Africa, Indian actor and model Celina Jaitly, U.S. rap duo Macklemore and Ryan Lewis, Puerto Rican musician Ricky Martin, Brazilian singer Daniela Mercury, and members of the U.S. band fun.

== Aim & Objectives ==
The UN Free and Equal Campaign 2018 Progress Report depicts the campaign's overall goal as being to "bring issues to light of sexual, sex and substantial assorted variety, and supporter for equivalent rights and reasonable treatment of lesbian, gay, bi, trans and intersex (LGBTI) individuals all over the place." The campaign's particular destinations are: :

- scatter messages from the United Nations on the side of LGBTI equity and acknowledgment and countering preference and unsafe generalizations coordinated at LGBTI individuals, in both conventional and online networking.
- bolster nation level United Nations backing for the human privileges of LGBTI individuals, including through dispersion of open data materials and devices.

== History ==
UN Free & Equal was developed by the UN Human Rights Office under the leadership of then UN High Commissioner for Human Rights Navi Pillay. At the campaign's global press launch in Cape Town on 26 July 2013, Pillay was joined by South African Constitutional Court equity Edwin Cameron and Archbishop Emeritus Desmond Tutu. Explaining the rationale for the new campaign, Pillay said, "The Universal Declaration of Human Rights promises a world in which everyone is born free and equal in dignity and rights – no exceptions, no-one left behind. Yet it’s a hollow promise for many millions of LGBT people forced to confront hatred, intolerance, violence and widespread discrimination on a daily basis." She alluded to the work by her Office in looking for changes to prejudicial laws yet included that legitimate changes without anyone else could never be adequate to secure individuals. "We know from experience that eradicating discrimination requires more than just changes in laws and policies. It takes a change in people’s hearts and minds as well.”

In its initial five years, the campaign delivered more than 80 original videos and in excess of 400 images and GIFs for use via web-based networking media, just as a progression of scaled down campaigns on explicit points going from youth tormenting to trans and intersex visibility. Other outputs included ten plain-language factsheets on a variety of LGBTI-related topics; a set of UN Free & Equal postage stamps celebrating progress towards LGBT equality; a rainbow crosswalk ("the Path to Equality") positioned in front of UN Headquarters in New York City; and a global film series, organized in partnership with Film Independent. Campaign materials have been made available in all official UN languages (i.e. English, French, Spanish, Arabic, Chinese and Russian) as well as Portuguese, with some content also translated into additional languages, including Albanian, Italian, Japanese, Khmer, Serbian and Ukrainian.

== Videos ==
UN Free and Equal has made extensive use of video to spread its messages, discharging in excess of 80 pieces of unique video content somewhere in the range of 2013 and 2019. A few of these rank among the most broadly watched recordings at any point delivered by the UN Human Rights Office: as of mid-2019, the five most-saw recordings on the UN Human Rights Office's YouTube Channel – and almost all the top 20 – were UN Free and Equal recordings.

The first UN Free & Equal video, The Riddle, was produced by Purpose and discharged online in front of the campaign's global launch in July 2013. The video highlighted people of assorted foundations posing inquiries direct to camera and cameo appearances by UN Secretary-General Ban Ki-moon and UN High Commissioner Navi Pillay. The video was screened at the worldwide crusade dispatch in July 2013 and at regional launch events, and was shared broadly via web-based networking media, aggregating more than 1.8 million views on YouTube.

In April 2014, the campaign launched a Bollywood-style music video, The Welcome", featuring a young man who brings his boyfriend home to meet his family. UN Equality Champion Celina Jaitly starred in the video and made her debut as a vocalist on the clip's soundtrack. The video was launched at a press event in Mumbai that also featured remarks by Indian actor Imran Khan, Indian activists Ashok Row Kavi and Laxmi Tripathi and Charles Radcliffe and Jyoti Sanghera of the UN. The video generated widespread press interest in India and racked up more than 2.4 million views on YouTube, making it the UN's most widely watched video at the time.

Other popular videos include "Faces", which featured a series of "everyday heroes" who happen to be part of LGBTI, and "Be There" — an appeal to the friends and family of LGBTI people to step forward and become active allies in the fight for equality.

== Factsheets ==
As of July 2019, the campaign had published ten plain language factsheets on a range of topics from criminalization of same-sex relationships, to bullying, discrimination, violence, asylum, gender identity, bisexuality and the rights of intersex people, as well as a more general Frequently Asked Questions/FAQ on LGBTI issues. All factsheets are available via the UN Free & Equal website in all UN languages as well as in Portuguese.

== National campaigns ==
Initially conceived as a global multimedia campaign, UN Free & Equal has inspired and supported an increasing number of national-level events and in some cases fully-fledged national campaigns in some 30 countries over five years. These events and campaigns fluctuate in scale and length - from transient activities worked around a solitary occasion or bit of substance, to progressively eager, broad and long-running efforts crossing quite a while. Exercises at the national level are ordinarily sorted out by the neighborhood UN human rights field nearness or by different individuals from the UN nation group.

According to the campaign's 2018 Progress Report, In 2018, UN teams in 12 countries ran full-scale national spin-off campaigns or organized UN Free & Equal events at the national level: Albania, Brazil, Cabo Verde, Cambodia, Dominican Republic, Guatemala, Macedonia, Mongolia, Peru, Serbia, Timor Leste and Ukraine.

== High-level events at UN Headquarters ==
Between 2013 and 2019, UN Free & Equal supported and promoted 14 high-profile events at UN Headquarters in New York featuring sporting celebrities and musicians, senior UN and national leaders and leading civil society activists. Many of these events were co-sponsored by supportive Member States of the LGBTI Core Group at the United Nations

In September 2013, the campaign helped organize and publicize the first ever ministerial-level meeting on LGBT issues to be held at the United Nations. The meeting, which took place in the margins of the opening of the 68th Session of the General Assembly, featured remarks by, among others, then U.S. Secretary of State John Kerry and UN human rights chief Navi Pillay as well as ministers from Argentina, Brazil, Croatia, France, the Netherlands and Norway, and top diplomats from Japan, New Zealand and the European Union. Similar ministerial meetings were held in September 2014, 2015 and 2017, and in 2016, the campaign supported and sponsored a first-of-its kind discussion at the United Nations of LGBTI human rights issues among Heads of State and Government.

== Other initiatives ==
The UN Free and Equal website includes a rage of different materials, made to help clarify LGBTI issues and feature related human rights difficulties to adherents of the battle. Outstanding activities incorporate an intuitive guide that permits clients to look through time and perceive how laws against same-sex relationships spread in the nineteenth and mid twentieth hundreds of years during times of frontier rule, before the pattern was turned around in the second 50% of the twentieth century as the procedure of decolonization accumulated pace. The site additionally has several sharable GIFs and images conveying key crusade messages, just as connections to related assets.

In September 2014, with the help of the LGBTI Core Group of UN Member States, the crusade set up an UN Free and Equal photograph stall at the passageway to the General Assembly. Several UN delegates visited the stall and posted photos of themselves via web-based networking media holding up campaign placards.

In 2015, UN Free and Equal propelled a Global Film Series as a team with the UN Department of Public Information and the Los Angeles-based Film Independent. The Film Series furnished UN workplaces around the globe with rights to screen a progression of LGBTI-themed narratives and story films without cost.

In February 2016, the campaign propelled what it professed to be the world's first stamp set celebrating worldwide advancement towards LGBTI equality. The stamps, created in a joint effort with and gave by the UN Postal Administration, were accessible for buy on the web and could be utilized to mail letters from assigned UN postal counters and assortment focuses.

In September 2016, the battle uncovered "The Path to Equality" - a rainbow hued crosswalk introduced across First Avenue in New York City before the United Nations Headquarters. The crosswalk was a joint effort between the UN Human Rights Office, the U.S. Permanent Mission to the United Nations, and different individuals from the LGBTI Core Group at the United Nations.

== Campaign leadership, staffing and partnerships ==
UN Free & Equal is an initiative of the UN Human Rights Office. Launched during Navi Pillay's tenure as High Commissioner for Human Rights (2008-2014), the campaign has been maintained by successive High Commissioners - notably Zeid Ra'ad Al Hussein (2014-2018) and Michelle Bachelet (2018–present). The campaign was originally proposed and developed by the UN Human Rights Office's Senior Adviser on Human Rights, Sexual Orientation & Gender Identity Charles Radcliffe, who led the campaign during its first five years (2013-2018) with the support of UN human rights officer Toiko Kleppe (2013–14). Fabrice Houdart worked on the campaign from 2016 to 2020 and co-wrote with Salil Tripathi the United Nations LGBTI Corporate Standards of Conduct in 2017 Rikke Hennum joined the campaign as coordinator in 2015, and in 2018 took on the role of campaign manager.

UN Free & Equal has worked with many different creative partners to develop campaign videos and other materials for global use - among them purpose.com (U.S.), Create History (UK), Elkanodata (Spain), Prime Content (U.S.) and Curry Nation (India). Also, huge numbers of the national Free and Equal battles made in different nations have built up their own coordinated efforts with neighborhood innovative organizations.

In 2018 and 2019, apparel retailers Gap Inc. furthermore, H&M both declared that they would give a level of the returns of the offer of Pride-themed clothing to help the UN Free and Equal crusade, with subsidizing being given by means of the United Nations Foundation. In 2019, Kenneth Cole Productions and the Swedish fashion brand Weekday announced that they would also be supporting the campaign.

== Criticism ==
The launch in February 2016 of an assortment of UN Free and Equal postage stamps celebrating worldwide advancement towards LGBT balance was met with analysis from some Africa, Arab and Islamic UN Member States, just as preservationist strict associations in the U.S. Almost 100,000 people supported an online petition on the website CitizenGO condemning the UN's decision to issue the stamps and calling for their withdrawal. According to the UN Free & Equal campaign, more than 150,000 stamps from the collection were sold at UN postal counters and via the UN Stamps website, with proceeds being plowed back into the general United Nations budget.

== See also ==
- LGBT rights at the United Nations
