= East China Normal University Press =

Chinese university press

- Parent company: East China Normal University
- Founded: 1957; 69 years ago
- Country of origin: China
- Headquarters location: Shanghai
- Official website: www.ecnupress.com.cn

East China Normal University Press (Chinese: 华东师范大学出版社; pinyin: Huádōng Shīfàn Dàxué Chūbǎnshè; also referred to as ECNU Press or ECNUP) is the publishing division of East China Normal University. Its headquarters are in Shanghai, and it has a Beijing branch.

The ECNU Press is founded in 1957 in Shanghai. Before the reform and opening up in the 1980s, it was one of the only two university presses existed in China (the other being the China Renmin University Press).

As of 2008, its total income reached 588 million RMB. This total ranked ECNUP the 14th among the 573 publishers in China.
