= Bligny-lès-Beaune =

- Commune
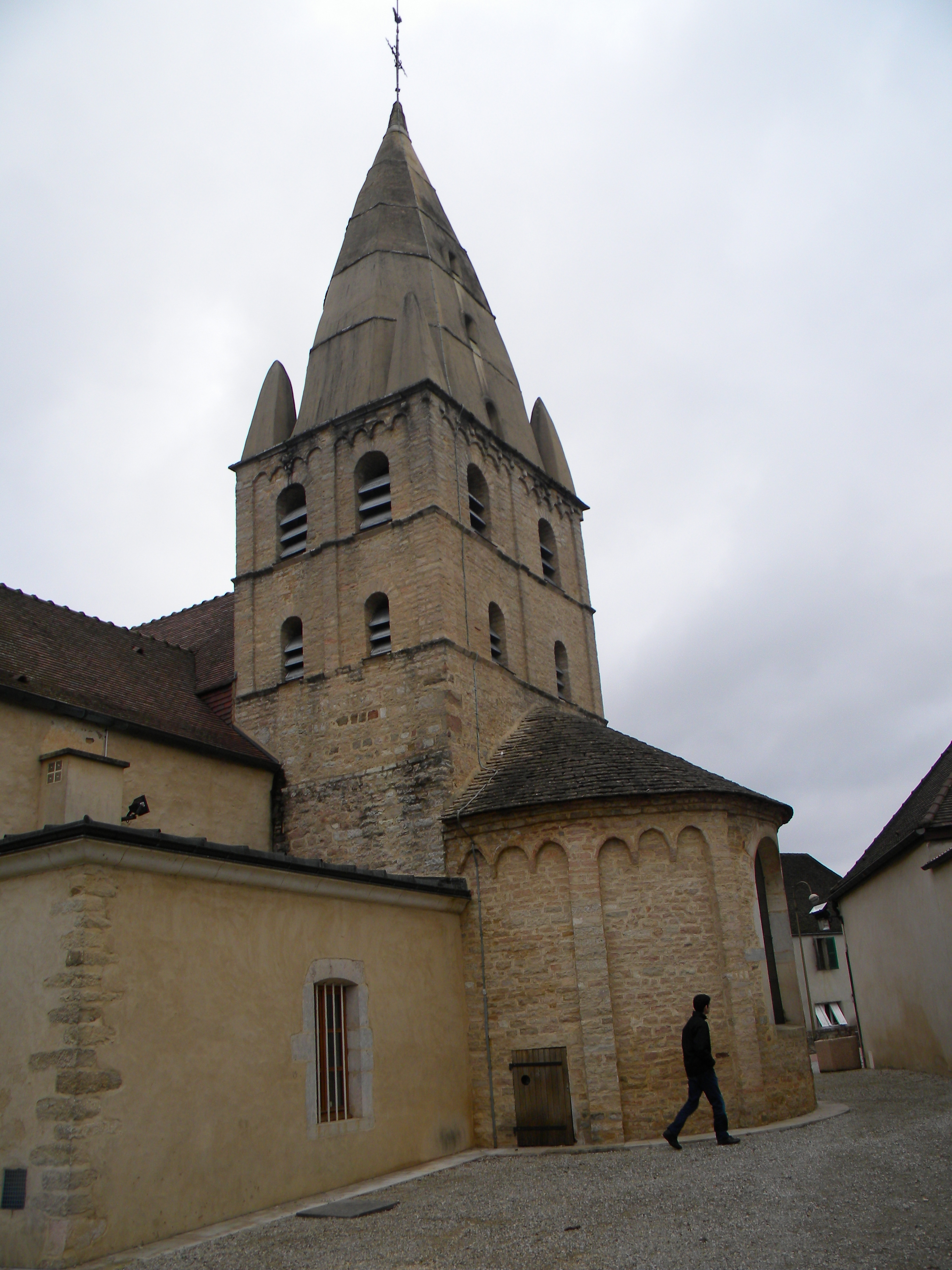
- The church in Bligny-lès-Beaune

- Coat of arms
- Location of Bligny-lès-Beaune
- Location within France Location within Bourgogne-Franche-Comté
- Coordinates: 46°59′15″N 4°49′32″E
- Country: France
- Region: Bourgogne-Franche-Comté
- Department: Côte-d'Or
- Arrondissement: Beaune
- Canton: Ladoix-Serrigny
- Intercommunality: CA Beaune Côte et Sud

Government
  - Mayor (2020–2026): Didier Duriaux
- Area^{1}: 7.3 km^{2} (2.8 sq mi)
- Highest elevation: 225 m (738 ft)
- Lowest elevation: 199 m (653 ft)
- Population (2023): 1,288
  - Density: 180/km^{2} (460/sq mi)
- Time zone: UTC+01:00 (CET)
  - Summer (DST): UTC+02:00 (CEST)
- INSEE/Postal code: 21086 /21200
- ^{1} French Land Register data, which excludes lakes, ponds, glaciers > 1 km^{2} (0.386 sq mi or 247 acres) and river estuaries.

Bligny-lès-Beaune (French pronunciation: [bliɲi lɛ bon], literally Bligny near Beaune) is a commune in the Côte-d'Or department in eastern France.

== Population ==
Historical population
Year	Pop.	±% p.a.
1968	552	—
1975	695	+3.35%
1982	948	+4.53%
1990	1,076	+1.60%
1999	1,170	+0.93%
2007	1,183	+0.14%
2012	1,237	+0.90%
2017	1,238	+0.02%
2023	1,288	+0.66%
Source: INSEE

== Notable people ==
- Jean Dard
- Charlotte-Adélaïde Dard

== See also ==
- Communes of the Côte-d'Or department
