= No. 2 High School of East China Normal University =

Public school in Shanghai, China

Coordinates: 31°12′11″N 121°35′13″E

- 华东师范大学第二附属中学

Location
- 555 Chenhui Rd, Zhangjiang; Shanghai, 201203; China

Information
- Type: Public secondary school
- Established: 1958
- Principal: Zhou Bin (周彬)
- Staff: 140
- Gender: Co-ed
- Age: 15 to 18
- Enrollment: 1400+
- Campus: Suburban, 50,879 square metres (13 acres)
- Affiliations: East China Normal University
- Website: www.hsefz.cn

No. 2 High School of East China Normal University
- Traditional Chinese: 華東師範大學第二附屬中學
- Simplified Chinese: 华东师范大学第二附属中学
Transcriptions
Standard Mandarin
- Hanyu Pinyin: Huádōng Shīfàn Dàxué Dì Ér Fùshǔ Zhōngxué

No. 2 High School of East China Normal University is a public secondary school located in Shanghai, China.

== See also ==
- East China Normal University
