= Root Capital =

US-based nonprofit organization

- Founded: 1999
- Founder: William Fulbright Foote
- Type: Nonprofit
- Location: Cambridge, Massachusetts
- Region served: Africa, Latin America, and Southeast Asia
- Key people: William Fulbright Foote (founder, CEO)
- Website: rootcapital.org

Root Capital is a nonprofit organization operating in poor rural areas of Africa, Latin America, and Southeast Asia. According to its website, Root Capital "seeks to maximize the positive social and environmental impact of [its] work through a three-pronged strategy: finance, advise, and catalyze."

== Operations ==
Root Capital claims to follow a three-step approach towards making a positive impact in the poor rural areas of Africa and Latin America where it operates. The three steps are:

- Finance: This involves making loans to rural small and growing businesses, including both short-term and long-term loans.
- Advise: This involves delivering financial training to current and prospective clients.
- Catalyze: This involves innovating on their own methodology to increase their own impact.

According to its impact page, Root Capital has disbursed US$1.5 billion between 1999 and 2020 and reached 9.9 million household members in rural communities.

Root Capital is one of several money managers to pursue a gender lens investing strategy. In 2012, Root Capital launched their Women in Agriculture Initiative (WAI) to address the unique challenges faced by women in rural areas. The WAI uses capacity-building training and gender-lens investing to unlock growth at women-led and gender-inclusive businesses. These businesses, which represent 48% of Root Capital's portfolio, must have at least 30% women farmers and employees (or at least 20% if they are also women-led).

== Funding ==
Root Capital seeks funding from both individual donors and foundations. Foundations that have funded Root capital include Mulago Foundation, Jasmine Social Investments, and Peery Foundation.

== External reviews ==
Charity Navigator had given Root Capital a four-star rating (its highest possible) continuously beginning in 2005, but downgraded their rating to three stars on December 1, 2019. It has since regained its four-star rating.

In 2024, Root Capital was awarded the Specialty Coffee Association Nonprofit Sustainability Award for their work collaborating across geographies, cultures, and supply chain roles, and sharing the lessons they have learned for the benefit of the entire coffee sector.

Charity evaluator GiveWell had a conversation with the CEO of Root Capital in September 2011, and planned to publish a detailed review of Root Capital in 2013, however GiveWell's review of Root Capital was still not complete as of November 2019.
