= Focus Media =

Chinese advertising company

- Type: Public
- Traded as: SZSE: 002027; Nasdaq: FMCN; CSI A50
- Industry: Advertising
- Founded: 2003; 23 years ago
- Headquarters: Shanghai, China
- Key people: Jason Jiang (chairman & CEO); Weiwei Kong (CFO)
- Revenue: $0.9 billion USD (6.06 billion RMB) (2021)
- Operating income: $2.176 billion USD (14.84 billion RMB) (2021)
- Net income: $23.548 million USD (2005)
- Number of employees: 5309
- Website: www.focusmedia.cn/en

Focus Media Information Technology (known simply as Focus Media and formerly Focus Media Holding) is an international out-of-home advertising and digital media company. It was founded in 2003 by advertising executive Jason Jiang, who is CEO. The company pioneered global elevator-based advertising model and operates in over 15 countries across 5 continents which consist predominantly of digital signage screens and residential apartments, together with community space advertising. Since December 2015 the company has traded on the Shenzhen Stock Exchange under the stock code 002027.

== History ==
In May 2013, Focus Media was subsequently taken private and delisted from the Nasdaq by a private equity consortium that included FountainVest Partners, The Carlyle Group, China Everbright and CITIC Capital.

In June 2015, Focus Media reached a $7.4 billion deal to list on the Shenzhen Stock Exchange via reverse merger. Its market value breaks through 100 billion yuan. In 2016, Focus Media was included in the Shanghai and Shenzhen 300 Index. In 2017, Focus was included in the MSCI China A-share Index, and in 2024, Focus was included in the CSI A50 Index.

== Public response ==
In 2025, a student in Shanghai University named Kong Junyou shut down more than 100 elevator advertising screens during a five-day protest against intrusive advertising noise. Sixth Tone reported that the advertisements he targeted belonged to Focus Media, which promotes enclosed elevators as “high-attention” and relatively distraction-free environments for brand exposure. The action prompted online discussion about residents’ consent, advertising revenue, and the commercial use of shared residential spaces.

== Official Websites ==
- Focus Media Australia
- Focus Media Brazil
- Focus Media British Virgin Islands
- Focus Media Canada
- Focus Media China
- Focus Media Germany
- Focus Media Hong Kong (China)
- Focus Media India
- Focus Media Indonesia
- Focus Media Japan
- Focus Media Malaysia
- Focus Media Singapore
- Focus Media South Korea
- Focus Media Thailand
- Focus Media United Arab Emirates
- Focus Media United Kingdom
- Focus Media Vietnam
