= Joanna Wan-Ying Chan =

Chinese-American Roman Catholic nun, playwright, director, and artist (1939-)

Joanna Wan-Ying Chan M. M.
- 陳尹瑩

Personal life
- Born: January 1, 1939 (age 87) Hong Kong
- Education: Tack Ching Girls' Secondary School; Chung Chi College; Teachers College, Columbia University (M.A., M.Ed., Ed.D.)

Religious life
- Religion: Christianity
- Denomination: Roman Catholicism
- Institute: Maryknoll Sisters

Joanna Wang-Ying Chan (陳尹瑩; born 1939) is a Chinese-American Roman Catholic religious sister and a playwright, director, and visual artist.

== Life ==
Chan was born in Hong Kong in 1939, and was raised in Guangzhou, China. She and members of her family converted to Roman Catholicism in 1955, when she was 16. She returned to Hong Kong for education, attending Tack Ching Girls' Secondary School and Chung Chi College, Chinese University, where she majored in mathematics. As part of her education, she trained in graphic design.

She joined the Maryknoll order in 1965. She underwent religious training in the Philippines, and her first assignment was in the United States, teaching seventh-graders in Chicago although she was not yet fluent in English.

In 1969, Chan was appointed the first Director of Youth Services at the Church of the Transfiguration in Chinatown, Manhattan. The church's priest-pastor directed Chan to find what the neighborhood needed. Chan felt that Chinatown was largely fragmented, and decided to put on community events to bring the neighborhood together. For Lunar New Year in February 1970, Chan put on the play The Emperor’s Daughter (帝女花), which was well received. The performance was adapted from the full-length opera, with simplified choreography for the amateur performers, marking an approach that Chan would continue to use: audience accessibility over authenticity. The show's cast ranged in age and background, including some Puerto Rican and Italian performers. The show's success led Chan to co-found the Four Seas Players in September 1970. As an artistic director of the Four Seas Players, Chan curated the repertory to include both well-known Western plays and traditional and contemporary Chinese works. The group's first production, for Lunar New Year in 1971, was an adaptation of The Tale of the Romantic Fan, set in late Ming China rather than 18th-century Italy.

Chan pursued further education at Teachers College, Columbia University, earning an M.A. (1971), M.Ed. (1974) and Ed.D. (1977). Her 1977 dissertation was titled "The Four Seas Players: Towards an Alternative Form of Chinese Theatre; A Case Study of a Community Theatre in Chinatown, New York City".

In 1975, she began writing her own plays. She began staging plays across the country after 1980. In the 1980s, she was Artist Director of the Hong Kong Repertory Theatre. In total, she was involved with the theatre for 25 years, also serving as a guest director and playwright.

Chan was a columnist for the Hong Kong newspaper New Evening Post from 1986 to 1997.

In 1994, she co-founded the Yangtze Repertory Theatre of America in New York.

Beginning in the 2000s, she worked with the Sing Sing Rehabilitation Through Arts program in Westchester, New York as a guest playwright and director.

== Plays ==
- Before the Dawn-wind Rises
- Crown Ourselves with Roses (1988)
- The Soongs (1992)
- Empress of China (2011)
- The Chalk Circle
- Dai Lo and Dai Lo: The lives and Times of Ho Tung and Chou Shouson

== Recognition and awards ==
- 1993 Honoree, An All-Star Salute to Chinese-American Cultural Pioneers, City Hall, New York City
- July 9, 1993 and July 9, 2013 named Joanna Chan Day in the City of New York
- November 11, 2017 designated as “Dr. Joanna Chan’s Day” by the New York State Senate
- 2017 Dynamic Achiever's Award, OCA Westchester & Hudson Valley

=== Papers ===
Her papers are at Columbia University.

As of 2019, MI Design in Hong Kong had published Chan's works in an eight volume series.

== Personal life ==
She is fluent in English, Mandarin, and Cantonese.

By 2016, Chan was living at the Maryknoll main house in Ossining, New York.
