= Abner Carroll Binder =

American journalist

Abner Carroll Binder (February 20, 1896, Mechanicsburg, Pennsylvania – 1956) was an American journalist. Binder was a graduate of the University of Pennsylvania and Harvard University. He is best known for his contributions to journalism as a newspaper correspondent and editor for the Chicago Daily News and the Minneapolis Tribune. Binder married Dorothy Walton in 1920, and they had four children. He died of leukemia in 1956.

== Early life and education ==
A Mechanicsburg, Pennsylvania, native, Binder was born February 20, 1896. His mother died in 1899, and Binder was raised by family friends of the Quaker faith, which may have led to his service in the American Red Cross's American Friends Service Committee later in his life. He attended the York Academy preparatory school. Binder's tertiary education was at the University of Pennsylvania, and then at Harvard University, where he graduated cum laude with degrees in philosophy and social ethics.

== Career in journalism ==
Binder began his newspaper career covering labor issues. He helped launch the Minnesota Daily Star, a paper organized by labor unions and non-partisan league farmers. Throughout 1920 he wrote for the Courier News in Fargo, North Dakota and for the Federated Press, a co-operative, labor oriented news gathering association. He eventually joined the Chicago Daily News in 1922 to cover industrial and labor news. After several years at the Daily News, he became a foreign correspondent, covering stories in Latin America, Europe and Russia. He returned to Chicago to work as the editorial assistant to Frank Knox, publisher of the Daily News. He then became the director of the newspaper's foreign service.

In 1945, Binder left the Chicago Daily News to become an editor at the Minneapolis Tribune, and began his career as a visiting foreign affairs lecturer at universities. He often appeared on radio as a commentator and in 1952 contributed a particularly popular segment to Edward R. Murrow's This I Believe radio program.

== Personal life ==
Binder married Dorothy Walton, whom he met while serving the Red Cross, in 1920 and had four children.
