= East China Normal University =

Public university in Shanghai, China

Coordinates: 31°13′41″N 121°24′00″E

- 华东师范大学
- Former name: Kwang Hua University
- Motto: 求实创造，为人师表
- Motto in English: Pursue what we have not been taught, and practice what we are going to teach
- Type: Public university
- Established: 1951; 75 years ago
- Affiliations: AALAU; Yangtze Delta Universities Alliance
- President: Xuhong Qian
- Students: 32,000
- Location: Shanghai, China
- Campus: North Zhongshan Rd. Campus (1072.25 acres) Minhang Campus (2071.53 acres)
- Colors: Ecnu red
- Mascot: ECNU Lions
- Website: ecnu.edu.cn

Chinese name
- Simplified Chinese: 华东师范大学
- Traditional Chinese: 華東師範大學
Transcriptions
Standard Mandarin
- Hanyu Pinyin: Huádōng Shīfàn Dàxué

East China Normal University (ECNU) is a public university in Shanghai, China. It is affiliated with the Ministry of Education and co-funded with the Shanghai Municipal People's Government. The university is part of Project 211, Project 985, and the Double First-Class Construction.

It was formed in 1951 by the merger of the Great China University (est. 1924) and Kwang Hua University (est. 1925) and originated from the St. John's College founded in 1879. As of 2020, ECNU is organized into 22 schools, colleges, and institutes, located in two campuses throughout Minhang and Putuo.

== History ==
Qun Xian Tang in North Zhongshan Road Campus, built in 1929, meaning "a place where talents and scholars assemble".

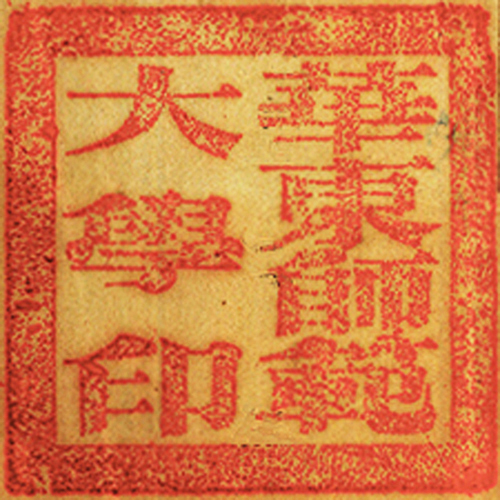
Former Seal of ECNU.

=== Origins ===
East China Normal University traces its roots to the formation of St. John's College (later to become St. John's University) in 1879, and its heritage has had a deep influence in the development of Chinese modern higher education.

In 1879, St. John's College was founded by William Jones Boone and Joseph Schereschewsky, Bishop of Shanghai, by combining two pre-existing Anglican colleges in Shanghai. In 1905, the college became St. John's University and was registered in Washington D.C. in the United States. It was the first institution to grant bachelor's degrees in China, starting in 1907.

After the May Thirtieth Movement in 1925, some academics and students left St. John's University, later forming the private Kwang Hua University to support the labor and anti-imperialist movement during the middle period of the Republic of China era.

In 1924, after a student protest at Xiamen University in Fujian, some academics fled north to Shanghai, where they established what became the Great China University (also known as Daxia University).

=== Establishment of the university ===
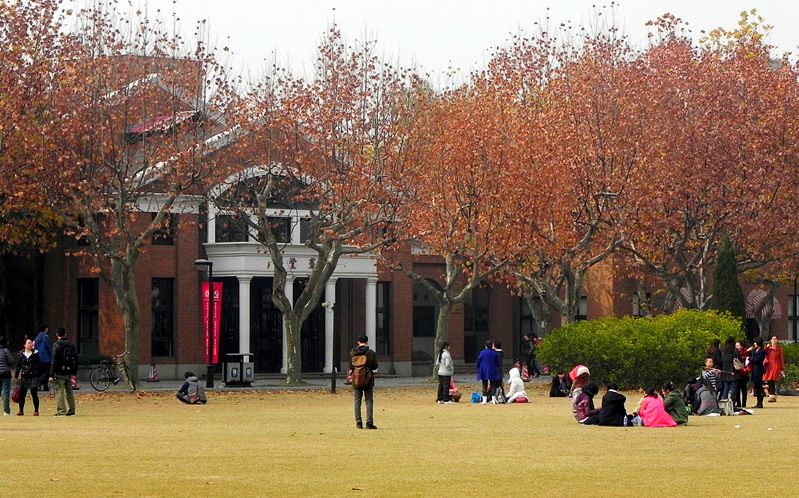
Siqun Auditorium built in 1946, named in memory of Wang Boqun, former president of the Great China University and the first Minister of Communications.

After the founding of the People's Republic of China, East China Normal University was officially formed in 1951 by the merger of the Great China University and Kwang Hua University, and was joined at the same time by a number of faculty members from Fudan University, Tongji University, University of Shanghai, and East China PE Academy, making it the first national teacher's training university of the People's Republic of China. This was done in part due to the government's desire to pool these institutions' resources into a single, stronger entity, cultivate talents with professional knowledge, and promote the development of education in the country.

In the 1950s, the Chinese government regrouped the country's higher education institutions in an attempt to build a Soviet-style system. Under this policy, most of the faculties from Saint John's University, Zhejiang University, University of Shanghai, Utopia University, and Aurora University were incorporated into ECNU to form a comprehensive multi-disciplinary university. Some of the academics at Tongji University and Jiaotong University were also transferred to ECNU.

In March 1959, ECNU was authenticated as one of the first 16 National Key Universities in China, and this status was reaffirmed in 1978. From 1972 to 1980 (during the Cultural Revolution in mainland China), five schools including ECNU were merged to create Shanghai Normal University, and in 1980 its original name was resumed.

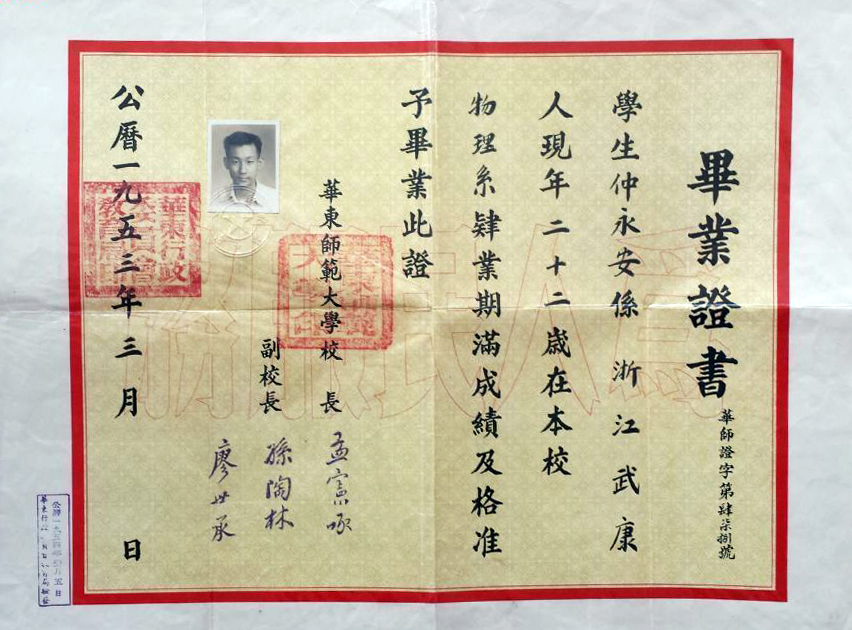
Diploma of East China Normal University, 1953.

=== 1980 to present ===
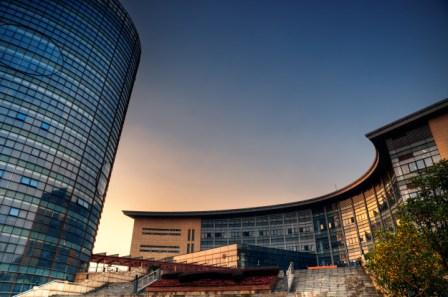
University Library, Minhang Campus.

In June 1986, ECNU was one of the first 33 higher education institutions authorized by the State Council to establish their graduate schools. In 1996, ECNU passed the prerequisites appraisal and became one of universities sponsored by the major national program Project 211. In 2006, the Ministry of Education and Shanghai Municipality signed into a partnership for co-sponsoring the development of the university, qualifying ECNU as a member of the Project 985.

ECNU is now under the direct auspices of the Ministry of Education. The university sponsors or supervises publication of more than 20 academic journals and periodicals. The library collection exceeds 4,000,000 volumes. 25 primary or secondary schools are affiliated to the university.

== International partnerships ==
The university has established strategic cooperative partnerships with universities such as École Normale Supérieure and its group in France, the University of Pennsylvania and Cornell University in USA, Tokyo University and Kobe University in Japan, and the University of Melbourne in Australia, the University of Warwick in the UK. It has been carrying out academic exchanges with over 150 universities and institutions in Great Britain, France, Germany, Japan, the United States, Canada, Australia, Korea, and Russia, etc. ECNU plays host to a CIEE satellite campus, where 100 American college students study each semester. The university also runs an Online College of the Chinese language in collaboration with the National Office for Teaching Chinese as a Foreign Language (NOCFL), which is the first of its kind to be established in the country, with over 5,800 students in 137 countries and regions. In 2008, it set up the NOCFL Study and Training Base for International Chinese Teachers.

- In 2002 the Ecole Normale Supérieure in Paris, the École normale supérieure de Cachan, and the École normale supérieure de Lyon set up a Master's-PhD programme at East China Normal University in Shanghai. An ENS campus is housed in the ECNU at the Aspiring Researchers Institute and at the Franco-Chinese Advanced Studies Institute.
- In 2007, the EMLYON Business School opened the official EMLYON Asia Campus in the heart of the ECNU campus.
- In 2008, the Cornell-ECNU Center for Comparative Culture was jointly funded by Cornell University and ECNU.
- China's first Sino-American university – New York University Shanghai (NYU Shanghai) – was co-established by New York University and ECNU and was approved by the Ministry of Education in early 2011.

=== Study China Programme ===
Along with several other Chinese universities, East China Normal University has hosted the United Kingdom (UK) government-funded Study China Programme for a number of years. In this programme, students from UK institutions spend one to two summer months studying Mandarin Chinese and Chinese culture at a university in China. The programme is organised by the University of Manchester and is fully funded by UK government bodies, such as the Department of Business, Innovation and Skills. Its purpose is to strengthen ties between UK university students and China, in particular as relatively few British students enroll in degrees in China. The programme has increased relations between ECNU and numerous leading UK universities.

=== Diplomats' Program ===
Sponsored by Shanghai Municipal Education Commission and Shanghai Foreign Affairs Office, the Diplomats' Program has been organized by ECNU since 2011. In this program, consular officials from over 20 countries spend two months during summer studying at East China Normal University.

== Research ==
University Auditorium.

=== State key laboratories ===
- State Key Laboratory of Estuarine and Coastal Research
- State Key Laboratory of Precision Spectroscopy

=== Key laboratories of provincial level and ministerial level ===
- Key Laboratory of Brain Functional Genomics, Ministry of Education
- Key Laboratory of Geography-Information Science, Ministry of Education
- Shanghai Institute of Brain Functional Genomics
- Shanghai Key Laboratory of Regulatory Biology
- Shanghai Key Laboratory of Green Chemistry and Green Chemical Process
- Shanghai Key Laboratory of Urbanization and Ecological Restoration
- Shanghai Key Laboratory of Trustworthy Computing

=== Key research bases in humanities and social science ===
- Institute of Curriculum and Instruction
- Institute of Modern Chinese Thought and Culture
- Center for Russian Studies
- Center for the Study of Chinese Characters and Their Applications
- Institute of Schooling Reform and Development
- Center for Modern Chinese City Studies

=== Joint Research Centre ===
- Cornell-ECNU Center for Comparative Culture
- KUL-ECNU Sino-Euro Culture Research Center
- ECNU-UBC Joint Research Core Group on China in Modern World
- Intercultural Education and Communication Research Center (with Humboldt University of Berlin)

== Rankings and reputation ==
University rankings
BCUR National	Domestic	30
Wu Shulian National	Domestic	33
CUAA National	Alumni	25
QS National	General	26
THE National	General	20–24
QS Asia (Asia version)	General	111
THE Asia (Asia version)	General	56
ARWU World	Research	201–300
QS World	General	=433
THE World	General	=242
USNWR World	General	=230

ECNU has always been ranked the top two among the mainland Chinese universities in Education and Training according to the most recent QS World University Rankings by Subjects and Academic Ranking of World Universities by Subjects.

In 2026, it was ranked 46th globally in the Times Higher Education Rankings by Subjects in "Education", which is historical strengths of the university as suggested in the name "Normal". East China Normal graduates employability rankings placed at # 151-200 in the world in the 2017 QS Graduate Employability Rankings. Globally, East China Normal University is regarded as a competitive university with a good reputation Chinese universities by the Times Higher Education World Reputation Rankings where it ranked 151-175th.

== Notable people ==
=== Alumni ===
==== Writers ====
- Chen Danyan: Writer
- Dai Houying: Writer
- Ge Fei: Writer, Professor of literature at Tsinghua University
- Mu Shiying: Writer

==== Academics ====
- Yu Lizhong: Chancellor of New York University Shanghai
- Wang Xingyu: President of East China University of Science and Technology (March 1994–July 2004)
- Xi Nanhua: Academician of the Chinese Academy of Sciences. Vice-President of University of Chinese Academy of Sciences
- Liu Boli: Academician of the Chinese Academy of Engineering
- Stephen Cheng: Academician of the National Academy of Engineering, United States
- Joe Z. Tsien: Neuroscientist, Georgia Health Sciences University
- He Jifeng: Academician of the Chinese Academy of Sciences and academic at ECNU
- Yuan Zhongyi: Archaeologist, praised as "the father of the Terracotta Warriors"

==== Politics ====
- Han Zheng: Vice President of China, Vice Premier of China, Member of the 19th Politburo Standing Committee
- He Xian: Vice Minister of the Ministry of Personnel of the P.R.China
- Chen Hao: Governor of Yunnan, China
- Yin Yicui: Chairwoman of the Shanghai People's Congress
- Li Yuanchao

==== Business and media ====
- Daniela Anahi Bessia: Celebrity performer for the China Central Television, Hunan Television, Shanghai Media Group, etc. | Culture and Entertainment
- Jason Jiang: Founder of Focus Media
- Dong Qing: Television host

==== Sport ====
- Liu Xiang: Gold medalist of 110-meter hurdles in the 2004 Summer Olympics

==== Study abroad ====
- Glenn Duffie Shriver: From Grand Valley State University, he did a study abroad program at ECNU.

=== Notable faculty members ===
- Meng Xiancheng: Educator, the first president of East China Normal University.
- Li Linsi: Educator and diplomat who has been recognized as one of the key figures in modern Chinese cultural and diplomatic history.
- Shen Zhihua: Professor of history at ECNU, expert in the history of the Soviet Union, Sino-Soviet relations, and the Cold War.
- Lü Simian: Chinese historian, former professor of history at ECNU.
- Shi Zhecun: Author, former professor of Chinese Language and Literature.
- Hu Huanyong: Demographer, forefather of modern Chinese demography and the founder of China's population geography.
- He Jifeng: Computer scientist, member of the Chinese Academy of Sciences.
- Ghil'ad Zuckermann: Linguist, revivalist.

=== Alumni associations ===
- East China Normal University Alumni Association
- East China Normal University Alumni Association in US
- East China Normal University Alumni Association in North California

== See also ==
- No. 1 High School Affiliated to East China Normal University
- No. 2 High School Attached to East China Normal University
- East China Normal University Press
