= Aloïsius Édouard Camille Gaultier =

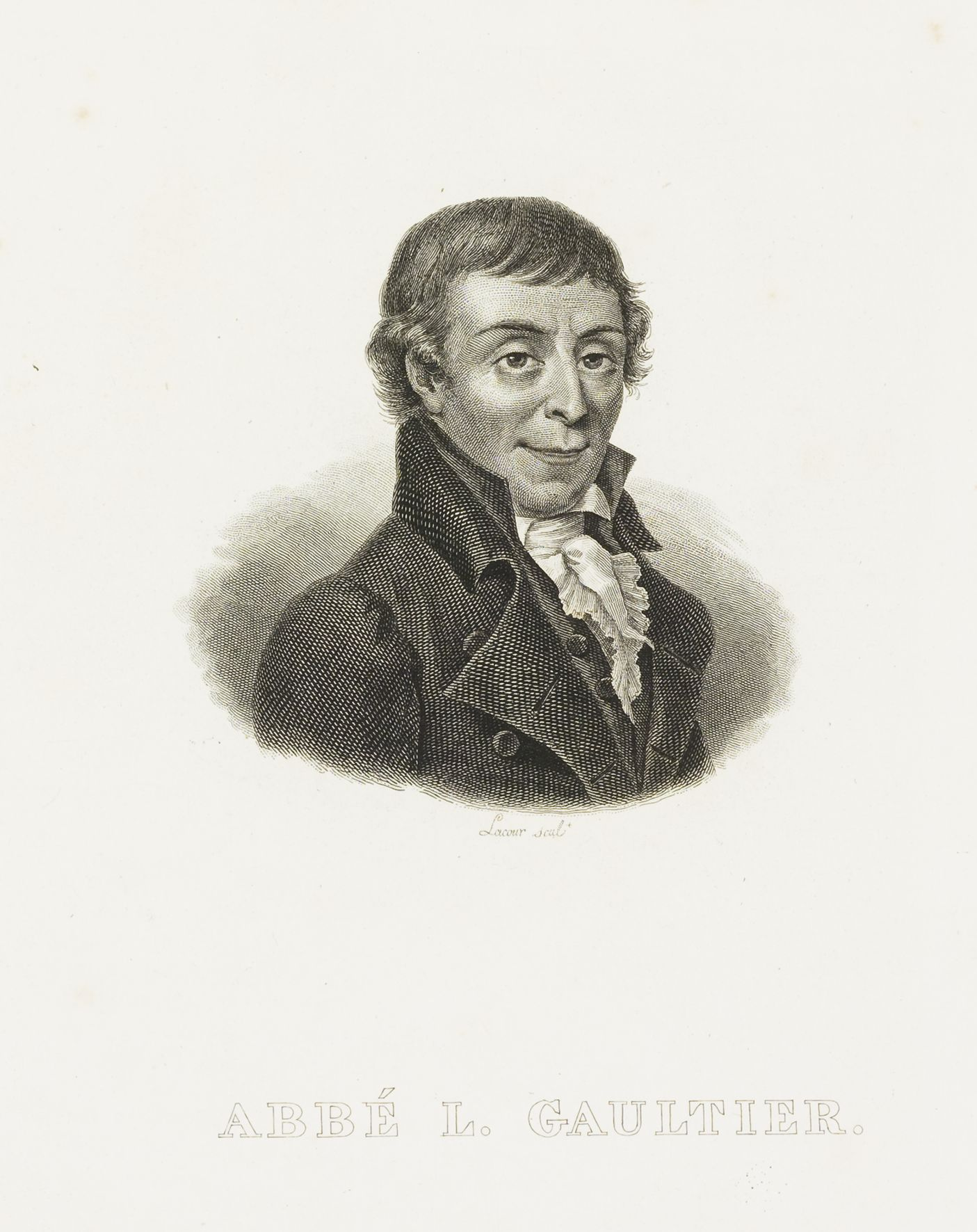
Louis Gaultier

Abbé Aloïsius Édouard Camille Gaultier (Asti, 1745 or 1746 - Paris, 19 September 1818) was a French Roman Catholic priest and educational reformer. In 1792 he left France during the worst of the Revolution, passing via Holland to England where he set up a school for the children of other refugees.

Leçons de grammaire en action (1819)

He was a pioneer in getting children to learn through amusing them and was made a member of the commission for the reorganization of public instruction. He wrote a large number of books, such as Géographie de l'abbé Gaultier, that became popular as instructional books in Nineteenth Century France. He is buried in Pere Lachaise cemetery (Division 22), in Paris.
