= Institute of Current World Affairs =

American foundation

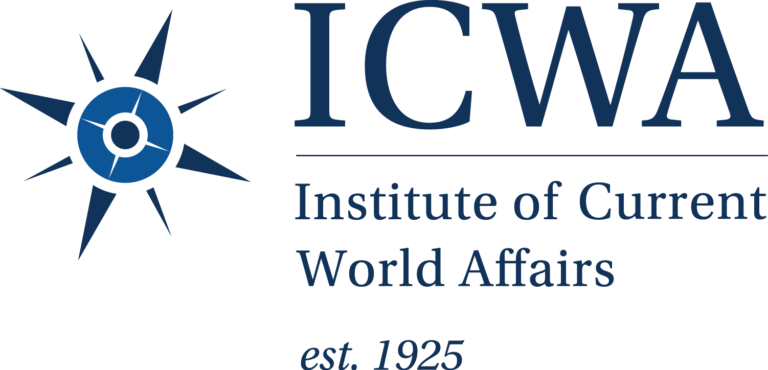
- Formation: 1925
- Type: Private foundation
- Headquarters: Washington, D.C., U.S.
- Website: www.icwa.org

The Institute of Current World Affairs (ICWA) is an operating foundation established in 1925 by US industrial heir and magnate Charles Richard Crane to advance American understanding of international cultures and affairs by sending young professionals abroad to study countries, regions and globally important issues. Institute alumni include leading journalists, scholars, diplomats, activists and businesspeople.

ICWA says it selects its fellows from a diverse group of young professionals for two years of cultural immersion in locations around the globe. Fellows explore their topics through self-designed and fully funded programs of study, thought and writing. They record their research and analysis in monthly dispatches.

While in the field, fellows receive support and mentoring from ICWA staff, former fellows and ICWA members with expertise in fellowship areas.

Former fellows credit the immersion experience of an ICWA fellowship, free from deadlines and career pressures, with enabling them to cultivate their talent and engage with their subject in ways that have a profound impact.

The Institute of Current World Affairs is recognized as a tax-exempt organization under Section 501(c)(3) of the Internal Revenue Code.

== History ==
The Institute of Current World Affairs supports fellowships for promising young people to gain in-depth understanding of global affairs from a local perspective. ICWA says it chooses candidates with the potential to make substantial contributions to public life in the United States.

The institute, which pays living expenses for fellows and their families, has sent more than 170 people abroad through its fellowship program.

In addition to publishing fellows' dispatches on its website, ICWA also offers analysis and commentary on global news and other developments. It also produces two podcasts: The Cable, which addresses threats to democracy in Europe and the transatlantic relationship, and From the Field, which takes listeners around the world with ICWA fellows studying cultures and societies in depth. In October 2020, ICWA launched a partnership with U.S. online magazine Slate to offer select fellow dispatches for publication.

== Alumni ==
The Institute of Current World Affairs has supported individuals who go on to notable careers that leverage the expertise learned during the fellowship, especially in the fields of journalism, academia and public service.

The work of the Institute's fellows has appeared in numerous national publications, including The New York Times, the Washington Post, Bloomberg Businessweek, The New Yorker, and elsewhere. Fellows have published dozens of books and appeared across media outlets as country experts.

The fellowships are credited with launching the careers of notable writers, leaders and foreign policy experts, including:

- Julie Barlow, Canadian journalist, author, and conference speaker
- David Binder, British-born American journalist, author, and lecturer
- L. Carl Brown, professor of Near Eastern studies emeritus, Princeton University
- Nancy Condee, professor, Department of Slavic Languages and Literatures, University of Pittsburgh
- William Fulbright Foote, CEO and founder of Root Capital, a nonprofit organization operating in poor rural areas of Africa, Latin America, and Southeast Asia
- Thomas Goltz, American author and journalist who covered conflicts in the Caucasus region during the 1990s
- Suzy Hansen, journalist in Turkey from 2007 to 2009 for The New York Times, author, Notes on a Foreign Country, 2018 Pulitzer Prize finalist
- Smith Hempstone, former U.S. ambassador to Kenya and former editor-in-chief, The Washington Times
- Pramila Jayapal (India, 1994–1996), civil rights activist and U.S. Representative
- Cheng Li (China, 1993–1995), author, Rediscovering China: Dynamics and Dilemmas of Reform, director, John L. Thornton China Center, and senior fellow at Brookings Institution
- Ann Mische, sociologist and associate professor of sociology at University of Notre Dame and professor of peace studies at the Kroc Institute for International Peace Studies
- Paul Anthony Rahe, American classicist, historian, writer and professor of history at Hillsdale College, and previously at Cornell University, Franklin and Marshall College, University of Tulsa, and Yale University
- Carol Rose (South and Central Asia, 1990–1993), executive director of the American Civil Liberties Union in Massachusetts
- Nicolas Schmidle, writer, The New Yorker and fellow in Pakistan who wrote a January 2008 article for The New York Times Magazine, "Next Gen Taliban" He was deported by Pakistan's government the day after the article appeared.
- Jeffrey Steingarten, food critic at Vogue, National Magazine Award and James Beard award winner, author, The Man Who Ate Everything and It Must've Been Something I Ate, which was named food book of the year by the British Guild of Food Writers and awarded the 1998 Julia Child Book Award for literary food writing.
- Susan Sterner, Brazil, (1998–2000), documented First Lady Laura Bush as a White House photographer
- Phillips Talbot, former U.S. Department of State assistant secretary of state for Near Eastern and South Asian affairs
- Andrew Weil, physician and alternative medicine advocate, including the 4-7-8 breathing technique

== Current Fellows ==
Current Fellows
Astha Rajvanshi (India, 2020–2022)
Elizabeth Hawkins (El Salvador, 2019–2021)
Emily Schultheis (Germany, 2019–2021)
David Kenner (Saudi Arabia, 2019–2021)

== Recent Past Fellows ==
Recent Past Fellows
Matthew Chitwood (China, 2017–2019)
Karina Piser (France, 2017–2019)
Onyinye Edeh (Nigeria, 2016–2018)
Jessica Reilly (Seafaring, 2015–2017)
Jonathan Guyer (Egypt, 2015–2017)
Scott Erich (Oman, 2015–2016)
Malia Politzer (India/Spain, 2013–2015)
Robbie Corey-Boulet (Ivory Coast/Cameroon, 2013–2015)
Chi-Chi Zhang (China, 2012–2014)
Shannon Sims (Brazil, 2012–2014, Forest and Society Fellow)
Amelia Frank-Vitale (Mexico, 2012–2014)
Hannah Armstrong (West Africa, 2012–2014)
Neri Zilber (Israel, 2010–2012)
Jori Lewis (West Africa, 2011–2013)
Eve Fairbanks (South Africa, 2009–2011)
Derek Mitchell (India, 2007–2009)
Ezra Fieser (Guatemala, 2008–2010)
Pooja Bhatia (Haiti, 2008–2010)
Elena Agarkova (Russia, 2008–2010)
Raphael Soifer (Brazil, 2007–2009)
Suzy Hansen (Turkey, 2007–2009)
Nicholas Schmidle (Pakistan, 2006–2008)
Andrew Tabler (Syria/Lebanon, 2005–2007)
Kay Dilday (France/Morocco, 2005–2007)
Richard Connerney (India, 2005–2007)
Jill Winder (Germany, 2004–2006)
Cristina Merrill (Romania, 2004–2006)
Alex Brenner (China, 2003–2005)
James Workman (Southern Africa, 2002–2004)
Matthew Wheeler (Mekong River, 2002–2004)
Andrew Rice (Uganda, 2002–2004)
Martha J. Farmelo (Argentina, 2001–2003)
Leena Khan (Pakistan, 2001–2002)
Peter Keller (Argentina, 2000–2002, Forest and Society Fellow)
Curt Gabrielson (East Timor, 2000–2002)
Gregory Feifer (Russia, 2000–2002)
Wendy L. Call (Mesoamerica, 2000–2002)

== Current ICWA Board of Trustees ==
Current ICWA Board of Trustees
Joseph Battat (Vice Chair)
Mary Lynne Bird
Jeffrey Gedmin
Camila Gonzalez
Fabrice Houdart
Peggy Knudson
Robert A. Levinson
Michael Mathison (Treasurer)
Joel Millman
Jeffrey Race
Paul Rahe (Chair)
Mary Rusinow
Pascal Saura
Dirk Vandewalle
Chi-Chi Zhang (Secretary)
Peter Bird Martin (Honorary Trustee)
Edmund Sutton (Honorary Trustee)
