= Julie Barlow =

Canadian journalist, author and conference speaker

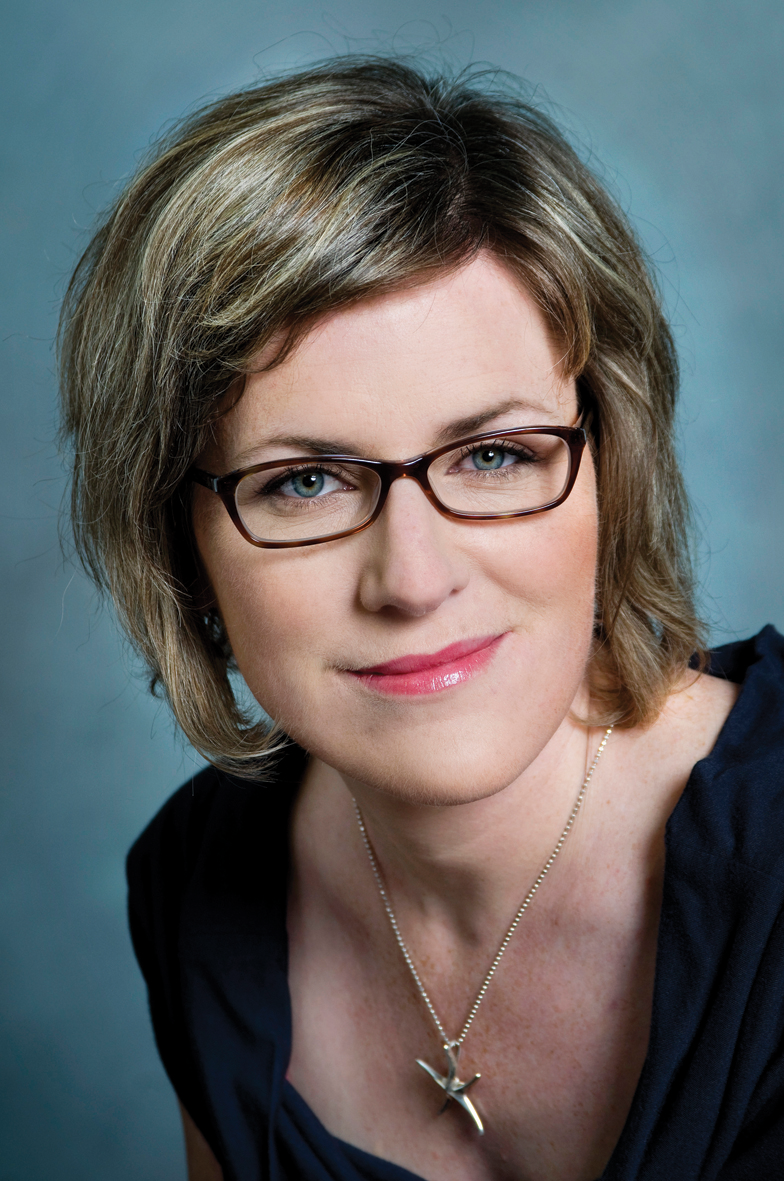
Julie Barlow

Julie Barlow (March 1968 in Hamilton, Ontario) is a Canadian journalist, author and conference speaker who writes and publishes both in English and French and is based in Montreal, Quebec.

As an author, she has written four books on language and culture, among which are Sixty Million Frenchmen Can't Be Wrong and The Bonjour Effect.

Originally from Hamilton, Ontario, she has written features for a wide variety of magazines and newspapers including USA Today, L’actualité, The New York Times and The Christian Science Monitor.

== Biography ==
Julie Barlow received a bachelor's degree from McGill University where she majored in political science. She received a master's degree in English literature from Concordia University.

After living in Paris, France from 1999 to 2001, she co-wrote Sixty Million Frenchmen Can't Be Wrong (St. Martin's Press, 2003) with her husband Jean-Benoît Nadeau, a book about France and French culture. The book was translated into French, Dutch and Chinese.

In 2006, Barlow co-wrote The Story of French with Nadeau, a biography of the origins of the French language.

This book was translated into French and Japanese. In 2014, it was adapted into a two-hour radio documentary, Le français n’a pas dit son dernier mot (French has not said its last word), which was broadcast by France Culture in July 2014, and still available in podcast.

Barlow was a visiting Fulbright scholar at the North American Center for Transborder Studies in Phoenix, Arizona, in spring 2010 where her studies focused on relations between Mexico and the United States and the role of Spanish in the U.S. This was part of the research for her next book, a history of the Spanish language titled The Story of Spanish (St. Martin's Press), also co-authored with Nadeau.

As of 2016, she sits on the board of trustees of the Washington-based Institute of Current World Affairs.

In 2018, she was a finalist for the CBC/QWF writer in residence program.

== Awards ==
- 2011 L’Académie des Science d’Outre-Mer (The Academy of Overseas Sciences) Prix de la Renaissance Française (French Renaissance Award)
- 2007 Quebec Writer’s Federation Mavis Gallant Prize for Non-Fiction

== Published works ==
- 2016: The Bonjour Effect: The Secret Codes of French Conversation Revealed (with Jean-Benoît Nadeau)
- 2013: The Story of Spanish (with Jean-Benoît Nadeau). New York: Saint Martin's Press.
- 2006: The Story of French (with Jean-Benoît Nadeau). New York: Saint Martin's Press.
- 2006: Montréal & Québec City for Dummies (with Austin Macdonald). Dummies Travel series. (2nd ed. 2016) New York John Wiley.
- 2003: Sixty Million Frenchmen Can't Be Wrong (with Jean-Benoît Nadeau). Naperville: Sourcebooks.
