= Onyeama =

- Gender: Male
- Language(s): Igbo

Origin
- Word/name: Nigeria
- Meaning: God fearing

Onyeama audio is a Nigerian surname of Igbo origin.

== Notable people with the surname include ==
- Charles Onyeama (1917–1999), Nigerian politician
- Dillibe Onyeama (1951–2022), Nigerian author and publisher
- Geoffrey Onyeama (born 1956), Nigerian politician

== See also ==
- Onyema
