= List of international trips made by John Kerry as United States Secretary of State =

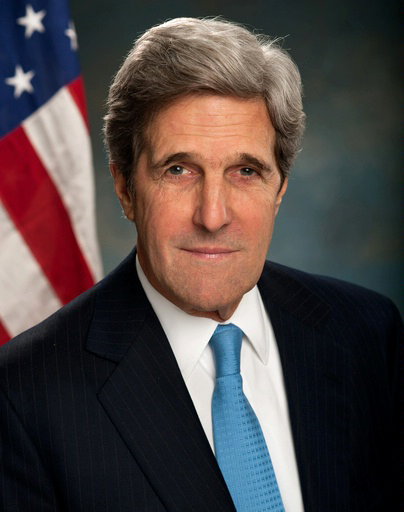
Official portrait of John Kerry as Secretary of State, 2013

This is a list of international visits undertaken by John Kerry (in office 2013–2017) while serving as the 68th United States secretary of state. The list includes both private travel and official state visits. The list includes only foreign travel which he made during his tenure in the position.

== Summary ==
Kerry visited 91 countries. The number of visits per country or territory where Secretary Kerry traveled are:

- One visit to Angola, Antarctica, Australia, Bahrain, Bangladesh, Bulgaria, Cambodia, Chile, Congo, Cyprus, Denmark, Djibouti, Dominican Republic, Greece, Greenland, Guatemala, Haiti, Kazakhstan, Kosovo, Kyrgyzstan, Lebanon, Lithuania, Luxembourg, Mexico, Moldova, Mongolia, Netherlands, New Zealand, Norway, Rwanda, Serbia, Singapore, Solomon Islands, Somalia, South Sudan, Spain, Sri Lanka, Sweden, Tajikistan, Turkmenistan and Uzbekistan
- Two visits to Brazil, Brunei, Cuba, Ethiopia, Georgia, Ireland, Kazakhstan, Kuwait, Laos, Malaysia, Morocco, Myanmar, Pakistan, Panama, Peru, Philippines and Tunisia
- Three visits to Colombia, Indonesia, Japan, Nigeria, Oman, Poland, Qatar, South Korea, Ukraine and Vatican City
- Four visits to Canada, India, Iraq and Vietnam
- Five visits to Afghanistan and Russia
- Six visits to Turkey
- Seven visits to United Arab Emirates
- Nine visits to China
- Ten visits to Austria
- Eleven visits to Egypt and Germany
- Twelve visits to Belgium, Italy and the Palestinian National Authority
- Thirteen visits to Israel
- Fifteen visits to Jordan
- Seventeen visits to Saudi Arabia
- Twenty visits to Switzerland
- Twenty-nine visits to the United Kingdom
- Thirty-four visits to France

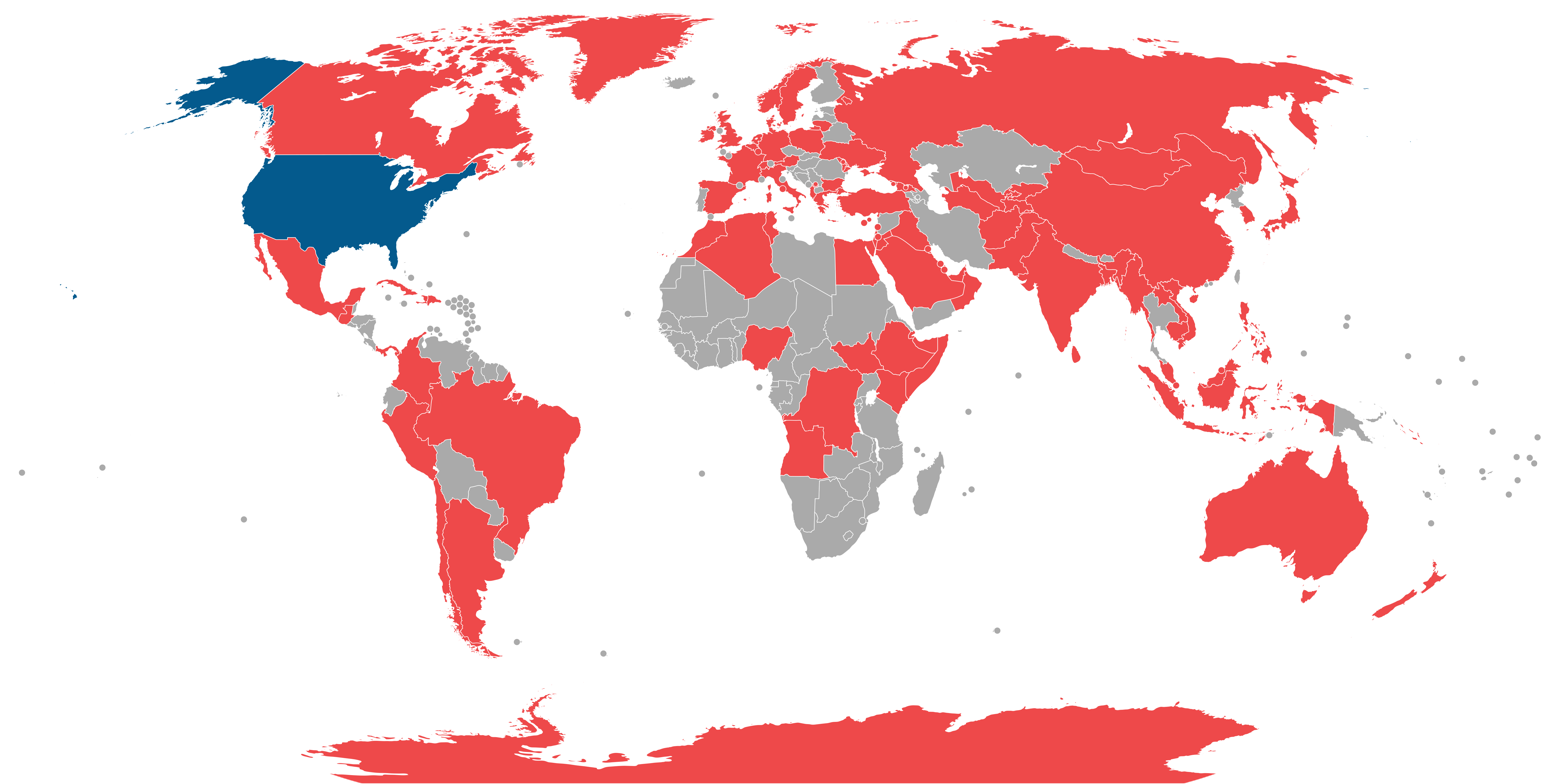
World map highlighting countries visited by John Kerry as Secretary of State, 2013–2017: United States Countries visited No visits

== Table ==
	Country	Locations	Details	Dates	Images
1	United Kingdom	London	Met with Prime Minister David Cameron and Foreign Secretary William Hague.	February 25–26, 2013	Secretary Kerry with British Prime Minister David Cameron in London, February 2013
1	Germany	Berlin	Met with Foreign Minister Guido Westerwelle, Chancellor Angela Merkel, and Russian Foreign Minister Sergey Lavrov.	February 26–27, 2013	Secretary Kerry with German Chancellor Angela Merkel in Berlin, February 2013
1	France	Paris	Met with President François Hollande and Foreign Minister Laurent Fabius. Discussed the situation in Mali.	February 27, 2013	Secretary Kerry with French President François Hollande in Paris, February 2013
1	Italy	Rome	Met with Prime Minister Mario Monti, Foreign Minister Giulio Terzi di Sant'Agata, NATO Secretary General Anders Fogh Rasmussen, and the Foreign Ministers of the Baltic States. Also attended an Ad Hoc Meeting on Syria with Syrian Opposition leaders.	February 27 – March 1, 2013	Secretary Kerry with Italian Prime Minister Mario Monti in Rome, March 2013
1	Turkey	Ankara	Met with President Abdullah Gül, Prime Minister Recep Tayyip Erdoğan, and Foreign Minister Ahmet Davutoğlu. Discussed the Syrian crisis.	March 1–2, 2013	Secretary Kerry with Turkish Foreign Minister Ahmet Davutoğlu in Ankara, March 2013
1	Egypt	Cairo	Met with Arab League Secretary General Nabil al-Araby, Foreign Minister Mohamed Kamel Amr, President Mohammed Morsi, Defense Minister Abdul Fatah al-Sisi, and Egyptian political and business leaders.	March 2–3, 2013	Secretary Kerry with Egyptian President Mohammed Morsi in Cairo, March 2013
1	Saudi Arabia	Riyadh	Met with the Gulf Cooperation Council Foreign Ministers and with Foreign Minister Prince Saud al-Faisal.	March 3–4, 2013	Secretary Kerry with Saudi Foreign Minister Prince Saud al-Faisal in Riyadh, March 2013
1	United Arab Emirates	Abu Dhabi	Met with Crown Prince Mohamed bin Zayed al-Nahyan and Foreign Minister Abdullah bin Zayed al-Nahyan.	March 4–5, 2013	Secretary Kerry with UAE Crown Prince Mohamed bin Zayed al-Nahyan in Abu Dhabi, March 2013
1	Qatar	Doha	Met with Emir Hamad bin Khalifa al-Thani, Heir Apparent Tamim bin Hammad al-Thani, and Prime Minister/Foreign Minister Hamad bin Jassin bin Jaber al-Thani.	March 5–6, 2013	
1	Ireland	Shannon	Met with Foreign Affairs Minister Eamon Gilmore while returning to the United States.	March 6, 2013	
2	Israel	Jerusalem	Accompanied President Obama.	March 20–22, 2013	Secretary Kerry with Israeli Prime Minister Benjamin Netanyahu in Jerusalem, March 2013
2	Palestinian National Authority	Ramallah; Bethlehem	Accompanied President Obama.	March 21, 2013	Secretary Kerry with President Obama and Palestinian Authority President Mahmoud Abbas in Bethlehem, March 2013
2	Jordan	Amman	Accompanied President Obama.	March 22–24, 2013	Secretary Kerry with Palestinian Authority President Mahmoud Abbas in Amman, March 2013
2	Iraq	Baghdad	Met with Prime Minister Nouri al-Maliki and Iraqi political leaders.	March 24–25, 2013	Secretary Kerry over Baghdad, March 2013
2	Afghanistan	Kabul	Met with President Hamid Karzai.	March 25–26, 2013	Secretary Kerry with Afghan President Hamid Karzai in Kabul, March 2013
2	France	Paris	Met with Foreign Minister Laurent Fabius and addressed French business leaders.	March 26–27, 2013	Secretary Kerry with French Foreign Minister Laurent Fabius in Paris, March 2013
3	Turkey	Istanbul	Met with Foreign Minister Ahmet Davutoğlu.	April 7, 2013	Secretary Kerry with Turkish Foreign Minister Ahmet Davutoğlu in Istanbul, April 2013
3	Israel	Jerusalem, Tel Aviv	Met with President Shimon Peres, Prime Minister Benjamin Netanyahu, and Palestinian Authority Prime Minister Salam Fayyad.	April 7–9, 2013	Secretary Kerry with Israeli President Shimon Peres in Jerusalem, April 2013
3	Palestinian National Authority	Ramallah	Met with President Mahmoud Abbas.	April 7, 2013	Secretary Kerry with Palestinian Authority President Mahmoud Abbas in Ramallah, April 2013
4	United Kingdom	London	Attended the G-8 Foreign Ministers Meeting.	April 10–11, 2013	Secretary Kerry with G8 Foreign Ministers in London, April 2013
4	South Korea	Seoul	Met with President Park Geun-hye and Prime Minister Yun Byung-se. Addressed the American Chamber of Commerce.	April 12–13, 2013	Secretary Kerry with South Korean President Park Geun-hye in Seoul, April 2013
4	China	Beijing	Met with President & CCP General Secretary Xi Jinping, Premier Li Keqiang, and Foreign Minister Wang Yi.	April 13–14, 2013	Secretary Kerry with Chinese leader Xi Jinping in Beijing, April 2013
4	Japan	Tokyo	Met with Foreign Minister Fumio Kishida.	April 14, 2013	Secretary Kerry with Japanese Foreign Minister Fumio Kishida in Tokyo, April 2013
5	Turkey	Istanbul	Met with Foreign Minister Ahmet Davutoğlu and attended a ministerial meeting of the Friends of the Syrian People Core Group. Also met with Palestinian Authority President Mahmoud Abbas and Ecumenical Patriarch Bartholomew.	April 20–21, 2013	Secretary Kerry with Turkish Foreign Minister Ahmet Davutoğlu in Istanbul, April 2013
5	Belgium	Brussels	Attended a NATO Foreign Minister's Meeting. Also attended a NATO–Russia Council Ministerial meeting. Signed agreement with Lithuania on countering nuclear smuggling. Met with Afghan President Hamid Karzai and Pakistani General Ashfaq Kayani.	April 21–24, 2013	Secretary Kerry with NATO Foreign Ministers in Brussels, April 2013
6	Russia	Moscow	Met with President Vladimir Putin and Foreign Minister Sergey Lavrov.	May 7–8, 2013	Secretary Kerry with Russian Foreign Minister in Moscow, May 2013
6	Italy	Rome	Met with Foreign Minister Emma Bonino, Jordanian Foreign Minister Nasser Judeh, and Israeli Justice Minister Tzipi Livni.	May 8–9, 2013	Secretary Kerry with Italian Foreign Minister Emma Bonino in Rome, May 2013
7	Sweden	Stockholm, Kiruna	Met with Prime Minister Fredrik Reinfeldt and Foreign Minister Carl Bildt. Attended the Arctic Council Ministerial Meeting at Kiruna.	May 14–15, 2013	Secretary Kerry with Swedish Prime Minister Fredrik Reinfeldt in Stockholm, May 2013
8	Oman	Muscat	Met with Sultan Qaboos bin Said al Said and Defense Minister Said Badr al-Busaidi.	May 21–22, 2013	Secretary Kerry with Omani Sultan Qaboos bin Said al Said in Muscat, May 2013
8	Jordan	Amman	Met with King Abdullah II and Foreign Minister Nasser Judeh. Attended a London Eleven plenary meeting.	May 22, 2013	Secretary Kerry participates in the London Eleven Ministerial Meeting in Amman, May 2013
8	Israel	Jerusalem; Tel Aviv	Met with Prime Minister Benjamin Netanyahu and President Shimon Peres.	May 23–24, 2013	Secretary Kerry with Israeli President Shimon Peres in Tel Aviv, May 2013
8	Palestinian National Authority	Ramallah	Met with President Mahmoud Abbas.	May 23–24, 2013	Secretary Kerry with Palestinian Authority President Mahmoud Abbas in Ramallah, May 2013
8	Ethiopia	Addis Ababa	Attended the African Union Summit and commemorated the Golden Jubilee of the Organization of African Unity.	May 24–26, 2013	Secretary Kerry with Ethiopian Prime Minister Hailemariam Dessalegn in Addis Ababa, May 2013
8	Jordan	Amman	Attended the World Economic Forum.	May 26–27, 2013	Secretary Kerry at the World Economic Forum in Amman, May 2013
8	France	Paris	Met with French Foreign Minister Laurent Fabius and Russian Foreign Minister Sergey Lavrov.	May 27–28, 2013	Secretary Kerry with Russian Foreign Minister Sergey Lavrov in Paris, May 2013
9	Guatemala	Antigua	Attended the OAS General Assembly.	June 4–5, 2013	Secretary Kerry participates in the OAS General Assembly in Antigua, June 2013
10	Qatar	Doha	Attended the London Eleven Plenary Meeting and met with Heir Apparent Sheikh Tamin al-Thani, Prime Minister/Foreign Minister Sheikh Hamad al-Thani and Amir Hamad al-Thani.	June 22–23, 2013	Secretary Kerry with Qatari Amir Hamad al-Thani in Doha, June 2013
10	India	New Delhi	Attended the Fourth Annual U.S.–India Strategic Dialogue and the Second U.S.–India Education Dialogue.	June 23–25, 2013	Secretary Kerry with Indiana External Affairs Minister Salman Khurshid in New Delhi, June 2013
10	Saudi Arabia	Jeddah	Met with Foreign Minister Prince Saud al-Faisal.	June 25–26, 2013	Secretary Kerry with Saudi Foreign Minister Prince Saud al-Faisal in Jeddah, June 2013
10	Kuwait	Kuwait City	Met with Amir Sheikh Sabah al-Ahmed al-Sabah and Deputy Prime Minister/Foreign Minister Sheikh Sabah Khalid al-Sabah.	June 26, 2013	Secretary Kerry with Kuwaiti Amir Sheikh Sabah al-Ahmed al-Sabah in Kuwait City, June 2013
10	Jordan	Amman	Met with King Abdullah II and Palestinian Authority President Mahmoud Abbas.	June 27, 2013	Secretary Kerry with King Abdullah of Jordon in Amman, June 2013
10	Israel	Jerusalem	Met with Prime Minister Benjamin Netanyahu.	June 27–30, 2013	Secretary Kerry with Israeli Prime Minister Benjamin Netanyahu in Jerusalem, June 2013
10	Palestinian National Authority	Ramallah	Met with President Mahmoud Abbas.	June 28, 2013	
10	Jordan	Amman	Met with King Abdullah II and Palestinian Authority President Mahmoud Abbas.	June 29, 2013	Secretary Kerry with Palestinian Authority Mahmoud Abbas in Amman, June 2013
10	Palestinian National Authority	Ramallah	Met with President Mahmoud Abbas.	June 30, 2013	Secretary Kerry with Palestinian Authority Mahmoud Abbas in Ramallah, June 2013
10	Brunei	Bandar Seri Begawan	Attended the ASEAN–U.S. Ministerial, Lower Mekong Initiative and Friends of the Lower Mekong Ministerial Meetings, the 20th ASEAN Regional Forum, and the 3rd East Asia Summit Foreign Ministers Meeting.	June 30 – July 2, 2013	Secretary Kerry participates in an ASEAN-U.S. Ministerial in Bandar Seri Begawan, July 2013
11	Jordan	Amman	Met with Foreign Minister Nasser Judeh and Palestinian Authority President Mahmoud Abbas. Attended an Arab League Peace Initiative Meeting. Visited the Za'atari Refugee Camp.	July 16–19, 2013	Secretary Kerry with Jordanian Foreign Minister Nasser Judeh in Amman, July 2013
11	Palestinian National Authority	Ramallah	Met with President Mahmoud Abbas and chief negotiator Saeb Erekat.	July 19, 2013	Secretary Kerry with Palestinian Authority President Mahmoud Abbas in Ramallah, July 2013
12	Pakistan	Islamabad	Met with President Asif Zardari, Prime Minister Nawaz Sharif, National Security Adviser Sartaj Aziz. Visited Zero Point Power Plant.	July 31 – August 2, 2013	Secretary Kerry with Pakistani President Asif Zardari in Islamabad, August 2013
12	United Kingdom	London	Met with United Arab Emirates Foreign Minister Abdullah bin Zayed.	August 2, 2013	Secretary Kerry with UAE Foreign Minister Abdullah bin Zayed in London, August 2013
13	Colombia	Bogotá	Met with President Juan Manuel Santos, Foreign Minister María Ángela Holguín, Defense Minister Juan Carlos Pinzón, and Colombian Peace Negotiators.	August 12–13, 2013	Secretary Kerry with Colombian President Juan Manuel Santos in Bogotá, August 2013
13	Brazil	Brasília	Met with President Dilma Rousseff, Foreign Minister Antonio Patriota, and Education Minister Aloizio Mercadante.	August 13, 2013	Secretary Kerry with Brazilian President Dilma Rousseff in Brasília, August 2013
14	Lithuania	Vilnius	Met with the EU Foreign Ministers and with Lithuanian President Dalia Grybauskaitė and Foreign Minister Linas Linkevičius.	September 7, 2013	Secretary Kerry with Lithuanian President Dalia Grybauskaitė in Vilnius, September 2013
14	France	Paris	Met with Foreign Minister Laurent Fabius and the Ministerial Delegation of the Arab Peace Initiative.	September 7–8, 2013	Secretary Kerry with French Foreign Minister Laurent Fabius in Paris, September 2013
14	United Kingdom	London	Met with Palestinian Authority President Mahmoud Abbas and with Foreign Secretary William Hague.	September 8–9, 2013	Secretary Kerry with British Foreign Secretary William Hague in London, September 2013
15	Switzerland	Geneva	Discussed the Syrian crisis with Russian Foreign Minister Sergey Lavrov. Announced Framework for the Elimination of Syrian Chemical Weapons.	September 12–15, 2013	Secretary Kerry with Russian Foreign Minister Sergey Lavrov in Geneva, September 2013
15	Israel	Jerusalem	Met with Prime Minister Benjamin Netanyahu.	September 15–16, 2013	Secretary Kerry with Israeli Prime Minister Benjamin Netanyahu in Jerusalem, September 2013
15	France	Paris	Met with President François Hollande, Foreign Minister Laurent Fabius, British Foreign Secretary William Hague, Turkish Foreign Minister Ahmet Davutoğlu, and Saudi Foreign Minister Saud al-Faisal.	September 16, 2013	Secretary Kerry with French Foreign Minister Laurent Fabius and British Foreign Secretary William Hague in Paris, September 2013
16	Japan	Tokyo	Attended the U.S.–Japan Security Consultative Committee meeting. Signed Protocol to amend the Guam International Agreement concerning redeployment of U.S. forces from Okinawa to Guam.	October 2–4, 2013	Secretary Kerry and Defense Secretary Hagel with Japanese Prime Minister Shinzo Abe and their counterparts in Tokyo, October 2013
16	Indonesia	Bali	Attended the APEC Ministerial Meeting and the APEC CEO Summit Meeting. Signed Nuclear Risk Reduction Agreement with Russian Foreign Minister Sergey Lavrov.	October 4–9, 2013	Secretary Kerry with APEC Leaders in Bali, October 2013
16	Brunei	Bandar Seri Begawan	Attended the U.S.–ASEAN Summit Meeting	October 9–10, 2013	Secretary Kerry participates in the U.S.–ASEAN Summit Meeting in Bandar Seri Begawan, October 2013
16	Malaysia	Kuala Lumpur	Attended the Fourth Global Entrepreneurship Summit.	October 10–11, 2013	Secretary Kerry with Malaysian Prime Minister Najib Razak in Kuala Lumpur, October 2013
16	Afghanistan	Kabul	Met with President Hamid Karzai. Signed Bilateral Security Agreement.	October 11–12, 2013	Secretary Kerry with Afghan President Hamid Karzai in Kabul, October 2013
16	United Kingdom	London	Met with EU High Representative Catherine Ashton. Addressed the AIPAC National Summit by satellite. Also met with UN Special Representative for Syria Lakhdar Brahimi.	October 12–14, 2013	
17	France	Paris	Met with members of the Arab Peace Initiative Follow-up Committee, Saudi Foreign Minister Saud al-Faisal, Foreign Minister Laurent Fabius, and members of the Syrian Opposition Coalition.	October 21–22, 2013	Secretary Kerry with Qatari Foreign Minister Khalid al-Attiyah in Paris, October 2013
17	United Kingdom	London	Attended the London Eleven Ministerial Meeting.	October 22, 2013	Secretary Kerry participates in the London Eleven Ministerial Meeting in London, October 2013
17	Italy	Rome	Met with Prime Minister Enrico Letta and Israeli Prime Minister Benjamin Netanyahu.	October 22–24, 2013	Secretary Kerry with Italian Prime Minister Enrico Letta in Rome, October 2013
18	Egypt	Cairo	Met with Interim President Adly Mansour, Foreign Minister Nabil Fahmy, and Defense Minister Abdul Fatah al-Sisi.	November 3, 2013	Secretary Kerry with Egyptian Foreign Minister Nabil Fahmy in Cario, October 2013
18	Saudi Arabia	Riyadh	Met with Foreign Minister Saud al-Faisal and King Abdullah bin Abdulaziz al-Saud.	November 3–4, 2013	Secretary Kerry with Saudi Foreign Minister Saud al-Faisal in Riyadh, November 2013
18	Poland	Warsaw, Łask	Wreath-laying at the grave of former Prime Minister Tadeusz Mazowiecki. Met with Prime Minister Donald Tusk and Foreign Minister Radosław Sikorski. Medal award ceremony at Łask Air Base.	November 4–5, 2013	Secretary Kerry with Polish Prime Minister Donald Tusk in Warsay, November 2013
18	Israel	Tel Aviv, Jerusalem	Wreath-laying ceremony at the Yitzhak Rabin Memorial. Met with President Shimon Peres and Prime Minister Benjamin Netanyahu.	November 5–7, 2013	Secretary Kerry and Israeli President Shimon Peres in Jerusalem, November 2013
18	Palestinian National Authority	Bethlehem	Met with President Mahmoud Abbas and attended a High Impact Microfinance Infrastructure Initiative Event.	November 6, 2013	Secretary Kerry with Palestinian Authority President in Bethlehem, November 2013
18	Jordan	Amman	Met with King Abdullah II, Foreign Minister Nasser Judeh, and Palestinian Authority President Mahmoud Abbas.	November 6, 2013	Secretary Kerry with King Abdullah II of Jordan in Amman, November 2013
18	Israel	Tel Aviv	Met with Prime Minister Benjamin Netanyahu.	November 8, 2013	
18	Switzerland	Geneva	Met with EU High Representative Catherine Ashton, French Foreign Minister Laurent Fabius, and Iranian Foreign Minister Javad Zarif.	November 8–10, 2013	Secretary Kerry with EU High Representative Catherine Ashton and Iranian Foreign Minister Mohammad Javad Zarif in Geneva, November 2013
18	United Arab Emirates	Abu Dhabi	Met with Crown Prince Mohammed bin Zayed al-Nahyan and Foreign Minister Abdullah bin Zayed al-Nahyan.	November 10–11, 2013	Secretary Kerry with UAE Foreign Minister Abdullah bin Zayed al-Nahyan in Abu Dhabi, November 2013
19	Switzerland	Geneva	Met with the P5+1 representatives and Iranian Foreign Minister Mohammed Zarif. Announced a First Step Agreement on Iran's Nuclear Program.	November 22–24, 2013	Secretary Kerry with P5+1 representatives and Iranian Foreign Minister Mohammad Javad Zarif in Geneva, November 2013
19	United Kingdom	London	Met with Foreign Secretary William Hague and Libyan Prime Minister Ali Zeidan.	November 24–25, 2013	Secretary Kerry with British Foreign Secretary William Hague and Libyan Prime Minister Ali Zeidan in London, November 2013
20	Belgium	Brussels	Attended the NATO Foreign Ministers' Meeting and a NATO–Russia Council Meeting. Signed Cyber Partnership Agreement with Estonia.	December 3–4, 2013	Secretary Kerry with NATO Foreign Ministers in Brussels, December 2013
20	Moldova	Chișinău	Met with President Nicolae Timofti and Prime Minister Iurie Leancă. Attended a Trade and Investment Showcast.	December 4, 2013	Secretary Kerry with Moldovan Prime Minister Iurie Leancă in Chișinău, December 2013
20	Israel	Jerusalem, Tel Aviv	Met with Prime Minister Benjamin Netanyahu and Finance Minister Yair Lapid.	December 5–6, 2013	Secretary Kerry with Israeli Prime Minister Benjamin Netanyahu in Jerusalem, December 2013
20	Palestinian National Authority	Ramallah	Met with President Mahmoud Abbas.	December 5, 2013	Secretary Kerry with Palestinian Authority President Mahmoud Abbas in Ramallah, December 2013
21	Israel	Jerusalem, Tel Aviv	Met with Prime Minister Benjamin Netanyahu.	December 12–13, 2013	Secretary Kerry with Israeli Prime Minister Benjamin Netanyahu in Jerusalem, December 2013
21	Vietnam	Ho Chi Minh City, Cà Mau, Hanoi	Met with American and Vietnamese business leaders, addressed the American Chamber of Commerce, delivered an address on climate change, and met with Foreign Minister Phạm Bình Minh.	December 14–17, 2013	Secretary Kerry with Vietnamese Foreign Minister Phạm Bình Minh in Hanoi, December 2013
21	Philippines	Manila, Tacloban	Met with President Benigno Aquino and Foreign Secretary Albert del Rosario. Visited a USAID Forward Operating Base.	December 17–18, 2013	Secretary Kerry with Filipino President Benigno Aquino in Manila, December 2013
22	Israel	Jerusalem	Met with Prime Minister Benjamin Netanyahu and Foreign Minister Avigdor Lieberman.	January 2–5, 2014	Secretary Kerry with Israeli Prime Minister Benjamin Netanyahu in Jerusalem, January 2014
22	Palestinian National Authority	Ramallah	Met with President Mahmoud Abbas.	January 3–4, 2014	Secretary Kerry with Palestinian Authority President Mahmoud Abbas in Ramallah, January 2014
22	Jordan	Amman	Met with King Abdullah II.	January 5, 2014	Secretary Kerry with King Abdullah II of Jordan in Amman, January 2014
22	Saudi Arabia	Riyadh	Met with King Abdullah bin Abdulaziz al-Said.	January 5–6, 2014	Secretary Kerry with Saudi King Abdullah bin Abdulaziz al-Said in Riyadh, January 2014
23	France	Paris	Attended the London 11 Ministerial Meeting and the Arab Peace Initiative Follow-up Committee Meeting. Met with Russian Foreign Minister Sergey Lavrov.	January 12–14, 2014	Secretary Kerry participates in the London Eleven Ministerial Meeting in Paris, January 2014
23	Vatican City State	Vatican City	Met with Secretary of State Pietro Parolin.	January 14, 2014	Secretary Kerry with Secretary of State Pietro Parolin in Vatican City, January 2014
23	Kuwait	Kuwait City	Attended the Syria Donors' Conference.	January 14–15, 2014	Secretary Kerry participates in the Syria Donors' Conferenc in Kuwait City, January 2014
24	Switzerland	Montreux, Davos	Attended the World Economic Forum.	January 23–24, 2014	Secretary Kerry at the World Economic Forum in Davos, January 2014
25	Germany	Berlin, Munich	Met with Chancellor Angela Merkel and Foreign Minister Frank-Walter Steinmeier. Attended the 50th Munich Security Conference.	January 31 – February 2, 2014	Secretary Kerry with German Chancellor Angela Merkel in Berlin, January 2014
26	South Korea	Seoul	Met with President Park Geun-hye and Foreign Minister Yun Byung-se.	February 13–14, 2014	Secretary Kerry with South Korean President Park Geun-hye in Seoul, February 2014
26	China	Beijing	Met with President & CCP General Secretary Xi Jinping, Foreign Minister Wang Yi, and Premier Li Keqiang. Visited a joint venture plant.	February 14–15, 2014	Secretary Kerry with Chinese leader Xi Jinping in Beijing, February 2014
26	Indonesia	Jakarta	Met with ASEAN Secretary-General Lê Lương Minh, Foreign Minister Marty Natalegawa. Delivered an address on climate change. Attended a Joint Commission meeting. Signed Memoranda of Understanding on South-South Triangular Cooperation and Wildlife trafficking.	February 16–17, 2014	Secretary Kerry with Indonesian Foreign Minister Marty Natalegawa in Jakarta, February 2014
26	United Arab Emirates	Abu Dhabi	Met with Crown Prince Mohammed bin Zayed al-Nahyan and Foreign Minister Abdullah bin Zayed al-Nahyan.	February 17–18, 2014	
26	Tunisia	Tunis	Met with President Moncef Marzouki and Prime Minister Mehdi Jomaa.	February 18–19, 2014	Secretary Kerry with Tunisian President President Moncef Marzouki in Tunis, February 2014
26	France	Paris	Met with Foreign Minister Laurent Fabius, Palestinian Authority President Mahmoud Abbas, and Jordanian Foreign Minister Nasser Judeh.	February 19–20, 2014	Secretary Kerry with French Foreign Minister Laurent Fabius in Paris, February 2014
27	Ukraine	Kyiv	Met with Acting President Oleksandr Turchynov, Prime Minister Arseniy Yatsenyuk, and political and religious leaders.	March 4, 2014	Secretary Kerry with Ukrainian Acting President Oleksandr Turchynov in Kyiv, March 2014
27	France	Paris	Attended the Budapest Memorandum Ministerial Meeting and a meeting of the International Support Group for Lebanon.	March 5, 2014	Secretary Kerry with French Foreign Minister Laurent Fabius in Paris, March 2014
27	Italy	Rome	Met with Prime Minister Matteo Renzi and Foreign Minister Federica Mogherini. Attended a conference on International Support to Libya.	March 5–6, 2014	Secretary Kerry with Italian Matteo Renzi in Rome, March 2014
27	Jordan	Aqaba	Met with King Abdullah II.	March 7, 2014	
28	United Kingdom	London	Discussed the Ukrainian crisis with Russian Foreign Minister Sergey Lavrov.	March 14, 2014	Secretary Kerry with Russian Foreign Minister Sergey Lavrov in London, March 2014
29	Netherlands	The Hague	Accompanied President Obama to a G-7 Leaders' Meeting on the Ukrainian crisis.	March 24–25, 2014	Secretary Kerry with Dutch Foreign Minister Frans Timmermans in The Hague, March 2014
29	Italy	Rome	Accompanied President Obama.	March 25, 2014	
29	Vatican City State	Vatican City	Accompanied President Obama.	March 25, 2014	Secretary Kerry with President Obama at the Vatican City, March 2014
29	Jordan	Amman	Met with King Abdullah II and Palestinian Authority President Mahmoud Abbas.	March 26, 2014	Secretary Kerry with Palestinian Authority President Mahmoud Abbas in Amman, March 2014
29	Italy	Rome	Accompanied President Obama.	March 27–28, 2014	Secretary Kerry with President Obama in Rome, March 2014
29	Saudi Arabia	Riyadh	Accompanied President Obama.	March 28–29, 2014	
29	France	Paris	Met with Foreign Minister Laurent Fabius and Russian Foreign Minister Sergey Lavrov.	March 29–30, 2014	Secretary Kerry with French Foreign Minister Laurent Fabius in Paris, March 2014
29	Israel	Jerusalem	Met with Prime Minister Benjamin Netanyahu.	March 31 – April 1, 2014	Secretary Kerry with Israeli Prime Minister Benjamin Netanyahu in Jerusalem, March 2014
29	Palestinian National Authority	Ramallah	Met with President Mahmoud Abbas.	March 31, 2014	
29	Belgium	Brussels	Attended the NATO Foreign Ministerial Meeting and meetings of the NATO–Ukraine and NATO–Georgia Commissions. Co-chaired the 5th U.S.–EU Energy Council Meeting.	April 1–2, 2014	Secretary Kerry with NATO Foreign Ministers in Brussels, April 2014
29	Algeria	Algiers	Co-chaired the U.S.–Algeria Strategic Dialogue.	April 3, 2014	Secretary Kerry with Algerian Foreign Minister Ramtane Lamamra in Algiers, April 2014
29	Morocco	Rabat, Casablanca	Co-chaired the U.S.–Morocco Strategic Dialogue.	April 3–4, 2014	Secretary Kerry with Moroccan Foreign Minister Salaheddine Mezouar in Rabat, April 2014
30	Switzerland	Geneva	Discussed the Ukrainian crisis with representatives of Russia, Ukraine, and the European Union. Discussed the Syrian crisis with Joint Special Representative Lakhdar Brahimi.	April 16–17, 2014	Secretary Kerry with EU High Representative Catherine Ashton in Geneva, April 2014
31	Ethiopia	Addis Ababa	Co-convened the 4th Session of the U.S.–AU High Level Dialogue. Met with Somali President Hassan Sheikh Mohamud.	April 30 – May 3, 2014	Secretary Kerry with Ethiopian Prime Minister Hailemariam Desalegn in Addis Ababa, May 2014
31	South Sudan	Juba	Met with President Salva Kiir, civil society leaders and UNMISS representatives.	May 2, 2014	Secretary Kerry with South Sudanese President Salva Kiir in Juba, May 2014
31	Congo, Democratic Republic of the	Kinshasa	Met with Foreign Minister Raymond Tshibanda, participants in the Young African Leaders Initiative UN Special Representative Martin Kobler, and President Joseph Kabila.	May 3–4, 2014	Secretary Kerry with Congolese President Joseph Kabila in Kinshasa, May 2014
31	Angola	Luanda	Met with President José Eduardo dos Santos and Foreign Minister Georges Chikoti. Visited a General Electric facility.	May 4–5, 2014	Secretary Kerry with Angolan President José Eduardo do Santos in Luanda, May 2014
32	United Kingdom	London	Attended a meeting of the London 11 (Friends of the Syrian People) and the Syrian Opposition Coalition.	May 15–16, 2014	Secretary Kerry participates in the London Eleven Ministerial Meeting in London, May 2014
33	Mexico	Mexico City	Met with President Enrique Peña Nieto and Foreign Secretary José Antonio Meade. Attended a Joint Bilateral Forum on Higher Education, Innovation, and Research; a CleanTech Challenge Launch event, and a U.S.–Mexico CEO Dialogue dinner.	May 21–22, 2014	Secretary Kerry with Mexican President Enrique Peña Nieto in Mexico City, May 2014
34	Poland	Warsaw	Accompanied President Obama. Signed a Framework Agreement on Innovation. Met with Ukrainian President-elect Petro Poroshenko.	June 3–4, 2014	Secretary Kerry with Polish Foreign Minister Radislow Sikorski in Wasaw, June 2014
34	Lebanon	Beirut	Met with Prime Minister Tammam Salam. Participated in a round-table with non-governmental organizations.	June 4, 2014	Secretary Kerry with Lebanese Prime Minister Tammam Salam in Beirut, June 2014
34	France	Paris, Normandy, Saint-Briac-sur-Mer	Accompanied President Obama. Took part in commemorations of the 70th anniversary of the Normandy invasion.	June 5–7, 2014	Secretary Kerry with President Obama at a ceremony marking the 70th anniversary of D-Day in Normandy, June 2014
35	United Kingdom	London	Attended the Global Summit to end Sexual Violence in Combat.	June 13, 2014	Secretary Kerry with British Foreign Secretary William Hague in London, June 2014
36	Egypt	Cairo	Met with President Abdel Fattah al-Sisi, Foreign Minister Sameh Shoukry, and Arab League Secretary-General Nabil al-Araby.	June 22, 2014	Secretary Kerry with Egyptian Foreign Minister Sameh Shoukry in Cairo, June 2014
36	Jordan	Amman	Met with Foreign Minister Nasser Judeh.	June 22, 2014	Secretary Kerry with Jordanian Foreign Minister Nasser Judeh in Amman, June 2014
36	Iraq	Baghdad, Erbil	Met with President Nouri al-Maliki and Iraqi political leaders, and with Kurdistan regional leaders in Erbil.	June 23–24, 2014	Secretary Kerry with Iraqi Prime Minister Nouri al-Maliki in Baghdad, June 2014
36	Belgium	Brussels	Attended a NATO Foreign Ministers' Meeting.	June 24–26, 2014	Secretary Kerry with NATO Foreign Ministers in Brussel, June 2014
36	France	Paris	Met with Foreign Minister Laurent Fabius and with the Foreign Ministers of Israel, Saudi Arabia, the United Arab Emirates, and Jordan.	June 26–27, 2014	Secretary Kerry with French Foreign Minister Laurent Fabius in Paris, June 2014
36	Saudi Arabia	Jeddah	Met with King Abdullah bin Abdulaziz al-Saud and Syrian Opposition Coalition President Ahmad Jarba.	June 27, 2014	Secretary Kerry with Saudi King Abdullah bin Abdulaziz al-Saud in Jeddah, June 2014
37	Panama	Panama City	Attended the inauguration of President Juan Carlos Varela Rodríguez. Met with the Presidents of El Salvador, Guatemala, and Honduras.	July 1, 2014	Secretary Kerry attends the inauguration of Panamanian President Juan Carlos Varela Rodríguez in Panama City, July 2014
38	China	Beijing	Attended the Sixth Round of the U.S.–China Strategic and Economic Dialogue.	July 8–10, 2014	Secretary Kerry with Chinese leader Xi Jinping in Beijing, July 2014
38	Afghanistan	Kabul	Met with President Hamid Karzai, Afghan political leaders, and the head of the UN Assistance Mission.	July 11–12, 2014	Secretary Kerry with Afghan President Hamid Karzai in Kabul, July 2014
38	Austria	Vienna	Met with Iranian Foreign Minister Javad Zarif and various P5+1 Foreign Ministers.	July 13–15, 2014	Secretary Kerry with Iranian Foreign Minister Mohammad Javad Zarif in Vienna, July 2014
39	Egypt	Cairo	Discussed the Gaza crisis with UN Secretary-General Ban Ki-moon, Arab League Secretary-General Nabil al-Araby, President Abdel Fattah al-Sisi, and Foreign Minister Sameh Shoukry.	July 21–23, 2014	Secretary Kerry with Egyptian President Abdel Fattah al-Sisi in Cairo, July 2014
39	Israel	Jerusalem, Tel Aviv	Met with UN Secretary-General Ban Ki-moon and Prime Minister Benjamin Netanyahu.	July 23, 2014	Secretary Kerry with Israeli Prime Minister Benjamin Netanyahu in Tel Aviv, July 2014
39	Palestinian National Authority	Ramallah	Met with President Mahmoud Abbas.	July 23, 2014	Secretary Kerry with Palestinian Authority President Mahmoud Abbas in Ramallah, July 2014
39	Egypt	Cairo	Discussed the Gaza crisis with UN Secretary-General Ban Ki-moon, Arab League Secretary-General Nabil al-Araby, President Abdel Fattah al-Sisi, and Foreign Minister Sameh Shoukry.	July 24–25, 2014	Secretary Kerry with Egyptian Foreign Minister Sameh Shoukry, Arab League Secretary-General Nabil al-Araby and UN Secretary-General Ban Ki-moon in Cairo, July 2014
39	France	Paris	Met with the Foreign Ministers of France, the United Kingdom, Germany, Italy, Qatar, and Turkey.	July 25–26, 2014	Secretary Kerry with the Foreign Ministers of Qatar, Turkey, France, United Kingdom, Germany and Italy in Paris, July 2014
40	India	New Delhi	Attended the 5th U.S.–India Strategic Dialogue.	July 29 – August 1, 2014	Secretary Kerry with Indian External Affairs Minister Sushma Swaraj in New Delhi, July 2014
41	Afghanistan	Kabul	Met with President Hamid Karzai and presidential candidates Abdullah Abdullah and Ashraf Ghani.	August 7–8, 2014	Secretary Kerry with Afghan presidential candidates Abdullah Abdullah and Ashraf Ghani in Kabul, August 2014
41	Myanmar	Naypyitaw, Rangoon	Attended the U.S.–ASEAN and Lower Mekong Initiatives, the ASEAN Regional Forum, and the East Asia Summit ministerial meetings.	August 9–10, 2014	Secretary Kerry participates in the ASEAN-U.S. Ministerial in Naypyitaw, August 2014
41	Australia	Sydney	Attended the Australia–U.S. Ministerial Consultations.	August 11–13, 2014	Secretary Kerry and Defense Secretary with Australian Governor General Peter Cosgrove, Foreign Minister Julie Bishop and Defense Minister David Johnston in Sydney, August 2014
41	Solomon Islands	Honiara	Met with Governor General Frank Kabui and Prime Minister Gordon Lilo. Attended wreath-laying ceremonies at the Guadalcanal American Memorial and the Solomons Scouts and Coastwatchers Memorial.	August 13, 2014	Secretary Kerry with Solomon Islands Prime Minister Gordon Lilo in Honiara, August 2014
42	United Kingdom	Newport, Cardiff	Accompanied President Obama to the NATO Summit Meeting.	September 4–5, 2014	Secretary Kerry with British Foreign Secretary Philip Hammond at the NATO summit in Newport, September 2014
43	Iraq	Baghdad	Met with President Fuad Masum, Prime Minister Haidar al-Abadi, Foreign Minister Ibrahim al-Jaafari, and Council of Representatives Speaker Salim al-Jabouri.	September 10, 2014	Secretary Kerry with Iraqi President Fuad Masum in Baghdad, September 2014
43	Jordan	Amman	Met with King Abdullah II.	September 10–11, 2014	
43	Saudi Arabia	Jeddah	Met with King Abdullah, attended a meeting of the Gulf Cooperation Council and Regional Partners, and met with representatives of the Organization of the Islamic Conference.	September 11–12, 2014	Secretary Kerry with Saudi King Abdullah in Jeddah, September 2014
43	Turkey	Ankara	Met with President Recep Tayyip Erdoğan, Prime Minister Ahmet Davutoğlu, and Foreign Minister Mevlüt Çavuşoğlu.	September 12–13, 2014	Secretary Kerry with Turkish Foreign Minister Mevlüt Çavuşoğlu in Ankara, September 2014
43	Egypt	Cairo	Met with President Abdel Fattah al-Sisi, Foreign Minister Sameh Shoukry, and Arab League Secretary-General Nabil al-Araby.	September 13–14, 2014	Secretary Kerry with Egyptian Foreign Minister Sameh Shoukry in Cairo, September 2014
43	France	Paris	Attended the International Conference on Peace and Security in Iraq.	September 14–15, 2014	
44	Egypt	Cairo	Attended the Gaza Donors Conference.	October 12–13, 2014	Secretary Kerry participates in the Gaza Donors Conference in Cairo, October 2014
44	France	Paris	Met with Foreign Minister Laurent Fabius, Russian Foreign Minister Sergey Lavrov, and Libyan Foreign Minister Mohammed al-Dairi.	October 13–14, 2014	Secretary Kerry with Russian Foreign Minister Sergey Lavrov in Paris, October 2014
44	Austria	Vienna	Trilateral meeting with EU High Representative Lady Catherine Ashton and Iranian Foreign Minister Javad Zarif.	October 15, 2014	
45	Indonesia	Jakarta	Attended the inauguration of President Joko Widodo.	October 20–21, 2014	Secretary Kerry attends the inauguration of Indonesian President Joko Widodo in Jakarta, October 2014
45	Germany	Berlin	Met with Chancellor Angela Merkel and Foreign Minister Frank-Walter Steinmeier.	October 21–22, 2014	
46	Canada	Ottawa	Met with Prime Minister Stephen Harper and Foreign Minister John Baird.	October 28, 2014	Secretary Kerry with Canadian Prime Minister Stephen Harper in Ottawa, October 2014
47	France	Paris	Met with Foreign Minister Laurent Fabius, Jordanian Foreign Minister Nasser Judeh and Quartet Representative Tony Blair.	November 4–6, 2014	Secretary Kerry with French Foreign Minister Laurent Fabius in Paris, October 2014
47	United Arab Emirates	Abu Dhabi	Met with Foreign Minister Abdullah bin Zayed al-Nahyan.	November 6, 2014	Secretary Kerry with UAE Foreign Minister Abdullah bin Zayed Al Nahyan in Abu Dhabi, October 2014
47	China	Beijing	Attended the APEC Ministerial Meeting.	November 7–8, 2014	Secretary Kerry participates in the APEC Ministerial Meeting in Beijing, November 2014
47	Oman	Muscat	Attended a trilateral meeting with EU High Representative Lady Catherine Ashton and Iranian Foreign Minister Javad Zarif.	November 9–11, 2014	Secretary Kerry with EU High Representative Catherine Ashton and Iranian Foreign Minister Mohammad Javad Zarif in Muscat, November 2014
47	China	Beijing	Accompanied President Obama.	November 11–12, 2014	Secretary Kerry with Chinese Vice Premier Zhang Gaoli in Beijing, November 2014
47	Jordan	Amman	Met with King Abdullah II, Foreign Minister Nasser Judeh, and Palestinian Authority President Mahmoud Abbas. Attended a bilateral meeting of King Abdullah II and Israeli Prime Minister Benjamin Netanyahu.	November 12–13, 2014	Secretary Kerry with King Abdullah of Jordon in Amman, November 2014
48	United Kingdom	London	Attended EU/P5+1 negotiations with Iran.	November 18–20, 2014	Secretary Kerry with British Foreign Secretary Philip Hammond in London, November 2014
48	France	Paris	Met with Saudi Foreign Minister Prince Saud and French Foreign Minister Laurent Fabius.	November 20, 2014	Secretary Kerry with French Foreign Minister Laurent Fabius in Paris, November 2014
48	Austria	Vienna	Attended meetings with the P5+1 representatives, EU High Representative Catherine Ashton, and Iranian Foreign Minister Zarif.	November 20–24, 2014	Secretary Kerry with P5+1 Foreign Ministers, EU High Representative Catherine Ashton and Iranian Mohammad Javad Zarif in Vienna, November 2014
49	Belgium	Brussels	Attended the NATO Foreign Ministers meeting, the first ministerial meeting of the Counter-ISIL Coalition, and the 6th U.S.–EU Energy Council meeting.	December 1–3, 2014	Secretary Kerry with NATO Foreign Ministers in Brussels, December 2014
49	Switzerland	Basel	Attended an OSCE Ministerial Meeting.	December 3–4, 2014	Secretary Kerry participates in the OSCE Ministerial Meeting in Basel, December 2014
49	United Kingdom	London	Attended the Conference on Afghanistan.	December 4–5, 2014	Secretary Kerry with British Foreign Secretary Philip Hammond in London, December 2014
50	Peru	Lima	Met with President Ollanta Humala Tasso and French Foreign Minister Laurent Fabius. Addressed the COP-20.	December 11, 2014	Secretary Kerry with Peruvian President Ollanta Humala Tasso in Lima, December 2014
50	Colombia	Bogotá	Met with President Juan Manuel Santos and Foreign Minister María Ángela Holguín.	December 12, 2014	Secretary Kerry with Colombian President Juan Manuel Santos in Bogotá, December 2014
50	Italy	Rome	Met with Russian Foreign Minister Sergey Lavrov and Israeli Prime Minister Benjamin Netanyahu.	December 14–15, 2014	Secretary Kerry with Russian Foreign Minister Sergey Lavrov in Rome, December 2014
50	France	Paris	Met with the EU3 Foreign Ministers.	December 15, 2014	
50	United Kingdom	London	Met with the Arab League Special Committee and with Quartet Representative Tony Blair.	December 16, 2014	
51	Germany	Munich	Met with Sultan Qaboos of Oman.	January 10, 2015	
51	India	Ahmedabad	Attended the Vibrant Gujarat Global Investors Summit.	January 11–12, 2015	Secretary Kerry with Indian Prime Minister Narendra Modi in Ahmedabad, January 2015
51	Pakistan	Islamabad	Attended the Second U.S.–Pakistan Strategic Dialogue Ministerial meeting.	January 12–14, 2015	Secretary Kerry with Pakistani Prime Minister Nawaz Sharif in Islamabad, January 2015
51	Switzerland	Geneva	Met with UN Special Envoy for Syria Staffan de Mistura and Iranian Foreign Minister Javad Zarif.	January 14, 2015	Secretary Kerry with Iranian Foreign Minister Mohammad Javad Zarif in Geneva, January 2015
51	Bulgaria	Sofia	Met with President Rosen Plevneliev, Prime Minister Boyko Borissov, Foreign Minister Daniel Mitov, and British Foreign Secretary Philip Hammond.	January 14–15, 2015	Secretary Kerry with Bulgarian Prime Minister Boyko Borissov in Sofia, January 2015
51	France	Paris	Met with President François Hollande, Foreign Minister Laurent Fabius, Mayor Anne Hidalgo, and Iranian Foreign Minister Javad Zarif.	January 16, 2015	Secretary Kerry with French President François Hollande in Paris, January 2015
52	United Kingdom	London	Attended a meeting of the Counter-ISIL Coalition Small Group and met with Foreign Secretary Philip Hammond.	January 22, 2015	Secretary Kerry with British Foreign Secretary Philip Hammond in London, January 2015
52	Switzerland	Davos	Attended the World Economic Forum.	January 22–24, 2015	Secretary Kerry at the World Economic Forum, January 2015
52	Nigeria	Lagos	Met with President Goodluck Jonathan and presidential candidate Muhammadu Buhari.	January 24–25, 2015	Secretary Kerry with Nigerian President Goodluck Jonathan in Lagos, January 2015
52	Switzerland	Geneva	Met with members of the U.S. Mission.	January 26, 2015	
52	Saudi Arabia	Riyadh	Accompanied President Obama to offer condolences to King Salman bin Abd al Aziz bin Saud after the passing of King Abdullah.	January 27, 2015	Secretary Kerry with Saudi King Salman in Riyadh, January 2015
53	Ukraine	Kyiv	Met with President Petro Poroshenko and Prime Minister Arseniy Yatsenyuk.	February 5–6, 2015	Secretary Kerry with Ukrainian President Petro Poroshenko in Kyiv, February 2015
53	Germany	München	Attended the 51st Munich Security Conference.	February 6–8, 2015	Secretary Kerry at the Munich Security Conference, February 2015
54	United Kingdom	London	Met with Foreign Secretary Philip Hammond.	February 21–22, 2015	Secretary Kerry with British Foreign Secretary Philip Hammond in London, February 2015
54	Switzerland	Geneva	Met with Iranian Foreign Minister Javad Zarif.	February 22–23, 2015	
55	Switzerland	Geneva, Montreux	Attended the 28th Session of the UN Human Rights Commission and met with Russian Foreign Minister Sergey Lavrov. Met with Iranian Foreign Minister Javad Zarif in Montreux.	March 2–4, 2015	Secretary Kerry with Iranian Foreign Minister Mohammad Javad Zarif in Montreux, March 2015
55	Saudi Arabia	Riyadh	Met with King Salman and Foreign Minister Saud al-Faisal and attended a meeting of Gulf Cooperation Council Foreign Ministers.	March 4–6, 2015	Secretary Kerry with Saudi Foreign Minister Saud al-Faisal in Riyadh, March 2015
55	United Kingdom	London	Met with Gulf Cooperation Council Foreign Ministers.	March 6, 2015	
55	France	Paris	Met with the Foreign Ministers of France, Germany, and the United Kingdom, and with EU High Representative Federica Mogherini.	March 7, 2015	Secretary Kerry with French Foreign Minister Laurent Fabius in Paris, March 2015
56	Egypt	Sharm El Sheikh	Attended the Egypt Economic Development Conference.	March 13–15, 2015	Secretary Kerry with Egyptian President Abdel Fattah al-Sisi in Sharm El Sheikh, March 2015
56	Switzerland	Lausanne	Attended the P5+1 negotiations with Iran.	March 15–21, 2015	
56	United Kingdom	London	Met with the Foreign Ministers of France, Germany, and the United Kingdom, and with EU High Representative Federica Mogherini.	March 21, 2015	
57	Switzerland	Lausanne	Attended the P5+1 negotiations with Iran.	March 27 – April 2, 2015	Secretary Kerry with P5+1 Foreign Ministers and Iranian Foreign Minister Mohammad Javad Zarif in Lausanne, April 2015
58	Panama	Panama City	Attended the Seventh Summit of the Americas.	April 9–10, 2015	Secretary Kerry with President Obama in Panama City, April 2015
59	Germany	Lübeck	Attended the G-7 Foreign Ministers Meeting.	April 14–15, 2015	Secretary Kerry with G7 Foreign Ministers in Lübeck, April 2015
60	Canada	Iqaluit	Attended the Arctic Council Ministerial meeting.	April 24, 2015	Secretary Kerry with Canadian Foreign Minister Rob Nicholson in Iqaluit, April 2015
61	Sri Lanka	Colombo	Met with President Maithripala Sirisena, Prime Minister Ranil Wickremesinghe, and Foreign Minister Mangala Samaraweera.	May 2–3, 2015	Secretary Kerry with Sri Lankan President Maithripala Sirisena in Colombo, May 2015
61	Kenya	Nairobi	Met with President Uhuru Kenyatta and Chief Justice Willy Mutunga. Visited the Dadaab refugee camp.	May 3–5, 2015	Secretary Kerry with Kenyan President Uhuru Kenyatta, May 2015
61	Somalia	Mogadishu	Met with President Hassan Sheikh Mohamud, Prime Minister Omar Abdirashid Ali Sharmarke and regional leaders. Announced plans to re-establish a U.S. Embassy.	May 5–6, 2015	Secretary Kerry with Somalian President Hassan Sheikh Mohamud, Prime Minister Omar Abdirashid Ali Sharmarke and regional leaders in Mogadishu, May 2015
61	Djibouti	Djibouti	Met with President Ismail Omar Guelleh and Foreign Minister Mahamoud Ali Youssouf.	May 6, 2015	Secretary Kerry with Djiboutian President Ismail Omar Guelleh in Djibouti, May 2015
61	Saudi Arabia	Riyadh	Met with King Salman, Crown Prince Mohammed bin Nayef, Foreign Minister Adel al-Jubeir, and Yemeni President Abd Rabbuh Mansur Hadi.	May 6–7, 2015	Secretary Kerry with Saudi King Salman in Riyadh, May 2015
61	France	Paris	Attended ceremonies commemorating the 70th anniversary of VE-Day, Met with Foreign Minister Laurent Fabius and with the Gulf Cooperation Council Foreign Ministers.	May 8, 2015	Secretary Kerry with French Foreign Minister Laurent Fabius in Paris, May 2015
62	Russia	Sochi	Met with President Vladimir Putin and Foreign Minister Sergey Lavrov.	May 12, 2015	Secretary Kerry with Russian President Vladimir Putin in Sochi, May 2015
62	Turkey	Antalya	Attended a NATO Foreign Ministers Meeting.	May 12–13, 2015	Secretary Kerry with Turkish Prime Minister Ahmet Davutoğlu in Antalya, May 2015
63	China	Beijing	Met with Foreign Minister Wang Yi, Premier Li Keqiang, State Counselor Yang Jiechi, and President & CCP General Secretary Xi Jinping.	May 16–17, 2015	Secretary Kerry with Chinese Premier Li Keqiang in Beijing, May 2015
63	South Korea	Seoul	Met with Foreign Minister Yun Byung-se and President Park Geun-hye.	May 17–18, 2015	
64	Nigeria	Abuja	Attended the inauguration of President Muhammadu Buhari.	May 29, 2015	Secretary Kerry attends the inauguration of Nigerian President Muhammad Buhari in Abuja, May 2015
64	Switzerland	Geneva	Met with Iranian Foreign Minister Mohammad Javad Zarif.	May 29–30, 2015	Secretary Kerry with Iranian Foreign Minister Mohammad Javad Zarif in Geneva, May 2015
65	Austria	Vienna	Met with Iranian Foreign Minister Mohammad Javad Zarif and the Foreign Ministers of the P5+1. Negotiated Joint Comprehensive Plan of Action concerning Iran's nuclear energy program.	June 26 – July 14, 2015	Secretary Kerry with P5+1 Foreign Ministers and Iranian Foreign Minister Mohammad Javad Zarif in Vienna, July 2015
66	Egypt	Cairo	Co-chaired U.S.–Egypt Strategic Dialogue.	August 2–3, 2015	
66	Qatar	Doha	Met with the Foreign Ministers of the Gulf Cooperation Council.	August 3, 2015	
66	Singapore	Singapore	Met with Prime Minister Lee Hsien Loong and Foreign Minister K. Shanmugam. Delivered an address at Singapore Management University.	August 4, 2015	
66	Malaysia	Kuala Lumpur	Attended the ASEAN Regional Forum.	August 4–6, 2015	Secretary Kerry with Japanese Foreign Minister Fumio Kishida in Kuala Lumpur, August 2015
66	Vietnam	Hanoi	Met with Deputy Prime Minister/Foreign Minister Phạm Bình Minh and commemorated the 20th anniversary of the establishment of diplomatic relations.	August 6–8, 2015	Secretary Kerry with Vietnamese Deputy Prime Minister and Foreign Minister Phạm Bình Minh in Hanoi, August 2015
67	Cuba	Havana	Formally inaugurated the U.S. Embassy. Met with Foreign Minister Bruno Eduardo Rodrigues Parilla.	August 14, 2015	Secretary Kerry with Cuban Foreign Minister Bruno Eduardo Rodriguez Parrilla in Havana, August 2015
68	United Kingdom	London	Met with Foreign Secretary Philip Hammond and UAE Foreign Minister Abdullah bin Zayed.	September 18–19, 2015	Secretary Kerry with British Foreign Secretary Philip Hammond in London, September 2015
68	Germany	Berlin	Met with Foreign Minister Frank-Walter Steinmeier.	September 20, 2015	Secretary Kerry with German Foreign Minister Frank-Walter Steinmeier in Berlin, September 2015
69	Chile	Valparaíso	Attended the second Our Ocean Conference.	October 5, 2015	Secretary Kerry with Chilean President Michelle Bachelet and Foreign Minister Heraldo Muñoz in Valparaíso, October 2015
69	Haiti	Port-au-Prince	Met with President Michel Martelly.	October 6, 2015	
70	Italy	Milan	Commemorated World Food Day, visited the USA Pavilion at Milan EXPO 2015, and met with Foreign Minister Paolo Gentiloni.	October 16–17, 2015	
70	France	Paris	Addressed the UNESCO Executive Board.	October 18, 2015	
70	Spain	Madrid	Met with King Felipe VI, Prime Minister Mariano Rajoy, and Foreign Minister José Manuel García-Margallo.	October 18–19, 2015	Secretary Kerry with Spanish Prime Minister Mariano Rajoy in Madrid, October 2015
71	Germany	Berlin	Met with Foreign Minister Frank-Walter Steinmeier, Israeli Prime Minister Benjamin Netanyahu, and EU High Representative Federica Mogherini.	October 22, 2015	Secretary Kerry with Israeli Prime Minister Benjamin Netanyahu in Berlin, October 2015
71	Austria	Vienna	Met with Quartet representatives and the Foreign Ministers of Russia, Turkey, and Saudi Arabia.	October 23, 2015	
71	Jordan	Amman	Met with King Abdullah II, Foreign Minister Nasser Judeh, and Palestinian Authority President Mahmoud Abbas.	October 24, 2015	Secretary Kerry with Palestinian Authority President Mahmoud Abbas in Amman, October 2015
71	Saudi Arabia	Riyadh	Met with King Salman, Foreign Minister Adel al-Jubeir, Crown Prince Mohammed bin Nayef, and Deputy Crown Prince Mohammed bin Salman.	October 24, 2015	Secretary Kerry with Saudi Foreign Minister Adel al-Jubeir in Riyadh, October 2015
72	Austria	Vienna	Met with Austrian Foreign Minister Sebastian Kurz, UN Special Envoy for Syria Staffan de Mistura, and the Foreign Ministers of Iran, Russia, Saudi Arabia, and Turkey. Attended a meeting on Syria.	October 29–31, 2015	Secretary Kerry with Austrian Foreign Minister Sebastian Kurz in Vienna, October 2015
72	Kyrgyzstan	Bishkek	Attended the dedication of a new Embassy compound. Met with President Almazbek Atambaev and Foreign Minister Erlan Abdyldaev. Addressed the American University of Central Asia.	October 31 – November 1, 2015	Secretary Kerry with Kyrgyz President Erlan Abdyldaev in Bishkek, October 2015
72	Uzbekistan	Samarkand	Met with President Islam Karimov and the Foreign Ministers of Kazakhstan, Kyrgyzstan, Tajikistan, Turkmenistan, and Uzbekistan.	November 1, 2015	Secretary Kerry with Uzbekistan President Islam Karimov in Samarkand, November 2015
72	Kazakhstan	Astana	Met with President Nursultan Nazarbayev and attended the Fourth–U.S. Kazakhstan Strategic Partnership Dialogue.	November 2, 2015	Secretary Kerry with Kazakhstan President Nursultan Nazarbayev in Astana, November 2015
72	Tajikistan	Dushanbe	Met with President Emomali Rahmon.	November 3, 2015	Secretary Kerry with Tajikistan President Emomali Rahmon in Dushanbe, November 2015
72	Turkmenistan	Ashgabat	Met with President Gurbanguly Berdimuhamedow.	November 3, 2015	Secretary Kerry with Turkmenistan President Gurbanguly Berdimuhamedov in Ashgabat, November 2015
72	United Kingdom	London	Met with Foreign Secretary Philip Hammond.	November 3–4, 2015	
73	Tunisia	Tunis	Attended the U.S.–Tunisia Strategic Dialogue Plenary.	November 13, 2015	
73	Austria	Vienna	Met with the Foreign Ministers of Saudi Arabia, Turkey, Russia, and Iran, and with UN Special Envoy for Syria Staffan de Mistura. Attended a meeting on Syria.	November 13–14, 2015	
73	Turkey	Antalya	Attended the G-20 Leadership Summit.	November 15–16, 2015	
73	France	Paris	Met with President François Hollande and Foreign Minister Laurent Fabius.	November 16–17, 2015	Secretary Kerry with French Foreign Minister Laurent Fabius in PAris, November 2015
74	United Arab Emirates	Abu Dhabi	Met with Crown Prince Mohammed bin Zayed and with the Foreign Ministers of the United Arab Emirates and Saudi Arabia.	November 23, 2015	Secretary Kerry with UAE Crown Prince Mohammed bin Zayed in Abu Dhabi, November 2015
74	Israel	Jerusalem	Met with President Reuven Rivlin, Prime Minister Benjamin Netanyahu, and Opposition leader Isaac Herzog.	November 24, 2015	Secretary Kerry with Israeli Prime Minister Benjamin Netanyahu in Jerusalem, November 2015
74	Palestinian National Authority	Ramallah	Met with President Mahmoud Abbas.	November 24, 2015	Secretary Kerry with Palestinian Authority President Mahmoud Abbas in Ramallah, November 2015
75	France	Paris	Attended the UN Climate Change Summit and met with Egyptian Foreign Minister Sameh Shoukry.	December 1, 2015	
75	Belgium	Brussels	Attended a NATO Foreign Ministers' Meeting.	December 1–2, 2015	Secretary Kerry with NATO Secretary General Stoltenberg in Brussels, December 2015
75	Kosovo	Pristina	Met with President Isa Mustafa.	December 2, 2015	
75	Serbia	Belgrade	Attended an OSCE Ministerial Meeting and a meeting of OSCE Minsk Group Co-Chair Countries. Met with Prime Minister Aleksandar Vučić and Ukrainian Foreign Minister Pavlo Klimkin.	December 2–3, 2015	Secretary Kerry with Ukrainian Foreign Minister Pavlo Klimkin in Belgrade, December 2015
75	Cyprus	Nicosia	Met with President Nicos Anastasiades, Foreign Minister Ioannis Kasoulides, Turkish Cypriot leader Mustafa Akinci, and UN Special Adviser Espen Barth Eide.	December 3, 2015	
75	Greece	Athens	Met with Prime Minister Alexis Tsipras and Foreign Minister Nikos Kotzias. Visited migrants and volunteers.	December 4, 2015	Secretary Kerry with Greek Foreign Minister Nikos Kotzias in Athens, December 2015
76	France	Paris	Attended the UN Climate Change Summit.	December 8–12, 2015	Secretary Kerry at COP21 in Paris, December 2015
76	Italy	Rome	Attended a Ministerial Meeting on Libya.	December 12–15, 2015	Secretary Kerry with Italian Foreign Minister Paolo Gentiloni in Rome, December 2015
76	France	Paris	Attended a Ministerial Meeting on Syria.	December 14, 2015	Secretary Kerry with French Foreign Minister Laurent Fabius in Paris, December 2015
76	Russia	Moscow	Met with President Vladimir Putin and Foreign Minister Sergey Lavrov.	December 15, 2015	Secretary Kerry with Russian Foreign Minister Sergey Lavrov in Moscow, December 2015
77	United Kingdom	London	Discussed the Syrian crisis with Saudi Foreign Minister Adel al-Jubeir.	January 13–15, 2016	
77	Austria	Vienna	Discussed the Joint Comprehensive Plan of Action with Iranian Foreign Minister Javad Zarif and EU High Representative Federica Mogherini.	January 16, 2016	Secretary Kerry with Iranian Foreign Minister Mohammad Javad Zarif in Vienna, January 2016
78	Switzerland	Zürich, Davos	Discussed the Syrian and Ukrainian crises with Russian Foreign Minister Sergey Lavrov. Attended the World Economic Forum Annual Meeting.	January 20–22, 2016	Secretary Kerry at the World Economic Forum in Davos, January 2016
78	Saudi Arabia	Riyadh	Met with Foreign Minister Adel al-Jubeir, members of the Syrian Opposition's High Negotiations Committee, and with the Foreign Ministers of the Gulf Cooperation Council states.	January 23–25, 2016	Secretary Kerry with Saudi Foreign Minister Adel al-Jubeir in Riyadh, January 2016
78	Laos	Vientiane	Met with Prime Minister Thongsing Thammavong and Foreign Minister Thongloun Sisoulith. Addressed a YSEALI Interaction Event.	January 25, 2016	Secretary Kerry with Laotian Prime Minister Thongsing Thammavong in Vientiane, January 2016
78	Cambodia	Phnom Penh	Met with Prime Minister Hun Sen and Foreign Minister Hor Namhong.	January 26, 2016	Secretary Kerry with Cambodian Prime Minister Hun Sen in Phnom Penh, January 2016
78	China	Beijing	Met with President & CCP General Secretary Xi Jinping, Foreign Minister Wang Yi, and State Councilor Yang Jiechi.	January 27, 2016	
79	Canada	Quebec City	Attended the North American Foreign Ministerial Meeting.	January 29, 2016	Secretary Kerry with Canadian Foreign Minister Stéphane Dion in Quebec City, January 2016
80	Italy	Rome	Attended a Ministerial Meeting of the Small Group of the Global Coalition to Counter ISIL.	February 1–2, 2016	Secretary Kerry with Italian Foreign Minister Paolo Gentiloni in Rome, February 2016
80	United Kingdom	London	Attended the Fourth Syria Donors Conference.	February 3–4, 2016	Secretary Kerry with British Foreign Secretary Philip Hammond in London, February 2016
81	Germany	Munich	Attended the 52nd Munich Security Conference and an International Syria Support Group meeting.	February 10–14, 2016	Secretary Kerry at the Munich Security Conference, February 2016
81	Albania	Tirana	Met with Prime Minister Edi Rama.	February 14, 2016	
82	United Kingdom	London	Met with Foreign Secretary Philip Hammond.	February 19–20, 2016	Secretary Kerry with British Foreign Secretary Philip Hammond in London, February 2016
82	Jordan	Amman, Aqaba	Met with King Abdullah II, Foreign Minister Nasser Judeh, and Palestinian Authority President Mahmoud Abbas.	February 20–21, 2016	Secretary Kerry with Palestinian Authority President Mahmoud Abbas in Amman, February 2016
83	Saudi Arabia	Hafr al-Batin	Met with King Salman bin Abdulaziz al-Saud, Crown Prince Mohammed bin Nayef, Deputy Crown Prince Mohammad bin Salman al-Saud, and Foreign Minister Adel al-Jubeir.	March 11–12, 2016	Secretary Kerry with Saudi King Salman in Hafr al-Batin, March 2016
83	France	Paris	Met with the Foreign Ministers of France, Germany, Italy, and the United Kingdom, and with EU High Representative Mogherini.	March 12–13, 2016	Secretary Kerry with French Foreign Minister Jean-Marc Ayrault in Paris, March 2016
84	Cuba	Havana	Accompanied President Obama.	March 21–22, 2016	Secretary Kerry with Cuban Foreign Minister Bruno Rodriguez Parilla in Havana, March 2016
84	Russia	Moscow	Met with President Vladimir Putin and Foreign Minister Sergey Lavrov.	March 23–24, 2016	Secretary Kerry with Russian President Vladimir Putin in Moscow, March 2016
84	Belgium	Brussels	Met with Belgian and EU officials and expressed condolences following a March 22 terrorist attack.	March 25, 2016	Secretary Kerry with Belgian Prime Minister Charles Michel and Foreign Minister Didier Reynders in Brussels, March 2016
85	Bahrain	Manama	Attended a ministerial meeting of the Gulf Cooperation Council.	April 6–8, 2016	Secretary Kerry with King Hamad bin Isa Al Khalifa of Bahrain in Manama, April 2016
85	Iraq	Baghdad	Met with Prime Minister Haider al-Abadi, Foreign Minister Ibrahim al-Jaafari, Council of Representatives Speaker Saleem al-Jabouri, and Kurdish Regional Government Prime Minister Nechervan Barzani.	April 8, 2016	Secretary Kerry with Iraqi Prime Minister Haider Al-Abadi in Baghdad, April 2016
85	Afghanistan	Kabul	Attended the third meeting of the U.S.–Afghanistan Bilateral Commission.	April 9, 2016	Secretary Kerry with Afghan President Ashraf Ghani in Kabul, April 2016
85	Japan	Hiroshima	Attended a G-7 ministerial meeting.	April 10–11, 2016	Secretary Kerry with G7 Foreign Ministers in Hirsohima, April 2016
86	Egypt	Cairo	Met with President Abdel Fattah al-Sisi and Foreign Minister Sameh Shoukry.	April 20, 2016	Secretary Kerry with Egyptian President Abdel Fattah al-Sisi in Cairo, April 2016
86	Saudi Arabia	Riyadh	Attended a Gulf Cooperation Council Summit Meeting with President Obama.	April 21, 2016	Secretary Kerry with Saudi Deputy Crown Prince Mohammad bin Salman Al Saud in Riyadh, April 2016
87	Switzerland	Geneva	Discussed the Syrian conflict with Jordanian Foreign Minister Nasser Judeh, Saudi Arabian Foreign Minister Adel al-Jubeir, and UN Special Envoy Staffan de Mistura.	May 1–2, 2016	Secretary Kerry with UN Special Envoy Staffan de Mistura in Geneva, May 2016
88	France	Paris	Met with Foreign Minister Jean-Marc Ayrault.	May 9–10, 2016	Secretary Kerry with French Foreign Minister Jean-Marc Ayrault in Paris, May 2016
88	United Kingdom	London, Oxford	Attended the Anti-Corruption Summit. Addressed the Oxford Union.	May 10–12, 2016	Secretary Kerry with British Prime Minister David Cameron in Oxford, May 2016
89	Saudi Arabia	Jeddah, Al Wajh	Met with King Salman bin Abdulaziz al-Saud, Crown Prince Mohammed bin Nayef, and Deputy Crown Prince Mohammad bin Salman al-Saud.	May 15, 2016	Secretary Kerry with Saudi King Salman in Jeddah, May 2016
89	Austria	Vienna	Co-hosted meetings on Libya and of the International Syria Support Group. Co-hosted a meeting of the Presidents of Armenia and Azerbaijan on the Nagorno Karabakh conflict.	May 16–18, 2016	Secretary Kerry with Russian Foreign Minister Sergey Lavrov in Vienna, May 2016
89	Egypt	Cairo	Met with President Abdel Fattah al-Sisi.	May 18, 2016	Secretary Kerry with Egyptian President Abdel Fattah al-Sisi in Cairo, May 2016
89	Belgium	Brussels	Attended a NATO Ministerial Meeting.	May 18–21, 2016	Secretary Kerry with NATO Foreign Ministers in Brussels, May 2016
89	Myanmar	Naypyitaw	Met with Foreign Minister Daw Aung San Suu Kyi	May 22, 2016	Secretary Kerry with Myanmar Foreign Minister Aung San Suu Kyi in Naypyitaw, May 2016
89	Vietnam	Hanoi, Ho Chi Minh City	Accompanied President Obama.	May 22–25, 2016	Secretary Kerry with Vietnamese Deputy Prime Minister and Foreign Minister Phạm Bình Minh in Hanoi, May 2016
90	France	Paris	Attended a French-hosted ministerial meeting on Middle East peace, and discussed the Counter-ISIL Coalition's efforts with Foreign Minister Jean-Marc Ayrault.	June 2–4, 2016	Secretary Kerry with French Foreign Minister Jean-Marc Ayrault in Paris, June 2016
90	Mongolia	Ulaanbaatar	Met with Foreign Minister Lundeg Purevsuren.	June 5, 2016	Secretary Kerry with Mongolian Foreign Minister Lundeg Purevsuren in Ulaanbaatar, June 2016
90	China	Beijing	With Treasury Secretary Jacob J. Lew, attended the 8th U.S.–China Strategic and Economic Dialogue. Also attended the 7th Annual U.S.–China Consultation on People-to-People Exchange.	June 5–8, 2016	Secretary Kerry with Chinese leader Xi Jinping in Beijing, June 2016
90	United Arab Emirates	Abu Dhabi	Met with Crown Prince Mohammed bin Zayed and senior officials.	June 8–9, 2016	Secretary Kerry with UAE Crown Prince Mohammed bin Zayed in Abu Dhabi, June 2016
91	Dominican Republic	Santo Domingo	Attended the OAS General Assembly.	June 13–14, 2016	Secretary Kerry with Dominican President Danilo Medina in Santo Domingo, June 2016
91	Norway	Oslo, Svalbard, Ny-Ålesund	Attended the Oslo Forum. Visited Arctic researchers in Svalbard.	June 14–16, 2016	Secretary Kerry with Norwegian Prime Minister Erna Solberg in Oslo, June 2016
91	Denmark	Copenhagen	Met with Prime Minister Lars Løkke Rasmussen and Foreign Minister Kristian Jensen.	June 16–17, 2016	Secretary Kerry with Danish Prime Minister Lars Løkke Rasmussen in Copenhagen, June 2016
91	Greenland	Ilulissat	Met with Foreign Minister Vittus Qujaukitsoq and Foreign Minister Jensen.	June 17, 2016	Secretary Kerry with Greenlandic Premier Kim Kielsen, Foreign Minister Vittus Qujaukitsoq and Danish Foreign Minister Kristian Jensen in Ilulissat, June 2016
92	Italy	Rome	Met with Foreign Minister Paolo Gentiloni and Israeli Prime Minister Benjamin Netanyahu.	June 25–27, 2016	Secretary Kerry with Italian Foreign Minister Paolo Gentiloni in Rome, June 2016
92	Belgium	Brussels	Met with EU High Representative Federica Mogherini and NATO Secretary General Jens Stoltenberg.	June 27, 2016	Secretary Kerry with EU High Representative Federica Mogherini in Brussels, June 2016
92	United Kingdom	London	Met with Foreign Secretary Philip Hammond.	June 27, 2016	Secretary Kerry with British Foreign Secretary Philip Hammond in London, June 2016
92	Canada	Ottawa	Attended the North American Leaders Summit with President Obama.	June 28–29, 2016	Secretary Kerry with Canadian Foreign Minister Stephane Dion and Mexican Foreign Secretary Claudia Ruiz Massieu in Ottawa, June 2016
93	Georgia	Tbilisi	Met with President Giorgi Margvelashvili and Prime Minister Giorgi Kvirikashvili and co-chaired a meeting of the U.S.–Georgia Strategic Partnership Commission.	July 6–7, 2016	Secretary Kerry with Georgian President Giorgi Margvelashvili in Tbilisi, July 2016
93	Ukraine	Kyiv	Met with President Petro Poroshenko and Prime Minister Volodymyr Groysman.	July 7, 2016	Secretary Kerry with Ukrainian President Petro Poroshenko in Kyiv, July 2016
93	Poland	Warsaw	Accompanied President Obama to the NATO Summit Meeting.	July 8, 2016	Secretary Kerry with NATO Foreign Ministers in Warsaw, July 2016
94	France	Paris	Attended Bastille Day celebrations.	July 13–14, 2016	Secretary Kerry with French Foreign Minister Jean-Marc Ayrault in Paris, July 2016
94	Russia	Moscow	Met with President Vladimir Putin and Foreign Minister Sergey Lavrov.	July 14–15, 2016	Secretary Kerry with Russian President Vladimir Putin in Moscow, July 2016
94	Luxembourg	Luxembourg	Met with Deputy Prime Minister/Foreign Minister Jean Asselborn.	July 16–17, 2016	Secretary Kerry with Luxembourgian Deputy Prime Minister and Foreign Minister Jean Asselborn in Luxembourg City, July 2016
94	Belgium	Brussels	Met with EU Member States Foreign Ministers and with EU High Representative Mogherini.	July 17–18, 2016	Secretary Kerry with EU High Representative Federica Mogherini in Brussels, July 2016
94	United Kingdom	London	Met with Foreign Secretary Boris Johnson and UN Special Envoy de Mistura.	July 18–19, 2016	Secretary Kerry with British Foreign Secretary Boris Johnson in London, July 2016
95	Austria	Vienna	Attended the opening of the Extraordinary Meeting of the Parties to the Montreal Protocol.	July 22, 2016	
95	France	Paris	Met with Palestinian Authority President Mahmoud Abbas.	July 22–24, 2016	
95	Laos	Vientiane	Attended the ASEAN Regional Forum, the East Asian Summit Foreign Ministers' Meeting, the ASEAN–U.S. Ministerial Meeting and the Lower Mekong Initiative Ministerial Meeting.	July 25–26, 2016	Secretary Kerry participates in the ASEAN-U.S. Ministerial in Vientiane, July 2016
95	Philippines	Manila	Met with President Rodrigo Duterte and Foreign Secretary Perfecto Yasay.	July 26–27, 2016	Secretary Kerry with Filipino President Rodrigo Duterte in Manila, July 2016
96	France	Paris	Met with Foreign Minister Jean-Marc Ayrault and Palestinian Authority President Mahmoud Abbas.	July 29–31, 2016	Secretary Kerry with French Foreign Minister Jean-Marc Ayrault in Paris, July 2016
97	Argentina	Buenos Aires	Met with President Mauricio Macri, opened the U.S.–Argentina High Level Dialogue, and addressed the Argentine–American Chamber of Commerce.	August 3–4, 2016	Secretary Kerry with Argentine President Mauricio Macri in Buenos Aires, August 2016
97	Brazil	Rio de Janeiro	Met with Foreign Minister José Serra and attended the Opening Ceremony of the 2016 Summer Olympics.	August 5–6, 2016	Secretary Kerry with Brazilian Foreign Minister José Serra in Rio de Janeiro, August 2016
98	Kenya	Nairobi	Met with President Uhuru Kenyatta and Foreign Minister Amina Mohamed and regional Foreign Ministers.	August 22, 2016	Secretary Kerry with Kenyan President Uhuru Kenyatta in Nairobi, August 2016
98	Nigeria	Sokoto, Abuja	Met with local civic and religious leaders in Sokoto, and with President Muhammadu Buhari, Foreign Minister Geoffrey Onyeama, and northern governors.	August 23–24, 2016	Secretary Kerry with Nigerian President Muhammadu Buhari in Abuja, August 2016
98	Saudi Arabia	Jeddah	Met with the Foreign Ministers of the Gulf Cooperation Council and of the United Kingdom, and the UN Special Envoy for Yemen.	August 24–25, 2016	Secretary Kerry with Saudi King Salman in Jeddah, August 2016
98	Switzerland	Geneva	Met with Russian Foreign Minister Sergey Lavrov.	August 25–28, 2016	Secretary Kerry with Russian Foreign Minister Sergey Lavrov in Geneva, August 2016
98	Bangladesh	Dhaka	Met with Prime Minister Sheikh Hasina, Foreign Minister Mahmood Ali, and Nationalist Party Chairperson Khaleda Zia.	August 29, 2016	Secretary Kerry with Bangladeshi Prime Minister Sheikh Hasina in Dhaka, August 2016
98	India	New Delhi	Met with Prime Minister Narendra Modi. With Commerce Secretary Penny Pritzker, co-chaired the second U.S.–India Strategic and Commercial Dialogue. Met with Egyptian President Abdel Fattah al-Sisi.	August 29 – September 1, 2016	Secretary Kerry with Indian Prime Minister in New Delhi, September 2016
99	China	Hangzhou	Attended the G-20 Summit Meeting with President Obama.	September 3–6, 2016	Secretary Kerry with President Obama and Chinese leader Xi Jinping in Hangzhou, September 2016
100	Switzerland	Geneva	Discussed the Syrian conflict with Russian Foreign Minister Sergey Lavrov and UN Special Envoy Staffan de Mistura.	September 8–9, 2016	Secretary Kerry with Russian Foreign Minister Sergey Lavrov in Geneva, September 2016
101	Colombia	Cartagena	Attended the signing of the Colombian Peace Accord.	September 26, 2016	Secretary Kerry with Colombian President Juan Manuel Santos in Cartagena, September 2016
102	Belgium	Brussels	Attended the Brussels Conference on Afghanistan.	October 4–5, 2016	Secretary Kerry with Afghan President Ashraf Ghani in Brussels, October 2016
103	Rwanda	Kigali	With EPA Administrator Gina McCarthy, attended the 28th Meeting of the Parties to the Montreal Protocol.	October 13–14, 2016	Secretary Kerry with Rwandan President Paul Kagame in Kigali, October 2016
103	Switzerland	Lausanne	Met with the Foreign Ministers of Russia, Saudi Arabia, Qatar, Turkey, Egypt, Iraq, Jordan, and Iran, and UN Special Envoy de Mistura.	October 15, 2016	
103	United Kingdom	London	Met with Foreign Secretary Boris Johnson and UN Special Envoy for Yemen Ismail Ould Cheikh Ahmed.	October 16, 2016	Secretary Kerry with British Foreign Secretary Boris Johnson in London, October 2016
104	Ireland	Tipperary	Met with Foreign Minister Charles Flanagan and received the Tipperary International Peace Award.	October 30, 2016	Secretary Kerry with Irish Foreign Minister Charlie Flanagan in Tipperary, October 2016
104	United Kingdom	London	Attended a Libya Ministerial Meeting and received the Benjamin Franklin House Medal for Leadership and the Chatham House Prize.	October 31, 2016	
105	Antarctica	McMurdo Sound, South Pole	Visited the McMurdo Station and the Amundsen–Scott South Pole Station. First visit of a Secretary of State to Antarctica.	November 10–12, 2016	
105	New Zealand	Wellington, Christchurch	Met with Prime Minister John Key and Foreign Minister Murray McCully. Dedicated the site of the United States Memorial.	November 12–13, 2016	
105	Oman	Muscat	Discussed the Yemen conflict with Sultan Qaboos and Foreign Minister Yusuf bin Alawi.	November 14, 2016	Secretary Kerry with Omani Foreign Minister Yusuf bin Alawi on Muscat, November 2016
105	United Arab Emirates	Abu Dhabi	Met with Crown Prince Mohammed bin Zayed.	November 15, 2016	
105	Morocco	Marrakesh	Attended and addressed the 22nd Conference of the Parties to the UN Framework Convention on Climate Change.	November 15–16, 2016	Secretary Kerry at COP22 in Marrakesh, November 2016
105	Peru	Lima	Attended an APEC Ministerial Meeting.	November 16, 2016	Secretary Kerry with Peruvian Foreign Minister Mendoza Amidst in Lima, November 2016
106	Italy	Rome	Met with Foreign Minister Paolo Gentiloni and attended the Rome Mediterranean Dialogues.	December 2–3, 2016	Secretary Kerry with Italian Foreign Minister Paolo Gentiloni in Rome, December 2016
106	Vatican City	Vatican City	Met with Secretary of State Cardinal Pietro Parolin.	December 2, 2016	Secretary Kerry with Pope Francis at Vatican City, December 2016
106	Germany	Berlin	Met with Foreign Minister Frank-Walter Steinmeier. Received the Federal Cross of Merit.	December 4–5, 2016	Secretary Kerry with German Foreign Minister Frank-Walter Steinmeier in Berlin, December 2016
106	Belgium	Brussels	Attended a NATO Ministerial Meeting. Met with EU High Representative Mogherini.	December 6–7, 2016	Secretary Kerry with EU High Representative Federica Mogherini in Brussels, December 2016
106	Germany	Hamburg	Attended an OSCE Ministerial Meeting.	December 7–8, 2016	
106	France	Paris	Discussed the Syrian conflict with the Foreign Ministers of France, Germany, and Qatar. Received the Legion of Honor.	December 8–11, 2016	Secretary Kerry with French Foreign Minister Jean-Marc Ayrault in Paris, December 2016
107	Saudi Arabia	Riyadh	Met with King Salman bin Abdulaziz al-Saud and with the Foreign Ministers of Saudi Arabia and Oman.	December 17–19, 2016	Secretary Kerry with Saudi King Salman in Riyadh, December 2016
108	Vietnam	Hanoi, Ho Chi Minh City, Cà Mau	Met with Prime Minister Nguyễn Xuân Phúc and Acting Foreign Minister Bùi Thanh Sơn. Delivered a speech at the Ho Chi Minh University of Technology and Education.	January 13–14, 2017	Secretary Kerry with Vietnamese Acting Foreign Minister Bùi Thanh Sơn in Hanoi, January 2017
108	France	Paris	Attended a Middle East Peace Conference.	January 15, 2017	Secretary Kerry participates in a Middle East Peace Conference in Paris, January 2017
108	United Kingdom	London	Met with Foreign Secretary Boris Johnson.	January 16, 2017	
108	Switzerland	Davos	Attended the World Economic Forum.	January 17–18, 2017	Secretary Kerry at the World Economic Forum in Davos, January 2017

== See also ==
- Foreign policy of the Obama administration
- List of international presidential trips made by Barack Obama
