= Onyema =

- Gender: Male
- Language: Igbo

Origin
- Origin: Nigeria
- Meaning: Who knows
- Region of origin: South East, Nigeria

Onyema audio is a Nigerian male name and surname of Igbo origin. It means "Who knows." The name carries a strong cultural significance, representing the power and guidance of the Almighty in the lives of individuals.

== Notable individuals with the name ==
- Allen Onyema (born 1964), Nigerian entrepreneur.
- Elvis Onyema (born 1986), Nigerian football player.
- Onyema Ugochukwu (born 1944), Nigerian economist, journalist, and politician.
- Onyema Ogbuagu (born 1978), Nigerian American-born infectious diseases physician, educator, researcher, and clinical trial investigator.
- Oscar N. Onyema (born 1968), Nigerian financier.
- His Royal Majesty Eze V. B. C. Onyema III (born 1927), Nigerian monarch.
