= Dillibe Onyeama =

Nigerian author, publisher (1951–2022)

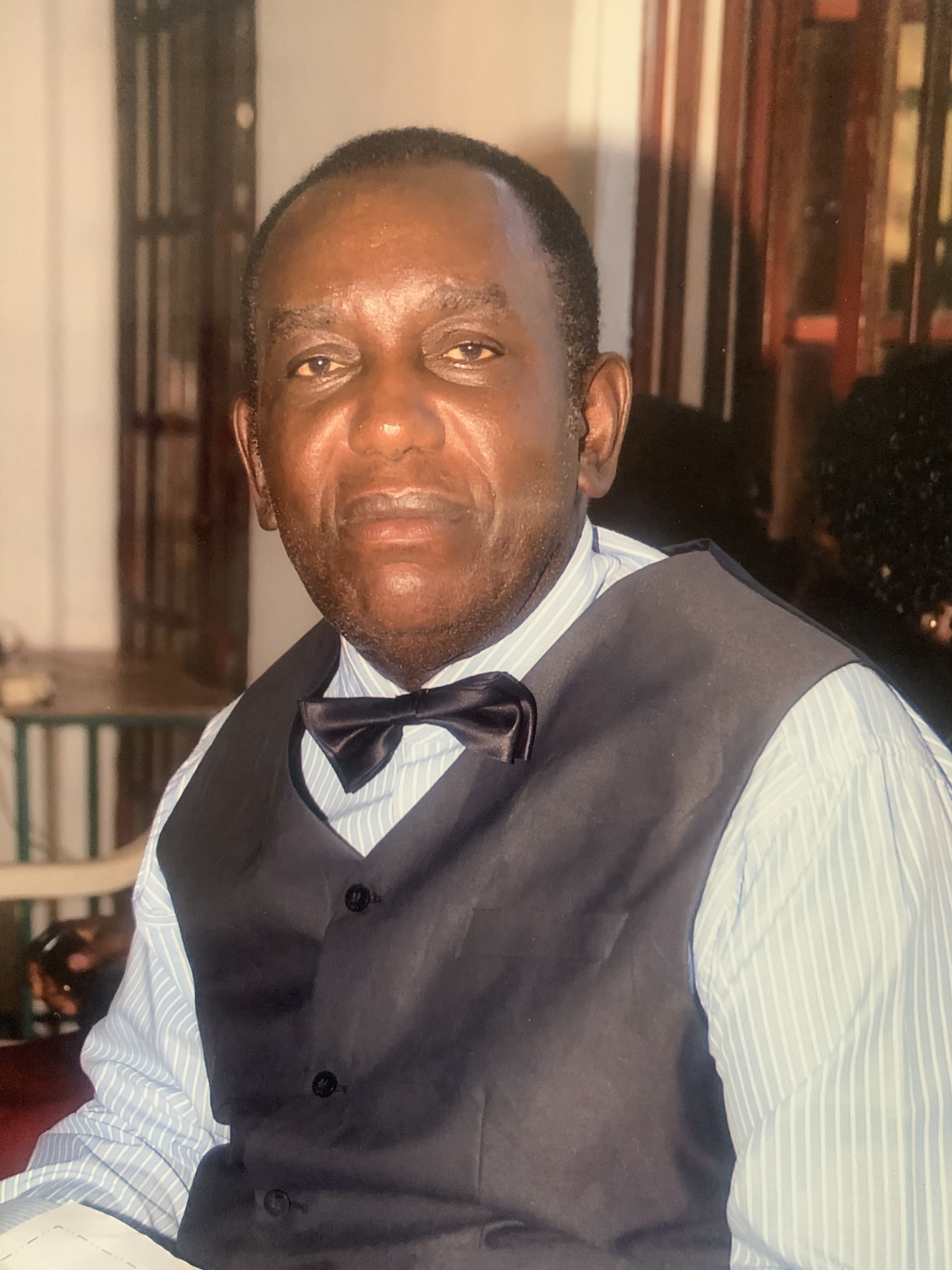
- Onyeama in 2016
- Born: Charles Dillibe Onyeama; 6 January 1951; Enugu, Southern Region, British Nigeria (now in Enugu State, Nigeria)
- Died: 10 November 2022 (aged 71); Enugu, Nigeria
- Education: Eton College
- Occupation: Journalist Author Publisher
- Notable work: Nigger at Eton (1972)
- Children: 6
- Parent: Charles Onyeama (father)
- Relatives: Geoffrey Onyeama (brother)

Charles Dillibe Ejiofor Onyeama (6 January 1951 – 10 November 2022) was a Nigerian author and publisher. In 1969, he became the first black person to finish his studies at Eton College in England. He wrote a book about his experiences of racism at Eton, A Black Boy at Eton, which resulted him being banned from visiting the school by then-headmaster Michael McCrum.

== Biography ==
Dillibe Charles Onyeama was born in Enugu, Nigeria, in 1951, the second son of Charles Onyeama, a Justice of the Supreme Court of Nigeria and Judge at the International Court of Justice who was himself the son of Onyeama of Eke, a ruling chief in the Nigerian chieftaincy system. On the day of his birth, he became the first black boy to be registered to attend Eton College. He attended preparatory school at Grove Park in Sussex, before becoming a pupil at Eton in 1965, and leaving in 1969. Onyeama wrote a book while still a teenager about his experiences of racist discrimination and bullying at the elite British boarding school, which has educated generations of British royalty and statesmen. The book titled Nigger at Eton, published in 1972 by Leslie Frewin Limited, was republished by Penguin in 2022 with the title A Black Boy at Eton.

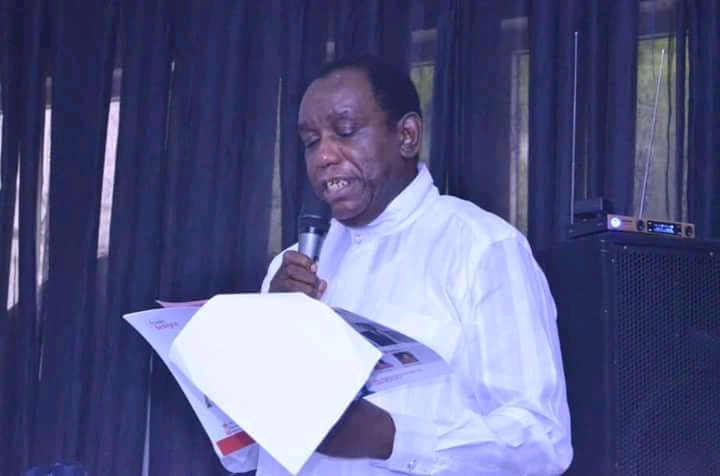
Dillibe Onyeama giving a speech at one of his literary events

In 2020 the school's present headmaster, Simon Henderson, offered Onyeama an apology for the treatment he had received. Onyeama said he would return to Eton to accept the apology as long as the costs of his trip were covered.

Onyeama obtained a diploma from the Premier School of Journalism, incorporating the Writers School of Great Britain before returning to Nigeria In 1981, and establishing the publishing company Delta Publications, based in Enugu.

Onyeama died from a heart attack on 10 November 2022, at the age of 71.

== Selected bibliography ==
- Nigger at Eton, 1972 (later re-released as A Black Boy at Eton)
- John Bull's Nigger, 1974
- Sex is a Nigger's Game, 1976
- Juju, 1977
- Secret Society, 1978
- The Return: Homecoming of a Negro from Eton, 1978
- Female Target, 1979
- Revenge of the medicine man, 1980
- Night Demon, 1982
- Chief Onyeama: The Story of an African God, 1982
- African Legend: The Incredible Story of Francis Arthur Nzeribe, 1984
- Godfathers of Voodoo, 1985
- The New Man: A Perspective in Evil, 2002
- Dadi: The Man, the Legend : an Intimate Portrait of His Excellency Judge Charles Dadi Onyeama of the International Court of Justice, The Hague, 2021
