= Charles Onyeama =

Nigerian judge (1916–1999)

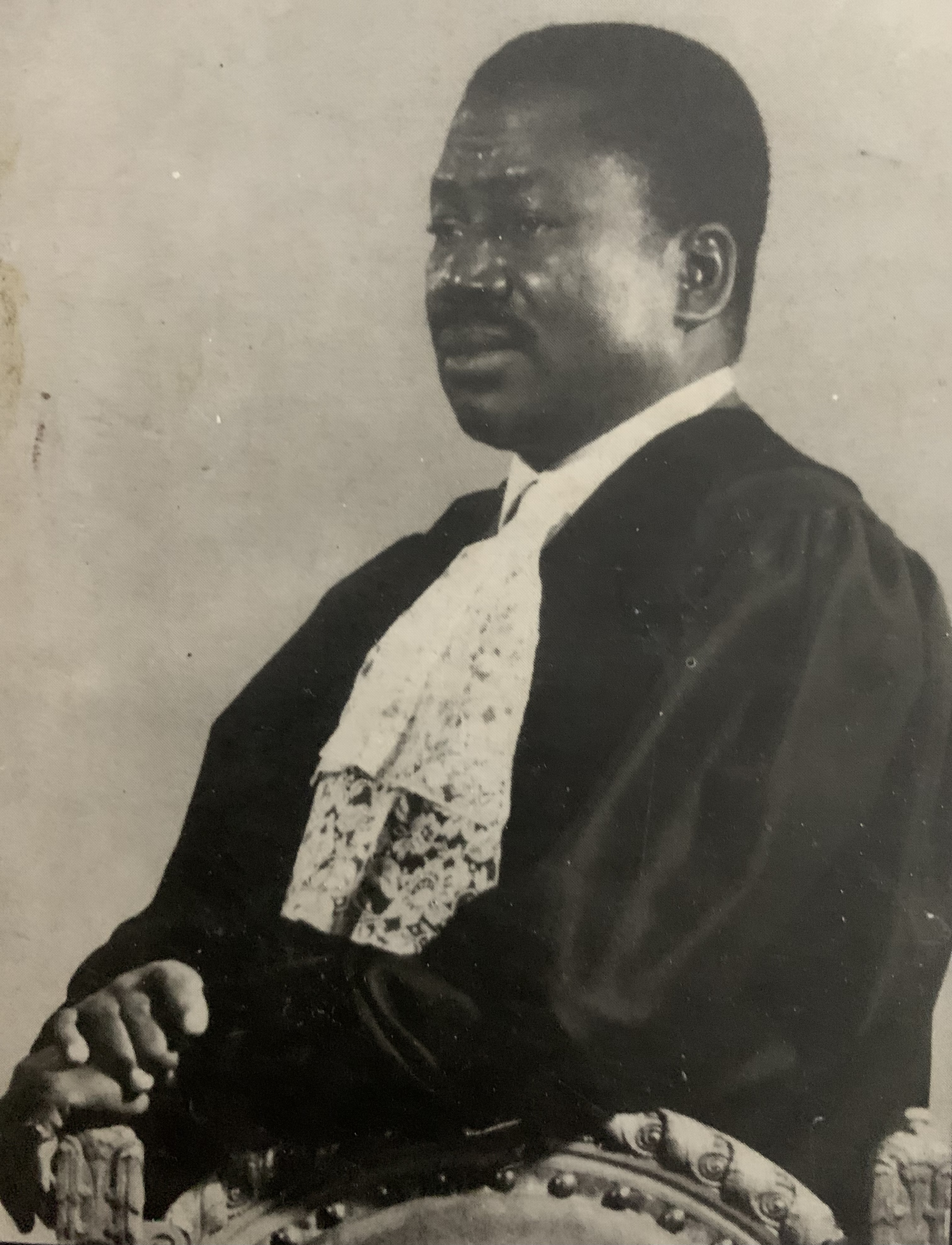
Charles Dadi Onyeama

Charles Dadi Umeha Onyeama// (26 April 1916 – 5 September 1999) was a Justice of the Supreme Court of Nigeria, the first Nigerian judge at the International Court of Justice, and father of the former Nigerian Minister of Foreign Affairs, Geoffrey Onyeama, and writer Dillibe Onyeama. He was also grandfather to Scottish professional rugby player, Andrew Onyeama Christie.

== Early life and education ==
Charles Onyeama was born in Enugu on 26 April 1916 ("officially" listed incorrectly as 5 August 1917). He was the son of Chief Onyeama of Eke, a powerful ruler of the Agbaja region of Igboland. Onyeama initially taught at the Government School in Bonny and received his secondary education at King's College, Lagos. He later attended Achimota College in Ghana; University College, London; and studied for a degree at Brasenose College, Oxford, from 1940 to 1941. He became a member of Lincoln's Inn.

== Career ==
In 1944, he became an assistant district officer in Lagos, followed by serving on the Legislative Council from 1944 to 1946. After being appointed Chief Magistrate in 1952, he became a judge of the High Council in 1957.

Onyeama served as justice of the Supreme Court of Nigeria from 1964 to 1967. His contemporaries on the Supreme Court include Sir Adetokunbo Ademola, Sir Lionel Brett, Sir Vahe Bairamian, Justice G.B.A. Coker, Justice M.O. Ajegbo, and Justice Chike Idigbe.

After a series of unpopular judgements of the International Court of Justice (ICJ) in 1966, African countries demanded greater representation amongst its judges. The Australian judge filling the seat dedicated to the Commonwealth was replaced with Onyeama after getting elected in November 1966, raising the number of African judges on the ICJ to two. Onyeama served from 1967 to 1976 and was succeeded by Taslim Olawale Elias.

He was appointed as a judge for the 1971 Beagle Channel Arbitration.

In 1976, the Federal Military Government of Nigeria appointed Onyeama Chairman of the Board of Ife University Teaching Hospital Complex, presently known as Obafemi Awolowo University Teaching Hospital Complex. In 1979, Onyeama was appointed by the Federal Military Government as Chairman of the Orthopaedic Hospital Management Board. The latter appointment was renewed in 1982 but Onyeama resigned in September 1983.

In 1980, Onyeama was nominated for the National Honor, award of the Commander of the Federal Republic of Nigeria, CFR, which he received the following year. About 1980, Onyeama was appointed Special Representative of the Secretary General of the United Nations to examine human rights in a designated country.

Onyeama was honored by the University of Nigeria with a Doctor of Laws (honoris causa).

From 1982 to 1990, he served as a judge at the World Bank Administrative Tribunal.
