= 2014 international conferences on Iraqi security =

Following US President Barack Obama's address on the subject, a series of international conferences took place in order to build a formal coalition to destroy the Islamic State of Iraq and the Levant, which had taken over large portions of Syria and Iraq and had briefly invaded a small part of Lebanon.

== International conferences ==
=== Jeddah Communiqué ===
The first of these conferences took place on 11 September 2014 in Jeddah, Saudi Arabia and was referred to as the Jeddah Communiqué. on 11 September 2014. The foreign ministers of 10 Arab countries, Saudi Arabia, Egypt, Turkey, Jordan, Bahrain, the United Arab Emirates, Kuwait, Oman and Qatar met with US Secretary of State John Kerry on what each of these countries would contribute to their common security in the matter. At the end of the conference, all the Ministers, with the exception of Turkey, signed a declaration supporting the American military effort, and their commitment to unite against the threat of terrorism, including that of terrorist group, Islamic State in Iraq and the Levant (ISIL). In addition to providing military support and humanitarian aid towards the effort, the countries also agreed to stop the flow of foreign fighters through neighboring countries, countering terror financing and extremist ideology, and enforce the necessary measures of justice against violators. Turkey declined to sign the communique due to "sensitive issues". At the time, the country had 49 diplomats being held hostage by ISIS, and as a result was reluctant to take a prominent role in the coalition. Since then, these individuals were released as 180 ISIS linked individuals and jihadists were released from Turkish prisons, despite U.S. protests of the trade.

Hezbollah, the Lebanese Shi’a militia group, protested Beirut's signing of the pledge to offer regional military cooperation against ISIL goes too far and does not confront the terrorist group. The group, which has ministers in the Lebanese cabinet and is fighting on the side of the Assad regime in the Syrian conflict, attacked its cabinet colleagues, and said that they consider Lebanese Foreign Minister Gebran Bassil’s signing of the communique as non-binding until an official clarification is issued by the Beirut government.

Kerry next went to Ankara, Turkey, and then Cairo, Egypt to shore up his support before going to Paris for the second conference on building an anti-ISIS coalition.

On 14 September, French President Francois Hollande and Iraqi President Fuad Masum hosted a meeting of high officials of more than 30 countries, including those who had been to the one in Jeddah, as well as Russian Foreign Minister Sergey Lavrov.

Iran, which had "boots on the ground" in Iraq, and Syria, which has lost much territory to ISIS, were not invited and did not attend.

== Failures ==
In a Congressional hearing before the U.S. House Committee on Foreign Affairs, subcommittee Terrorism, Nonproliferation, and Trade on the topic of terrorist financing, David Andrew Weinberg, a Senior Fellow at the Foundation for Defense of Democracies, assessed the successes and failures of the state actors who signed the agreement one year later in 2015. Notably he listed Qatar, Kuwait, and Saudi Arabia as having failed to some extent on upholding their commitments.

=== Qatar ===
Qatar was identified by U.S. officials as one of two states with “permissive jurisdictions’ for terror finance in the GCC. Despite the discovery of Qatari citizens’ private donations to al-Qaeda and its supporters, Qatar has never pursued any terrorism finance cases in its court system. Among these notable financiers Khalifa al-Subaiy and Abdulrahman al-Nu’aymi, both of whom have been sanctioned by the U.S. and U.N. as specially designated global terrorists for their role in terror financing al-Qaeda at rates of over $2 million per month. Yet, these actors were not punished under Qatari law.

In addition, Qatar has become a safe haven for terrorist groups, housing the mastermind of the 9/11 attacks, Khalid Sheikh Muhammed, openly hosting Khaled Meshaal, leader of the Palestinian terrorist group, Hamas, and the meeting spot for members of the Taliban. These groups and other sanctioned Qatari individuals continue to finance such terrorist groups.

In May 2016, Senator Mark Kirk (R-IL) wrote a letter to Secretary of the U.S. Department of the Treasury Jacob Lew, urging him to make Qatar take a more active stance on combatting terrorism finance per the agreed upon terms in the Jeddeh Communique.

=== Kuwait ===
Kuwait was the other state that the U.S. Treasury Department described as a “permissive jurisdiction” for terrorist financing. It's also important to note that Kuwait has become the top source of private donations to al-Qaeda terrorists in Syria. One of Nayef al-Ajmi's appointed ministers was revealed to have assisted in funding to al-Qaeda. Additionally, the U.S. and the U.N, sanctioned two other individuals from his tribe for terror financing. Other Kuwaitis have been linked to terror financing, but prosecution of these financier's has been mixed.

=== Saudi Arabia ===
In a 2009 memo, signed by Hillary Clinton, it was noted that Saudi Arabian funds are the most significant worldwide for Sunni terrorist groups. Saudi Arabia has hosted numerous Yemini U.S. globally designated terrorist financiers in its state, some of whom still publicly appear in the state today. Additionally, in 2015, Osama bin Laden's Mentor, Abdulmajeed al-Zindani, sanctioned for recruiting and purchasing weapons for al-Qaeda over 10 years ago, was photographed and publicly appeared in Saudi Arabia in hosting his son's lavish wedding.
