= Onyema Ogbuagu =

American-Nigerian physician and medical researcher

- Born: Onyema Eberechukwu Ogbuagu; June 20, 1978 (age 48); United States
- Occupations: Physician, researcher, educator

Onyema Eberechukwu Ogbuagu (born June 20, 1978) is a US-born infectious diseases physician, educator, researcher, and clinical trial investigator, who was raised and educated in Nigeria. He is a professor of Medicine and Pharmacology at Yale School of Medicine in New Haven, CT, US and is the director of the Yale Antivirals and Vaccines Research Program, formerly the AIDS Program clinical trials unit. His research contributions have focused on novel therapeutics and strategies for HIV/AIDS treatment and prevention as well as COVID-19 vaccination and treatment clinical trials. He switched his focus at the beginning of the 2019 COVID pandemic and participated as a principal investigator (PI) on the Pfizer-BioNtech COVID-19 vaccine trials and the Remdesivir SIMPLE trial in 2020 and 2021. In pursuit of his global health component of his career, Ogbuagu also supports postgraduate physician medical education programs in low and middle income countries in sub-Saharan Africa in Rwanda (2013–2018) and Liberia (since 2017) as well as HIV treatment programs in Liberia (since 2018).

In his role as public health educator, he has worked to increase public understanding of mRNA vaccines. Ogbuagu has also worked to decrease vaccine hesitancy. He has been a co-author on 43 scholarly articles, according to the National Library of Medicine. According to Google Scholar, one article he co-authored on Remdesivir and its use for Covid that appeared in JAMA was cited 504 times. Ogbuagu was selected as the commencement speaker for Yale School of Medicine's class of 2021.

== Early life and education ==
Onyema Ogbuagu and an identical twin brother, Chibuzo Ogbuagu II, were born to Chibuzo and Stella Ogbuagu. Nigerian doctoral students attending Yale University and University of Pennsylvania, respectively, when their twins were born. The couple had graduated in the 1974 from the University of Nigeria, Nsukka, where Stella was valedictorian. The family returned to Nigeria when Onyema and Chibuzo were five years old.

Before their recent retirement, Onyema's father was vice-chancellor of Abia State University, Nigeria, and his mother was a professor of sociology and a former deputy vice-chancellor of the same institution.

Onyema Ogbuagu attended Auntie Margaret International Primary School in Calabar, and obtained his secondary education at Federal Government College, Okigwe, Imo State, Nigeria (1988 to1994), graduating at 15. He graduated from the College of Medical Sciences, University of Calabar, Nigeria in 2004. He completed his medical internship at the Ebonyi State University Teaching Hospital in Abakaliki, Nigeria. He then returned to the United States, where he interned at the Elmhurst campus of Icahn School of Medicine at Mount Sinai. Ogbuagu completed his residency and chief residency at Mount Sinai in 2010.

Ogbuagu completed an infectious diseases fellowship at Yale School of Medicine in 2012 and assumed a faculty position as an assistant professor in the same year. Currently, he is an associate professor of medicine in the Department of Internal Medicine, Section of Infectious Diseases.

== Personal life ==
Ogbuagu is married to Grace Igiraneza Ogbuagu. She is a nephrologist and member of the International Nephrology Society.

== Career ==
Ogbuagu is an HIV/AIDS physician and leads a clinical trials program at Yale that conducts research on infectious diseases. He has been the principal investigator on pharmacokinetic, phase 2 and 3 safety and efficacy trials of novel antiviral compounds for HIV in addition to his recent work on COVID-19 vaccinations and therapeutics.

He is a clinician at Yale Medicine, the medical practice of Yale School of Medicine, and sees patients at Yale New Haven Hospital's Nathan Smith Clinic.

Ogbuagu trains physicians in Liberia and Rwanda. He has been a visiting professor to the National University of Rwanda since 2012, where he mentors medical residents and junior faculty and assists them in conducting clinical research projects that have local importance such as HIV/AIDS and antimicrobial resistance. In Liberia, he is program director of Yale's Office of Global Health's efforts to support Internal Medicine residency training. He trained the first infectious disease fellow in Liberia.

== COVID-19 and HIV/AIDS research ==
At the beginning of the COVID-19 pandemic, Ogbuagu shifted his focus from AIDS/HIV research and patient care to lead vaccine trials for COVID-19 at the Yale Center for Clinical Investigation where he was a PI on the Pfizer-BioNtech COVID-19 mRNA vaccine trial arms at Yale in adults as well as the pediatric studies for12-15 year-olds and 6 month to 11 year olds. The adult Pfizer BioNtech vaccine received emergency use authorization in the United States from the Food and Drug Administration (FDA) in 2020 and full FDA approval in 2021. There were approximately 150 sites for the Pfizer BioNtech mRNA trial, each led by a principal investigator.

Ogbuagu was also a PI for the second Phase 2b Sanofi-Glaxo Smith Klein novel COVID-19 vaccination candidate. He was also the Yale site PI for COVID treatment studies including the Remdesivir SIMPLE moderate and Severe trials.

Previous to this clinical trial work, he researched pharmacokinetic, phase 2 and 3 safety and efficacy trials of novel antiviral compounds (HIV), and conducted HIV prevention trials.

== Awards ==
In 2015, Ogbuagu was elected as a Fellow of the American College of Physicians. In 2017, He received the Steve Huot Faculty Award for Dedication and Excellence from Yale School of Medicine's Internal Medicine Primary Care Program.

In 2014 and in 2019, he received the Gerald H. Friedland prize for outstanding international research presentation by the Connecticut Infectious Diseases Society. On February 18, 2020, he also received an award from the Rwanda College of Physicians for his contribution in the fight against infectious diseases.

Ogbuagu received the annual innovator award of the HIV Medical Association at IDWeek 2024 conference in Los Angeles, California.

== Publications ==
- Tuan, J; Spichler-Moffarah, A; Ogbuagu, O (2021). "A new positive SARS-CoV-2 test months after severe COVID-19 illness: reinfection or intermittent viral shedding?". BMJ Case Rep. 14 (2) e240531. doi:10.1136/bcr-2020-240531. PMC 8098910. PMID 33542020.
- Polack, FP; Thomas, SJ; Kitchin, N; Absalon, J; Gurtman, A; Lockhart, S; Perez, JL; Pérez Marc, G; Moreira, ED; Zerbini, C; Bailey, R; Swanson, KA; Roychoudhury, S; Koury, K; Li, P; Kalina, WV; Cooper, D; Frenck, RW Jr; Hammitt, LL; Türeci, Ö; Nell, H; Schaefer, A; Ünal, S; Tresnan, DB; Mather, S; Dormitzer, PR; Şahin, U; Jansen, KU; Gruber, WC (2020). "Safety and Efficacy of the BNT162b2 mRNA Covid-19 Vaccine". N Engl J Med. 383 (27): 2603–2615. doi:10.1056/NEJMoa2034577. PMC 7745181. PMID 33301246.
- Edelman, EJ; Moore, BA; Calabrese, SK; Berkenblit, G; Cunningham, CO; Ogbuagu, O; Patel, VV; Phillips, KA; Tetrault, JM; Shah, M; Blackstock, O (2020). "Preferences for implementation of HIV pre-exposure prophylaxis (PrEP): Results from a survey of primary care providers". Prev Med Rep. 17 101012. doi:10.1016/j.pmedr.2019.101012. PMC 6926349. PMID 31890474.
- Spinner, CD; Gottlieb, RL; Criner, GJ; Arribas López, JR; Cattelan, AM; Soriano Viladomiu, A; Ogbuagu, O; Malhotra, P; Mullane, KM; Castagna, A; Chai, LYA; Roestenberg, M; Tsang, OTY; Bernasconi, E; Le Turnier, P; Chang, SC; SenGupta, D; Hyland, RH; Osinusi, AO; Cao, H; Blair, C; Wang, H; Gaggar, A; Brainard, DM; McPhail, MJ; Bhagani, S; Ahn, MY; Sanyal, AJ; Huhn, G; Marty, FM (2020). "Effect of Remdesivir vs Standard Care on Clinical Status at 11 Days in Patients With Moderate COVID-19: A Randomized Clinical Trial". JAMA. 324 (11): 1048–1057. doi:10.1001/jama.2020.16349. PMC 7442954. PMID 32821939.
- Ogbuagu, O; Marshall, BDL; Tiberio, P; Ogunbajo, A; Barakat, L; Montgomery, M; Almonte, A; Wray, T; Williams, EC; Edelman, EJ; Chan, PA (2019). "Prevalence and Correlates of Unhealthy Alcohol and Drug Use Among Men Who Have Sex with Men Prescribed HIV Pre-exposure Prophylaxis in Real-World Clinical Settings". AIDS Behav. 23 (1): 190–200. doi:10.1007/s10461-018-2260-9. PMC 7020905. PMID 30145707.
- Rutledge, R; Madden, L; Ogbuagu, O; Meyer, JP (2018). "HIV Risk perception and eligibility for pre-exposure prophylaxis in women involved in the criminal justice system". AIDS Care. 30 (10): 1282–1289. doi:10.1080/09540121.2018.1447079. PMC 6085161. PMID 29527934.
- Kambutse, I; Igiraneza, G; Ogbuagu, O (2018). "Perceptions of HIV transmission and pre-exposure prophylaxis among health care workers and community members in Rwanda". PLOS ONE. 13 (11) e0207650. Bibcode:2018PLoSO..1307650K. doi:10.1371/journal.pone.0207650. PMC 6261021. PMID 30475841.
