= Lower Mekong initiative =

Lower Mekong Initiative members

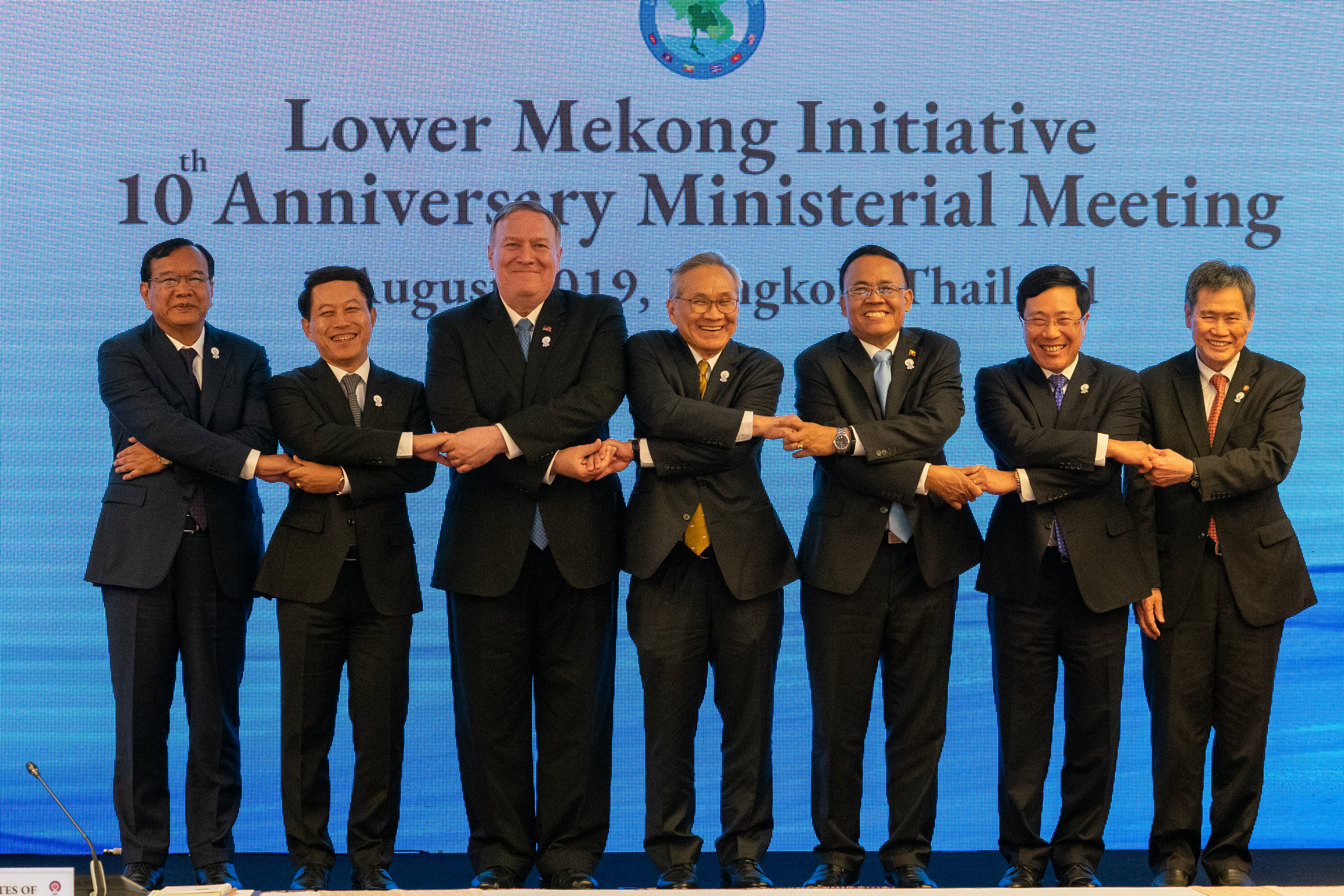
Ministers at the 2019 meeting in Bangkok, Thailand

The Lower Mekong initiative (LMI) was created in response to the July 23, 2009 meeting between U.S. Secretary of State Hillary Clinton and the Foreign Ministers of the Lower Mekong Countries, Cambodia, Laos, Thailand and Vietnam, in Phuket, Thailand. The Ministers agreed to enhance cooperation in the areas of environment, health, education, and infrastructure development. Since then, the five countries have sought to strengthen cooperation in these areas and build on their common interests.

In 2012 Burma/Myanmar became the sixth country to join LMI, receiving its first English Language Fellow in September 2013. LMI serves as a platform to integrate regional cooperation and promote development across six pillars: Agriculture, which works with farmers on food security and aquaculture; Connectivity, which focuses on communication infrastructure and lines of communication between LMI and other ASEAN countries; Education, which offers educational opportunities to youth and English language training to government officials; Energy, which seeks to increase energy security and develop renewable sources of energy; Environment, which strives to increase access to safe drinking water and mitigate the risks associated with water-related extreme events; and Health, which supports policies and programs that improve public health.

In 2020, the LMI was incorporated into the new Mekong-U.S. Partnership.
