= Geoffrey Onyeama =

Nigerian politician (born 1956)

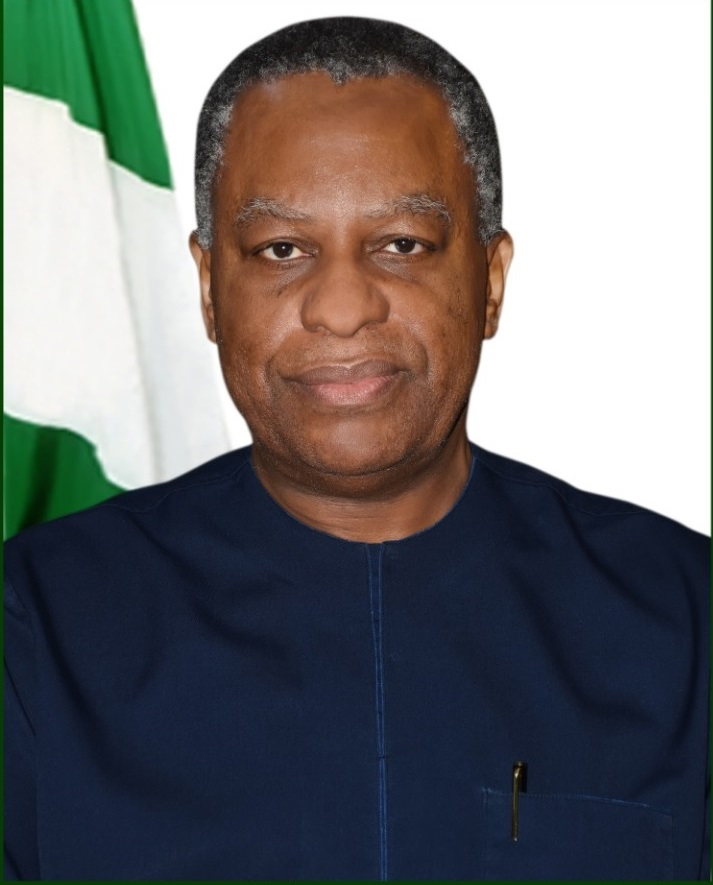
- Geoffrey K. J. Onyeama

Minister for Foreign Affairs
- In office 11 November 2015 – 29 May 2023
- President: Muhammadu Buhari
- Preceded by: Aminu Bashir Wali
- Succeeded by: Yusuf Tuggar

Deputy Director General of WIPO
- In office January 2009 – November 2015

Personal details
- Born: 2 February 1956 (age 70) Enugu, Eastern Region, British Nigeria (now in Enugu State, Nigeria)
- Party: All Progressives Congress
- Parent: Charles Onyeama (father)
- Relatives: Dillibe Onyeama (brother)
- Education: Columbia University; St John's College, Cambridge; London School of Economics
- Occupation: Politician; diplomat

Geoffrey Jideofor Kwusike Onyeama (born 2 February 1956) is a Nigerian diplomat and politician who served as the minister for foreign affairs of Nigeria from November 2015 to May 2023. He was appointed minister by President Muhammadu Buhari.

== Early life and education ==
Onyeama was born to the family of Nigerian jurist Charles Onyeama. His family has links to the Nigerian chieftaincy system; his grandfather, Onyeama of Eke, was a paramount chief in Colonial Igboland.

Onyeama holds a Bachelor of Arts (B.A) degree in political science from Columbia University in 1977 and a Bachelor of Arts (B.A) degree in law from St John's College, Cambridge, in 1980. He holds a Master of Law (LL.M) from the London School of Economics and Political Science in 1982 and a Master of Arts (M.A) in Law from St John's College, Cambridge in 1984. Onyeama was admitted as a Barrister-at-Law of the Supreme Court of Nigeria in 1983 and was also called to the English Bar at Gray's Inn in 1981.

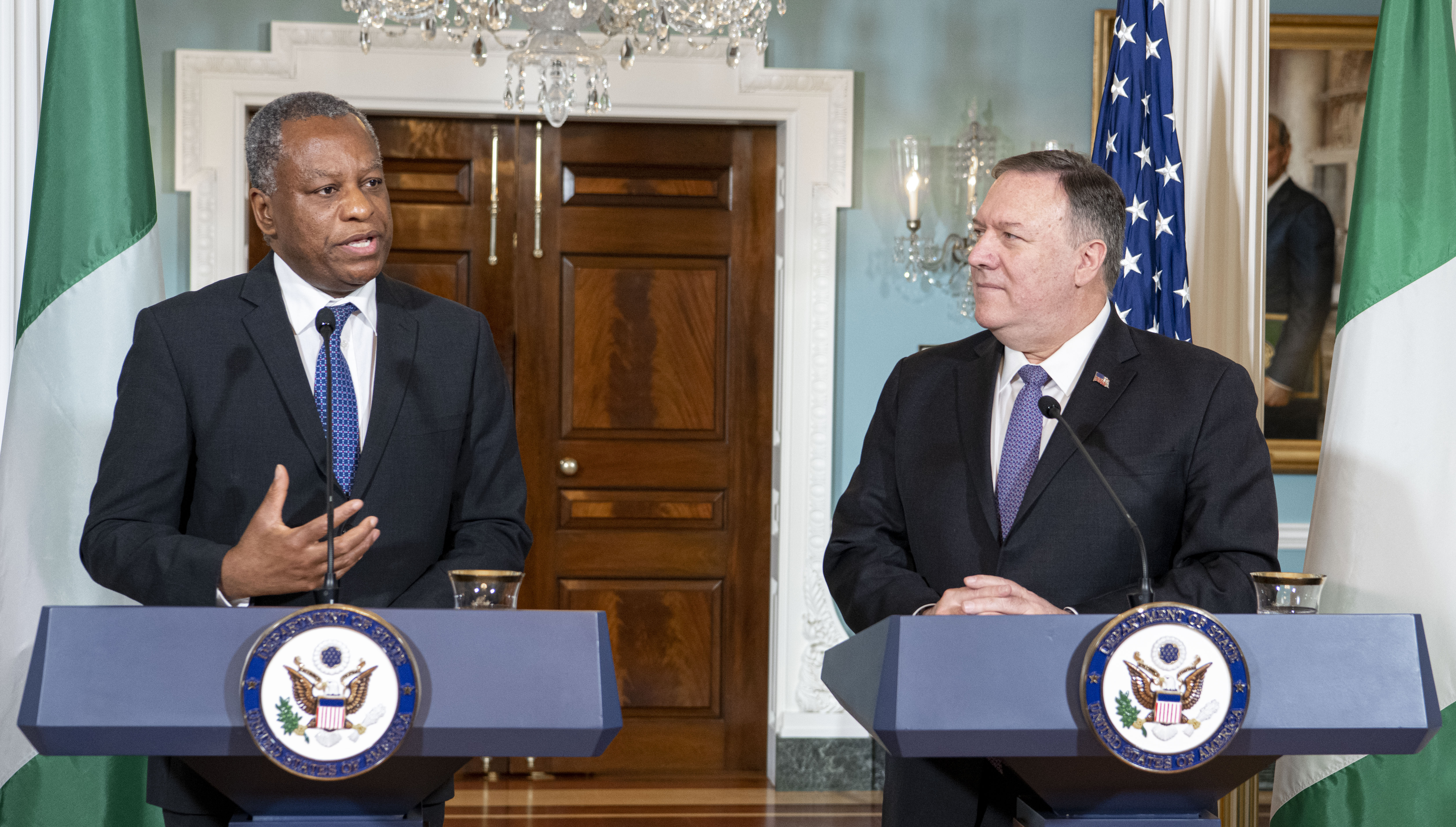
Onyeama speaks with U.S. Secretary of State Michael R. Pompeo at a press conference at the Department of State in Washington, D.C., on February 4, 2020.

== Career ==
Onyeama began his career as a research officer in the Nigerian Law Reform Commission Lagos from 1983 to 1984. He then worked as a lawyer with Mogboh and Associates in Enugu, Nigeria from 1984 to 1985. In 1985, he joined the World Intellectual Property Organization (WIPO) as an assistant programme officer for development cooperation and external relations, Bureau for Africa and Western Asia. He rose through the ranks at the WIPO to become deputy director general for the development sector in 2009. In November 2015 he was appointed Nigeria's minister of foreign affairs by President Muhammadu Buhari.

== Personal life ==
Onyeama is married and has three children. His current wife is Sulola, with whom Onyeama has two children. Previously, Onyeama was married to Christian Onoh's daughter, Nuzo Onoh, who is an author and the first African recipient of the Bram Stoker Lifetime Achievement Award, and they have a daughter together.

On 19 July 2020, Onyeama went into medical isolation, after announcing that he had tested positive for COVID-19. In late August 2020, Onyeama recovered from COVID-19 coronavirus disease; and went back to his leadership service as HMFA: Honourable Minister for Foreign Affairs at Nigeria's Ministry of Foreign Affairs.

Author Dillibe Onyeama (1951–2022) was his brother.

== See also ==
- List of current foreign ministers
- Cabinet of Nigeria
