= Laura Stone =

American diplomat

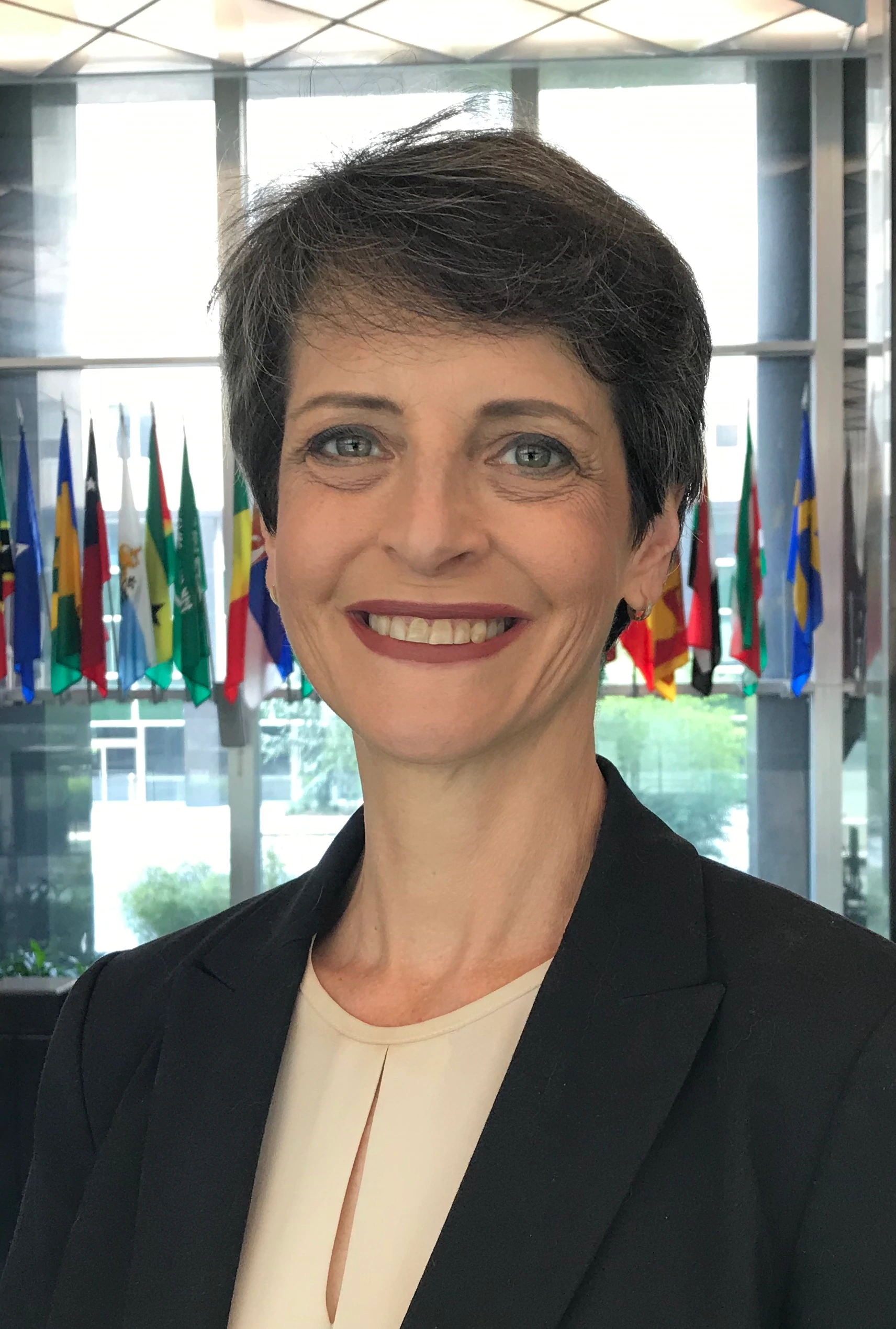

United States Ambassador to the Marshall Islands
- In office July 12, 2024 – January 12, 2026
- President: Joe Biden; Donald Trump
- Preceded by: Roxanne Cabral

Personal details
- Spouse: Mark Baxter Lambert
- Education: Cornell University (BA); Oxford University (MPhil)

Laura Merritt Stone is a retired American diplomat who had served ambassador to the Marshall Islands.

== Early life and education ==
Stone obtained her Bachelor of Arts from Cornell University and her Master of Philosophy from Oxford University.

== Career ==
Stone is a career member of the Senior Foreign Service, with the rank of Minister-Counselor. Currently, she serves as the Deputy Coordinator of the Secretary of State's Office of COVID-19 Response and Health Security.

Previously, Stone was the Deputy Assistant Secretary for India, Nepal, Sri Lanka, Bangladesh, Bhutan, and Maldives. She also served in the office of the Under Secretary of State for Economic Growth, Energy, and the Environment, as well as Acting Deputy Assistant Secretary for China, Taiwan, Hong Kong, and Mongolia. She worked in places like Beijing, Bangkok, Tokyo, and Hanoi. Other assignments in the State Department include roles in the Bureau of Public Affairs, Bureau of Intelligence and Research, and Bureau of East Asian and Pacific Affairs.

Stone also worked in the Office of the Secretary of Defense.

=== Ambassador to the Marshall Islands ===
On July 11, 2023, President Joe Biden nominated Stone to be the U.S. ambassador to the Marshall Islands. Her nomination was confirmed by the United States Senate on May 2, 2024. She arrived in Majuro on July 9 and presented her credentials to President Hilda Heine on July 12. She ending a distinguished 35-year diplomatic career on January 12, 2026.

== Awards and recognition ==
Stone has received several State Department awards, such as the Cordell Hull Award.

== Personal life ==
Stone speaks Chinese. She is married to Office of China Coordination chief Mark Baxter Lambert.
