= A. Doak Barnett =

American journalist and political scientist

Arthur Doak Barnett (October 8, 1921, Shanghai – March 17, 1999 Washington, D.C.) was an American journalist, political scientist, and public figure who wrote about the domestic politics and the foreign relations of China and United States-China relations. He published more than 20 academic and public interest books and edited still others. Barnett's parents were missionaries in China, and Barnett used his Chinese language ability while travelling widely in China as a journalist before 1949. He grounded his journalism and his scholarship in exact detail and clear language. Starting in the 1950s, when there were no formal diplomatic relations between the United States and the People's Republic of China, he organized public outreach programs and lobbied the United States government to put those relations on a new basis.

Barnett taught at Columbia University from 1961–1969, then went to the Brookings Institution in 1969. In 1982, he was named the George and Sadie Hyman Professor of Chinese Studies at the Paul H. Nitze School of Advanced International Studies at the Johns Hopkins University in Washington, D.C.

== Early life and education ==
Barnett was the son of Eugene and Bertha Barnett. His father worked in Shanghai for the Chinese National YMCA and the family did not return to the United States until 1936. The young Barnett graduated summa cum laude from Yale University in 1942, with a degree in international relations. He spent World War II in the United States Marine Corps, advancing from private to lieutenant while serving in the United States and in the Pacific.

After World War II, he earned an M.A. degree in international relations at Yale University and a certificate from the Yale Institute of Far Eastern Languages in 1947.

== Career ==
In 1947, Barnett returned to Asia as a fellow of the Institute of Current World Affairs, and as a correspondent for Chicago Daily News. He traveled throughout China, starting from Xi'an, in the Northwest, where he interviewed the warlord Yan Xishan; then lived for a time in a poor village in Sichuan; and rode on horseback to the regions of western Sichuan inhabited by Tibetans, sometimes finding that hard-boiled eggs were the only sanitary food. He chronicled the devastating conflicts of the Chinese Civil War. Chiang Kai-shek and his Nationalists were pitted against Mao's People's Liberation Army, which he saw enter Peiping in 1949. In 1950-51, Barnett served as a public affairs officer in the American Consulate in Hong Kong, helping to analyze China's internal politics and to draft recommendations for propaganda campaigns. Beginning in 1952, he spent four years as an associate of the American Universities Field Staff, writing accounts of current developments in China from a base in Hong Kong.

Barnett was program director for the Ford Foundation in Hong Kong in the late 1950s and channeled substantial funds to research projects on China at a time when many foundations did not support them because of the hostile politics of the McCarthy era.

Barnett joined the faculty of Columbia University as professor of government in 1961. In 1966, he was a principal witness for an extensive Congressional review of China policy conducted by Senator J. William Fulbright, chairman of the Senate Foreign Relations Committee. At that time China was regarded primarily as an enemy, particularly for its support of North Vietnamese expansion. China was feared as a revolutionary force seeking to topple democratic governments, which would fall like a row of dominoes. Barnett told the committee that China's initial reaction to American overtures was "almost certain to be negative and hostile and that any changes in our posture will create some new problems, but ... initiatives on our part clearly are required if we are to work, however slowly, toward the long term goal of a more stable, less explosive situation in Asia and to explore the possibilities of trying to moderate Peking's policies." In 1969, Barnett moved to the School of Advanced International Studies (SAIS) at the Johns Hopkins University, where he remained until he retired in 1989.

During these years, he worked to enrich the public debate and encourage scholarly research on China. He joined with other academics such as Robert Scalapino, Lucian Pye, John K. Fairbank, and Richard L. Walker to organize the National Committee on U.S.-China Relations. and was a key player in the Joint Committee on Contemporary China, organized under the American Council of Learned Societies. He was among those who supported the establishment of the Universities Service Center in Hong Kong. The Center hosted so-called "China watchers" from around the world at a time when Americans were not allowed into the People's Republic. He also served on the editorial board of China Quarterly from 1960 to 1982.

In Washington, D.C., Barnett lobbied Congress and presidents to end China's isolation. In an interview with The New York Times shortly before his death, Barnett recalled a private meeting he attended between Richard Nixon and China scholars in 1969, saying, "I always felt that Nixon was the guy, because of his background...I am not sure the Democrats would have been capable of taking a major step toward China because of the fear of being clobbered". He coined the formula "containment without isolation" to describe a diplomatic opening that would still recognize China as a danger. In 1974 Barnett noted that Americans tended to shape their views of China "to fit their own preconceptions and mood of the moment, with minimal understanding of the realities of the situation." In the late 1970s, he supported President Jimmy Carter 's drive to follow Nixon's 1972 breakthrough with formal diplomatic recognition of China. In the early 1980s he advised against the sale of modernized jet fighters to the Republic of China on Taiwan, a position that was followed in the presidency of Ronald Reagan.

Along with his public and policy advocacy, Barnett steadily published scholarly works, including basic conference volumes.

== Personal life ==
Barnett met his wife, Jeanne Badeau Barnett, when she was a guide at the United Nations. Her father, John S. Badeau, also a missionary, was president of the American University in Cairo. They married in Hong Kong in 1954. They had two daughters, Katherine Barnett Ball of Richmond, Indiana, and Martha Barnett Schultz of Manassas, Virginia, and a son, Stewart Doak Barnett, of Raleigh, North Carolina.

His brother Robert W. Barnett was a United States diplomat who served as deputy assistant secretary of state for East Asia and the Pacific from 1963 to 1970.

== Legacy ==
China scholar Harry Harding wrote that Barnett, along with other leading China specialists of the 1960s, spoke both to a scholarly and a wider audience. His works, along with those of such scholars as Ezra Vogel, Franz Schurmann, and G. William Skinner had "remarkable staying power" and "continued to shape the research agenda and analytical vocabulary of the field." Barnett, along with other seniors scholars such as Lucian Pye, had "both the in-depth knowledge of specific places, bureaucracies, and individuals" and the ability to "move beyond the minutia and microcosm of 'my village' or 'my bureaucracy' to make sensible judgments about 'China'." The works of Barnett's generation, Harding continued, had several shortcomings, however. They tended to a high level of generality without considering variation from place to place, and focused on formal structures and official policies rather that how those institutions worked in practice or how they affected the lives of ordinary citizens. They also did not make enough historical, comparative, or theoretical comparisons.

Among Barnett's doctoral students were Kenneth Lieberthal and Michel Oksenberg, both of whom became academic scholars and government advisers. Oksenberg wrote that Barnett's personality was "deeply emotional about China yet carefully analytical; eternally optimistic yet realistic; adventursome yet cautious; committed yet balanced; modest yet authoritative; tolerant yet demanding; spontaneious yet meticulous; relaxed yet intense; gentle yet tough."

For over a decade since the early 2000s, an annual lecture has been held in Barnett's birthplace of Shanghai, known as the Barnett-Oksenberg Lecture on Sino-American Relations. The lecture is sponsored by the National Committee on U.S.-China Relations and the Shanghai Association of American Studies, and is supported by the Shanghai American Chamber of Commerce and sponsored by major corporations active in the Chinese market. The lecture, the only one of its kind delivered on Chinese soil, has been made by a number of very prominent Americans including President Jimmy Carter, and honors Barnett's critical influence on U.S.-China relations, and that of Michel Oksenberg, one of his students.

== Publications ==
- Communist China and Asia: Challenge to American Policy (New York: The Council on Foreign Relations, 1960)
- Communist China in Perspective (New York, Praeger, 1962)
- China on the Eve of Communist Takeover (New York, Praeger, 1963)
- Communist China: The Early Years, 1949-55 (New York: Praeger, 1964
- Communist Strategies in Asia: A Comparative Analysis of Governments and Parties New York, Praeger, 1964)
- China After Mao: With Selected Documents (Princeton University Press, 1967)
- Cadres, Bureaucracy, and Political Power in Communist China (New York, Columbia University Press, 1967). With Ezra Vogel.
- Chinese Communist Politics In Action (Seattle, University of Washington Press; Joint Committee on Contemporary China, 1969)
- United States and China: The Next Decade (New York, Praeger, for the National Committee on United States-China Relations, 1970), with Edwin O. Reischauer
- A New U.S. Policy Toward China, (Washington, D.C.: Brookings Institution, 1971)
- Frontiers of development administration (Durham, N.C., Duke University Press, 1970) with Fred W. Riggs
- Uncertain Passage: China's Transition to the Post-Mao Era 1974
- The United States, China and Arms Control, 1975, with Ralph N. Clough
- China Policy: Old Problems and New Challenges(Washington, D.C.: Brookings Institution, 1977)
- China and the Major Powers in East Asia (Washington, D.C.: Brookings Institution, 1977)
- China's Economy in Global Perspective (Washington, D.C.: Brookings Institution, 1981)
- United States Arms Sales: The China-Taiwan Tangle (Washington, D.C.: Brookings Institution, 1982)
- The Making of Foreign Policy in China: Structure and Process (Boulder : Westview Press; [Washington, D.C.]: Foreign Policy Institute, School of Advanced International Studies, Johns Hopkins University, 1985)
- Modernizing China: Post-Mao reform and development ( Boulder: Westview Press; SAIS China Forum, Edwin O. Reischauer Center for East Asian Studies, School of Advanced International Studies, Johns Hopkins University, 1986) with Ralph N Clough;
- China's Far West: Four Decades of Change (Boulder: Westview Press, 1993)
