= Chinese House =

Chinese House may refer to:

- Chinese House (Potsdam), a garden pavilion in Sanssouci Park in Potsdam, Germany
- Office of China Coordination, a United States State Department foreign policy initiative
- Siheyuan, a traditional type of Chinese residence
