= Daniel H. Rosen =

American economist

- Born: New York City
- Other names: 荣大聂
- Education: University of Texas at Austin (BA), Georgetown University School of Foreign Service (MA)
- Occupation: China specialist
- Employer: Rhodium Group

Daniel H. Rosen (born 1967) is an American business executive, academic and author. He is a specialist on the Chinese economy.

== Education ==
Rosen was born in New York City. He holds a BA in Asian studies and economics from the University of Texas at Austin and a MA from Georgetown University School of Foreign Service.

== Career ==
Rosen is a partner at Rhodium Group, LLC, a New York-based advisory firm which he co-founded in 2003, a visiting fellow at the Peterson Institute for International Economics, and an adjunct professor at Columbia University, where he has taught a graduate seminar on the Chinese marketplace at the School of International and Public Affairs since 2001. Rosen is also a member of the Council on Foreign Relations and board member of the National Committee on U.S.-China Relations.

Prior to his work with Rhodium, he was Senior Advisor for International Economic Policy at the United States National Economic Council and National Security Council from 2000–2001, where he worked on China's accession to the World Trade Organization.

Rosen is a participant of the Task Force on U.S.-China Policy convened by Asia Society's Center on US-China Relations.

== Publications ==
=== Reports ===
- An American Open Door?: Maximizing the Benefits of Chinese Investment in the US (2011, Asia Society)
- The Implications of China-Taiwan Economic Liberalization (2010, Peterson Institute)
- Prospects for a US-Taiwan Free Trade Agreement (2004, Peterson Institute)
- Roots of Competitiveness: China's Evolving Agriculture Interests (with Scott Rozelle and Jikun Huang, 2004, Peterson Institute)
- The New Economy and APEC (with Catherine L. Mann, 2002, Peterson Institute)
- Behind the Open Door: Foreign Enterprises in the Chinese Marketplace (1998, Peterson Institute and The Council on Foreign Relations)
- Powering China (with Dan Esty, 1995, The Rockefeller Brothers Foundation)

=== Articles ===
- How America Should React to China’s Economic Slowdown, Foreign Affairs, November 13, 2023 (co-authored with Logan Wright)
- How China’s Economic Slowdown Could Hurt the World, Foreign Affairs, April 10, 2023 (co-authored with Sophie Lu)
- China’s Economic Collision Course, Foreign Affairs, March 27, 2024 (co-authored with Logan Wright)
