= Michel Oksenberg =

American political scientist (1938–2001)

- Born: October 12, 1938
- Died: February 22, 2001 (aged 62)
- Education: Swarthmore College (BA); Columbia University (MA, PhD)
- Scientific career
- Fields: Political science
- Workplaces: University of Michigan
- Thesis: Policy formulation in Communist China; the case of the mass irrigation campaign, 1957-58 (1969)
- Doctoral advisor: A. Doak Barnett
- Doctoral students: Jean C. Oi, David Shambaugh, Kenneth Lieberthal, Elizabeth J. Perry, Elizabeth Economy

Michel Charles Oksenberg (October 12, 1938 – February 22, 2001) was an American political scientist and China watcher who moved between academia and policy work. As a senior member of the National Security Council, he was closely involved in the normalization of U.S.-China relations undertaken during the administration of President Jimmy Carter, who said, "Mike Oksenberg changed my life—and changed the life of this country, and to some degree changed the life of every citizen of China."

== Academic career ==
Oksenberg was born in Antwerp, Belgium, but grew up in the United States, mostly in Florida. Oksenberg earned his B.A. from Swarthmore College in 1960, and his M.A. and Ph.D. in political science from Columbia University in 1963 and 1969, respectively. At Columbia, A. Doak Barnett, the son of China missionaries, kindled his interest in China.

Oksenberg began his career at Stanford University in 1966, moved to Columbia University in 1968, and then to the University of Michigan in 1973, where he was on the faculty for twenty years. He served as president of the East-West Center in Honolulu from 1992 to 1995, and then as senior fellow at the Asia-Pacific Research Center at Stanford until the time of his death. Oksenberg "trained more students in contemporary Chinese studies during the last 25 years" than any other scholar, and was active in facilitating access for western scholars to China in the post-Mao era.

His work focused on analyzing the political system of China and understanding China's policymaking process. He also studied China's behavior with regard to international treaties, and contributed insights on U.S.-China relations. He consistently called for a more thoughtful U.S. engagement in Asia, and pushed for more productive relations with China, saying, "China's cooperation is essential to address the problems that threaten humanity: environmental and health issues, agricultural production,... and so on. Its constructive engagement in regional issues (Korea, Indochina) is essential to attainment of regional stability. And it is not in America's interest for its China policy to drift far from that of Japan or Western Europe."

== Role in US-China relations ==
From 1977 to 1980, Oksenberg took a leave of absence from the University of Michigan to serve as a senior staff member on the National Security Council under the Carter administration, overseeing issues involving China and East Asia. Oksenberg encouraged the U.S. government to continue Nixon's policy of rapproachment with China. That was politically difficult since it required the United States to annul its mutual defense treaty with Taiwan. After an initial but less successful trip to Beijing in 1977 with Secretary of State Cyrus Vance, Oksenberg traveled with National Security Advisor Zbigniew Brzezinski to Beijing in early 1978, where they met with Leonard Woodcock, the head of the U.S. liaison office there, to lay the groundwork for establishing diplomatic ties between the two countries. On December 15, 1978, the United States announced that on January 1, 1979, it would recognize Beijing as the legitimate government in China, ending formal diplomatic relations with Taiwan, although the United States would still maintain informal ties with the island.

Oksenberg helped work out an intelligence-sharing arrangement with Chinese leader Deng Xiaoping on his visit to the United States in 1979. He also negotiated with China on assisting the Afghan resistance movement after the Soviet Union invaded Afghanistan in 1979.

== Personal life ==
Oksenberg was the brother of American philosopher Amélie Oksenberg and brother-in-law of the American philosopher Richard Rorty. He married the psychologist Lois Elinor Oksenberg (née Clarenbach) in 1963. The pair had two children.

== Selected publications ==
- China’s Developmental Experience (1973)
- Dragon and Eagle—United States-China Relations—Past and Future, co-author (1978)
- China’s Participation in the IMF, the World Bank, and GATT, co-author (1990)
- The Cultural Revolution, co-author (1981)
- Policy Making in China, co-author (1988)
- Beijing Spring, 1989: Confrontation and Conflict: The Basic Documents, co-author (1990)
- An Emerging China in a World of Interdependence: A Report to the Trilateral Commission, co-author (1994)
- Shaping U.S.-China Relations: A Long-Term Strategy, co-author (1997)
- China Joins the World: Progress and Prospects, co-editor (1998)
- A Century’s Journey: How the Great Powers Shape the World, co-author (1999)

== References and further reading ==
- Carter, Jimmy (2002), The United States and China: A President's Perspective: An address by Jimmy Carter at the Inaugural Oksenberg Lecture at Stanford on 6 May 2002 (PDF), archived from the original (PDF) on 2007-06-11.
- Goldstein, Steven M., Kenneth Lieberthal, Jean C. Oi and Andrew Walder (2001). "Michel Charles Oksenberg: In Memoriam" (PDF). The China Quarterly (166): 474–475. JSTOR 3451167.
- Trei, Lisa (2001), Leading China scholar Michel Oksenberg dies, Stanford News Service
- Lewis, Paul (24 February 2001), "Michel Oksenberg, 62, China Expert in Washington", New York Times.
