= Jean C. Oi =

American political scientist

Jean Chun Oi
- Education: Indiana University (B. A.); University of Michigan (M. A.); University of Michigan (Ph.D.)
- Spouse: Andrew G. Walder
- Scientific career
- Fields: Political science; China studies
- Workplaces: Lehigh University; Harvard University; Hong Kong University of Science and Technology; Stanford University
- Doctoral advisor: Allen S. Whiting; Michel Oksenberg
- Other academic advisors: Samuel Barnes; Robert Dernberger; Albert Feuerwerker; Martin King Whyte

Jean C. Oi (Chinese name: Chinese: 戴慕珍; pinyin: Dài Mùzhēn) is an American political scientist and expert in the politics of China. She is the William Haas Professor in Chinese Politics in the department of political science at Stanford University. She is also a senior fellow at the Freeman Spogli Institute for International Studies. She studies political economy and fiscal reform, particularly in rural China. Oi was president of the Association for Asian Studies between March 2022 and December 2023.

== Education ==
Oi holds a BA in Political Science and East Asian Languages and Literatures from Indiana University (1971). She then studied political science at the University of Michigan, earning an MA in 1975 and a PhD in 1983. Oi's dissertation committee was co-chaired by Allen S. Whiting and Michel Oksenberg, and the other members were Samuel Barnes, Robert Dernberger, Albert Feuerwerker, and Martin King Whyte.

== Career ==
In 1983, Oi joined the political science faculty at Lehigh University, and in 1987 she moved to Harvard University. In 1995 she joined the social science division at The Hong Kong University of Science and Technology, and in 1997 she became a professor of political science at Stanford University. She became the William Haas Professor in Chinese Politics in 2001, and a senior fellow at the Freeman Spogli Institute for International Studies in 2006. During the 2005–2006 school year, Oi was the MBA Class of 1962 Visiting Professor of Business Administration at Harvard Business School.

Oi has authored two books about Chinese political economy. Her first book, State and Peasant in Contemporary China: The Political Economy of Village Government, was published in 1989. State and Peasant in Contemporary China arose from Oi's PhD dissertation at the University of Michigan, combining research interviews and field work to study the interaction between peasant leaders and state officials, and in particular the relationship between power at the level of villages and higher regional powers. Summarizing Oi's findings, Edward Friedman wrote that she "concludes that the form of politics during China's imperial era, republican period, Maoist rule, and the present post-Mao reforms remained traditional, that is, personalistic, based on clientalistic relations," and that "Oi locates the cause of the traditionalistic continuity not in culture but in structural circumstances". Daniel Little called the book "highly insightful".

In 1999, Oi was the sole author of a second book: Rural China Takes Off: Institutional Foundations of Economic Reform. The book studies the actions and incentives of government officials in China at the local and regional levels, as drivers of economic success in rural China since the 1970s. The success of rural industry in China under the state socialist system appeared to present a paradox, and Oi used hundreds of interviews conducted over 10 years to demonstrate how the incentives for local officials shifted in ways that promoted rapid growth in rural areas. Oi also co-authored the 2013 book Syncretism: The Politics of Economic Restructuring and System Reform in Japan with Kenji E. Kushida and Kay Shimizu.

In 2019, a citation analysis by political scientists Hannah June Kim and Bernard Grofman identified Oi as one of the top 40 most cited women working as a political scientist at an American university. Oi has received numerous university-wide awards for teaching at Stanford, including being a Bass University Fellow in Undergraduate Education, and the Dean's Award for Distinguished Teaching. She has been cited in media outlets like The Washington Post, The New York Times, and The Wall Street Journal.

== Publications ==
=== Articles ===
- State and Peasant in Contemporary China: The Political Economy of Village Government (1989)
- "Fiscal Reform and the Economic Foundations of Local State Corporatism in China", World Politics (1992)
- "The Role of the Local State in China's Transitional Economy", The China Quarterly (1995)
- Rural China Takes Off: Institutional Foundations of Economic Reform (1999)
- Syncretism: The Politics of Economic Restructuring and System Reform in Japan, co-authored (2013)
