= Mark Baxter Lambert =

American diplomat

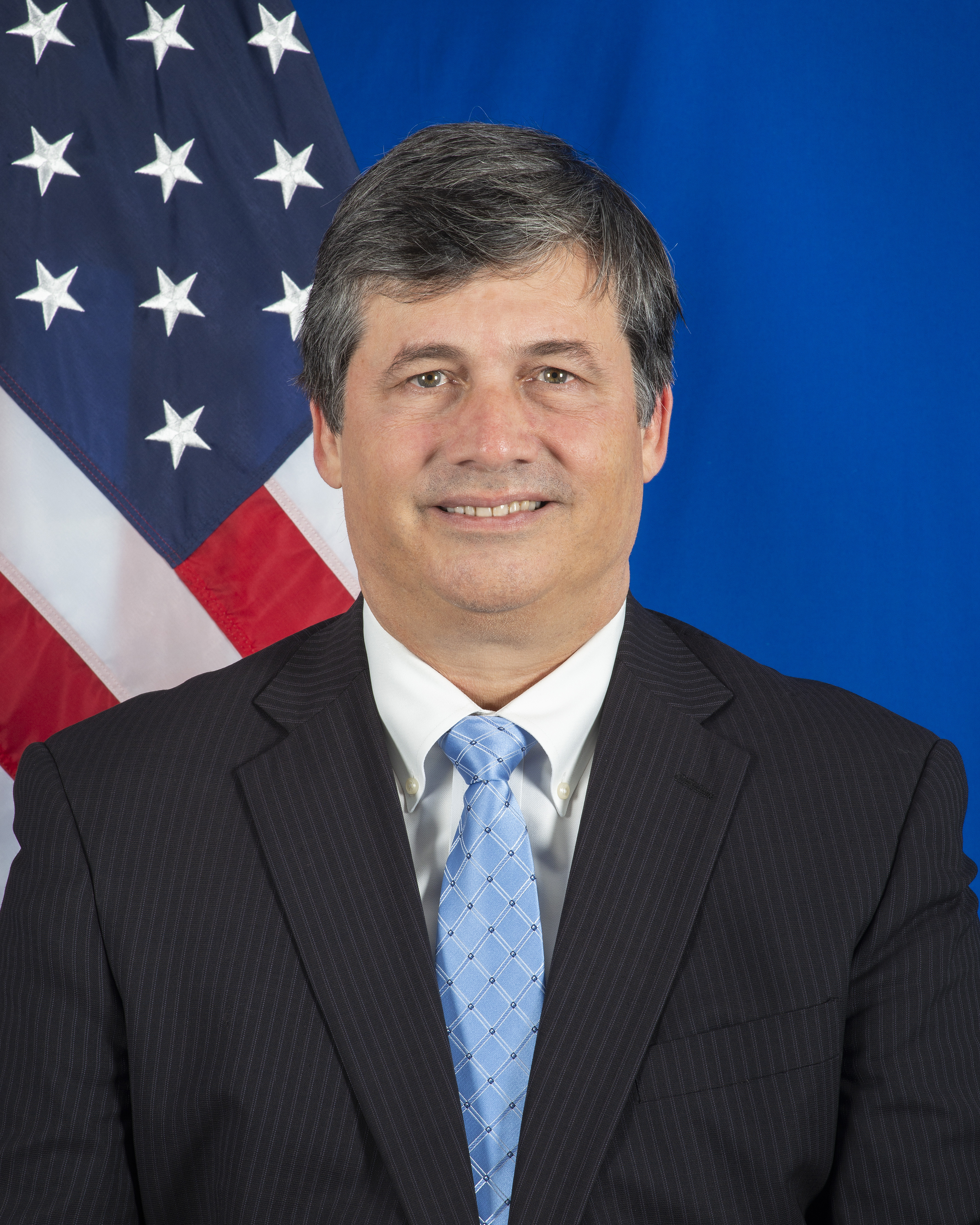

China Coordinator and Deputy Assistant Secretary of State for China and Taiwan, Bureau of East Asian and Pacific Affairs
- In office September 29, 2023 – January 20, 2025
- President: Joe Biden; Donald Trump
- Preceded by: Rick Waters

Personal details
- Spouse: Laura Stone
- Children: 2
- Parent: Malcolm Lambert (father)
- Education: Willamette University (BA), Baylor Law School (JD)
- Occupation: Diplomat

Mark Baxter Lambert is an American diplomat. He served as China Coordinator and Deputy Assistant Secretary of State for China and Taiwan in the Bureau of East Asian and Pacific Affairs at the US Department of State, heading the Office of China Coordination and Office of Taiwan Coordination, during the Biden administration.

== Early life and education ==
Lambert was born in Kentucky and grew up in Oregon. He holds a BA in history and political science from Willamette University and a JD from Baylor Law School (1987). Lambert's father Malcolm Lambert and sister Laura Lambert Brodie are both Baylor University alumni. His mother, Eunice Lambert, was a graduate of George Fox University. His wife is Laura Stone, a U.S. diplomat who served as the United States Ambassador to Marshall Islands.

== State Department career ==
Lambert joined the State Department in 1990 and between 1991 and 1993 worked at the U.S. Embassy in Colombia on human rights issues. After a two-year post in Japan he returned to Washington to work in the Office of Japanese Affairs on environmental and health issues.

Lambert began his first posting in Beijing in 2000 after two years of Chinese language training. He returned to Washington in summer 2003 for a year of Thai language training and was posted to Bangkok in 2004 to focus on US-Thailand political and military relations.

Lambert also served as Director of the Office of Korean Affairs and later Special Envoy for North Korean Affairs. In 2020 he was appointed a special envoy responsible for countering malign influence in the United Nations. Most recently he served as Deputy Assistant Secretary of State for Japan, Korea, Mongolia, Australia, New Zealand, and the Pacific Islands.

In September 2023, the State Department announced that Lambert would succeed Rick Waters as China Coordinator heading the Office of China Coordination and serve as Deputy Assistant Secretary of State in the Bureau of East Asian and Pacific Affairs.
