= Lieberthal =

Lieberthal is a surname. Notable people with the surname include:

- Kenneth Lieberthal (born 1943), director of the John L. Thornton China Center
- Mike Lieberthal (born 1972), Major League Baseball All Star catcher
