= Elizabeth Economy =

American political scientist

Elizabeth Charissa Economy
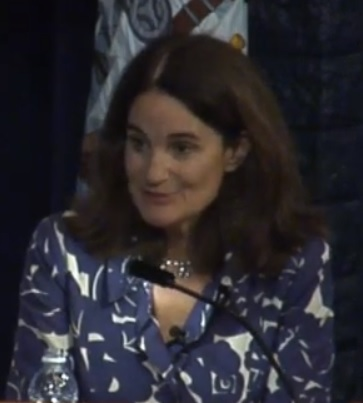
- Elizabeth Economy at Naval War College in 2016
- Born: December 27, 1962 (age 63)

Academic background
- Education: Swarthmore College; Stanford University; University of Michigan
- Thesis: Negotiating the Terrain of Global Climate Change Policy in the Soviet Union and China: Linking International and Domestic Decision-making Pathways (1994)
- Doctoral advisor: Michel Oksenberg, Kenneth Lieberthal

Academic work
- Discipline: Political science
- Institutions: Hoover Institution; Council on Foreign Relations

Elizabeth C. Economy (born 27 December 1962) is an American political scientist, foreign policy analyst, and expert on China's politics and foreign policy. She is the Hargrove Senior Fellow and co-chair of the Program on the US, China, and the World at the Hoover Institution. From 2021 to 2023, she served as the senior advisor for China in the United States Department of Commerce. Economy was previously at the Council on Foreign Relations, where she served as the C.V. Starr Senior Fellow and director for Asia Studies for over two decades.

== Education and career ==
Economy received her undergraduate degree from Swarthmore College, her Master of Arts from Stanford University and completed her PhD in Political Science at the University of Michigan.

Economy is an acclaimed author and expert on Chinese domestic and foreign policy. Her most recent book is The World According to China. She is also the author of The Third Revolution: Xi Jinping and the New Chinese State, which was shortlisted for the Lionel Gelber Prize for foreign affairs books, and By All Means Necessary: How China’s Resource Quest Is Changing the World with Michael Levi. Her book The River Runs Black: The Environmental Challenge to China’s Future was named one of the top fifty sustainability books by the University of Cambridge, won the 2005 International Convention on Asia Scholars Award for the best social sciences book published on Asia, and was listed as one of the top ten books of 2004 by The Globalist, as well as one of the best business books of 2010 by Booz Allen Hamilton’s Strategy+Business magazine. She also coedited China Joins the World: Progress and Prospects with Michel Oksenberg and The Internationalization of Environmental Protection with Miranda Schreurs. Her books have been translated into a dozen languages.

She serves as the East Asia book reviewer for Foreign Affairs.

Economy hosts China Considered, a podcast produced by the Hoover Institution that features conversations with policymakers, scholars, and activists on China’s evolving domestic and international roles. The show explores the forces shaping China’s trajectory and examines their implications for the global order.

She has taught at Columbia University, Johns Hopkins University's Paul H. Nitze School of Advanced International Studies, and the University of Washington's Jackson School of International Studies.

From 2008 to 2014, Economy served as a member and then Vice Chair of the World Economic Forum (WEF)'s Global Agenda Council on the Future of China. From 2014 to 2016, she served as a member of WEF's Global Agenda Council on the United States.

In 2008, Economy received an honorary doctor of laws degree from Vermont Law School.

=== Board memberships ===
Economy serves on the board of managers of Swarthmore College, as well as on the boards of the National Committee on US-China Relations and the National Endowment for Democracy. She is a member of the Aspen Strategy Group and the Council on Foreign Relations.

== Views and analysis ==
Economy asserts that as of 2020, the China model "has perhaps found the most adherents in Africa," citing Chinese Communist Party training seminars for influential African political parties including the Ethiopian People's Revolutionary Democratic Front and the Sudanese People's Liberation Movements.

== Personal life ==
Economy is the daughter of materials science researcher James Economy and Anastasia Economy. She was raised in San Jose, California. She married investment banker David Wah in 1994. They live in New York City and have three children.

== Publications ==
=== Books ===
- The Internationalization of Environmental Protection (Cambridge University Press, with Miranda Schreurs, 1997)
- China Joins the World: Progress and Prospects (Council on Foreign Relations Press, with Michel Oksenberg, 1999)
- The River Runs Black: The Environmental Challenge to China's Future (Cornell University Press, 2004)
- By All Means Necessary: How China's Resource Quest is Changing the World (Oxford University Press, 2014, with Michael Levi)
- The Third Revolution: Xi Jinping and the New Chinese State (Oxford University Press, 2018)
- The World According to China (Polity, 2021)

=== Articles ===
- America’s China Strategy Is Incomplete, Foreign Affairs, January 14, 2025 (co-authored with Melanie Hart)
- China’s Alternative Order, Foreign Affairs, April 23, 2024
- "The Game Changer: Coping With China's Foreign Policy Revolution." Foreign Affairs (2010): 142–152.
- "China's Imperial President: Xi Jinping Tightens His Grip." Foreign Affairs 93.6 (2014): 80–91.
- "History with Chinese Characteristics: How China's Imagined Past Shapes Its Present." Foreign Affairs. 96 (2017): 141–148.
- "China's New Revolution: The Reign of Xi Jinping." Foreign Affairs. 97 (2018): 60–74.
- "The China Model: Unexceptional Exceptionalism." Essay Series of the Hoover Institution: Human Prosperity Project (2020).
