= David Shambaugh =

American political scientist and Sinologist

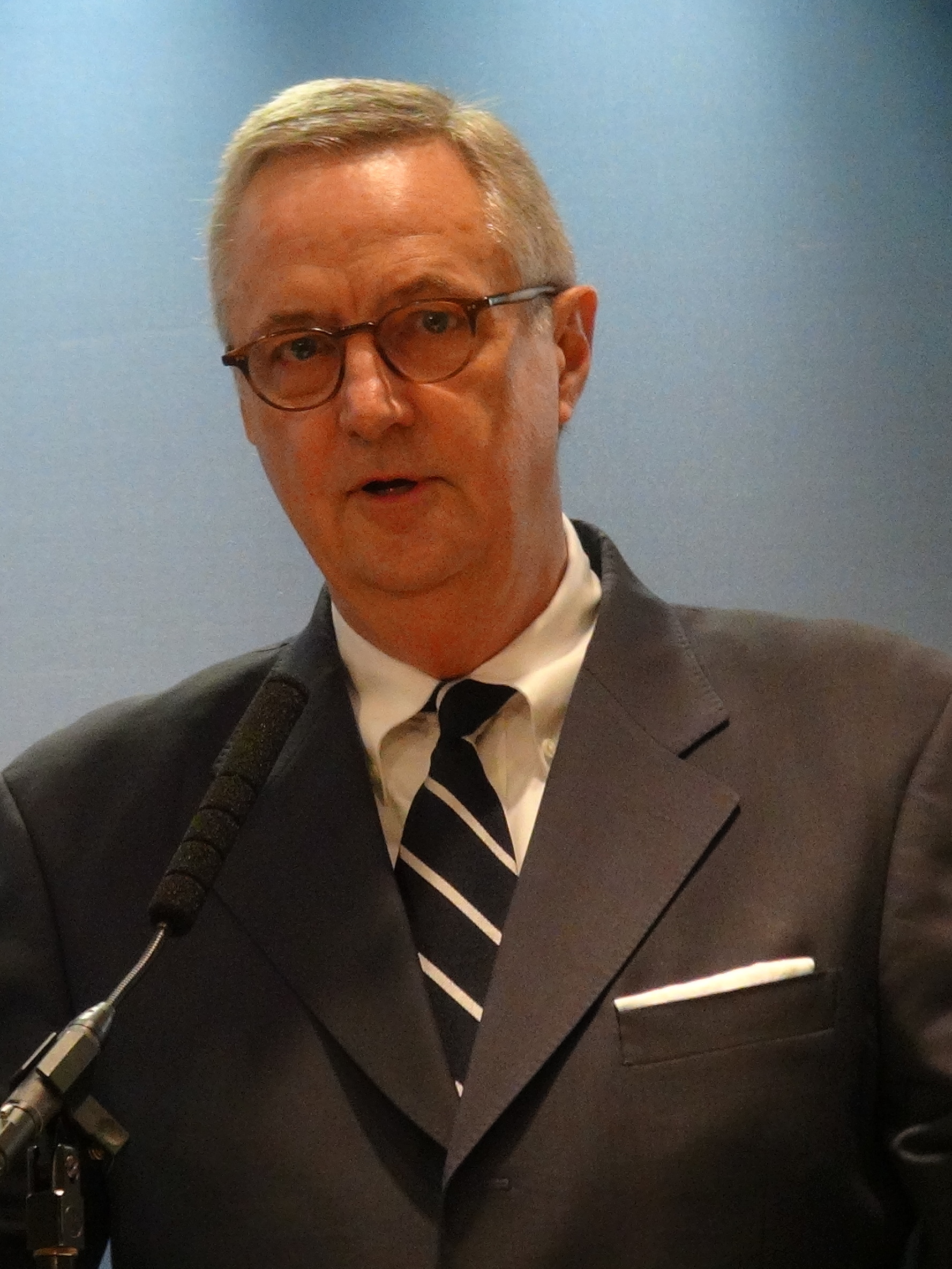
- Shambaugh speaking in 2015
- Born: David Leigh Shambaugh
- Citizenship: American
- Occupations: Political scientist; Sinologist; policy advisor
- Title: Gaston Sigur Professor of Asian Studies, Political Science & International Affairs; founding Director of the China Policy Program at the Elliott School of International Affairs at George Washington University (1996—)
- Board member of: National Bureau of Asian Research’s Board of Advisors; National Committee on U.S.-China Relations (2008—2014); American Hearing Research Foundation (2008—); Editorial Board of The Washington Quarterly and other academic journals

Academic background
- Education: Elliott School of International Affairs, George Washington University (BA in East Asian Studies) Paul H. Nitze School of Advanced International Studies, Johns Hopkins University (MA in International Affairs) University of Michigan (PhD in Political Science)
- Thesis: China's America Watchers' Images of the United States, 1972-1986 (1988)
- Doctoral advisor: Michel Oksenberg and Allen S. Whiting

Academic work
- Discipline: Political science, international relations, Chinese studies
- Sub-discipline: China's domestic politics; Contemporary Chinese history; China's foreign relations; China's military and security; U.S. foreign policy; international relations of Asia
- Institutions: Elliott School of International Affairs, George Washington University; School of Oriental & African Studies, University of London (1987-1996)
- Notable works: China Goes Global: The Partial Power (2013); China’s Future (2016); Where Great Powers Meet: America & China in Southeast Asia (2020); China’s Leaders from Mao to Now (2021); Breaking the Engagement: How China Won & Lost America (2025)

David Leigh Shambaugh (born January 18, 1953) is an American political scientist, Sinologist and policy advisor. He currently serves as the Gaston Sigur Professor of Asian Studies, Political Science, and International Affairs at George Washington University, where he is also the director of the China Policy Program at GW’s Elliott School of International Affairs. He is also a Distinguished Visiting Fellow at the Hoover Institution (2024—). He was previously a non-resident Senior Fellow at the Brookings Institution. Shambaugh served in the Department of State, and on the White House National Security Council staff during the presidency of Jimmy Carter. As an author, Shambaugh has authored 12 and edited 21 books, and over 200 scholarly articles and newspaper op-eds.

== Early life and education ==
Shambaugh is the youngest son of George E. Shambaugh, Jr., an otolaryngologist and founder of the American Hearing Research Foundation. He grew up in Illinois and attended boarding school in Arizona. His brother George E. Shambaugh III is also a physician at Emory University. Shambaugh earned his BA cum laude in East Asian Studies in 1977 from the Elliott School of International Affairs at George Washington University—where he now serves on the faculty. He received his MA in International Affairs in 1980 from Johns Hopkins University’s Paul H. Nitze School of Advanced International Studies (SAIS) and his PhD in Political Science from the University of Michigan in 1988, where he studied under Michel Oksenberg.

== Career ==
Shambaugh began his professional career as Program Associate and Acting Director of the Asia Program at the Woodrow Wilson Center in Washington DC (1986–87), before being appointed as Lecturer, Senior Lecturer, and Reader in Chinese Politics at the University of London’s School of Oriental and African Studies (SOAS), where he was on the faculty from 1987-1996. During this time, he also served as the Editor-in-Chief of the prestigious journal The China Quarterly (1991–96). In 1996 he left England and returned to the United States, when he was appointed as Professor of Political Science & International Affairs, and Director of the Sigur Center for Asian Studies at the Elliott School of International Affairs, George Washington University.

Regarded as an international authority on China, Shambaugh is a frequent media commentator and has acted as an advisor to the United States government and several private foundations and corporations. He is a member of the Council on Foreign Relations and other professional organizations. His books China Goes Global (2013) and China’s Future (2016) were selected by The Economist as one of the best books of the year (2014, 2016). In 2015, researchers at the China Foreign Affairs University named him the second-most influential China expert in the United States, behind David M. Lampton. Shambaugh has given testimony before the US Senate and House of Representatives, the UK House of Commons, and the Canadian Parliament. He has been a visiting professor or scholar in Australia, Austria, Brazil, China, Denmark, Germany, India, Italy, Japan, Hong Kong, New Zealand, Norway, Portugal, Russia, Singapore, South Korea, and Taiwan.

Shambaugh is a member of the Task Force on U.S.-China Policy convened by Asia Society's Center on US-China Relations. He holds a continuing appointment as a Distinguished Visiting Fellow to the Hoover Institution at Stanford University. He was previously twice selected as a Fellow and Distinguished Fellow to the Woodrow Wilson Center for two terms (2002-2003, 2023-2024).

== Bibliography ==
=== Books ===
- The Making of a Premier: Zhao Ziyang's Provincial Career (1984)
- Beautiful Imperialist (1991)
- Chinese Foreign Policy: Theory and Practice (1994)
- Deng Xiaoping: Portrait of a Chinese Statesman (1995)
- China's Military in Transition (1997)
- China's Military Faces the Future (1999)
- Is China Unstable: Assessing the Factors (2000)
- The Modern Chinese State (2000)
- Modernizing China's Military: Progress, Problems, and Prospects (2002)
- The Odyssey of China's Imperial Art Treasures (2005)
- Power Shift: China & Asia's New Dynamics (2005)
- China-Europe Relations (2007)
- China Watching: Perspectives from Europe, Japan, and the United States (2007)
- American and European Relations with China (2008)
- China's Communist Party: Atrophy & Adaptation (2008)
- International Relations of Asia (2008, 2014, 2022)
- Charting China's Future: Domestic and International Challenges (2011)
- China Goes Global: The Partial Power (Oxford University Press, 2013)
- The China Reader, Sixth Edition (2016)
- China's Future (2016)
- China and the World (2020).
- Where Great Powers Meet: America and China in Southeast Asia (2020).
- China's Leaders: From Mao to Now (2021, 2023)
- Breaking the Engagement: How China Won & Lost America (2025)

=== Selected articles ===
- "Containment or Engagement of China? Calculating Beijing's Responses." International Security 21, no. 2 (1996): 180-209. doi:10.2307/2539074
- "China's Military Views the World: Ambivalent Security" International Security 24, no. 3 (1999): 52-79.
- "China's International Relations Think Tanks: Evolving Structure and Process." The China Quarterly 171 (2002): 575-596. doi:10.1017/S0009443902000360
- "China And the Korean Peninsula: Playing for the Long Term" Washington Quarterly (2003). doi:10.1162/01636600360569685
- "China Engages Asia: Reshaping the Regional Order" International Security 29, no. 3 (2004): 64-99. JSTOR 4137556
- "China’s Propaganda System: Institutions, Processes and Efficacy." The China Journal, No. 57 (January 2007). JSTOR 20066240
- "China’s ‘Quiet Diplomacy’: The International Department of the Chinese Communist Party," China: An International Journal, Vol. 5, No. 1 (March 2007).
- "Training China’s Political Elite: The Party School System," The China Quarterly (December 2008). doi:10.1017/S0305741008001148
- "China’s Moment," TIME, September 28, 2009.
- "Coping with a Conflicted China" The Washington Quarterly 34, no. 1 (2011): 7-27. doi:10.1080/0163660X.2011.537974
- "The Illusion of Chinese Power" The National Interest (2014)
- "The Coming Chinese Crack-Up" Wall Street Journal 6 (2015): 382.
- "China's Soft-Power Push: The Search for Respect." Foreign Affairs 94, no. 4 (2015): 99-107. JSTOR 24483821
- "US-China Rivalry in Southeast Asia: Power Shift or Competitive Coexistence?." International Security 42, no. 4 (2018): 85-127. doi:10.1162/isec_a_00314
- "China’s External Propaganda Work: Missions, Messengers, Mediums," Party Watch Annual Report 2018
- "The Southeast Asian Crucible," Foreign Affairs, December 17, 2020.
- "The Chinese Communist Party at 100," The Montreal Review, July 2021.
- "Becoming a Ganbu: China’s Cadre Training School System," Journal of Contemporary China, Vol. 32, Issue 142 (July 2023). doi:10.1080/10670564.2022.2109008
- "The Evolution of American China Studies: Coming Full Circle?" Journal of Contemporary China, Volume 33, Issue 146 (March 2024). doi:10.1080/10670564.2023.2237918
