= Yuhua Wang =

Chinese-American political scientist

- 王裕华
- Citizenship: United States
- Education: Peking University (BA, MA), University of Michigan (PhD)
- Occupation: Political scientist
- Employer: Harvard University

Yuhua Wang (Chinese: 王裕华) is a Chinese-American political scientist who researches comparative politics, taking the history of China as a sample to explore the significance of the construction of "state capacity" for state and social development. His 2022 book, The Rise and Fall of Imperial China, won the Luebbert Best Book Award in Comparative Politics from the American Political Science Association. Currently, he is the Ford Foundation Professor of Modern China Studies in the Department of Government at Harvard University whose research focuses on the politics of state-building. Wang was named a Harvard College professor in 2025.

== Biography ==
Wang received his Bachelor's degree and Master's degree from Peking University in 2003 and 2006, and Ph.D. in political science from the University of Michigan in 2011 under the supervision of Kenneth Lieberthal. From 2011 to 2015, Wang was assistant professor of political science at the University of Pennsylvania. Wang has been teaching at Harvard since 2015.

== Publications ==
Wang's research shows that China’s younger generation who did not witness the 1989 Tiananmen Square protests and massacre are still influenced by it if their parents discuss political issues at home. Living under a repressive government, Chinese parents tell their children not to trust leaders.

=== Monographs ===
- The Rise and Fall of Imperial China: The Social Origins of State Development. (Princeton Studies in Contemporary China, Princeton University Press, 2022).
- Tying the Autocrat’s Hands: The Rise of the Rule of Law in China. (Cambridge Studies in Comparative Politics, Cambridge University Press, 2015).

=== Edited volumes ===
- China in the World. (Special issue of Studies in Comparative International Development, Springer, 2021).
