= Chong-Sik Lee =

American political scientist (1931–2021)

- Born: July 30, 1931; Anju, Heian'nan Province, Korea, Empire of Japan
- Died: August 17, 2021 (aged 90); Philadelphia, Pennsylvania
- Awards: Woodrow Wilson Foundation Award (1974)

Academic background
- Education: University of California, Los Angeles; University of California, Berkeley (PhD, 1961)

Academic work
- Discipline: Political scientist
- Institutions: University of Pennsylvania; Kyung Hee University; Korea University; Yonsei University

Korean name
- Hangul: 이정식
- Hanja: 李庭植
- RR: I Jeongsik
- MR: I Chŏngsik

Chong-Sik Lee (Korean: 이정식; July 30, 1931 – August 17, 2021) was a Korean American political scientist specializing in East Asian studies.

Together with his co-author Robert A. Scalapino, he won the 1974 Woodrow Wilson Foundation Award of the American Political Science Association for the best book on government, politics or international affairs.

== Early life ==
Lee was born on July 30, 1931, in Anju, Korea, Empire of Japan. He was the oldest son of a primary school teacher. When he was three years old, he moved to Manchuria (then Manchukuo). He spent a number of years in his childhood in Manchuria, in Liaoyang and Tieling. After the liberation of Korea in 1945, his family was stranded in Liaoyang. His father went missing in March 1946, when he was 14 years old, making him the eldest male in the house. His family eventually managed to return to their hometown in 1948, which was then in North Korea. Lee never learned what had happened to his father.

=== Korean War ===
His family escaped to Seoul in South Korea in 1950. Around the outbreak of the Korean War, he began training to join the National Defense Corps (which later became involved in the National Defense Corps incident). Between 1951 and 1953, he worked in the Advanced Allied Translator and Interpreter Section (ADVATIS) as a translator. Around this time, he interrogated Chinese prisoners of war.

Lee had never graduated from middle school, but independently searched for learning opportunities constantly. During the war, he took classes at Shinheung College and Kyung Hee University. He was never able to graduate from either school, although Kyung Hee eventually awarded him an honorary bachelor's degree in October 2014. He later claimed that they had first offered him an honorary doctorate, which he declined, as he already had a doctorate. Instead, he asked for the degree that he had originally wanted.

Lee also had an early talent for languages. He learned Chinese and Japanese while doing odd jobs. When the Korean War broke out in June 1950, he picked up English through a mixture of practice and independent study. He improved his writing and grammar by writing diaries in English and asking American soldiers for help in revising his writing. He later wrote an article about his method for learning other languages well in 1995.

His intelligence and discipline was noticed by the Americans. After the war died down, he was allowed to go to the United States in January 1954 to study.

=== Studying in the United States ===
In 1954, Lee entered the University of California, Los Angeles (UCLA), making him one of the first Korean Americans to do so. During this time, he worked as a dishwasher to earn his living expenses. He earned both a bachelor's and master's degree from the school, and was accepted into the PhD in Political Science program at the University of California, Berkeley in 1957. His knack for languages caught the attention of Robert A. Scalapino, who had been planning to write a book on communism in East Asia around that time. Together, they began extensively researching Korean and other East Asian history. After 16 years of research, they eventually published Communism in Korea in 1973, which won a Woodrow Wilson Foundation Award. Communism in Korea was revised and reprinted as North Korea: Building of the Monolithic State in 2017.

== Career ==
=== Academic career ===
Lee joined the political science department of the University of Pennsylvania in 1963 and taught the university's first course in Korean studies. This course led to the foundation of a Korean studies department, which he actively participated in. By the time of his death, he was Emeritus Professor of Political Science. He was also Eminent Scholar at Kyung Hee University, Research Professor at Korea University, and the Yongjae Chair Professor at Yonsei University.

Lee's academic career includes works about Korea's history of communism, the division of the Korean Peninsula, and the origins of the Republic of Korea. He also researched major figures in modern Korean history such as Syngman Rhee, the first president of Korea; Lyuh Woon-hyung, a Korean politician and reunification activist in the 1940s; and Park Chung Hee, the third president of Korea, who seized power through a military coup. In particular, his works on Korea-Japan relations, communist movements in Manchuria, and the international relations of East Asia have been translated into many languages and are considered classics in East Asian studies.

Having devoted more than five decades to collecting historical records, Lee remarked, "By reading various records, I can gain insight as to why certain events occurred, what led to the occurrence of these events, and why historical figures took particular actions." Lee often told his students that "the true advancement of scholarship is only possible through a repetitive process of inquiry" and advised them to "accept new theories but to investigate with curiosity when these theories are unconvincing."

He was the author of The Politics of Korean Nationalism (University of California Press, 1963) and Kim Kyu-sik ui saengae (The Life of Kim Kyu-sik), Seoul: Shingu Munhwasa, 1974. Other books include Park Chung Hee: From Poverty to Power (KHU Press) and A 21st Century View of Post-Colonial Korea (Kyung Hee University Press). He has contributed to China Quarterly, Asian Survey, Journal of Asian Studies, Journal of International Affairs and other periodicals. Lee published an autobiography in 2020 that covered his life until 1974, but "left out the rest of the stories for next time".

Lee died at 9:15 am on August 17, 2021, in Philadelphia, at the age of 90, from complications from myelodysplastic syndrome.

== Awards ==
- 2011: Kyung-Ahm Prize, Kyung-Ahm Education & Cultural Foundation
- 1974: Woodrow Wilson Foundation Award of the American Political Science Association for the best book published in the United States in government, politics or international affairs
