= Rick Waters =

American foreign policy analyst

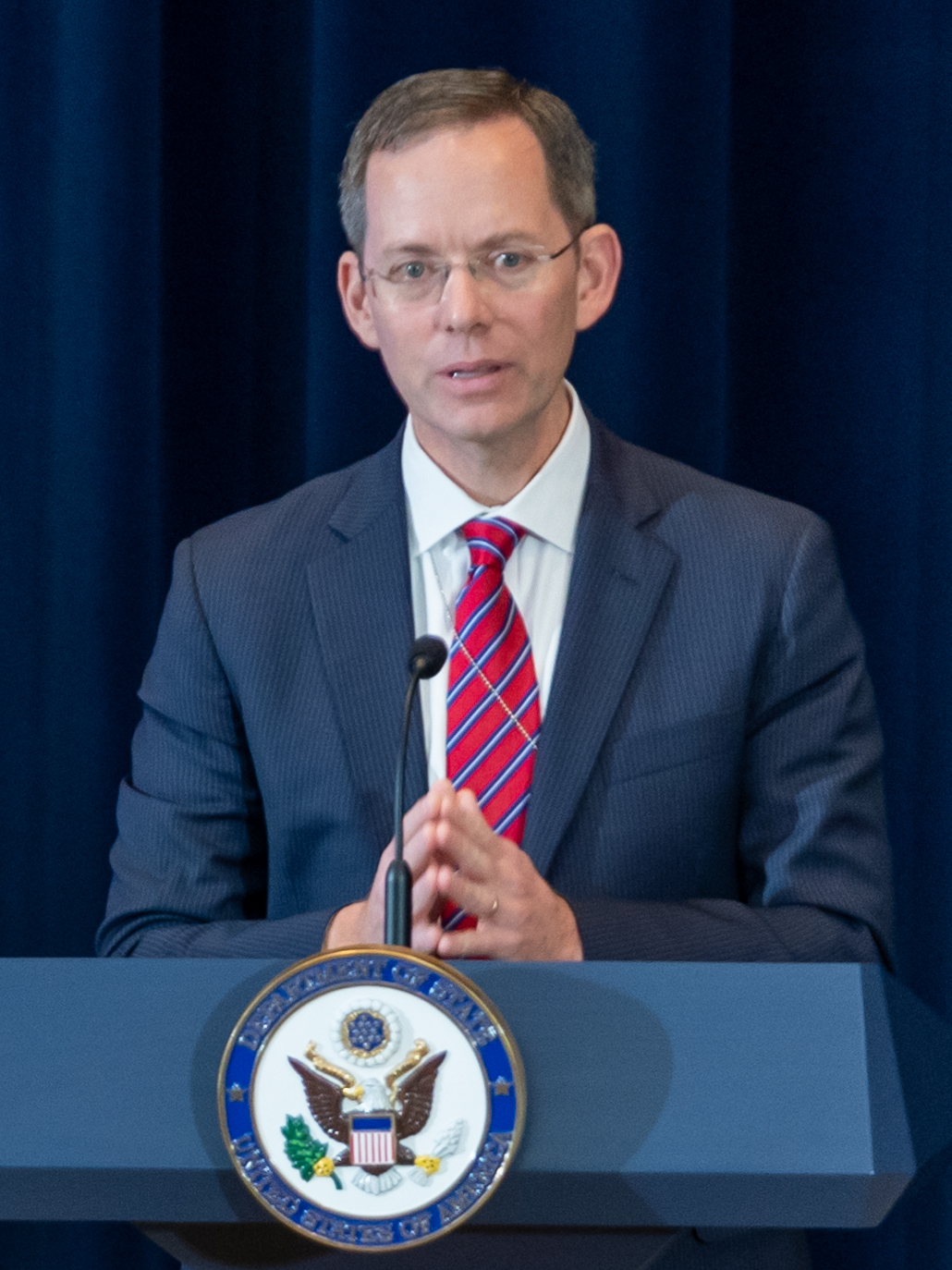
- Waters delivers remarks at a launch event for the Office of China Coordination at the U.S. Department of State on December 16, 2022.

China Coordinator and Deputy Assistant Secretary of State for China and Taiwan, Bureau of East Asian and Pacific Affairs
- In office 2021–2023
- President: Joe Biden
- Succeeded by: Mark Baxter Lambert

Personal details
- Education: Georgetown University (MS)
- Occupation: Diplomat

Rick Waters is an American foreign policy analyst and former diplomat, currently serving as managing director for China at the Eurasia Group. He previously served as China Coordinator and Deputy Assistant Secretary of State for China and Taiwan in the Biden administration.

== Early life and education ==
Waters holds a MS from Georgetown University's School of Foreign Service. He speaks Mandarin Chinese, Arabic, and Spanish.

== Career ==
Waters served at the Department of State for 27 years in various capacities, including as director for Israel, Egypt, Jordan and Palestinian Affairs at the U.S. National Security Council in the George W. Bush administration.

Waters joined the Eurasia Group as China practice lead in August 2023. He joined the Asia Society's Center for China Analysis as a senior fellow in July 2024.

In March 2024, Waters met with Taiwan's then-president Tsai Ing-wen as part of a D.C. think tank delegation.

Waters is married to Sarah Beran, a retired U.S. Foreign Service Officer.
