= Sarah M. Beran =

American diplomat

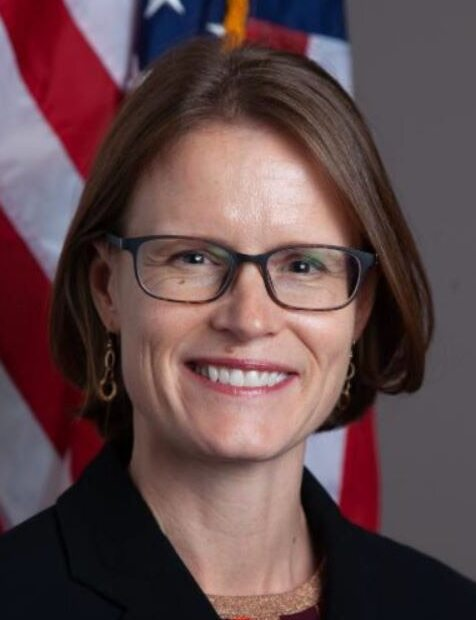

United States Chargé d'affaires to China
- In office January 18, 2025 – March 20, 2025
- President: Joe Biden; Donald Trump
- Preceded by: R. Nicholas Burns; Ambassador
- Succeeded by: Anny Vu; Chargé d’Affaires

Personal details
- Born: Washington
- Education: Claremont McKenna College

Sarah M. Beran is an American diplomat who served as United States Chargé d'affaires to the People's Republic of China from January to March 2025.

== Career ==
Beran is a career foreign service officer. She previously served as Special Assistant to the President and Senior Director for China and Taiwan Affairs on the National Security Council Staff at the White House. She participated in the U.S.-PRC Bilateral Counternarcotics Working Group Senior Official Meeting.

She also worked in the Office of Secretary of State Antony Blinken as Deputy Executive Secretary for the Indo-Pacific and was the Director of the Office of Chinese and Mongolian Affairs at the State Department's Bureau of East Asian and Pacific Affairs. Beran has held several overseas postings in Beijing, Islamabad, Jerusalem, Tunis, and Quito. Domestically, she has worked as Office Director for Economic Policy in East Asian and Pacific Affairs, Special Assistant to then-Secretary of State Condoleezza Rice, and Lebanon Desk Officer. Fluent in Mandarin, Arabic, and Spanish, Sarah joined the Foreign Service in 2002. She is a graduate of Claremont McKenna College and is originally from Washington State.

Following her retirement from the State Department in the spring of 2025, Beran joined the consultancy Macro Advisory Partners with the rank of partner. She was also named a senior fellow at the University of California at San Diego's 21st Century China Center.

Beran is married to Rick Waters, an American foreign policy analyst and retired U.S. Foreign Service Officer.

At the 60th anniversary gala dinner of the National Committee on United States–China Relations on November 10, 2026, she takes over Stephen Orlins as the nonprofit's new president.
