= Amélie Rorty =

Belgian-born American philosopher (1932–2020)

Amélie Oksenberg Rorty
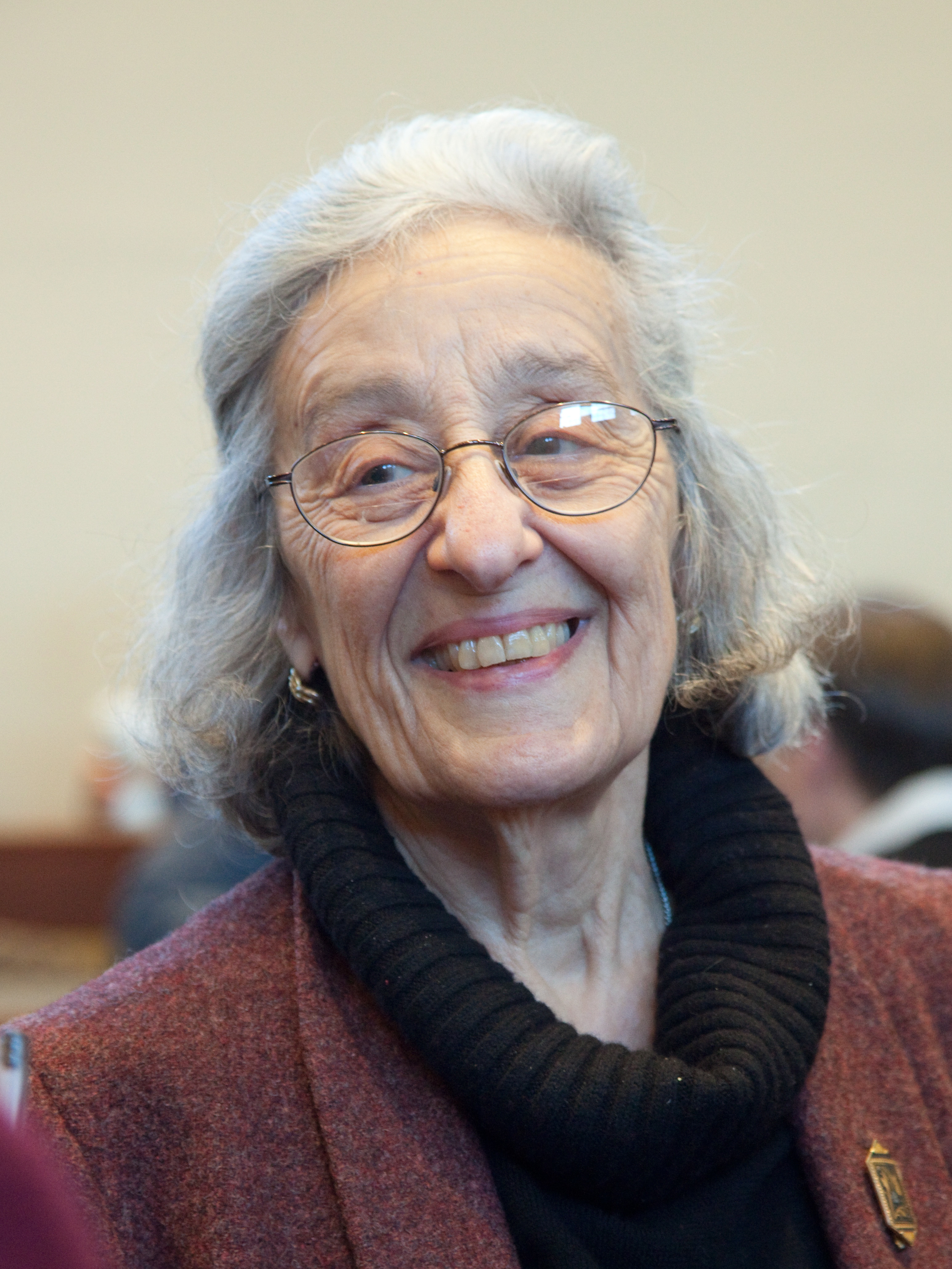
- Born: May 20, 1932; Belgium
- Died: September 18, 2020 (aged 88)

Education
- Education: University of Chicago; Yale University

Philosophical work
- Era: Contemporary philosophy
- Region: Western philosophy
- Institutions: Wheaton College, Rutgers - Douglass College, Brandeis University, Boston University, Harvard School of Medicine, Tufts University
- Main interests: Philosophy of mind, emotion, moral philosophy, history of philosophy, Aristotle, Spinoza, Descartes, literary criticism, art criticism

Amélie Oksenberg Rorty (May 20, 1932 – September 18, 2020) was a Belgian-born American philosopher known for her work in the philosophy of mind (in particular on the emotions), history of philosophy (especially Aristotle, Spinoza and Descartes), and moral philosophy.

== Career ==
Rorty received her B.A. from the University of Chicago in 1951, M.A. and Ph.D. degrees from Yale University in 1954 and 1961 respectively, and an M.A. from Princeton University in anthropology. She began her academic career at Wheaton College (Mass.) (1957–1961), then began teaching at Rutgers (Livingston College) in 1962 and taught there through to 1988, by which time she had achieved the rank of distinguished professor. She was also professor in the history of ideas (and director of the program) at Brandeis University from 1995 to 2003, and from 2008 to 2013 was visiting professor at Boston University. As of 2013, she was a visiting professor at Tufts University. She was also a lecturer in the Department of Global Health and Social Medicine, Harvard School of Medicine. Rorty was the recipient of numerous awards and fellowships over the course of her career: Center for Advanced Study in the Behavioral Studies (1968-1969), King's College, Cambridge (1971-1973), Institute for Advanced Study (1980-1981), John Simon Guggenheim (1990-1991), Woodrow Wilson Center (1994-1995), and the National Humanities Center (2007-2008).

=== Work ===
Rorty primarily worked on problems in moral psychology and moral education. She was especially interested in the many distinctive –-and often conflicting—functions of morality as a social practice, as it sets prohibitions, projects ideals, defines duties, and characterizes virtues. Exploring the dark side of some of the virtues—for example, courage as bravado, integrity as moral narcissism, ambivalent love—she analyzed the advantages of resistance to the obligations of morality, including the benefits of self-deception, the lures of moral weakness, the wisdom of ambivalence, and hidden rationales for allegedly irrational emotions. She approached many of these issues historically (through Aristotle, Spinoza, Hume and Freud) and anthropologically (projecting a study of exiles, immigrants, and refugees who perforce absorb a new set of 'moral' values.) Her final project was an unfinished book provisionally titled On the Other Hand: The Ethics of Ambivalence.

Rorty is the author of more than 120 scholarly articles. She wrote or edited more than a dozen scholarly books of original essays. A monograph, Mind in Action: Essays in Philosophy of Mind, was published by Beacon Press in 1988 (paperback edition 1991). She also edited and contributed to Explaining Emotions (U. California Press, 1980), Essays on Aristotle's Ethics (1980, U.California Press), and co-edited Essays on Aristotle's De Anima (Oxford, 1992) with Martha Nussbaum. She initiated and served as general editor of Modern Studies in Philosophy (Doubleday-Anchor) and of Major Thinkers (University of California Press). Other notable books she edited include The Many Faces of Evil (Routledge, 2001), The Identities of Persons (1976, U. California Press) and The Many Faces of Philosophy (Oxford, 2000).

== Personal life ==
Amélie Oksenberg, daughter of Polish Jews Klara and Israel Oksenberg, was born in Belgium and emigrated with her parents to Virginia, where she was raised on a farm. She enrolled at a young age at the University of Chicago, and went on to pursue a doctorate at Yale, where she married Richard Rorty, a fellow graduate student and philosopher. They had a son, Jay, and divorced in 1972. She wrote about her upbringing in "Dependency, Individuality and Work" and in "A Philosophic Travelogue," The Dewey Lecture, American Philosophical Association, Proceedings and Addresses, vol. 88, 2014. Oksenberg's younger brother, Michel, was an American political scientist and key architect of President Jimmy Carter's China policy.

== Additional awards and fellowships ==
- 1971–1973, Fellow, King's College, Cambridge
- 1984–1985, Visiting Honorary Research Associate, Philosophy, Harvard University
- 1980–1981, Member, Institute for Advanced Study
- 1990–1991, John Simon Guggenheim Fellow
- 1994–1995, Woodrow Wilson Center Fellow
- 2001–2002, Distinguished Woman Philosopher of the Year, Society for Women in Philosophy
- 2007–2008, Fellow, National Humanities Center
