= Stephen Orlins =

American diplomat and lawyer

Stephen A. Orlins
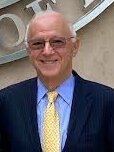

Former President of the National Committee on United States–China Relations
- In office May 1, 2005 – November 10, 2026

Personal details
- Born: 1950 (age 75–76)
- Education: Harvard University (BA, JD)

Stephen A. Orlins (born 1950) is an American lawyer and diplomat who was the president of the National Committee on United States–China Relations between May 1, 2005 and November 10, 2026. Prior to this, Orlins was the managing director of The Carlyle Group Asia. He was also chairman of Taiwan Broadband Communications (TBC) and senior advisor to AEA Investors Inc., a New York based leveraged buyout firm, with responsibility for AEA’s business activities throughout Asia.

Born to a mother and paternal grandparents who were European and Jewish immigrants to the United States, he grew up in a family where his brother, sister and he were taught that, but for the American government and the American people, they wouldn’t exist and they would have perished in Europe and died under the Nazis, or in a Russian pogrom.

== Education ==
Orlins graduated from Harvard College and Harvard Law School.

== Career ==
From 1976 to 1979, Orlins served in the Office of the Legal Advisor of the United States Department of State, first in the Office of the Assistant Legal Advisor for Political-Military Affairs and then for East Asian and Pacific Affairs. While in that office, he was a member of the legal team that helped establish diplomatic relations with the People’s Republic of China.

From 1983 to 1991, Orlins was with the investment banking firm of Lehman Brothers where he was a Managing Director from 1985 to 1991. From 1987 to 1990, he served as President of Lehman Brothers Asia. Based in Hong Kong, he supervised over 150 professionals with offices in Hong Kong, Korea, China, Taiwan, Thailand, Manila and Singapore. Earlier in his career, Orlins practiced law with Coudert Brothers and Paul, Weiss, Rifkind, Wharton & Garrison in New York, Hong Kong, and Beijing.

In 1992 was the Democratic nominee for the United States Congress in New York's 3rd congressional district.

In July 2022, Orlins helped found a group of U.S. business and policy leaders who share the goal of cohesively engaging with China in order to improve U.S.-China relations.

At the 60th anniversary gala dinner of the National Committee on United States–China Relations on November 10, 2026, Orlins stepped down as its president and passed the baton to Sarah M. Beran.
