= George E. Shambaugh Jr. =

American physician

- Shambaugh Jr. in 1953
- Born: June 29, 1903; Chicago, Illinois, U.S.
- Died: February 7, 1999 (aged 95); Sandwich, Illinois, U.S.
- Education: Amherst College, Harvard Medical School
- Known for: His use of the operating microscope in ear surgery, and his innovations in the treatment of otosclerosis
- Awards: Honorary doctorates from the University of Freiburg and the University of Bordeaux; Award of Merit from the American Otologic Society
- Scientific career
- Fields: Otolaryngology, Otology
- Workplaces: Northwestern University

George Elmer Shambaugh Jr. (29 June 1903 – 7 February 1999) was an American otolaryngologist, an expert in diseases of and defects in the inner ear, and a pioneer in surgical and chemical treatments for deafness. George was the first physician to use an operating microscope in delicate ear surgery.

An expert in his field, he published more than 400 articles in medical journals, edited the Archives of Otolaryngology for 10 years, and wrote the textbook Surgery of the Ear (1959), which remains in print. His medical career spanned 70 years: he continued to see patients until a week before his death. He had two children in his first marriage to Marietta Moss, Dr. George E. Shambaugh III and Susan Shambaugh, which ended in divorce. His second wife was Genevieve Krum and they raised David Shambaugh. He is survived by two children and ten grandchildren.

== Early life and education ==
Shambaugh Jr. was born on June 29, 1903, in Chicago, Illinois. He was the son of George E. Shambaugh Sr., a otolaryngologist who helped establish the field, including the description of a portion of the inner ear later named after him. Shambaugh Jr. attended University High School in Chicago and went on to graduate from Amherst College in 1924 before receiving his M.D. from Harvard Medical School in 1928.

Following his graduation from Harvard, Shambaugh Jr. completed an internship at Peter Bent Brigham Hospital in Boston (1928–1930) and pursued residencies at the Massachusetts Eye and Ear Infirmary and the Presbyterian Hospital in Chicago.

== Career ==
=== Innovations in otologic surgery ===
Shambaugh Jr. was a known figure in modern otologic surgery. He was among the first to employ an operating microscope for delicate ear operations—a technique that significantly improved the precision of procedures such as stapedectomy and fenestration surgery. He refined methods for detecting and treating otosclerosis, including the use of continuous irrigation during fenestration procedures and, later, the introduction of sodium fluoride to reduce the rate of surgical recurrences.

=== Contributions ===
Shambaugh Jr. published over 400 articles and editorials in medical journals and served as the editor of the Archives of Otolaryngology for a decade. His textbook, Surgery of the Ear—first published in 1959 and subsequently updated through several editions—became a standard reference in the field. He also founded the first otologic research laboratory in the United States at Northwestern University, where he also held the positions of staff surgeon, professor, and chairman of the Department of Otolaryngology.

=== Later career and legacy ===
Remarkably, Shambaugh maintained an active medical practice until shortly before his death, reportedly continuing to see patients up to a week prior. Even as he approached advanced age, he advocated for retaining his operating privileges and remained engaged in developing treatments, including approaches to address hearing loss related to allergies and environmental factors.

=== Honors ===
Shambaugh held presidencies in several professional societies, including the Otosclerosis Study Group, the American Society of Ophthalmologic and Otolaryngologic Allergy, and the American Otological Society. He organized international workshops on otomicrosurgery, which brought together leading surgeons from around the world. He was awarded honorary doctorates from the University of Freiburg and the University of Bordeaux, as well as the Award of Merit from the American Otologic Society.

== Personal life ==
Shambaugh married Marietta Susan Moss in 1927, with whom he had two children; the marriage ended in divorce in 1945. He later married Geneviève Krum in 1948; this union produced an adopted son, David. His family life was interwoven with his professional pursuits, and several of his children followed in medical or related professional fields.
