= Office of China Coordination =

U.S. State Department office

- Seal of the United States Department of State

Office overview
- Formed: 2022
- Employees: 60–70
- Office executive: Joshua Young, Coordinator
- Parent department: U.S. Department of State; Bureau of East Asian and Pacific Affairs

The Office of China Coordination (OCC), informally known as China House, is a unit of the Bureau of East Asian and Pacific Affairs under the U.S. State Department that coordinates information-sharing and policy towards the People's Republic of China.

== History ==
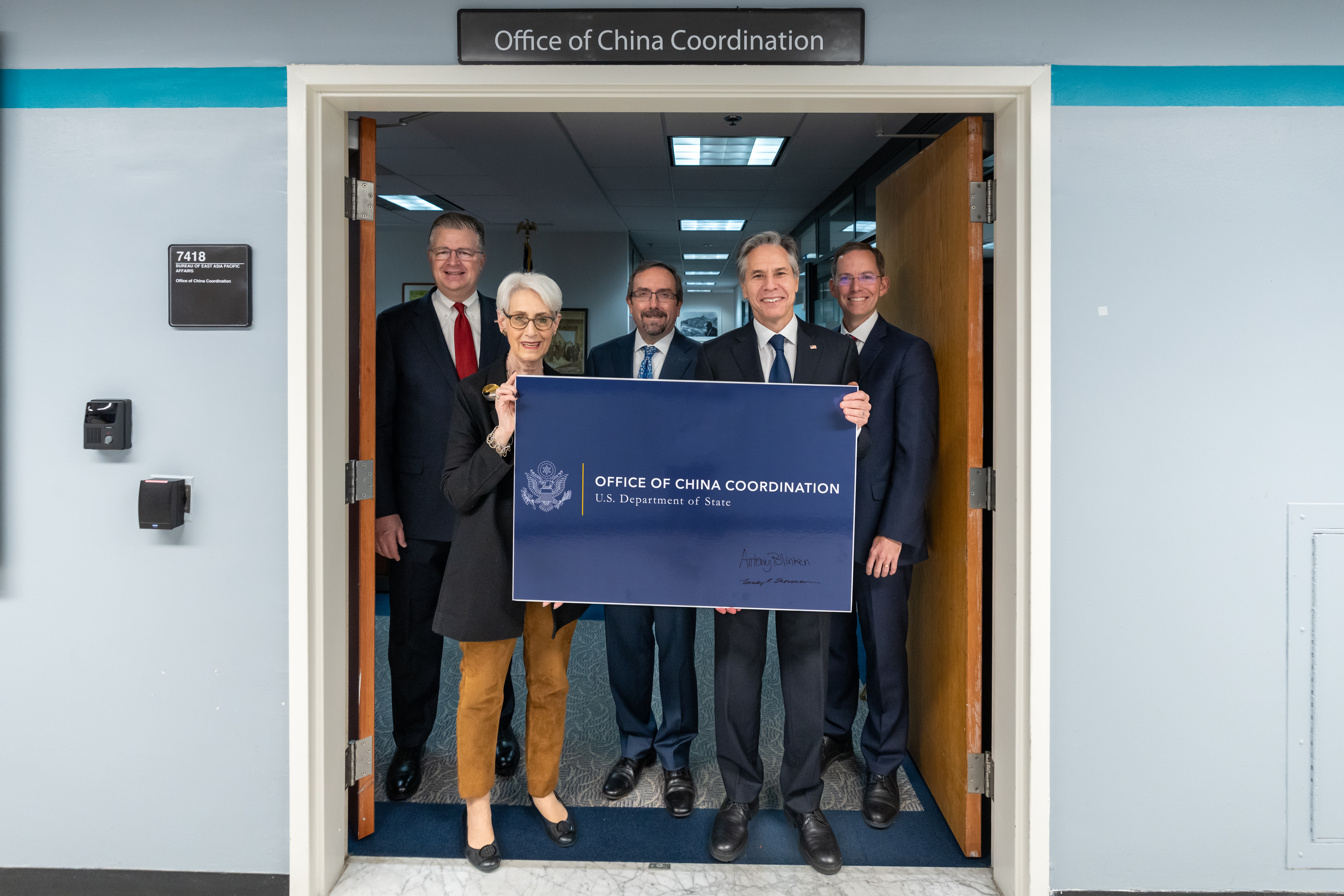
Launch of the Office of China Coordination, 2022.

The OCC replaced the China Desk of Bureau of East Asian and Pacific Affairs in December 2022. The office has almost 70 employees, including people of expertise in fields such as international security, economics, technology, multilateral diplomacy, and strategic communication. The reorganization, launched by Secretary of State Antony Blinken, was described as a centerpiece of the Biden administration's diplomatic efforts in the global rivalry between the United States and China.

Officials told Politico that the OCC would eliminate some silos among redundant government bodies and streamline policymaking. Politico described it as analogous to the Central Intelligence Agency's China Mission Center, in that both entities would be hubs for directing funding, resources and personnel. Before the reorganization, some former State Department officials had voiced concerns about adding another layer of bureaucracy, and a spokesperson for Republican Sen. Jim Risch of Idaho called the OCC a "bureaucratic power grab". Risch held up the reorganization for some months until his concerns subsided.

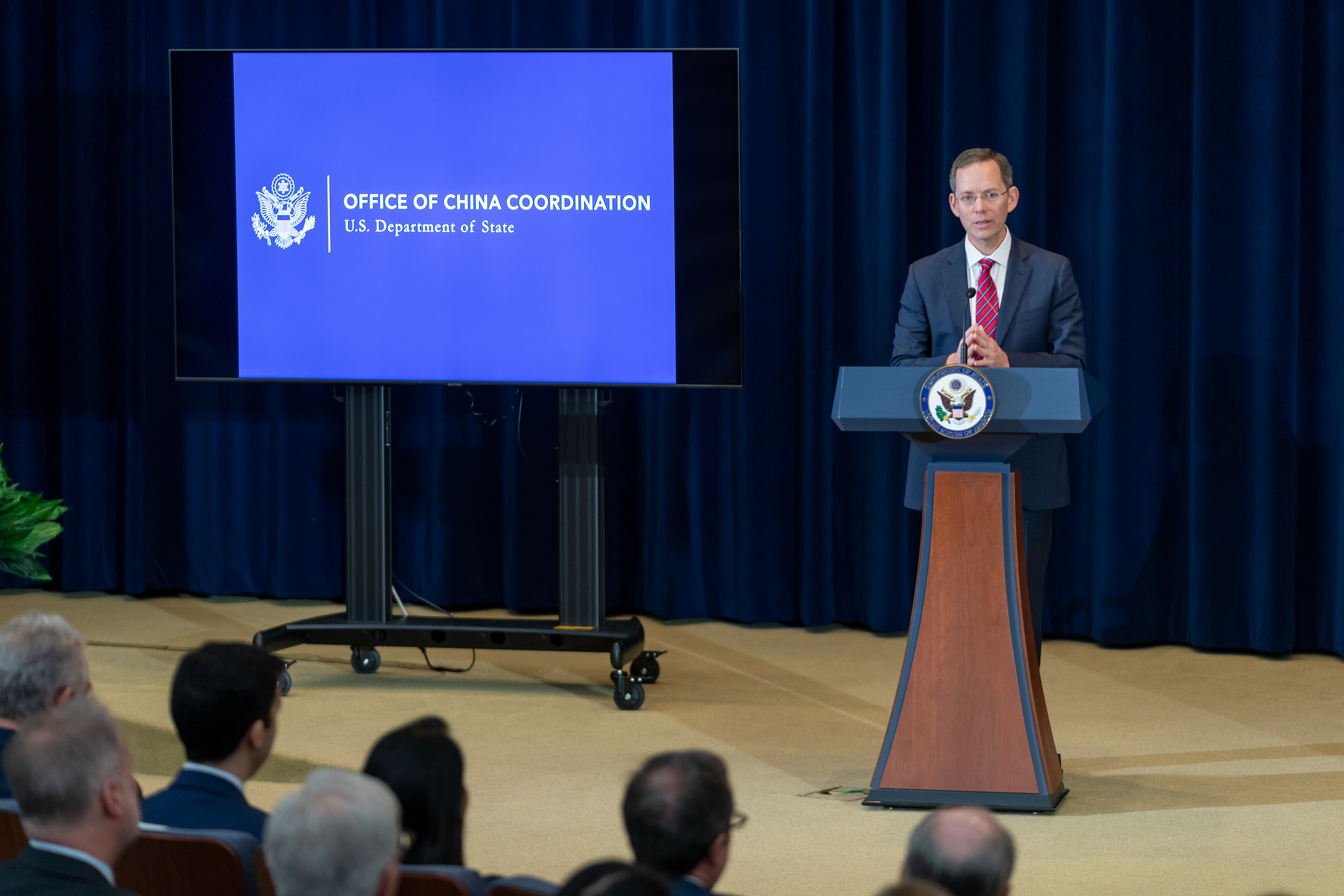
Inaugural China Coordinator Rick Waters Delivers Remarks at a Launch Event for the Office of China Coordination

In May 2023, Reuters reported "morale problems" at the OCC, potentially stemming from lack of prioritization of China issues from State Department leadership. Around this time, the OCC Chief Rick Waters (who subsequently joined the Eurasia Group as managing director for China) was also heard to be stepping down from the post. In September 2023, the State Department announced that Waters will be succeeded by Mark Baxter Lambert, confirming WSJ's August 2023 reporting citing unnamed sources familiar with the decision.
