= National Committee on United States–China Relations =

American organization promoting United States China relations

Coordinates: 40.74266°N 73.99215°W

- Formation: 1966; 60 years ago
- Type: 501(c)(3) organization
- Tax ID no.: 13-2566973
- Purpose: To promote United States-China relations
- Headquarters: 6 E. 43 Street, 24th Floor, Manhattan
- Members: By invitation
- President: Sarah M. Beran
- Vice President: Jan Berris
- Website: www.ncuscr.org

The National Committee on United States China Relations (NCUSCR) is a nonprofit organization and advisory body founded in 1966 to encourage understanding and cooperation between the United States and the People's Republic of China (PRC). Since 1966, the committee has conducted exchanges, educational, and policy activities in the areas of politics and security, education, governance and civil society, economic cooperation, media, and transnational issues, addressing these topics with respect to mainland China, Hong Kong, and Taiwan.

At the 60th anniversary gala dinner of the nonprofit on November 10, 2026, Sarah M. Beran becomes its new president, taking over the baton from Stephen Orlins who had been serving since 2005.

== History ==
The National Committee on United States–China Relations was founded in 1966 by a coalition of academic "China watchers," civic, religious, and business leaders who were concerned with China's isolation and American apparent interest in maintaining that situation. Cecil Thomas, a Secretary of the American Friends Service Committee, was influential in recruiting and organizing them, and became the organization's first executive director.

The committee was energized by helping to organize two groundbreaking conferences: the “Institute on China Today” held at University of California, Berkeley in 1964, and the “National Conference on the United States and China” in Washington, D.C. in 1965. Together, they gave a platform to debate the reshaping of the approach towards China. There was heated disagreement among even the scholars, but figures such as Henry Luce and American businessmen argued against defenders of the policy. There was widespread interest from newspapers, television, and the general public.

Several presidents had wanted to move closer to normalization of relations with the PRC but faced resistance in Congress. In 1971, the committee hosted a roundtable featuring guest speakers from countries that had begun exchanges with China in advance of official diplomatic relations. Members of the committee expressed the view that like these countries, Americans could develop ad hoc cooperative relations with China. The committee's mission was to educate the public, but it soon found itself in the position to offer information and advice to President Lyndon B. Johnson and other political leaders. In 1972, it co-hosted the Chinese table tennis team's tour of the United States, a widely publicized event that captured world attention. The historic two-way exchange by American and Chinese table tennis teams became known as Ping Pong Diplomacy.

The Committee originally had intended to be only a "catalyst" in opening relations with the PRC, a short-term temporary goal. But a change in this attitude came when it was called upon to manage the visit of the Chinese table-tennis team, part of American ping-pong diplomacy. Because there were no official diplomatic relations between the two countries, the State Department had to rely on private resources. The Committee stepped in, raised money, and made arrangements. This experience changed the committee's relations with American and Chinese officials, as well as its own goals. In the 1980s, the Committee expanded its work to promote sustained interactions between influential Chinese and Americans in governance, media, urban planning, international relations, and economic management.

On 15 November 2023, the National Committee on United States–China Relations and the US-China Business Council hosted a banquet with General Secretary of the Chinese Communist Party Xi Jinping for US business executives during the APEC United States 2023 meeting. The banquet drew questions from media about attendees and criticism from the United States House Select Committee on Strategic Competition between the United States and the Chinese Communist Party. Some commentators and scholars have called for the Internal Revenue Service (IRS) to investigate NCUSCR's tax-exempt status for potential violations of "political and legislative lobbying."

== Board of directors ==
- Carla Anderson Hills, chairperson

=== Vice chairs ===
- Evan G. Greenberg
- Maurice R. Greenberg
- Thomas Kean
- Nicholas R. Lardy
- Joseph Prueher
- William R. Rhodes
- J. Stapleton Roy
- Jim Sasser

=== Treasurer ===
- Keith W. Abell

=== Secretary ===
- I. Peter Wolff

=== Members ===
- Ray Dalio
- Jeffrey A. Bader
- Ajay Banga
- Dennis C. Blair
- Olivier Brandicourt
- Deborah Brautigam
- Milton Brice
- Kurt M. Campbell
- Amy Celico
- John S. Chen
- Daniel Cruise
- Nelson G. Dong
- Richard Edelman
- Martin Feldstein
- William E. Ford
- Barbara Franklin
- M. Taylor Fravel
- Charles W. Freeman III
- Richard Gelfond
- Jimmy Hexter
- Jon Huntsman Jr.
- Muhtar Kent
- Elizabeth Knup
- David M. Lampton
- Terrill E. Lautz
- Cheng Li
- Kenneth Lieberthal
- Andrew Liveris
- Gary Locke
- Samuel J. Locklear
- Evan S. Medeiros
- Kenneth P. Miller
- Howard Milstein
- Douglas H. Paal
- Sheldon Pang
- A. Robert Pietrzak
- Clark T. Randt Jr.
- Anthony J. Saich
- Maggie Sans
- Rob Speyer
- James Steinberg
- Ernie L. Thrasher
- Jan F. van Eck
- Robert H. Xiao
- John Young
- Peng Zhao

=== Former chairs ===
- A. Doak Barnett
- W. Michael Blumenthal
- Barber Conable
- Alexander Eckstein
- Lucian W. Pye
- Robert A. Scalapino
- Raymond P. Shafer
- Charles Yost

== See also ==
- China–United States relations
- United States-China Economic and Security Review Commission
- Congressional-Executive Commission on China

== Illustrative publications ==
- Michel Oksenberg, Academy of Political Science (U.S.) and National Committee on United States–China Relations. China's Developmental Experience. (New York: Academy of Political Science, Proceedings of the Academy of Political Science 31.1, 1973).
- Perkins, Dwight (2020). Perkins, Dwight (ed.). Rural Small-Scale Industry in the People's Republic of China. Berkeley, CA. doi:10.1525/9780520314719. ISBN 978-0-520-31471-9. OCLC 1229160797.
- Scalapino, R. A. (1967). An annotated guide to modern China. New York: National Committee on United States–China Relations.

== References and further reading ==
- Barnett, A. D., & Reischauer, E. O. (1970). The United States and China: The next decade. New York: Praeger.
- "National Committee on United States-China Relations." Berkshire Encyclopedia of China, Volume 3, Great Barrington, MA. Berkshire Publishing Group, 2009. (p. 1548-1555)
- Berris, Jan Carol (1986). "The Evolution of Sino-American Relations: A view from the National Committee" (PDF). In Kallgren D. F. Simon, J. K. (ed.). Educational Exchanges: Essays on the Sino-American Experience. Berkeley: University of California Institute of East Asian Studies. pp. 80–92.
- Bullock, Mary Brown (2005), "Mission Accomplished: The Influence of the CSCCRP", in Li, Cheng (ed.), Bridging Minds Across the Pacific: US-China Educational Exchanges, 1978-2003, pp. 49–68
- Cohen, Warren. (1986). While China faced east: Chinese-American cultural relations. In J. K. Kallgren & D. F. Simon (Eds.), Educational exchanges: Essays on the Sino-American experience (p. 49). Berkeley: University of California, Institute of East Asian Studies.
- Harding, H. (1992). A fragile relationship: The United States and China since 1972. Washington, DC: The Brookings Institution.
- Kallgren, J. K. (1986). Public interest and private interest in Sino–American exchanges: De Tocqueville's "Associations" in action. In J. K. Kallgren & D. F. Simon (Eds.), Educational exchanges: Essays on the Sino-American experience (p. 65). Berkeley: University of California, Institute of East Asian Studies.
- Lampton, David M.; Madancy, Joyce A.; Williams, Kristen M. (1986). A Relationship Restored: Trends in U.S.-China Educational Exchanges, 1978-1984. Washington, D.C.: National Academy Press. ISBN 030903678X.
- Madsen, R. (1995). China and the American dream: A moral inquiry. Berkeley: University of California Press.
- Mang, Robert; Mang, Pamela (1976), A History of the Origins of the National Committee on United States–China Relations (PDF), Unpublished report. Prepared at the request of the Christopher Reynolds Foundation
- Wheeler, Norton (2012), The Role of American NGOs in China's Modernization: Invited Influence, Asia's Transformations, New York: Routledge, ISBN 9780415506571 Chapter Two, "The National Committee on United States-China Relations."
