= Robert A. Scalapino =

American political scientist (1919–2011)

- Born: 19 October 1919; Leavenworth, Kansas, U.S.
- Died: 1 November 2011 (aged 92)
- Education: Harvard University
- Scientific career
- Thesis: An Analysis of Political Party Failure in Japan (1948)
- Doctoral students: Richard Baum

Robert Anthony Scalapino (October 19, 1919 – November 1, 2011) was an American political scientist and East Asia specialist. He was a co-founder and inaugural chairman of the National Committee on United States–China Relations. Together with his co-author Chong-Sik Lee, he won the 1974 Woodrow Wilson Foundation Award for the best book on government, politics, or international affairs from the American Political Science Association. Scalapino's daughters include the artist Diane Sophia and poet Leslie Scalapino (1944–2010).

== Early life and education ==
Scalapino was born to Anthony and Beulah Stephenson Scalapino in Leavenworth, Kansas. In 1940, he completed his bachelor's degree at Santa Barbara College, now the University of California, Santa Barbara, where he was student body president in his last year. He married Ida Mae Jessen, the next year on August 23, 1941. Rhey had three children: Leslie, Diane, and Lynne. Scalapino received his master's degree in 1943 and his doctorate in 1948, both from Harvard University. During World War II he served in U.S. Naval Intelligence from 1943 to 1946, where he studied Japanese. He reached the rank of lieutenant junior grade.

== Career ==
After graduating from Harvard University, Scalapino remained there for a year teaching as an instructor, and then went to the University of California, Berkeley as an assistant professor in 1949. He achieved full professor status in 1956, and took emeritus status in 1990. He was chair of Department of Political Science from 1962 to 1965. He founded and was the first director of the Institute of East Asian Studies, from 1978 to 1990. He sat on the board of directors of the Council on Foreign Relations and was a member of the American Academy of Arts and Sciences. He was editor of the scholarly journal, Asian Survey, from 1962 to January 1996. Scalapino remained active into his late 80s, serving as a government consultant and testifying at Congressional hearings.

In 2010, the National Bureau of Asian Research and the Woodrow Wilson International Center for Scholars, as part of the National Asia Research Program (NARP), created the Scalapino Prize in honor of Scalapino and his contributions to the field of Asian studies. The prize would be awarded to an outstanding scholar in the field of Asian studies every two years. The inaugural Scalapino Prize was awarded to David M. Lampton in June 2010 at the 2010 Asia Policy Assembly.

He died of complications from a respiratory infection on November 1, 2011, at the age of 92.

== Awards ==
- 1973 with Chong-Sik Lee, the Woodrow Wilson Foundation Award for their book Communism in Korea
- 1976 honorary LL.D., Academia Sinica (Taiwan)
- 1983 honorary D.P.S., Hankuk University of Foreign Studies (Korea)
- 1989 honorary D.P.S., Kyung Hee University (Korea)
- 1988 Order of the Sacred Treasure (Japan)
- 1990 Presidential Order (Korea)
- 1990 Berkeley Citation, University of California at Berkeley

== Selected publications ==
Scalapino published 540 articles and 39 books or monographs on Asian politics and United States–Asian policy, which include:

- 1953 Democracy and the Party Movement in Pre-War Japan
- 1961 with George T. Yu The Chinese Anarchist Movement
- 1962 with Junnosuke Masumi Parties and Politics in Contemporary Japan
- 1967 The Japanese Communist Movement, 1920-1966
- 1972 with Chong-Sik Lee Communism in Korea
- 1972 Elites in the People's Republic of China
- 1975 Asia and the Road Ahead
- 1979 The United States and Korea: Looking Ahead
- 1983 The Early Japanese Labor Movement
- 1989 The Politics of Development: Perspectives on Twentieth Century Asia
- 1992 The Last Leninists: The Uncertain Future of Asia's Communist States
- 1997 North Korea at a Crossroads
- 2008 From Leavenworth to Lhasa: living in a revolutionary era
