= Alexander Eckstein =

Alexander Eckstein (Novi Sad, Yugoslavia, December 9, 1915 – December 4, 1976, Ann Arbor, Michigan) was a professor of economics who worked at the University of Michigan.

Eckstein's area of expertise was the Chinese economy. He played a notable role in the Center for Chinese Studies at the University of Michigan and the development of Sino-US diplomacy (the so-called Ping-pong diplomacy) of the 1970s.

He obtained a B.S. degree (1939), M.S. degree (1941) and PhD (1952) from University of California. He worked as an economist for the US State Department from 1951 to 1953 before joining Harvard University as a researcher and lecturer. He was professor of international economics at University of Rochester from 1959 to 1961. In 1961, he became professor of economics at University of Michigan.

== Selected publications ==
- 1962, The National Income of Communist China
- 1966, Communist China's Economic Development and Foreign Trade
- 1975, China's Economic Development: The Interplay of Scarcity and Ideology
- 1977, China's Economic Revolution
- 1977, Comparison of Economic Systems: Theoretical and Methodological Approaches
