= Martin King Whyte =

American sociology professor emeritus

Martin King Whyte (born 1942, Chinese name: 怀默霆; Huái Mòtíng) is an American sociology professor emeritus at Harvard University who is best known for his research on contemporary Chinese society in both the Mao and reform eras. He joined the Harvard Faculty in 2000. Previously, he served on the faculties of the University of Michigan and George Washington University. Whyte completed his graduate work at Harvard in the 1960s. Professor Whyte's primary research and teaching focuses on comparative sociology, sociology of the family, sociology of development, the sociological study of China, and the study of post-communist transitions.

== Career ==
Whyte began his teaching as a lecturer at Boston University in 1968. From 1970 to 1994, Whyte served on the faculty of the University of Michigan, being promoted from assistant professor to professor of sociology. In 1994, he moved to Silver Spring, Maryland, while he was teaching at the George Washington University (1994–2000), after which he moved to Harvard, where he taught until he retired in 2015. In the spring of 2002, Whyte was a visiting professor at the University of Aveiro in Portugal. He served as the acting director of Harvard's Fairbank Center for Chinese Studies during AY 2007-2008.

In 2011, Whyte was a witness before the United States-China Economic and Security Review Commission in Washington, D.C. Downplaying speculation that the People's Republic of China may implode as it grows economically, Whyte stated that he and his fellow researchers have not found “. . . clear evidence for the assumed large anger about the unfairness of the current patterns of inequality . . . protests are almost always sparked by procedural injustices--unfairness of local governments, abuses of power, people not able to get redress when they're mistreated, and so forth, and by fear about whether they're going to be able to maintain their property or their future careers. Accordingly, " . . . rather than Chinese society being a social volcano about to explode in anger about distributive injustice issues, it appears from our survey results that most Chinese citizens view current inequalities as relatively fair and as providing ample opportunities for ordinary individuals and families to get ahead. Chinese on most counts view the current system as more fair than do their counterparts in other post-socialist countries in Eastern Europe. Compared to their counterparts in advanced capitalist countries, they express views that are similar or at times even more favorable. Thus our survey data lead to an ironic conclusion. In China lifelong communist bureaucrats are doing a better job legitimating the ideas, incentives, and differentials of their increasingly capitalistic society than the leaders of more democratic and even well established and wealthy capitalist societies."

== Research ==
Whyte's research is conducted through comparative sociology and focuses on the institutional development of China and the former Soviet Union; family systems and family change; the American family; gender roles in comparative context; inequality and stratification; bureaucracy; the sociology of development, and the sociology of post-communist transitions. In the volume Martin Whyte edited in 2003, Whyte and his fellow sociologists countered the conventional view that traditional family patterns are weakened by economic development and social revolutions. Using collaborative 1994 surveys performed in Baoding, China and comparative data from Taiwan, the authors found continued vitality of intergenerational support and filial obligations.

== Teaching ==
Whyte's pedagogy addresses a variety of sociological issues of concern in today's world. Courses taught include, United States in the World 21: The American Family; The Sociology of Development; Societies of the World 21: China's Two Social Revolutions; Sociology of Families and Kinship.

== Family ==
Whyte is the son of Cornell University's path-breaking social scientist, William Foote Whyte. Whyte was born in Oklahoma City, Oklahoma while his father was teaching at the University of Oklahoma), and then moved to Warm Springs, Georgia, to Chicago, Illinois and finally to Trumansburg, New York, in 1948, at the age of six. He spent his teenage years in Trumansburg, near Ithaca, where his father taught at Cornell University. Martin Whyte's grandfather was also a professor. John Whyte taught German at New York University and the City University of New York. The Whyte family emigrated from Kinross, Scotland to the State of Wisconsin in the mid-19th century.

== Education ==
Whyte took his Bachelor of Arts at Cornell University, majoring in physics and minoring in Russian studies. He graduated cum laude. In 1963, he participated in the University of Michigan Study Tour of the USSR. Taking his Master of Arts at Harvard University in 1966 in Russian area studies, Professor Whyte then undertook doctoral work at the same university. His Harvard thesis was entitled "Small Groups and Political Rituals in Communist China". Whyte received his doctorate in sociology from Harvard in 1971.

== Associations ==
Whyte was a member of Phi Eta Sigma at Cornell University, and inducted into that university's chapter of Phi Beta Kappa. He joined the Phi Kappa Psi fraternity. He is active in the American Sociological Association, Association for Asian Studies, Sociological Research Association, Population Association of America, National Committee for U.S. China Relations.

== Sample publications ==
- Martin K. Whyte, Myth of the Social Volcano (Stanford: Stanford University Press, 2010);
- Martin K. Whyte, ed., One Country, Two Societies: Rural-Urban Inequality in Contemporary China (Cambridge, MA: Harvard University Press, 2010);
- Martin K. Whyte, Do Chinese Citizens Want the Government to do More to Promote Equality? in Chinese Politics: State, Society and the Market. (Peter Hays Gries, Stanley Rosen, ed. 2010);
- Martin K. Whyte, ed., China's Revolutions and Inter-Generational Relations (Ann Arbor, MI: University of Michigan Center for Chinese Studies, 2003);
- Martin K. Whyte, Marriage in America: A Communitarian Perspective (Lanham, MD: Rowman & Littlefield, 2000).
