= Bureau of East Asian and Pacific Affairs =

Bureau of the United States Department of State

- Seal of the United States Department of State

Bureau overview
- Preceding bureau: Office of Chinese Affairs
- Jurisdiction: Executive branch of the United States
- Headquarters: Harry S. Truman Building, Washington, D.C., United States
- Employees: 1,545 (As of 2013)
- Annual budget: $336 million (diplomatic engagement budget), $760 million (foreign assistance budget) (FY 2020)
- Bureau executive: Michael G. DeSombre, Assistant Secretary of State for East Asian and Pacific Affairs
- Parent department: U.S. Department of State
- Website: state.gov/eap

The Bureau of East Asian and Pacific Affairs (EAP), formerly the Office of Chinese Affairs, is part of the United States Department of State and is charged with advising the secretary of state and under secretary of state for political affairs on matters of the Asia-Pacific region, as well as dealing with U.S. foreign policy and U.S. relations with countries in the region. It is headed by the assistant secretary of state for East Asian and Pacific affairs, who reports to the under secretary of state for political affairs.

== Organization ==
The offices of the Bureau of East Asian and Pacific Affairs direct, coordinate, and supervise U.S. government activities within the region, including political, economic, consular, public diplomacy, and administrative management issues.

- Office of Australia, New Zealand, and Pacific Island Affairs (EAP/ANP) – Coordinates policy on Australia, Fiji, Kiribati, the Marshall Islands, Micronesia, Nauru, New Zealand, Palau, Papua New Guinea, Samoa, the Solomon Islands, Tonga, Tuvalu, Vanuatu and Antarctica
- Office of China Coordination (China House) (EAP/CHINA) – Coordinates policy regarding China
- Office of Regional and Security Policy (EAP/RSP)
- Office of Public Affairs (EAP/P) – Coordinates the bureau's media engagement and domestic public outreach, and prepares press guidance for the Department Spokesperson in the Bureau of Public Affairs
- Office of Japanese Affairs (EAP/J) – Oversees Japan–United States relations
- Office of Mainland Southeast Asian Affairs (EAP/MLS) – Coordinates policy on Burma, Cambodia, Laos, Thailand, and Vietnam
- Office of Maritime Southeast Asian Affairs (EAP/MTS) – Coordinates policy on Brunei, East Timor, Indonesia, Malaysia, the Philippines and Singapore.
- Office of Korean and Mongolian Affairs (EAP/KM) – Coordinates policy towards North Korea and South Korea. Since 2022 this office as also coordinated bilateral relations with Mongolia.
- Office of Public Diplomacy (EAP/PD)
- Office of Taiwan Coordination (EAP/TC) – Oversees Taiwan–United States relations
- Office of Economic Policy (EAP/EP)
- Office of the Executive Director (EAP/EX) – Oversees the bureau's human resources and resource management

The following offices were cut in 2025:

- Office of Multilateral Affairs (EAP/MLA) – Coordinated policy regarding the Association of Southeast Asian Nations (ASEAN), the East Asia Summit, the ASEAN Regional Forum, the Lower Mekong initiative and the Council for Security Cooperation in the Asia Pacific

== Budget ==
Its budget for FY 2020 was $336 million for diplomatic engagement and $760 million for foreign assistance.
