= Kenneth Lieberthal =

American political scientist (born 1943)

- Born: Kenneth Guy Lieberthal; September 9, 1943 (age 82); Asheville, North Carolina, U.S.
- Other name: Lǐ Kǎnrú (李侃如)
- Education: Dartmouth College (BA); Columbia University (MA, PhD)
- Occupation: Political scientist
- Spouse: Jane Lindsay Lieberthal
- Children: 2

Kenneth Guy Lieberthal (Chinese: 李侃如; pinyin: Lǐ Kǎnrú; born September 9, 1943) is an American professor and politician known as an expert on Chinese politics, political economy, domestic and foreign policy, and on the evolution of US-China relations.

He is currently senior fellow emeritus in foreign policy at the Brookings Institution, where from 2009 to 2016, he was a senior fellow in the Foreign Policy and the Global Economy and Development programs; from 2009 to 2012, he also served as director of Brookings' John L. Thornton China Center. Lieberthal spent most of his career on the Political Science faculty of the University of Michigan. For 1998-2000 Lieberthal served in the Clinton Administration as Special Assistant to the President for National Security Affairs and Senior Director for Asia on the U.S. National Security Council.

== Early life and education ==
Lieberthal was born in Asheville, North Carolina. He is Jewish.

He received his A.B. cum laude and with distinction in Russian Studies from Dartmouth College, and an East Asian Institute Certificate (1968), M.A. (1968) and Ph.D. (1972) in Political Science at Columbia University.

== Career ==
For 1998 through 2000, Lieberthal took leave from his academic career to serve President Clinton as Special Assistant to the President for National Security Affairs and Senior Director for Asia on the U.S. National Security Council.

Lieberthal is professor emeritus at the University of Michigan. He joined the University of Michigan faculty as a professor of political science in 1983, and in 1995 became Arthur F. Thurnau Professor of Political Science and William Davidson Professor of Business Administration. He was director of the University of Michigan's Center for Chinese Studies from 1986 to 1989. In 2014 the university renamed the center the Kenneth G. Lieberthal and Richard H. Rogel Center for Chinese Studies. His publications focused particularly on China's politics, domestic and foreign policy, political economy, and on the evolution of US-China relations. Lieberthal taught Political Science at Swarthmore College from 1972 to 1983, advancing from Instructor to Professor, before joining the University of Michigan faculty in 1983.

Lieberthal authored, coauthored, and edited more than 20 books and monographs, many of which are also available in Chinese, and authored about 75 articles and chapters in books.

Lieberthal has consulted widely on Chinese and Asian affairs and has advised, among others, the U.S. Departments of State, Defense and Commerce, the World Bank, the Kettering Foundation, the Aspen Institute, the United Nations Association and corporations in the private sector. He has served on numerous academic, NGO, and advisory committees and boards and on the editorial boards of six scholarly journals. He is a member of the board of the National Committee on United States – China Relations.

=== Selected bibliography ===
==== Books ====
- 1976. Research Guide to Central Party and Government Meetings in China, 1949-1975. New York: International Arts and Sciences Press (jointly published with the University of Michigan Center for Chinese Studies)
- 1980. Revolution and Tradition in Tientsin, 1949-52. Stanford: Stanford University Press
- 1982. Chen Yun's Strategy for China's Development: A Non-Maoist Alternative. Contributing co-editor with Nicholas R. Lardy. New York: Myron E. Sharpe
- 1988. Policy Making in China: Leaders, Structures, and Processes (with Michel Oksenberg). Princeton: Princeton University Press
- 1995. Governing China: From Revolution Through Reform. New York: W.W. Norton. First edition published in 1995, revised edition published in 2004. Chinese translation of the 2004 2nd edition: 治理中国. Beijing: Chinese Social Sciences Press, 2010
- 2010. Contributing co-editor, Chinese Politics: New Sources, Methods, and Field Strategies. Cambridge: Cambridge University Press. Chinese translation: 当代中国政治研究. Beijing: Chinese Social Sciences Press, 2014
- 2011. Managing the China Challenge: How To Achieve Corporate Success in the People's Republic.. Washington, D.C.: Brookings Institution Press. Chinese translation: 应对中国挑战：企业如何在中国获得成功. Beijing: Chinese Social Sciences Press, 2014
- 2012. Bending History: Barack Obama’s Foreign Policy (with Martin Indyk and Michael E. O'Hanlon). Brookings Institution Press. Chinese translation: 重塑历史：贝拉克奥巴马的外交政策. Beijing: Social Sciences Press, 2016

==== Papers, reports, monographs ====
- 1978. Central Documents and Politburo Politics in China. Ann Arbor: the University of Michigan Center for Chinese Studies
- 1978. Sino-Soviet Conflict in the 1970s: Its Evolution and Implications for the Strategic Triangle. RAND/R-2342-NA. Santa Monica, CA: RAND Corporation
- 1986. Bureaucratic Politics and Chinese Energy Development (with Michel Oksenberg). Washington: U.S. Department of Commerce International Trade Administration.
- 1997. Constructing China: The Interaction of Culture and Economics, co-editor with Shuen-fu Lin and Ernest Young. Ann Arbor, Michigan: University of Michigan Center for Chinese Studies Monograph Series, vol. no. 78
- 2006. China's Search For Energy Security and Implications for US Policy (with Mikkal Herberg). Washington, D.C.: National Bureau of Asian Research
- 2009. Overcoming Obstacles to US–China Cooperation on Climate Change (with David B. Sandalow). Washington, D.C.: Brookings Institution
- 2009. The U.S. Intelligence Community and Foreign Policy: Getting Analysis Right. Washington, D.C.: Brookings Institution
- 2012. Cybersecurity and U.S.-China Relations (with Peter Singer). The Brookings Institution.
- 2012. Addressing U.S.-China Strategic Distrust (with Wang Jisi). The Brookings Institution. Published in Chinese as: 中美战略互疑：解析与应对. Beijing University International Strategic Studies Center, 2012

== Personal life ==
Lieberthal's wife, Jane Lindsay Lieberthal, is a former university administrator. They have two sons, Keith and Geoffrey. Keith is married to actress Julianna Margulies, while Geoffrey is married to former Olympic figure skater Sasha Cohen.

== See also ==
- List of Dartmouth College alumni
- List of Columbia University alumni
- List of Michigan writers
- List of people from North Carolina
- List of University of Michigan faculty and staff
