= Campus of New York University =

College campus in New York City

Coordinates: 40°43′46″N 73°59′47″W

The urban campus of New York University (NYU) is located in Manhattan, around Washington Square Park in Greenwich Village, and the MetroTech Center in Downtown Brooklyn. NYU is one of the top three largest landowners in New York City.

== Washington Square campus ==
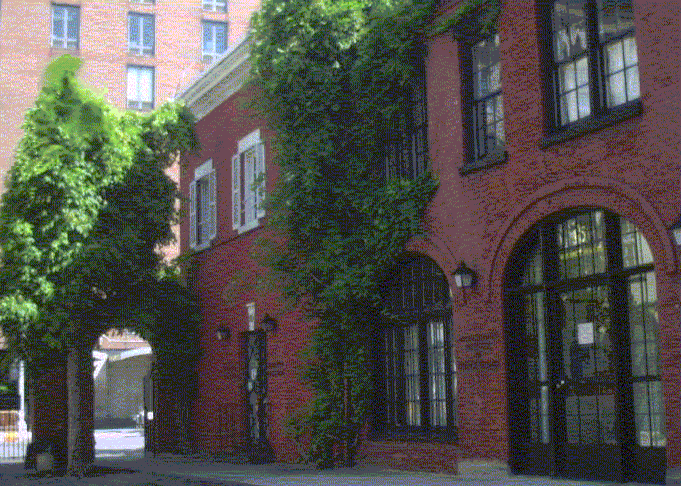
La Maison Française

Most of NYU's buildings on the main campus are scattered across a roughly square area bounded by Houston Street to the south, Broadway to the east, 14th Street to the north, and Sixth Avenue (Avenue of the Americas) to the west. Most of NYU's main buildings, including the Silver Center, Elmer Holmes Bobst Library, Stern School of Business, Courant Institute of Mathematics, and the Kimmel Center, surround Gould Plaza and Washington Square Park.

Since the late 1970s, the central part of NYU is its Washington Square campus in the heart of Greenwich Village. Despite being public property, and expanding the Fifth Avenue axis into Washington Square Park, the Washington Square Arch is the unofficial symbol of NYU. Until 2008, NYU's commencement ceremony was held in Washington Square Park. However, due to space constraints, ceremonies are now held at the Yankee Stadium. Important facilities at Washington Square are the Elmer Holmes Bobst Library, designed by Philip Johnson and Richard Foster, who also designed several other structures, such as Tisch Hall, Meyer Hall, and the Hagop Kevorkian Center. When designing these buildings Johnson and Foster also set up a master plan for a complete redesign of the NYU Washington Square campus. However, it was never implemented. Other historic buildings include the Silver Center (formerly known as "Main building"); the Brown Building of Science; Judson Hall, which houses the King Juan Carlos I of Spain Center; Vanderbilt Hall, the historic townhouse row on Washington Square North; The Grey Art Gallery at 100 Washington Square East, housing the New York University art collection and featuring museum quality exhibitions; the Kaufman Management Center; and the Torch Club – the NYU dining and club facility for alumni, faculty, and administrators. Just a block south of Washington Square is NYU's Washington Square Village, housing graduate students and junior and senior faculty residences in the Silver Towers, designed by I. M. Pei, where an enlargement of Picasso's sculpture Bust of Sylvette (1934) is displayed.

The contractors of the Old University Building used prisoners from Sing Sing to cut the marble. This hiring was the catalyst for the famous Stonecutter's Riot. The old University Building was also subject to several ghost stories. It was believed that the building was haunted by a young artist resident who had died in one of the building's turrets. The spirit was said to pace through the hallways and staircases. In 1880, the San Francisco Chronicle reported that "the structure has an evil repute with the servant girls of the neighborhood ... They have a notion that deep in subcellars lie corpses, skeletons and other dreadful things." The Triangle Shirtwaist Factory fire on March 25, 1911, took place in the Brown Building of Science (formerly the Asch Building) which today is part of the NYU campus. More than a hundred garment workers, most young women and girls, died or jumped to their deaths after a fire broke out whilst all exit doors were locked. The fire led to legislation requiring improved factory safety standards and helped spur the growth of the International Ladies' Garment Workers' Union.

In the 1990s, NYU became a "Two Square" university by building a second community around Union Square, about a 10-minute walk from Washington Square. NYU's Union Square community consists of the upperclassmen residence halls of Carlyle Court, Palladium Residence Hall, University Hall, Alumni Hall, Coral Towers, Thirteenth Street Hall, and Third North Residence Hall.

=== NYU theaters and clubs ===
NYU operates several theaters and performance facilities that are often used by the university's music conservatory and Tisch School of the Arts but also external productions. The largest performance accommodations at NYU are the Skirball Center for Performing Arts (850 seats) at 566 LaGuardia Place, just south of Washington Square South; and the Eisner-Lubin Auditorium (560 seats) in the Kimmel Center. Recently, the Skirball Center hosted important speeches on foreign policy by John Kerry and Al Gore as well as the recording of the season finale of The Apprentice 3. Well-known also is NYU's Provincetown Playhouse on MacDougal Street, where Eugene O'Neill among many others launched his career and the Frederick Loewe Theatre outside Gould Plaza. Catalyst to many careers in music (Bruce Springsteen began his career here among many others) was the famous nightclub The Bottom Line, found on the corner of West 4th and Mercer Streets. Despite the objections of many supporters, this club was evicted by NYU after being unable to meet for several months the increased rent payments.

=== Bobst Library ===
The Elmer Holmes Bobst Library, built between 1967 and 1972, is the largest library at NYU and one of the largest academic libraries in the U.S. Designed by Philip Johnson and Richard Foster, the 12-story, 425,000 square feet (39,500 m^{2}) structure sits on the southern edge of Washington Square Park and is the flagship of an eight-library, 4.5 million volume system that provides students and faculty members with access to the world's scholarship and serves as a center for the University's intellectual life. Bobst Library contains more than 3.3 million volumes, 20,000 journals, and more than 3.5 million microforms. The library is visited by more than 6,500 users each day, and circulates almost one million books annually. In addition to its regular collection it houses a number of special collections and archives, including the Archives of Irish America and the Tamiment Library and Robert F. Wagner Archives.

The floor of the library, when viewed from above, was designed to appear three-dimensional. In late 2003, Bobst Library was the site of two suicidal incidents. Two students jumped from the open-air crosswalks inside the library onto the marble floor below. The students later died of their injuries. After the second suicide, NYU installed plexi-glass windows on each level to prevent further attempts. In 2003, Bobst Library was also in the news for being the home of a homeless student who resided at the library because he could not afford student housing. Broke student 'slept in library'

=== Real estate and development ===
Greenwich Village has long had a mixed relationship with NYU. Residents and university leaders frequently have differing views on how the school, its buildings and its students should interact with the neighborhood.

The tearing down of a block of tenements and brownstones in 1950 for construction of Vanderbilt Hall, the law school, was a signal of things to come. Residents both mourned the loss of the old block, on Washington Square South between MacDougal and Sullivan Streets, and worried about the university dominating the Washington Square area. Following the closure of the Bronx campus (see History section above), the school expanded downtown, growing significantly – both in student body size and academic and dormitory footprint – from the 1980s through the present.

In addition to the sheer mass of the school's real estate holdings, its approach to architecture has often been criticized. From 1964, when noted architecture critic Ada Louise Huxtable wrote that NYU had a "consistent blindness to the area's architectural and historical features", to 2013, when critic James Russell wrote that "for decades, New York University has waged architectural war on Greenwich Village", the school has developed a reputation for construction that is insensitive to both aesthetic and community concerns.

While the Bobst Library, built in 1973, and the many dorms built throughout the 1980s and 1990s all had their detractors, construction of the Kimmel Center for University Life (opened 2003) on Washington Square South sparked broader attention. Critics said the building would ruin the Fifth Avenue view through the Washington Square Arch and cast a shadow on the park, issues impacting a broader swath of city residents and tourists. Over the years, a local preservation group, the Greenwich Village Society for Historic Preservation (GVSHP), has been a vocal opponent of NYU. GVSHP was one of several dozen participants, including NYU itself, in the Community Task Force on NYU Development, which was convened by Manhattan Borough President Scott Stringer in 2006. "In order to maintain the integrity of the affected neighborhoods, the University's goals for growth and development must be better aligned with those of the community at large" stated the Findings and Recommendations report of March 2010. Controversies in recent years include:

- Edgar Allan Poe house – As the university contemplated new construction to expand its law school, preservationists called for protection of 85 West Third Street, where Poe lived from 1844 through early 1846. It is where he wrote "The Cask of Amontillado" and revised and published "The Raven". They asked the Landmarks Preservation Commission to protect the building, but it did not, so they also filed suit to save it. NYU officials said they did not consider the Poe house, or the Judson House on the same block (between Sullivan and Thompson Streets), important enough to save. Both were razed for construction of Furman Hall. Although NYU promised to incorporate a rebuilt Poe House into the new building, using original materials, officials eventually claimed not to have enough bricks to do so, and preservationists said the antique simulacrum revealed in 2003 did not resemble the razed building.
- St. Ann's Church – An unusual-looking high-rise in the East Village – the neighborhood's tallest – is a symbol of another conflict between the school's plans and residents' desires. On the site of the demolished St. Ann's Church on East 12th Street between Third and Fourth Avenues, the university planned to build a dorm and solicited community input on its plans. The community asked that the 240-foot-tall building be scaled back, only to find in 2006 that construction plans were moving ahead to build a 26-story dormitory. That building, Founder's Hall, now towers over one preserved wall of the former St. Ann's Church, the gray stone façade facing E. 12th Street.
- Provincetown Playhouse and Apartments – Located at 133-139 MacDougal Street, this four-story complex hosted performances of works by playwrights from Edna St. Vincent Millay to Eugene O'Neill to Sam Shepard in its playhouse, while artists and others found shelter in the apartments above. In 2008 the school proposed to demolish the entire building and rebuild a facility for the law school, as well as a new theater. The same year, the New York State Office of Parks, Recreation and Historic Preservation responded positively to GVSHP's request that the building be found eligible for listing on the State and National Registers of Historic Places. In the face of community opposition, NYU agreed to preserve just six percent of the old building: the walls containing the small theater in the southern corner of the building. However, during construction, behind construction barriers and invisible from the street, NYU secretly tore down parts of the walls they promised to preserve, a fact publicly revealed by GVSHP.
- NYU 2031 – This ambitious plan for the university's expansion was met by wide resistance both among unaffiliated city residents, and among university faculty and staff. Not only did community members consider the plan itself an abrogation of the "Planning Principles" that came out of the Community Task Force, but a new group formed called NYU Faculty Against the Sexton Plan (NYU FASP). When the city approved the 2031 plan, FASP, GVSHP and others filed suit to stop it. In January 2014, State Supreme Court Justice Donna Mills halted the plan based on illegal takings of parkland, but NYU appealed.

=== Recent construction ===
Over the last few years, NYU has developed a number of new facilities on and around its Washington Square campus.

The Kimmel Center for University Life, named for benefactors Helen and Martin Kimmel, was built in 2003 to house the majority of the University's student services offices. The center also houses the Skirball Center for the Performing Arts, the Rosenthal Pavilion, the Eisner & Lubin Auditorium, and the Loeb Student Center. The Jack H. Skirball Center for the Performing Arts is a professionally operated and programmed 850-seat proscenium theater. Presentations there have included the Abbey Theater of Dublin's Playboy of the Western World, the world premiere of Mabou Mines Red Beads, a series of concerts by World Music Institute, and a series of superlative dance companies, including Lar Lubovitch and Bill T. Jones. The Skirball Center is the largest performing arts facility south of 42nd Street.

The School of Law's Furman Hall, built in 2004, was named for NYU Law alumnus Jay Furman (JD '71). Rebuilt elements of two historic buildings were incorporated into the new facade, one of which was occupied by poet Edgar Allan Poe.

In 2005, NYU announced the development of a new life science facility on Waverly Place. The facility will accommodate laboratories and related academic space for the life sciences and will be the first NYU science building developed since the opening of Meyer Hall in 1971.

In November 2005, NYU announced plans to build a 26-floor, 190,000-square-foot (18,000 m^{2}) residence hall on 12th Street. The residence hall was expected to accommodate about 700 undergraduates and contain a host of other student facilities. It was expected to be the tallest building in the East Village. The plans have caused anger among East Village and other New York City residents, as the new building would be built over the old St. Ann's Church. Following construction, the new residence hall was named Founders Hall.

A new $1.3 billion building was opened in 2021, which replaced the Coles Sports and Recreation Center at 404 Lafayette Street, formerly located on the site. The building includes a gym, a swimming pool, three theaters and classrooms. It is topped by two towers with faculty and student housing.

== Brooklyn campus ==
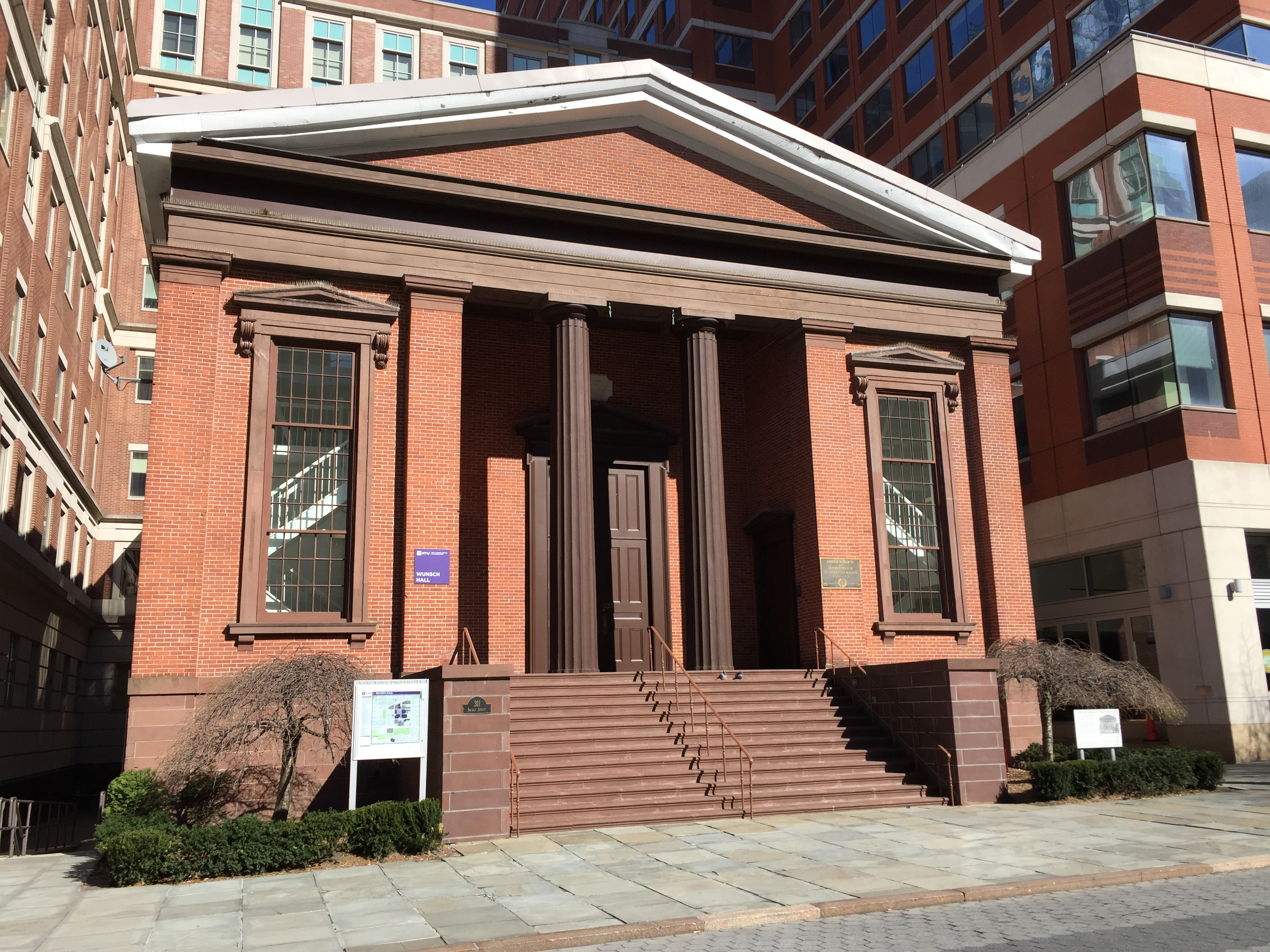
Wunsch Building, a former church

The Tandon School of Engineering is located in Downtown Brooklyn. It is centrally located in the MetroTech Center and is close to transportation routes and easily accessible from all parts of New York City and Long Island. The Brooklyn campus offers programs for undergraduates students as well as for graduate students, including those executive programs for students with related experience.

The engineering school played a leadership role in bringing about MetroTech Center, one of the largest urban university-corporate parks in the world and the largest in the United States. Today, the 16-acre (65,000 m²), $1 billion complex is home to the institute and several technology-dependent companies, including Securities Industry Automation Corporation (SIAC), New York City Police Department's 911 Center, New York City Fire Department Headquarters and the U.S. technology and operations functions of JPMorgan Chase. In 1998, a Marriott Hotel was built adjacent to MetroTech. MetroTech has proven to be a case study in effective university, corporate, government and private-developer cooperation. It has resulted in renewing an area that once was characterized more by urban decay.

The Wunsch Building, which now houses the NYU Wasserman Center for Career Development's Brooklyn Office, dates back to 1847 and was the first independent black church in Brooklyn. It was also a stop on the Underground Railroad and has been designated a historic landmark since November 24, 1981.

The Bern Dibner Library of Science and Technology, opened in 1990, is the engineering school's library. In addition, wireless networks allow users with notebook computers to access the library's electronic services from anywhere on campus.

The Brooklyn campus also houses the Center for Urban Science and Progress as well as several of Tisch School of the Arts and Steinhardt School of Culture, Education, and Human Development's degree programs. The Brooklyn campus houses NYU's Game Center Open Library, which is the largest collection of games held by any university in the world. In 2014, NYU Langone Medical Center acquired a 125,000 square foot healthcare facility in Brooklyn.

Design and engineering work for the full renovation and fit-out of 370 Jay Street in Brooklyn is underway. Construction began in February 2015, and NYU started moving into the building in December 2017. The 460,000-square-foot building, which NYU acquired in 2013, is adjacent to its Tandon School of Engineering.

== Medical campus ==
The main NYU medical campus is situated at the East River waterfront at First Ave. between East 30th and 34th Streets. The campus hosts the Medical School, Tisch Hospital, and the Rusk Institute of Rehabilitation Medicine. Other NYU Centers across the city include NYU Hospital for Joint Diseases and the Bellevue Hospital Center. NYU's Ehrenkranz School of Social Work manages branch campus programs in Westchester County at Manhattanville College and in Rockland County at St. Thomas Aquinas College. In Sterling Forest, near Tuxedo, New York, NYU has a research facility that contains several institutes, in particular the Nelson Institute of Environmental Medicine. The Midtown Center at 11 West 42nd Street and the Woolworth Building in the financial district are home to NYU's continuing education programs.

=== Recent construction ===
- Ronald O. Perelman Center for Emergency Services, completed in 2014.
- Energy Building, completed in 2016.
- 16-story Science Building, will be completed in 2017.
- 21-story Helen L. and Martin S. Kimmel Pavilion, will be completed in 2018.

== Foreign facilities ==
NYU has an extensive study abroad program in which a good portion of the student body participates. Unlike most other universities, NYU has its own international facilities in several countries. One noteworthy example is the 57-acre (230,000 m^{2}) campus of NYU Florence at Villa La Pietra in Italy, bequeathed by the late Sir Harold Acton to NYU in 1994. NYU manages undergraduate academic year study abroad programs at NYU Florence, NYU London, NYU Paris, NYU Prague, NYU Berlin, NYU Accra, NYU Madrid, NYU Shanghai, NYU Buenos Aires, NYU Tel Aviv, NYU Abu Dhabi, NYU Washington, DC, and NYU Sydney.

== International houses on campus ==
NYU has several international houses to foster the study of international culture and languages. The international houses have their own classroom space, libraries, offices, and often host campus events. The NYU international houses are:

- Casa Italiana Zerilli-Marimò
- La Maison Française
- Deutsches Haus
- Glucksman Ireland House
- King Juan Carlos I of Spain Center
- Hagop Kevorkian Center
- Africa House
- China House

NYU was also the founding member of the League of World Universities.

== Residence halls ==
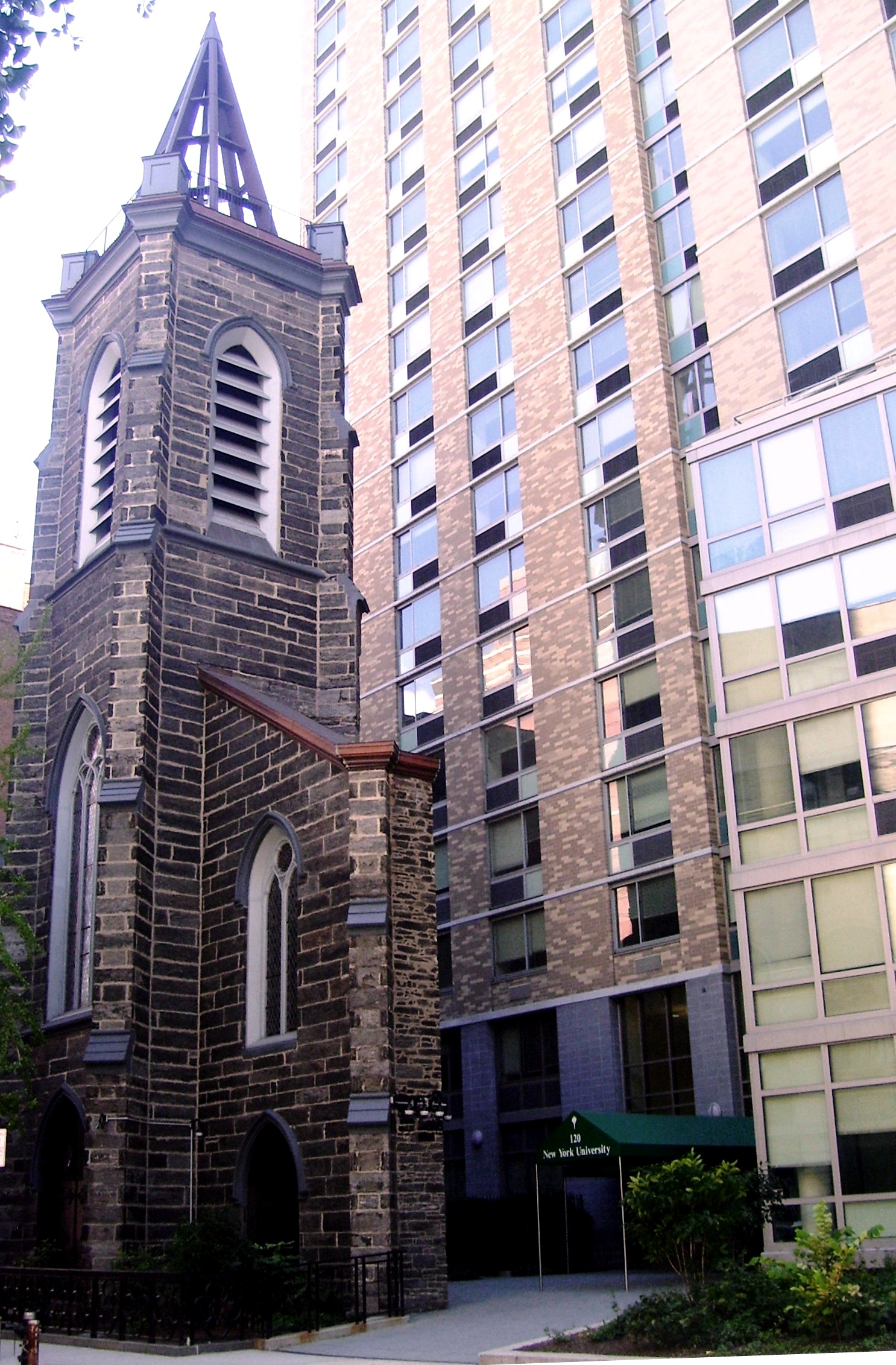
Founder's Hall

With 12,500 residents, NYU has the seventh largest university housing system in the U.S. and the largest among private schools. Uniquely, many of NYU residence halls are converted apartment complexes or old hotels. Most freshman residence halls are in the Washington Square area. While nearly all the upper classmen dorms are in the Union Square area, a few of them are as far as the Financial District, Manhattan. Until the Spring 2005 semester, NYU used a lottery system to determine eligibility for residence hall preference. Under this system, a student received one point for every semester they had lived in campus housing. Freshmen are freed from the lottery system and are by tradition placed in the halls closest to the main campus area. Therefore, historically, most of the students who lived in dorms found off-campus were sophomores. However, beginning in the fall 2006 semester, sophomores received priority housing, giving them first choice of residence halls. The purpose of this initiative was to keep the sophomore class together in the Union Square area. As a result, the junior class (class of 2008) and the senior class (class of 2007) never benefited from first choice as sophomores or seniors. The university operates its own transit system to transport its students, by bus or trolley, to campus. Undergraduate students are guaranteed housing during their enrollment at NYU.

Twenty-two buildings are in NYU's undergraduate housing system in the United States. In general, NYU residence halls receive favorable ratings, and some are opulent. Many rooms are spacious and contain amenities considered rare for individual college residence hall rooms, such as kitchens and living rooms/common areas, one residence hall even has maid service. All residence halls are staffed by 24-hour security staff, contain multiple resident assistants (RAs), and several halls contain faculty in residence. Unlike many other universities, NYU rooms all have their own bathrooms and thus no common bathrooms exist. Many residence halls have their own dining hall, and the university has meal choices to suit various diets. Almost all the residence halls have a laundry room that is open to resident students 24 hours a day.

All the residence halls are governed by the Inter-Residence Hall Council (IRHC), an umbrella student council organization. Each hall elects student representatives to the IRHC, and those representatives meet with one another to form committees and vote on an executive board. The goal of this group is to create programs for university students and to act as a link to university administration. Hometalk ranked NYU's student residences third in the United States in its list of best college dorms.

== Recent acquisitions ==
Some of the recent acquisitions include, among others:

- In 2010, NYU purchased a 125,000 square foot building. Full renovation of 60 Fifth Avenue (formerly the Forbes Building) is expected to commence in February 2015.
- In 2014, NYU bought a 151,000-square-foot building in NoHo, Manhattan for $157 million and renovated it.
- In 2014, NYU acquired a 125,000 square foot healthcare facility in Brooklyn.
- In 2016, NYU bought a 94-unit rental building near Gramercy Park for $87.5 million. NYU purchased the building on behalf of its NYU School of Medicine to "provide housing primarily for trainees and staff, including house staff, post-docs, and researchers. NYU Langone Medical Center's Tisch Hospital is located a few blocks north of the property, with other NYU medical facilities also located nearby on Manhattan's East Side".
- In 2016, NYU signed a 30-year agreement to take 390,000 square feet of space at 222 East 41st, including all 25 floors, the lobby, common areas and the parking garage.
- In 2016, NYU acquired Winthrop University Hospital.
- In 2018, NYU acquired 27 Washington Square N., a residential building with 27 units built in 1900.
