= Beatrice Lumpkin =

American union organizer, activist and writer (1918–2026)

- Born: Beatrice Shapiro; August 3, 1918; New York City, U.S.
- Died: June 14, 2026 (aged 107); Hyde Park, Chicago, U.S.
- Education: Hunter College (BA); Northeastern Illinois University (MA); Illinois Institute of Technology (MS)
- Political party: Communist Party
- Spouses: Roderick Mohrherr (div. 1947); Frank Lumpkin (m. 1949; died 2010)
- Children: 4

Beatrice Lumpkin (née Shapiro; August 3, 1918 – June 14, 2026) was an American union organizer, activist, academic and writer. She was a member of the Communist Party and the Chicago Teachers Union, as well as an organizer for several other unions. She was a tenured professor at Malcolm X College, wrote several books about history and mathematics, and was a co-founder of the Coalition of Labor Union Women.

== Early life and education ==
Lumpkin was born Beatrice Shapiro on August 3, 1918, in The Bronx, New York, to Morris Shapiro (born Avrom Hirschenhorn) and Dora Shapiro (born Ruhde Chernin), who were Russian immigrants of Jewish descent. They were members of the Jewish Labour Bund, a socialist organization in Russia. During the 1905 Russian Revolution, Beatrice's father was arrested and beaten, but escaped from prison and obtained a fake passport bearing his new name to move to the United States. He entered through Ellis Island and eventually settled on the Lower East Side of Manhattan. Beatrice's mother, who had helped her future husband escape, went to join him in 1906, and they were soon married. They both worked in the clothing manufacturing industry; Dora worked in Greenwich Village at the Triangle Shirtwaist Factory but was pregnant and not present during the 1911 fire at the factory. Their first child Max was born soon after, and the family moved to the Bronx where they owned and operated a laundry business.

She was the second of three children; her younger brother died when he was a child. She graduated from James Monroe High School, where she joined the National Student League and the Young Communist League USA. She then attended Hunter College to study history, earning a BA in 1939. After working as a factory worker for several years, she graduated from Northeastern Illinois State College in 1967 with an Master in Teaching and from Illinois Institute of Technology in 1974 with an MS.

== Career and activism ==
Lumpkin's first job was as a factory worker in 1933, at the age of 14; she lied about her age so she could get a fifteen-cent-an-hour position assembling radio tubes. Soon after, she wrote her first flyer titled "Are you satisfied?" and helped organize African-American laundry workers, in Harlem and the Bronx, who were paid low-wages during the Great Depression. She joined the Metal Workers Industrial Union, later part of the Congress of Industrial Organizations. While at Hunter College, she helped organize a student strike to protest American militarism in 1935, for which she was suspended from the school. She was suspended again two years later for putting together an antifascist student conference. She was also an organizer for the Laundry Workers Industrial Union and joined the Communist Party from an early age. In 1937, she was hired by the Congress of Industrial Organizations, along with 15 others, for a campaign to organize 30,000 laundry workers into a union. She also joined marches protesting the imprisonment of the Scottsboro Nine and the Italian invasion of Ethiopia.

In 1939, after graduating from college, she moved to Brooklyn to work at a laundry and became a leader of the Local 328. She later became a radio technician at a factory and joined the United Electrical Workers. Beginning in 1942, she was an electronics technician in Buffalo, New York. During and soon after World War II, she was an activist for the renters' rights, and helped organized strikes and tenant associations. When her family was evicted during this period, the landlord told the judge about her association with the Communist Party, leading to the eviction being upheld. In the late 1940s, Lumpkin organized a committee in support of the Progressive Party candidate, Henry A. Wallace, the former vice president, who ran for president in the 1948 elections.

As part of the civil rights movement in the 1950s and 1960s, Lumpkin protested Jim Crow laws and resisted against segregated public areas with her African-American husband, Frank Lumpkin, a fellow union organizer and member of Communist Party. In the mid-1960s, she became a Chicago Public School teacher and later joined the Crane Junior College, which became Malcolm X College, where she was an tenured professor. She was a co-founder of the Coalition of Labor Union Women in 1974 and remained a member of the Chicago Teachers Union.

In 1979, Lumpkin wrote her first book, Senefer, A Young Genius in Old Egypt, a children's book about an Egyptian mathematician. She late wrote, Always Bring a Crowd!: The Story of Frank Lumpkin, Steelworker (1999), a memoir of her husband's 17-year legal battle to restore the lost pensions and wages of 3,000 of his co-workers at the Wisconsin Steel plant in South Side which closed down in 1980. In 2013, she wrote an autobiography, Joy in the Struggle: My Life and Love.

In 2016, Lumpkin helped found Intergen, an inter-generational and multi-racial activist alliance.

== Personal life and death ==
Beatrice married her first husband, Roderick Mohrherr, sometime before the end of World War II in 1945; they were divorced in 1947 after having two children. On October 22, 1949, she married Frank Lumpkin with whom she had two more children. Her second husband was an African-American steel worker and union organizer, with whom she moved to Gary, Indiana, in the 1950s and settled in Chicago in 1962. As an interracial couple, they were met with hostility and discrimination both in New York and Chicago. Frank died on March 1, 2010.

In the reference book series Contemporary Authors, she listed hiking and traveling as her hobbies and the Golden Rule as her religion. Both she and Frank considered themselves humanists.

Lumpkin said she voted in every US presidential election since 1940. In October 2020, she made headlines in several publications when she donned personal protective equipment modeled after a hazmat suit while dropping her vote-by-mail ballot for the year's elections held during the COVID-19 pandemic.

Lumpkin died on June 14, 2026, at the age of 107.

== Bibliography ==
- Senefer: A Young Genius in Old Egypt. DuSable Museum Press. 1979. OCLC 1109239468.
- Senefar and Hatshepsut: A Novel of Egyptian Genius. DuSable Museum Press. 1983.
- African and African-American Contributions to Mathematics. Portland Public Schools. 1987. OCLC 77568882.
- Multicultural Science and Math Connections: Middle School Projects and Activities. Co-authored with Dorothy Strong. Walch Publishing. 1995. ISBN 978-0-8251-2659-8.
- Math: A Rich Heritage. Globe Fearon. 1996. ISBN 978-0-8359-1833-6.
- Geometry Activities from Many Cultures. Walch Publishing. 1997. ISBN 978-0-8251-3285-8.
- "Africa in the Mainstream of Mathematics History". Ethnomathematics: Challenging Eurocentrism in Mathematics Education. Powell, Arthur B.; Frankenstein, Marilyn (eds.). SUNY Press. 1997. ISBN 978-0-7914-3351-5.
- Algebra Activities from Many Cultures. Walch Publishing. 1997. ISBN 978-0-8251-3284-1.
- "Always Bring a Crowd!": The Story of Frank Lumpkin, Steelworker. International Publishers. 1999. ISBN 978-0-7178-0725-3.
- Joy in the Struggle: My Life and Love. International Publishers Company. 2018 [Originally published in 2013]. ISBN 978-0-7178-0762-8.
