= Silver Center =

Building at New York University

Coordinates: 40.7303091°N 73.9956898°W

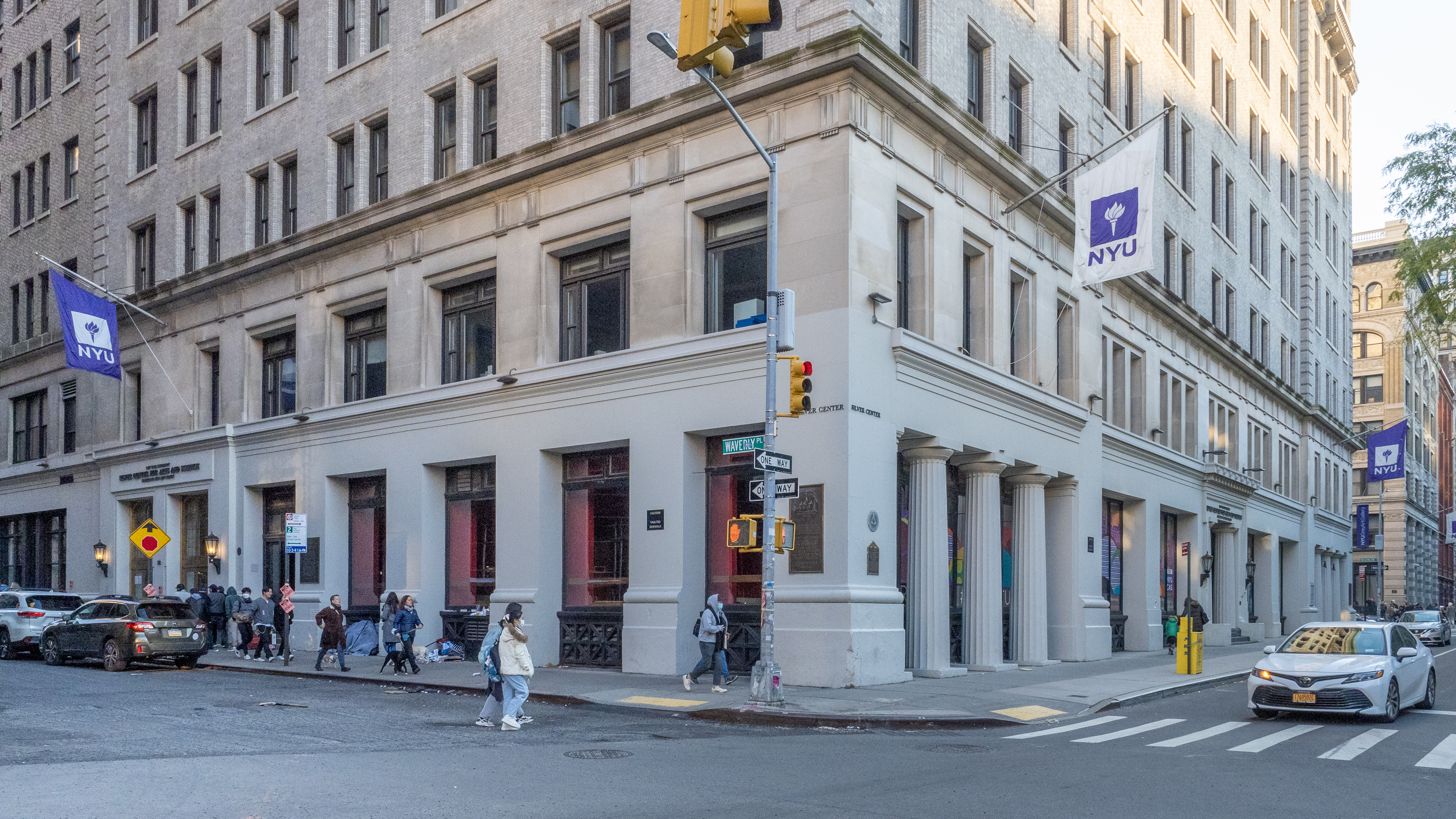
Silver Center in 2021

The Silver Center for Arts and Science (formerly Main Building) is the home of the New York University College of Arts and Science at 32 Waverly Place, Greenwich Village, Manhattan, New York City. The Dean of the College of Arts & Science and the college administration are located in this facility on the eastern border of Washington Square Park.

== History ==
At the time of its construction in 1892, this facility was named Main Building. In 2002, it was renamed the "Silver Center of Arts & Science" in honor of Julius Silver, an alumnus of the College of Arts & Science, who bequeathed $150 million to the college. Renovations have dramatically improved the facility while maintaining the building's many historic features. Main Building previously served as the home of NYU's Washington Square College until all undergraduate liberal arts education was consolidated at the Washington Square in 1973 after the sale of the University Heights campus in the Bronx.

The current building was designed by Alfred Zucker, a German born and trained architect, in 1892. It replaced architects' Town, Davis & Dakin's original Gothic Revival structure from 1835. Zucker maintained the foundation and many other features of the original university building but not the Gothic facade, partially for sake of historic continuity. Today, NYU owns nine other buildings designed by Zucker that were built in this formerly commercial area, as lofts and wholesale stores. The Brown Building of Science (formerly the Asch Building) and the Waverly Building occupy the same block as the Silver Center. The Brown Building was the site of the Triangle Shirtwaist Factory fire, which generated many of New York City's current labor laws. The three buildings are internally connected at the ground floor as well as by stairway and elevator (with the idiosyncrasy of adjacent floors that do not correspond by floor number.) The three buildings are known are the "Main block."

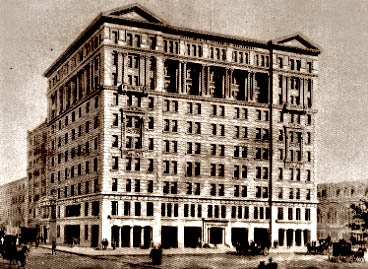
The Silver Center circa 1900

Initially, the light brick, stone and terra-cotta edifice housed University College and the School of Law. During those early years, in addition to serving as NYU's main academic building, the university rented offices, studio space and residential apartments within the building and the American Book Company also rented space in the building. This combination of institutional and commercial tenants is apparent in the building's tripartite facade design. The university's academic presence on the three top floors was marked by engaged Ionic columns capped by pediments. In 1927, due to the pressures of a growing post-war student body, NYU ejected commercial tenants to use the space for academic purposes.

The building was formerly home to the NYU's Grey Art Gallery. In 2024 they moved into a purpose designed location in Cooper Square, Manhattan. As part of the move, the renamed to become the Grey Art Museum.

Samuel Colt developed the revolver and Samuel Morse invented the telegraph; John William Draper in 1840 took the first photograph in the United States in the original Main Building that the present structure replaced. Edgar Allan Poe, Herman Melville, Walt Whitman lived and taught and privately lectured there, Winslow Homer painted there, and architects Alexander Jackson Davis and Richard Morris Hunt had offices there.
