= Triangle Fire Memorial =

Memorial in New York City

Coordinates: 40°43′48″N 73°59′43″W

The Triangle Fire Memorial is a memorial at the Brown Building in the Greenwich Village neighborhood of Manhattan in New York City. It commemorates the 1911 Triangle Shirtwaist Factory fire, which killed 146 workers, primarily Italian and Jewish immigrant women and girls, and is considered a catalyst in the American labor rights movement. It was designed by Richard Joon Yoo and Uri Wegman.

It was officially unveiled on October 11, 2023, more than a century after the fire occurred.

The memorial was created after years of effort from the Remember the Triangle Fire Coalition, whose members include descendants of the victims.

== History ==
Prior to the memorial's installation, there were three plaques on nearby buildings noting the disaster.

In 2010, the Remember the Triangle Fire Coalition began planning to bring a memorial to the site. In 2013, They put together a committee to judge design proposals, which included Deborah Berke and Yeohlee Teng. A total of 176 entries from 30 countries were submitted, with Yoo and Wegman's design, "Reframing the Sky", winning in 2013. The memorial's construction was funded by a $1.5 million grant from the state of New York, which was given in 2015. The budget was later raised to $2.4 million, after investigations revealed that structural issues in the building might not allow it to hold the weight of the memorial.

The design was approved by the Landmark Preservation Commission in 2019. In 2021, New York's Public Design Commission approved the design as well.

In 2019, members of the public were invited to contribute pieces of cloth, which were combined into a "Collective Ribbon" spanning 300 feet (91 meters). This ribbon design was later etched onto the steel used in the memorial.

The memorial's opening ceremony in 2023 was attended by multiple labor groups, including SAG-AFTRA striking actors and nail technicians seeking to unionize.

== Memorial ==
The memorial includes a steel ribbon descending from the building, before splitting into two horizontal ribbons, twelve feet above street level, on the corner of the building. The ribbons are meant to evoke mourning ribbons, which were traditionally draped on building facades by communities in mourning. The horizontal ribbons list the names and ages of all 146 victims, with the letters and numbers being holes in the steel. For married women, both their birth names and married names are included, in part to highlight the family connections between victims.

Under the ribbon is a reflective panel, allowing visitors to see the sky through the letters and numbers on the ribbon. The reflective panel also contains quotes from eyewitnesses about the event, in English, Italian, and Yiddish, reflecting the backgrounds of the victims. Another panel includes a description of the event and its impact, also written in English, Italian, and Yiddish.

An additional vertical steel ribbon was installed in June 2024; it extends up the side of the building, dividing into two at the third floor, and eventually reaching the ninth floor, where many of the workers were trapped and from which many jumped.
