= Ruth Sergel =

Ruth Sergel is an American director, writer, activist, and interactive technology designer in New York City. She works across multiple mediums to exploit technical prowess while creating opportunities for community engagement. Her work has been supported by NYSCA, The Jerome Foundation, and the Experimental Television Center amongst others. Her films were screened at MOMA, Tribeca Film Festival, and aired on PBS and the Interdependent Film Channel (IFC). Ruth was also a Resident Researcher at the Interactive Telecommunications Program at New York University Tisch School of the Arts and teaches interactive technology and video in various contexts. Her main efforts focus on art and social engagement.

== Public work ==
Sergel is the founder and leader of the Triangle Fire Coalition which grew out of her commemorative art project Chalk. The creation of these projects and their impact is recounted in her book, See You In the Streets: Art, Action and Remembering the Triangle Shirtwaist Factory Fire. Her public art work includes Voices of 9.11 documenting the lived experiences of the September 11 attacks.

- Triangle Fire Coalition – Ruth is the founder of the Remember the Triangle Fire Coalition, a group action to strengthen and coordinate the diverse initiatives to commemorate the infamous Triangle Shirtwaist Factory Fire for the March 25, 2011 centennial and the establishment of a permanent memorial. The Remember the Triangle Fire Coalition is composed of over 200 partners nationwide.
- Chalk – Collective action where volunteers fan out across the city to inscribe in chalk the names and ages of the victims in front of their former homes. (2004 – present)
- Voices of 9.11 – A video oral history archive with over 550 testimonies from survivors, witnesses and first responders in New York City, Shanksville, PA, Washington DC and inside the Pentagon of the September 11 attacks recorded in private video booths to be published on-line. Voices of 9.11 was established at here is New York: a democracy of photographs and has been exhibited at the Corcoran Gallery of Art and the New York Historical Society. (2002–2003). The testimonies were placed online in 2011 at Voices of 9.11
- $700 billion for the arts... Because we're too big to fail!! – Initiative to strengthen the artists position politically in the face of the US government bail-out plan for failing banks and insurance companies. (2009)

$700 billion for the arts on Facebook

== Films ==
Sergel's films include:

- "Belle" (2004) – a fable of old age and beauty. Created together with a group of 83- to 90-year-old women who performed and advised in the process of its making.
- "CUSP" (2000) – portrays a girl hitting early adolescence and the ensuing turmoil in her world, a film about friendship and struggle at an age when identity is at stake. It premiered at New Directors/New Films (MOMA) and aired on PBS and Interdependent Film Channel (IFC).
- "Bruce" (1998) - three minutes with dancer Bruce Jackson in his wheelchair. It premiered at the Los Angeles Independent Film Festival and aired on PBS.

Some of these films were screened at New York City's MOMA and the Tribeca Film Festival.

== Live performance ==
- Alchemy of Light – Multi-media performance that melds 19th century illusionism with current interactive technologies. Alchemy of Light depicts the life of the legendary magician Torrini as a parable from a time when our lives first became mediated by machines. Work in progress. (2010 – present)
- Pisces Vorat Maior Minorem – Site-specific performance created as part of an international residency at CESTA in the Czech Republic. (2006)
- Don't Worry – Video for live performance of Don't worry in collaboration with LOSS for Torino Contemporanea 3 (2006)

== Interactive installations ==
- Magic Box – Wooden box with peepholes at opposite ends and two projection installations inside. Peering inside the box one can watch a film that is not visible to the other viewer. At dark moments, one can see through the box into the eyes of the other participant. The sliders on the front panel of the box select which film is visible to each viewer. If both people move to the far position of the slider their hands will touch. Exhibited at the Shift Festival 2009 (Basel, Switzerland and 3 LD Art & Technology Center (New York City). (2008)

Video documentation of Shift Festival (for Magic Box see the title image and the video at 3min. 33 sec.)

- For Ethel (2007), Turing Machine (2007), and Al (2005) see Streetpictures.org

== Awards ==
- 2017, American Book Award
