= David Meyerowitz =

Latvian-born composer (1867–1943)

David Meyerowitz (Yiddish דוד מאיראװיץ, April 2, 1867 – 1943) was a Latvian-born composer active in the early Yiddish theater. His music was oriented mainly to vaudeville and revue formats.

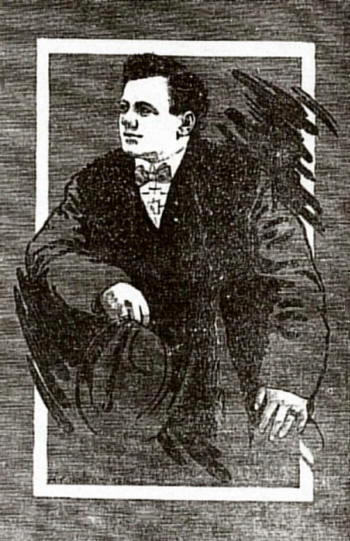
David Meyerowitz, Yiddish-language lyricist and composer

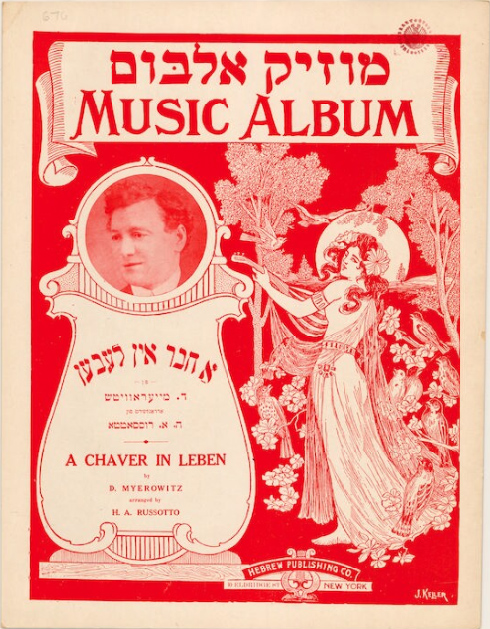
David Meyerowitz, sheet music cover, 1917

== Early life ==
Meyerowitz was born Dinaberg, Latvia, then part of czarist Russia. Growing up in a poor family he had to go to work in a match factory at a young age. He had his start there as a songster by singing for his co-workers. In 1888 his father came to the U.S. To support himself and his family, and to pay for his passage to America, he sang Abraham Goldfaden operettas and Eliakum Zunser ballads, and old Russian folk songs. In 1890 his father bought him to America. With no formal education, only later did he become literate in English and Yiddish.

== Musical career ==
After coming to America, he lived on the Lower East Side of Manhattan and continued doing menial work, working with his father in a rag shop, all the while composing songs in his mind. He sang at small venues and gatherings, getting attention and small remunerations. He joined Gilrod's Yiddish vaudeville theater troupe where he sang and wrote for other performers. Meyerowitz became known as "the wandering poet." By age 30 he had graduated from cafe concerts to the Grand Music Hall, at the corner of Orchard and Grand Streets, a Yiddish variety and vaudeville theater on the Lower East Side. He furnished the theater with an original operetta every week as well as writing five to a dozen new songs a week for the actors. He also sang in, directed and produced these operettas. Meyerowitz could not read or write music; he would sing a song for the conductor who would transcribe the music. His best known songs were written for leading Yiddish producers: He created songs for the Yiddish actor and producer Jacob P. Adler, including "Aheym" for the play The Power of Nature. When impresario Boris Thomashefsky wanted a Zionist-themed song for the play Tate mame tzores (Heartbreak, Papa and Mama), Myerowitz wrote "Kum, srul, kum aheym" (Come, Little Srul, Come Home). His one act operettas played at all of the 14 Yiddish music and vaudeville houses that once existed in New York simultaneously.

In his music he addressed political, social and political themes of the times. He wrote the music for the song Die Fire Korbunes (The Fire Victims). This was elegy to the 146 immigrant young girls, mainly Jewish and Italian, who died in the 1911 Triangle Shirtwaist Factory fire. He showed his patriotism in an early song, "Kolombus, ikh hob tzu dir gornit" (Columbus, I’ve Got Nothing Against You!), with the words: “And I have nothing against you either, America! You’re very good to us, and life here is happy; you’re okay!" In "Got Un Zayn Mishpet Iz Gerekt" he alludes to the 1903 pogrom in Russia. An ardent Zionist, he also wrote "Zion's Liedel."

He has been described as a member of a "galaxy of coupletists," who have been credited with creating the genre of Yiddish parodies of American hit songs. The coupletists generally used the songs to discuss the plight of the Jewish immigrants. The genre has been described as the Yiddish equivalent of American popular song.

== Selected music ==
"A Gut Yor"
"Vos Geven Iz Geven Un Nito"
"Got Un Zayn Mishpet Iz Gerekt"
"Ikh For Aheym"
