= Laundry and Dry Cleaning International Union =

Former trade union of the United States

LDCIU
- Laundry and Dry Cleaning International Union
- Union merger: Service Employees International Union
- Founded: 1958
- Headquarters: Oakland, California
- Location: United States
- Key people: Russell Crowell, President
- Affiliations: Change to Win Federation

The Laundry and Dry Cleaning International Union is an AFL–CIO union in the United States. Based in Oakland, California, it was created as an alternative to the Laundry Workers International Union, which had been expelled from the AFL–CIO in 1958 for corruption. Russell Crowell was president of the new union from 1962 to 1983.

The organization merged with the Service Employees International Union in 1999, at which time it had 11,000 members.

== See also ==
- Laundry Workers Industrial Union
