= La Maison Française (New York University) =

University in New York City

Coordinates: 40°43′52.4″N 73°59′43″W

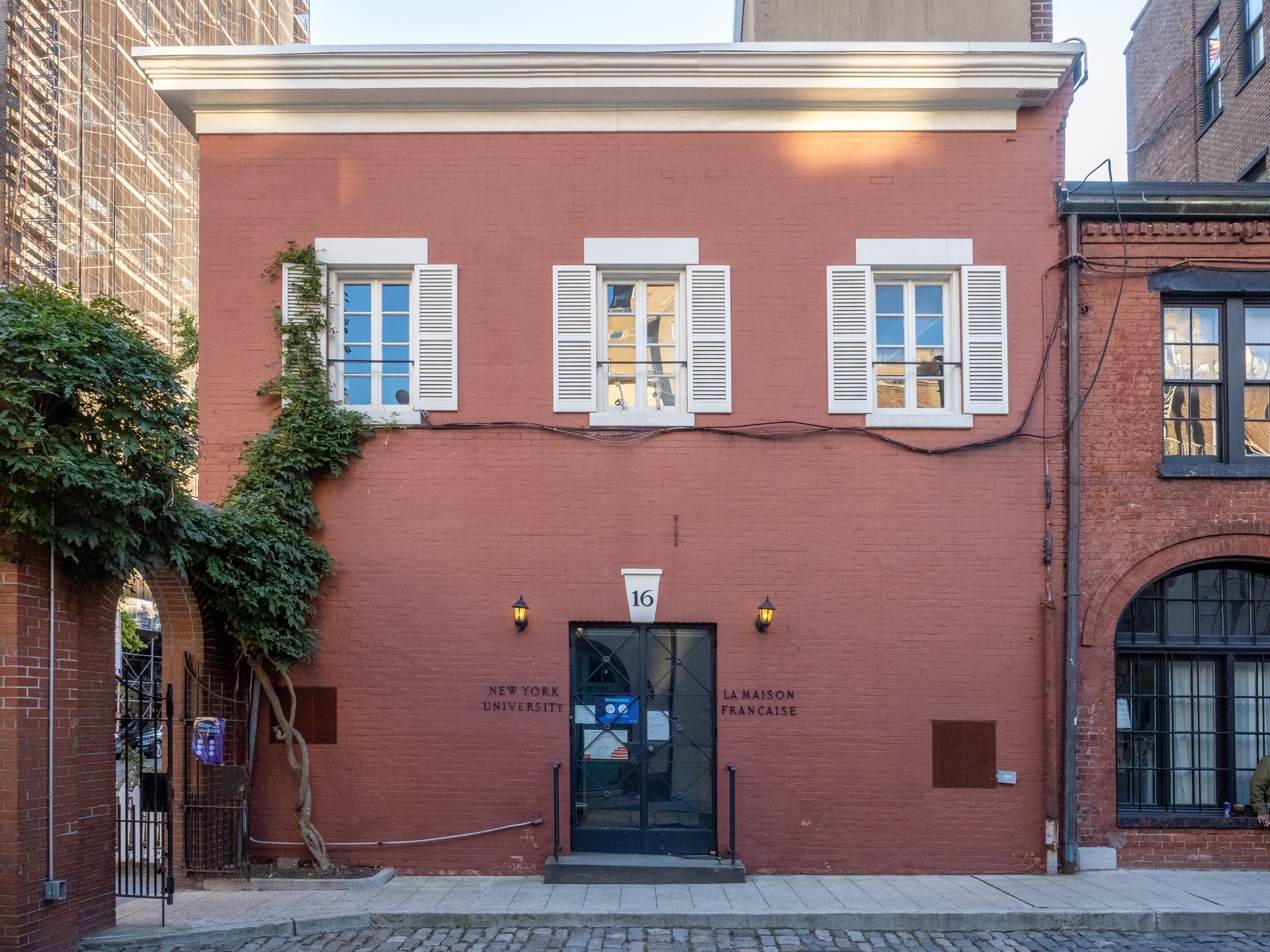
La Maison Française

La Maison Française is a Francophone university in Greenwich Village, New York City, affiliated with New York University.

Founded in 1957 by Professor Germaine Brée, La Maison Française occupies a 19th-century carriage house on Washington Mews.

François Noudelmann has been the Director of La Maison Française since 2019. The chair of its advisory board is Guy Sorman.

La Maison Française has programming in three areas: culture (including literature, theater, art, music and cinema), contemporary politics (including geopolitics, economy, human rights, race and gender), and the Francophone world. It also holds language classes for adults and children. La Maison Française is closely affiliated with the New York University Department of French Literature, Thought and Culture, as well as the university's Institute of French Studies.
