= Laundry Workers Industrial Union =

Former trade union of the United States

The Laundry Workers Industrial Union was a labor union affiliated with the Communist Party's Trade Union Unity League during the early 1930s. Established in 1931, the union organized laundry workers in New York City, and later became part of the non-Communist Amalgamated Clothing Workers of America. The union's membership was primarily African American and Afro-Caribbean women.

== History ==
In the late 19th century, the United States encountered a changing work force. The U.S. was the dominant global economy and leading industrial power. From 1865 until 1918, the United States saw an influx of European immigrants. This presented an issue, since the combination of poor immigrants and individuals scrambling for work created a surplus of individuals seeking employment, giving companies more leverage in setting working conditions. Although overall employment increased, this came with poor overall working conditions, which put the discontent of American employees into focus. Organized movements began as a means to channel this discontent, and one of the first organizations to have a significant impact on working conditions was the Knights of Labor.

During this time, with the aid of communists, industrial unionism was emerging in New York City's laundries. Around 1910, the prevalence of power laundry machines increased, which led industrialization of the laundry business and an increase in employment. Around 1930, employees were working for hotels, restaurants, and even middle and upper-class families to wash clothes. However, because of the bad working conditions in the industry, laundries relied on employees who had been excluded from other sectors. Laundry worker unionization took a while to achieve, as it was impeded by anti-union tactics and the overall poverty of employees. Women were especially treated poorly, and worked long hours for low wages. Gradually, laundry workers were unionized, including through the organizing efforts of Jessie Taft in Harlem, and related walk-outs and strikes. Laundry workers and the American Federation of Labor founded Local 204 in 1936, and by 1939, most laundry workers in NYC were members of the Congress of Industrial Organizations. The Laundry Workers Industrial Union was the first laundry union in New York City, and was one of the few in the country. Its successful efforts in organizing laundry workers helped inspire unions in other industries as well.

== See also ==
- Laundry and Dry Cleaning International Union
