= Waverly Place =

Street in Manhattan, New York

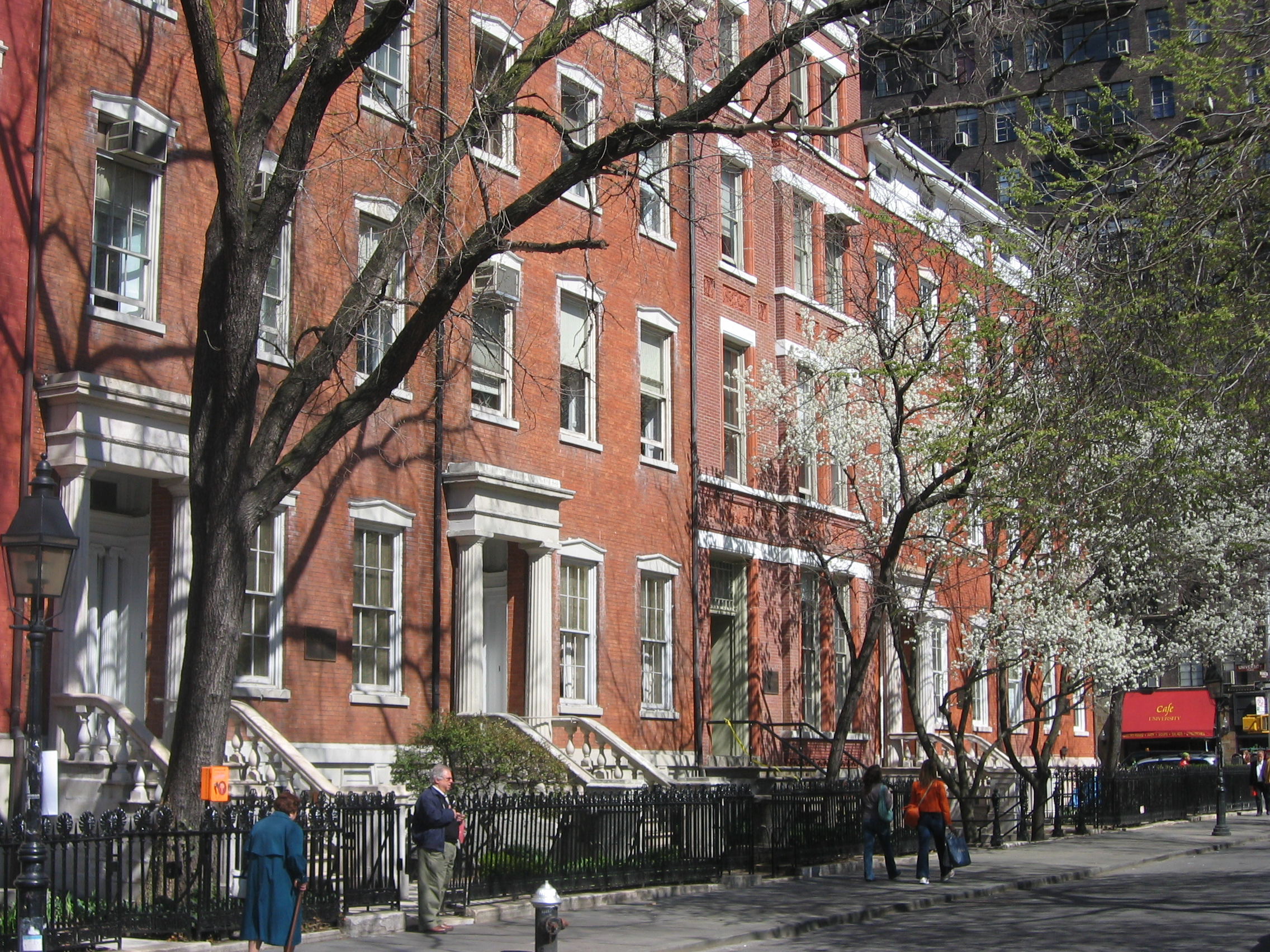
Waverly Place as the northern boundary of Washington Square Park

Waverly Place is a narrow street in the Greenwich Village section of the New York City borough of Manhattan, that runs from Bank Street to Broadway. Waverly changes direction roughly at its midpoint at Christopher Street, turning about 120 degrees from a north–south street to a northwest–southeast street. At Christopher Street, the traffic direction changes as well, from southbound to westbound. At the intersection where this transition occurs, Waverly branches into a Y, creating an intersection with itself.

The two blocks which form the northern border of Washington Square Park – from MacDougal Street to Fifth Avenue, and from Fifth Avenue to University Place – are called Washington Square North. In the block from Fifth to University, there is a unified line of Greek Revival townhouses, sometimes called "the Row", which are owned and used by New York University. Some of the buildings at the Fifth Avenue end have retained their exterior facades, but are connected together inside to make one larger building.

The street was named after Sir Walter Scott's 1814 novel Waverley in 1833; prior to that it was called Sixth Street.

== Washington Square North ==
In the 1840s, New York City's elite established Washington Square, far from the increasingly commercial environment of Lower Manhattan, as the address of choice. Anchored by the mansion of William C. Rhinelander at the center of Washington Square North, "the Row" of Greek Revival town houses on either side of Fifth Avenue presented the unified and dignified appearance of privilege. When the center of New York City society moved north after the American Civil War, the houses on the square came to represent the gentility of a bygone age. Henry James, whose grandmother lived at 18 Washington Square North, depicted this nostalgic view in his 1880 tragicomedic novel, Washington Square. Today, the buildings all belong to New York University.

The 1830s row house at 1–3 Washington Square North may be the house in the city most closely associated with a single artist. From 1913 until his death in May 1967, the artist Edward Hopper and his wife, Josephine, lived in a studio on the building's top floor. Chosen for its low rent and the artist's belief that his hero, the American artist Thomas Eakins had painted there, Hopper and his wife leased rooms that lacked central heat or private baths. They decorated their rooms simply, with pieces of early American furniture.

== In media ==
- On the television series Mad Men, Don Draper's bachelor pad is located on Waverly Place.
- The Disney Channel television series Wizards of Waverly Place and its spinoff Wizards Beyond Waverly Place are set there.
- One of the townhouses serves as the protagonist's residence in the 2007 film I Am Legend.
- The main characters in Rosina Lippi's Waverly Place novels live on Waverly Place.

== See also ==
- List of places named for George Washington
- List of streets in Manhattan
