= Brown Building (Manhattan) =

Building in Manhattan, New York

- Triangle Shirtwaist Factory
- U.S. National Register of Historic Places
- U.S. National Historic Landmark
- New York State Register of Historic Places
- New York City Landmark
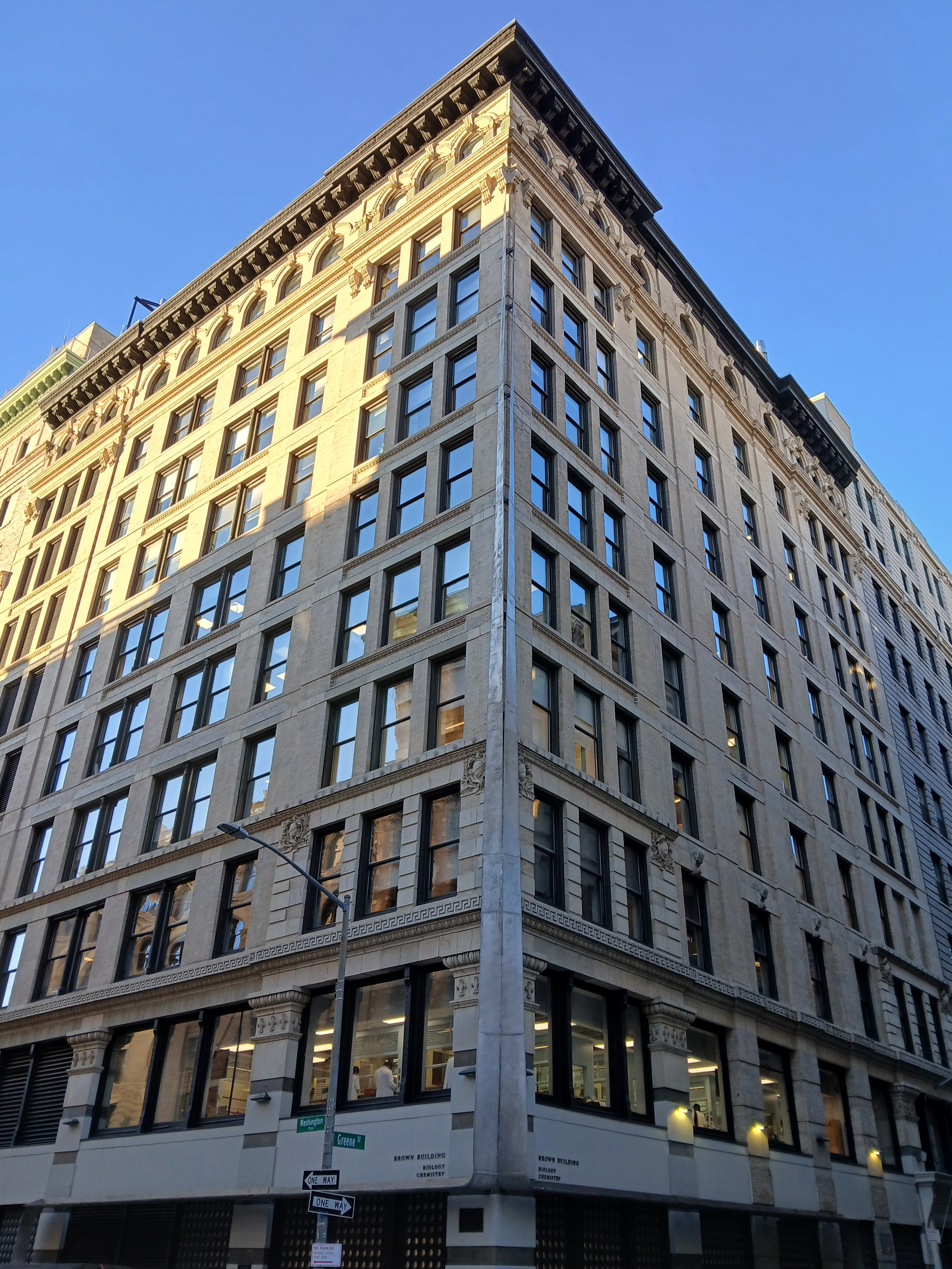
- (2025)

- Location within Manhattan Location within New York Location within the United States
- Location: 23–29 Washington Pl, Manhattan, New York City
- Coordinates: 40°43′48″N 73°59′43″W
- Built: 1900–01
- Architect: John Woolley
- Architectural style: Neo-Renaissance
- NRHP reference No.: 91002050
- NYSRHP No.: 06101.001819

Significant dates
- Added to NRHP: July 17, 1991
- Designated NYSRHP: July 17, 1991
- Designated NYCL: March 25, 2003

The Brown Building is a ten-story building that is part of the campus of New York University (NYU), which owns it. It is located at 23–29 Washington Place, between Greene Street and Washington Square East in the Greenwich Village neighborhood of Manhattan, New York City, and is best known as the location of the Triangle Shirtwaist Factory fire of March 25, 1911, which killed 146 people. The Triangle Fire Memorial is now located there.

The building was listed on the National Register of Historic Places and was named a National Historical Landmark in 1991. It was designated a New York City landmark on the 92nd anniversary of the fire in 2003.

== History ==
The iron and steel building was constructed in 1900–01, and was designed by John Woolley in the neo-Renaissance style. It was named the Asch Building after its owner, Joseph J. Asch. During that time, the Asch Building was known for its "fireproof" rooms, which attracted many garment makers, including the Triangle Shirtwaist Factory, which was the site of the Triangle Shirtwaist Factory fire that killed 146 garment workers on March 25, 1911.

The majority of the workers who occupied the Asch Building were female immigrants. The immigrants came to the United States for a better life, although they were working in terrible conditions within the factory and were underpaid. The building's top three floors were occupied by the Triangle Shirtwaist Factory, owned by Russian immigrants Max Blanck and Isaac Harris.

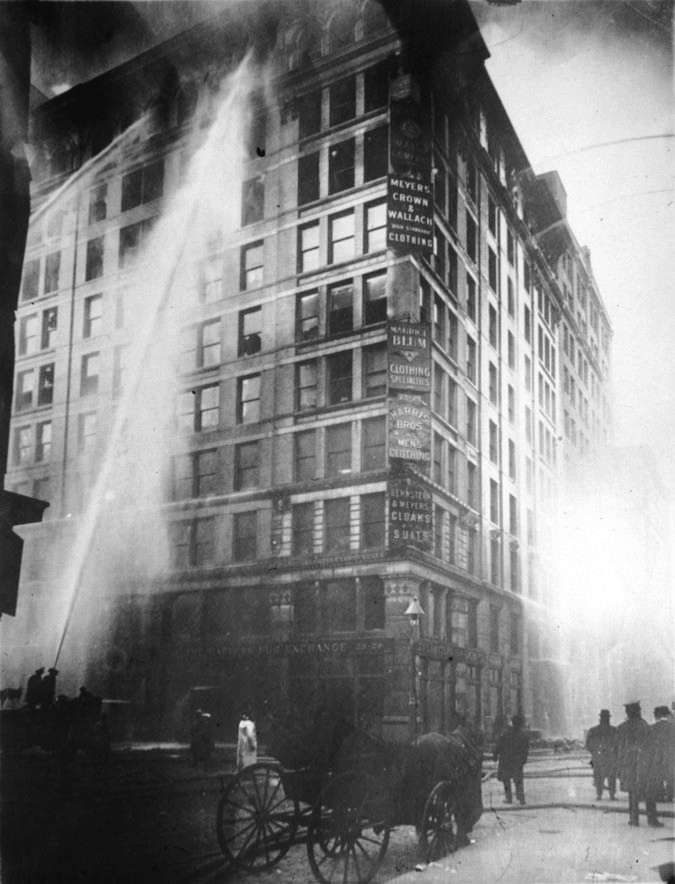
Triangle Shirtwaist Factory fire, March 25, 1911

Even though the workers, who included many immigrants, had paying jobs, their work environment was not comfortable or safe. Rooms were overcrowded with few working bathrooms and inadequate ventilation, which resulted in conditions ranging from sweltering heat to freezing cold. At the time of the fire, the Asch Building did not comply with several requirements that were needed to ensure safe working conditions and egress. The rooms in the upper three floors were packed with flammable objects, including clothing products hanging from lines above workers' heads, rows of tightly spaced sewing machines, cutting tables bearing bolts of cloth, and linen and cotton cuttings littering the floors, that allowed a massive spread of fire to occur in a matter of seconds. The building had a single fire escape that was not sound enough to hold many people, and there were no sprinklers installed in the building. The rooms on each floor were overcrowded because there was no limit at the time as to how many people could occupy one floor. The staircases did not have landings and the stairwells were poorly illuminated, resulting in unsafe, often dark conditions in the stairwells.

A survivor of the disaster stated that there had been a blue glow coming from a bin under a table where 120 layers of fabric had just been stacked prior to cutting. Fire rose from the bin, ignited the tissue paper templates hung from the ceiling, and spread across the room. Once ignited, the tissue paper floated off haphazardly from table to table, setting off fires as it went. Many people died directly from the fire from inhaling thick smoke or from being burned by the flames. Others died because they jumped out the building's windows to escape the flames, since the elevators stopped functioning properly because of the heat and the stairway was blocked. Workers piled up at the entrance of the stairway because the stairway, which had no landing, was too dark for one to see his or her way down the steps. In the panic, many people were crushed to death from behind while attempting to get through locked doors. As for the elevators, the owners and their family members, who were present, used the elevator, which only could have held twelve people, and escaped the building. Initially, the owner instructed the elevator operator not to send the elevator back up; by the time the elevator was sent back up, the fire had fully engulfed the eighth floor and was quickly spreading to the ninth. This caused panicked workers to jump out the windows or to jump down the nine-story elevator shaft. Although there was an additional external fire escape to evacuate the building, few managed to safely exit this way. The load of escaping workers using the fire escape eventually caused it to collapse. Prior to the fire escape’s collapse, people still could not make it to the ground safely, since the fire escape ladder did not reach the ground and was not close enough for people to safely jump down, which led to many more deaths.

The New York City Fire Department did not have the proper equipment to battle the fire. For example, their ladder “could only reach the sixth floor, fully two floors below the level of fire". The factory owners Max Blanck and Isaac Harris were charged with “criminal negligence”, and faced multiple lawsuits from the victims’ families. As a result of this fire, there were several new building and safety regulations, “such as mandatory fire drills, periodic fire inspections, working fire hoses, sprinklers, exit signs and fire alarms, doors that swung in the direction of travel and stairway size restrictions.” The fire led to wide-ranging legislation requiring improved factory safety standards and helped spur the growth of the International Ladies' Garment Workers' Union.

The building survived the fire and was refurbished. Three plaques on the southeast corner of the building commemorate the women and men, who lost their lives in the fire. In 1916, NYU began to use the eighth floor of the building for a library and classrooms. Real estate speculator and philanthropist Frederick Brown later bought the building and subsequently donated it to the university in 1929, when it was renamed the Brown Building. In 2002, the building was incorporated into the Silver Center for Arts and Science.

== Current use ==
The Brown building is currently owned by New York University. It is internally connected to the adjacent Silver Center and Waverly buildings, and make up the "Main Block" of NYU. It now houses classrooms, study spaces, and many research labs of the NYU Chemistry and Biology Departments.

== See also ==
- List of National Historic Landmarks in New York City
- List of New York City Designated Landmarks in Manhattan below 14th Street
- National Register of Historic Places listings in Manhattan below 14th Street
