= Triangle Shirtwaist Factory fire =

1911 factory fire in New York City

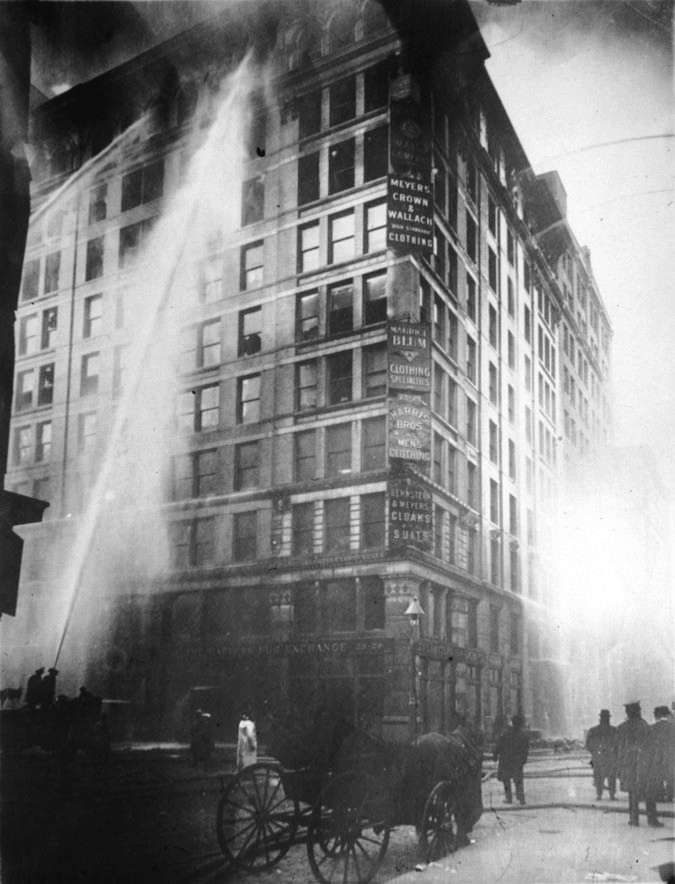
- Date: March 25, 1911; 115 years ago
- Time: 4:40 p.m. (Eastern Time)
- Location: Asch Building, Manhattan, New York, U.S.; 40°43′48″N 73°59′43″W
- Cause: Unknown, possibly a discarded lit match or cigarette
- Deaths: 146
- Injuries: 78

The Triangle Shirtwaist Factory fire occurred in the Greenwich Village neighborhood of Manhattan, a borough of New York City, on Saturday, March 25, 1911. The fire was the deadliest industrial disaster in the history of the city, and one of the deadliest in U.S. history. The fire caused the deaths of 146 garment workers—123 women and girls and 23 men—who died from either the fire, smoke inhalation, or falling or jumping to their deaths. Most of the victims were recent Italian and Jewish immigrants aged 14 to 23.

The factory was located on the 8th, 9th, and 10th floors of the Asch Building (later the Brown Building), which was built in 1901 and remains standing on the New York University (NYU) campus at 23–29 Washington Place, near Washington Square Park. The building has been designated a National Historic Landmark and a New York City landmark.

Because the doors to the stairwells and exits were locked—a common practice at the time to prevent workers from taking unauthorized breaks and to reduce theft—many of the workers could not escape from the burning building and jumped from the high windows. There were no sprinklers in the building. The fire led to legislation requiring improved factory safety standards and helped spur the growth of the International Ladies' Garment Workers' Union (ILGWU), which fought for better working conditions for sweatshop workers.

== Background ==
The Triangle Waist Company factory occupied the 8th, 9th, and 10th floors of the 10-story Asch Building on the northwest corner of Greene Street and Washington Place, just east of Washington Square Park, in the Greenwich Village neighborhood of New York City. Under the ownership of Max Blanck and Isaac Harris, the factory produced women's shirts, known as "shirtwaists". The factory normally employed about 500 workers, mostly young Italian and Jewish immigrant women and girls, who worked nine hours a day on weekdays plus seven hours on Saturdays, earning for their 52 hours of work between $7 and $12 a week, the equivalent of $242 to $415 a week in 2025 currency, or $5.04 to $8.65 per hour. The owners were said to have preferred hiring immigrant women over men because they would work for less and were less likely to unionize against them. Often, these women were poor and young, with little to no education and poor command of English.

== Fire ==
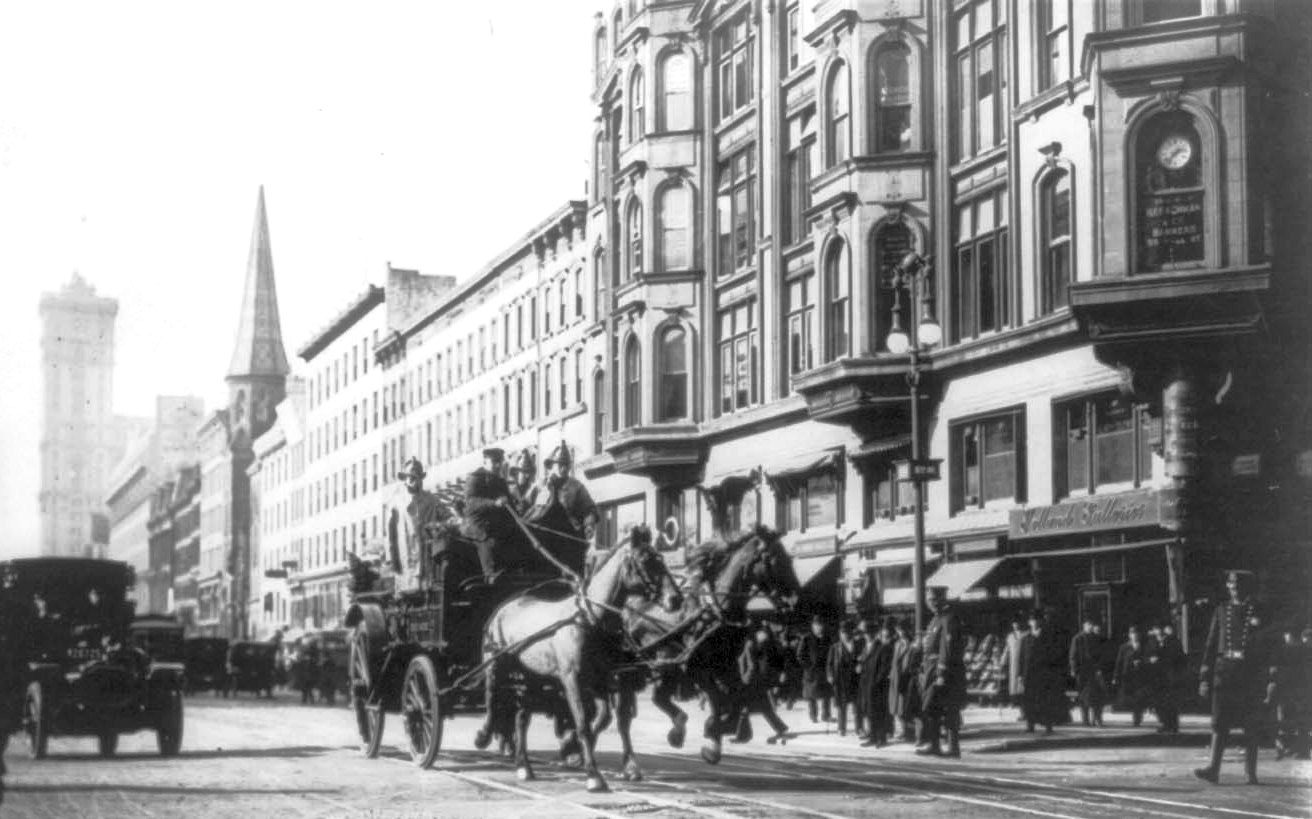
A horse-drawn fire engine on the way to the burning factory

At approximately 4:40 pm on Saturday, March 25, 1911, as the workday was ending, a fire flared up in a scrap bin under one of the cutter's tables at the northeast corner of the 8th floor. The first fire alarm was sent at 4:45 pm; John Gregory, a 24-year-old passerby from East 83rd Street, was the first to spot the blaze from outside, seeing smoke from the upper floor windows as he passed the building. He rushed inside, shouted to an elevator operator that the building was on fire, then jumped into a freight elevator and rode to the tenth floor. Both owners of the factory were in attendance and had invited their children to the factory on that afternoon.

The Fire Marshal concluded that the likely cause of the fire was the disposal of an unextinguished match or cigarette butt in a scrap bin containing two months' worth of accumulated cuttings. Beneath the table in the wooden bin were hundreds of pounds of scraps left over from the several thousand shirtwaists that had been cut at that table. The scraps piled up from the last time the bin was emptied, coupled with the hanging fabrics that surrounded it; the steel trim was the only thing that was not highly flammable.

Although smoking was banned in the factory, cutters were known to sneak cigarettes, exhaling the smoke through their lapels to avoid detection. A New York Times article suggested that the fire had been started by the engines running the sewing machines. A series of articles in Collier's noted a pattern of arson among certain sectors of the garment industry whenever their particular product fell out of fashion or had excess inventory in order to collect insurance. The Insurance Monitor, a leading industry journal, observed that shirtwaists had recently fallen out of fashion, and that insurance for such stock was "fairly saturated with moral hazard". Although Blanck and Harris were known for having had four previous suspicious fire claims, arson was not suspected in this case.

A photograph of the building's south side, which ran the day after the disaster in the March 26, 1911, issue of The New York Times. Windows marked by an X are those from which 50 women jumped.

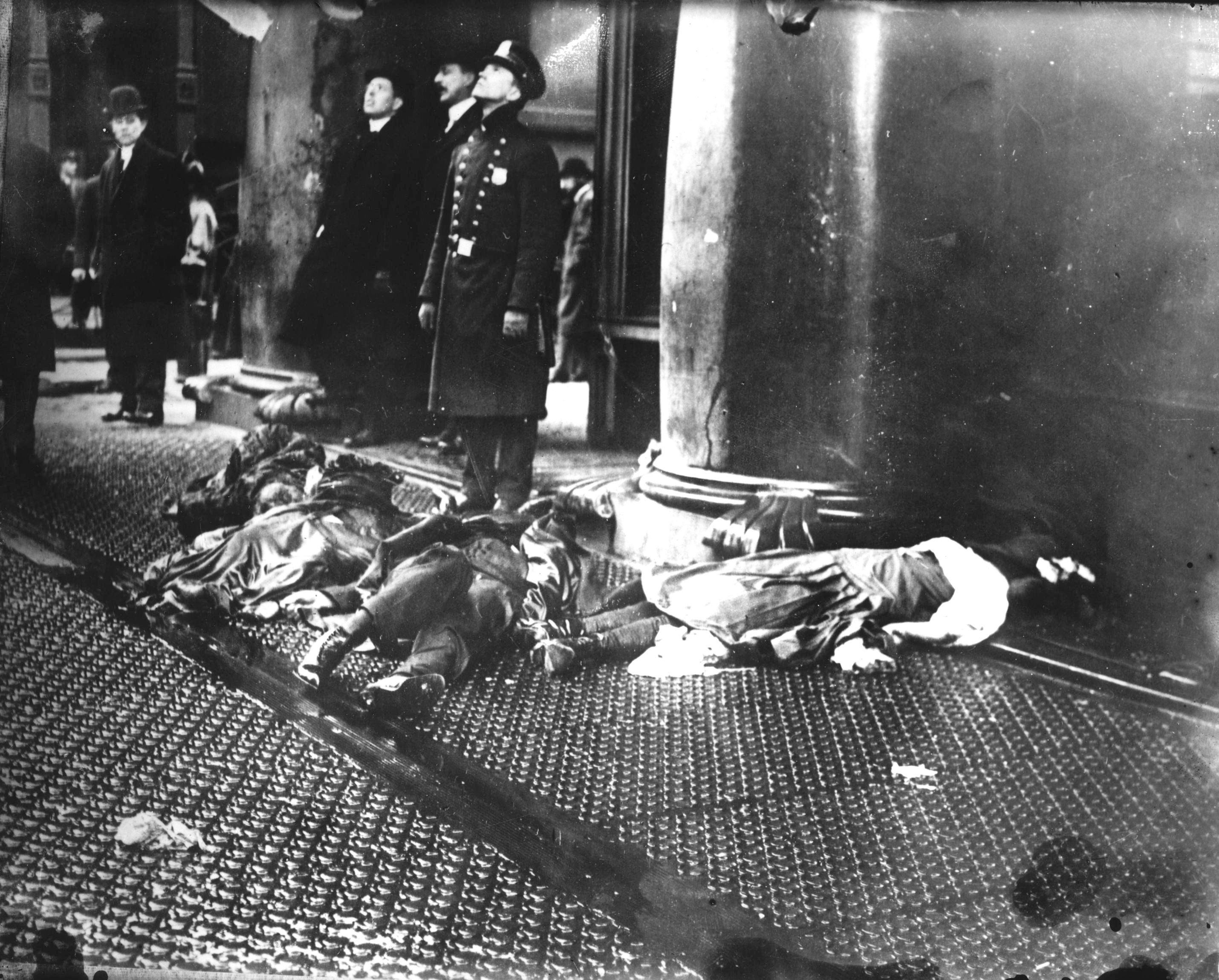
62 people jumped or fell from windows.

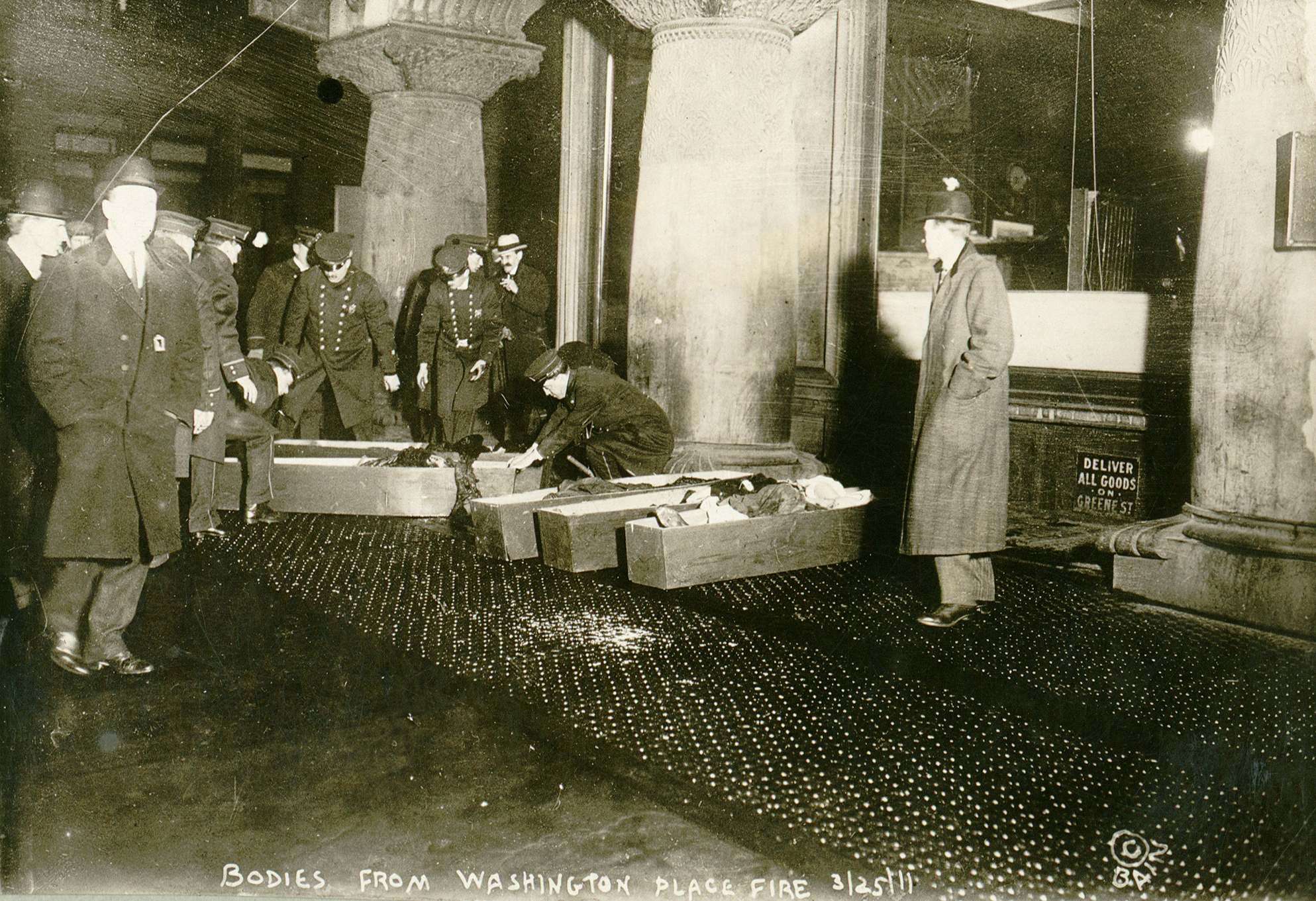
Bodies of victims being placed in coffins on the sidewalk

"The Washington Place Fire"
An eyewitness account

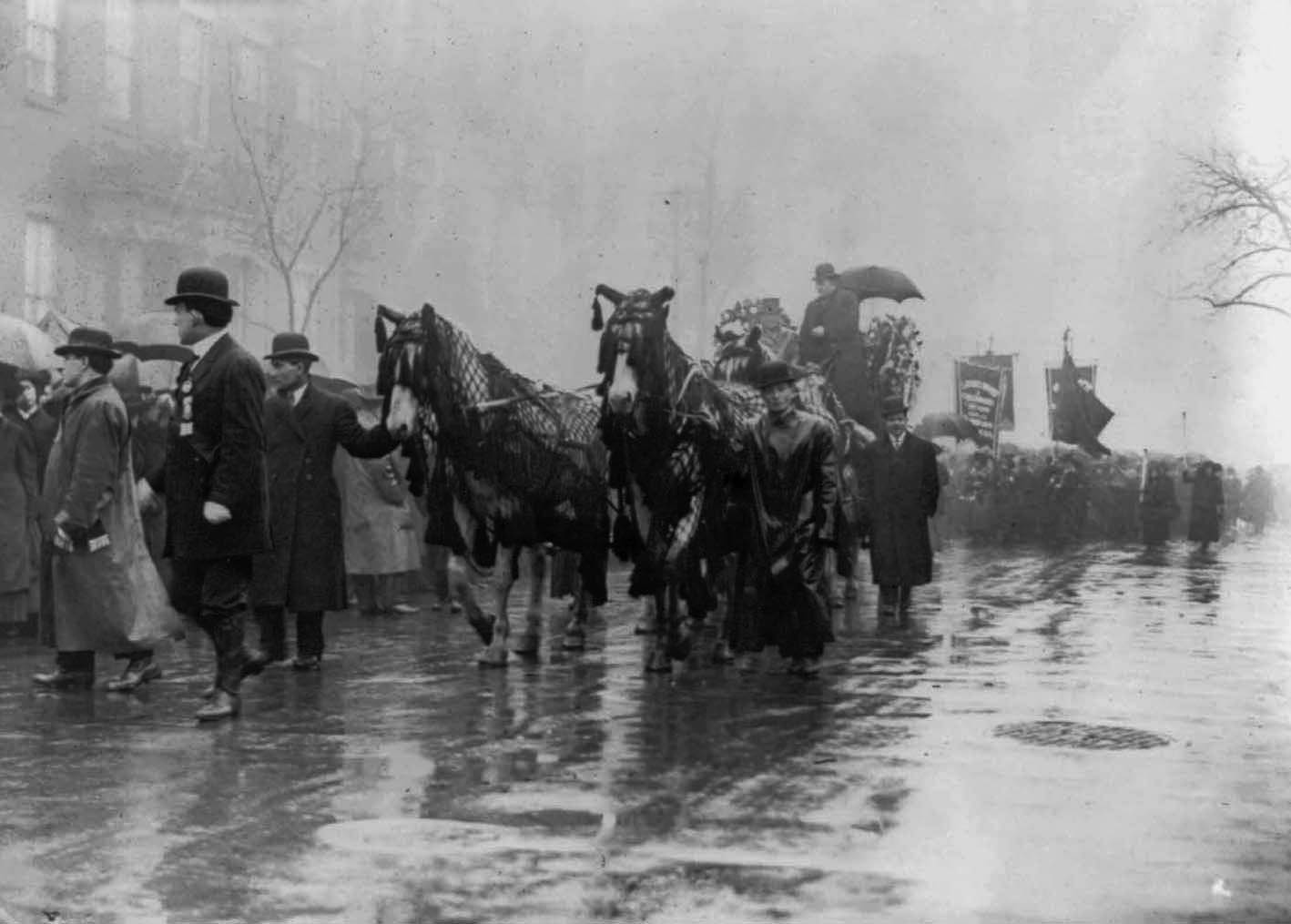
People and horses draped in black walk in procession in memory of the victims

A bookkeeper on the 8th floor was able to warn employees on the 10th floor via telephone, but there was no audible alarm and no way to contact staff on the 9th floor. According to survivor Yetta Lubitz, the first warning of the fire on the 9th floor arrived at the same time as the fire itself.

Although the floor had a number of exits, including two freight elevators, a fire escape, and stairways down to Greene Street and Washington Place, flames prevented workers from descending the Greene Street stairway, and the door to the Washington Place stairway was locked to prevent theft by the workers; the locked doors allowed managers to check the women's purses. Various historians have further ascribed the locked doors to management's wanting to keep out union organizers, for anti-union bias. The foreman who held the stairway door key had already escaped by another route. Dozens of employees escaped the fire by going up the Greene Street stairway to the roof. Other survivors were able to jam themselves into the elevators for as long as they continued to operate.

Within three minutes of the fire starting, the Greene Street stairway became unusable in both directions. Terrified employees crowded onto the single exterior fire escape, which city officials had allowed Asch to erect instead of the required third staircase. The fire escape was a flimsy and poorly anchored iron structure that may have already been broken before the fire. It soon twisted and collapsed from the heat and overload, spilling about 20 victims nearly 100 feet (30 m) to their deaths on the concrete pavement below. The remainder of the victims jumped to their deaths to escape the fire or were eventually overcome by smoke and flames.

The fire department arrived quickly but was unable to stop the flames. Their horse-drawn ladders reached merely as high as the 7th floor. The fallen bodies and jumping victims prevented the approach of fire department staff to the building.

Elevator operators Joseph Zito and Gaspar Mortillaro saved many lives by traveling three times up to the 9th floor for passengers, but Mortillaro was eventually forced to give up when the rails of his elevator buckled under the heat. Some victims pried the elevator doors open and jumped into the empty shaft, trying to slide down the cables or to land on top of the car. The weight and impacts of these bodies warped the elevator car and made it impossible for Zito to make another attempt.

William Gunn Shepherd, a reporter at the tragedy, would say, "I learned a new sound that day, a sound more horrible than description can picture—the thud of a speeding living body on a stone sidewalk." A large crowd of bystanders gathered on the street, witnessing 62 people jumping or falling to their deaths from the burning building. Louis Waldman, later a New York Socialist state assemblyman, described the scene years later:

One Saturday afternoon in March of that year—March 25, to be precise—I was sitting at one of the reading tables in the old Astor Library. ... It was a raw, unpleasant day and the comfortable reading room seemed a delightful place to spend the remaining few hours until the library closed. I was deeply engrossed in my book when I became aware of fire engines racing past the building. By this time I was sufficiently Americanized to be fascinated by the sound of fire engines. Along with several others in the library, I ran out to see what was happening, and followed crowds of people to the scene of the fire.

A few blocks away, the Asch Building at the corner of Washington Place and Greene Street was ablaze. When we arrived at the scene, the police had thrown up a cordon around the area and the firemen were helplessly fighting the blaze. The eighth, ninth, and tenth stories of the building were now an enormous roaring cornice of flames.

Word had spread through the East Side, by some magic of terror, that the plant of the Triangle Waist Company was on fire and that several hundred workers were trapped. Horrified and helpless, the crowds—I among them—looked up at the burning building, saw girl after girl appear at the reddened windows, pause for a terrified moment, and then leap to the pavement below, to land as mangled, bloody pulp. This went on for what seemed a ghastly eternity. Occasionally a girl who had hesitated too long was licked by pursuing flames and, screaming with clothing and hair ablaze, plunged like a living torch to the street. Life nets held by the firemen were torn by the impact of the falling bodies.

The emotions of the crowd were indescribable. Women were hysterical, scores fainted; men wept as, in paroxysms of frenzy, they hurled themselves against the police lines.

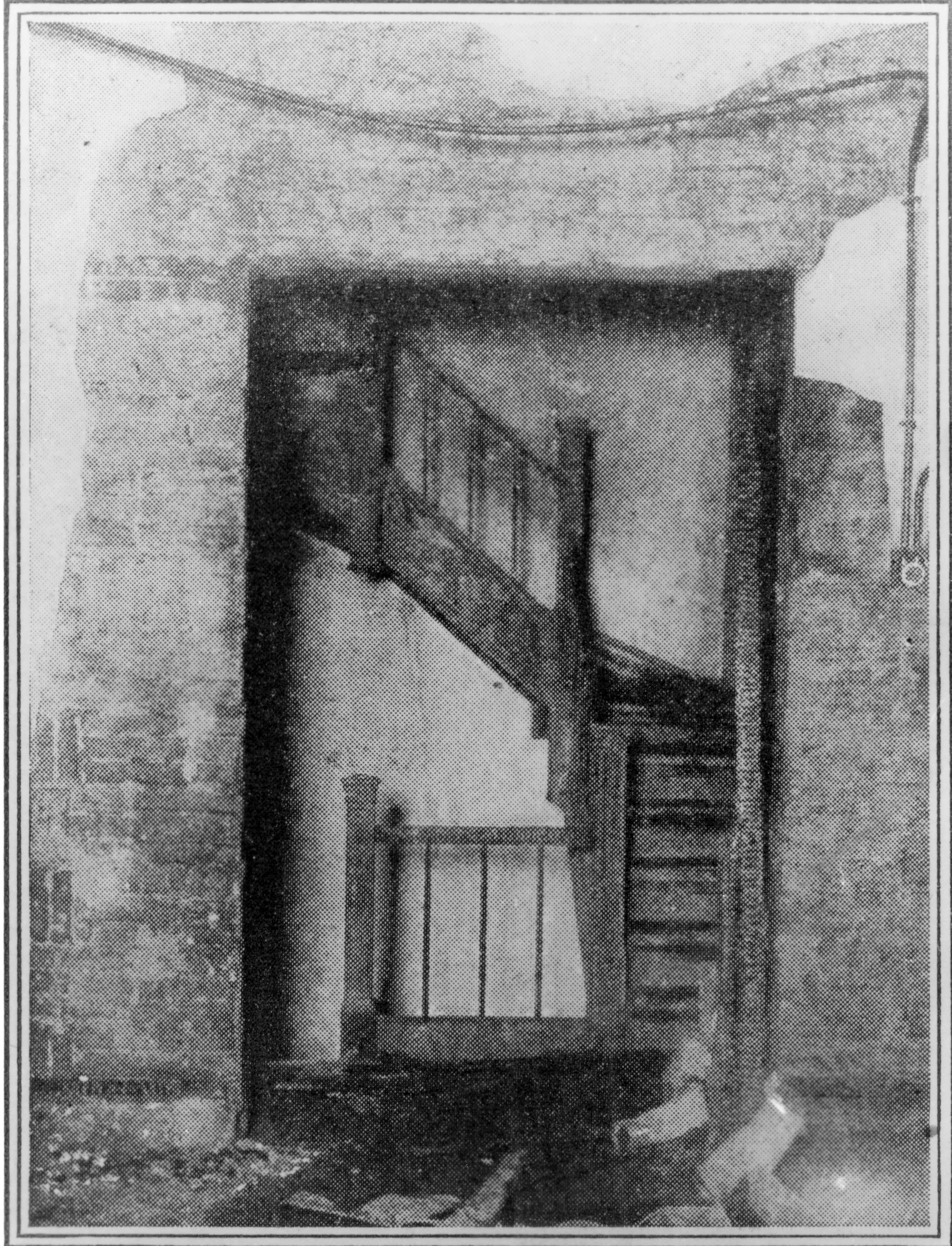
An internal staircase in the Asch building

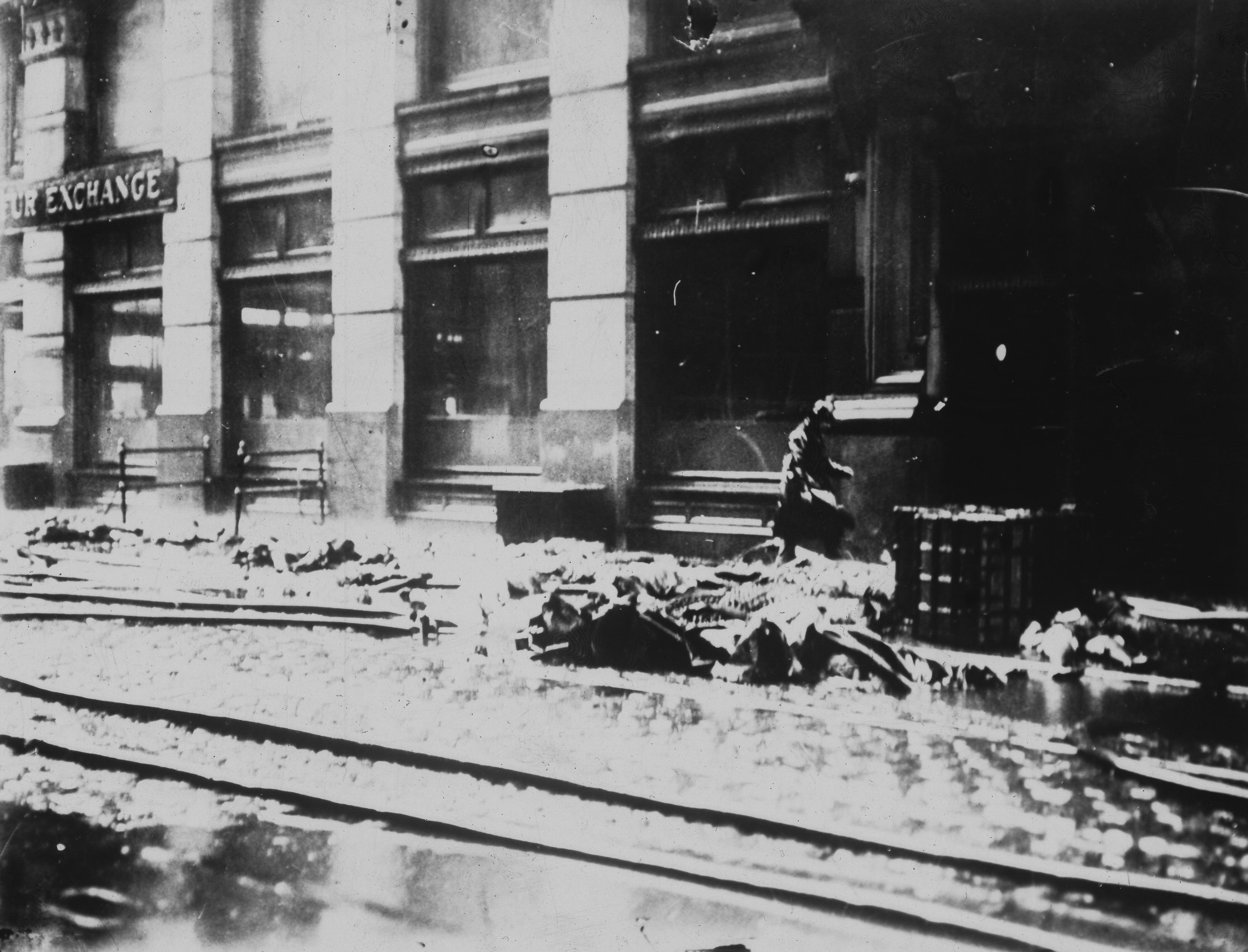
Street in front of the Asch Building

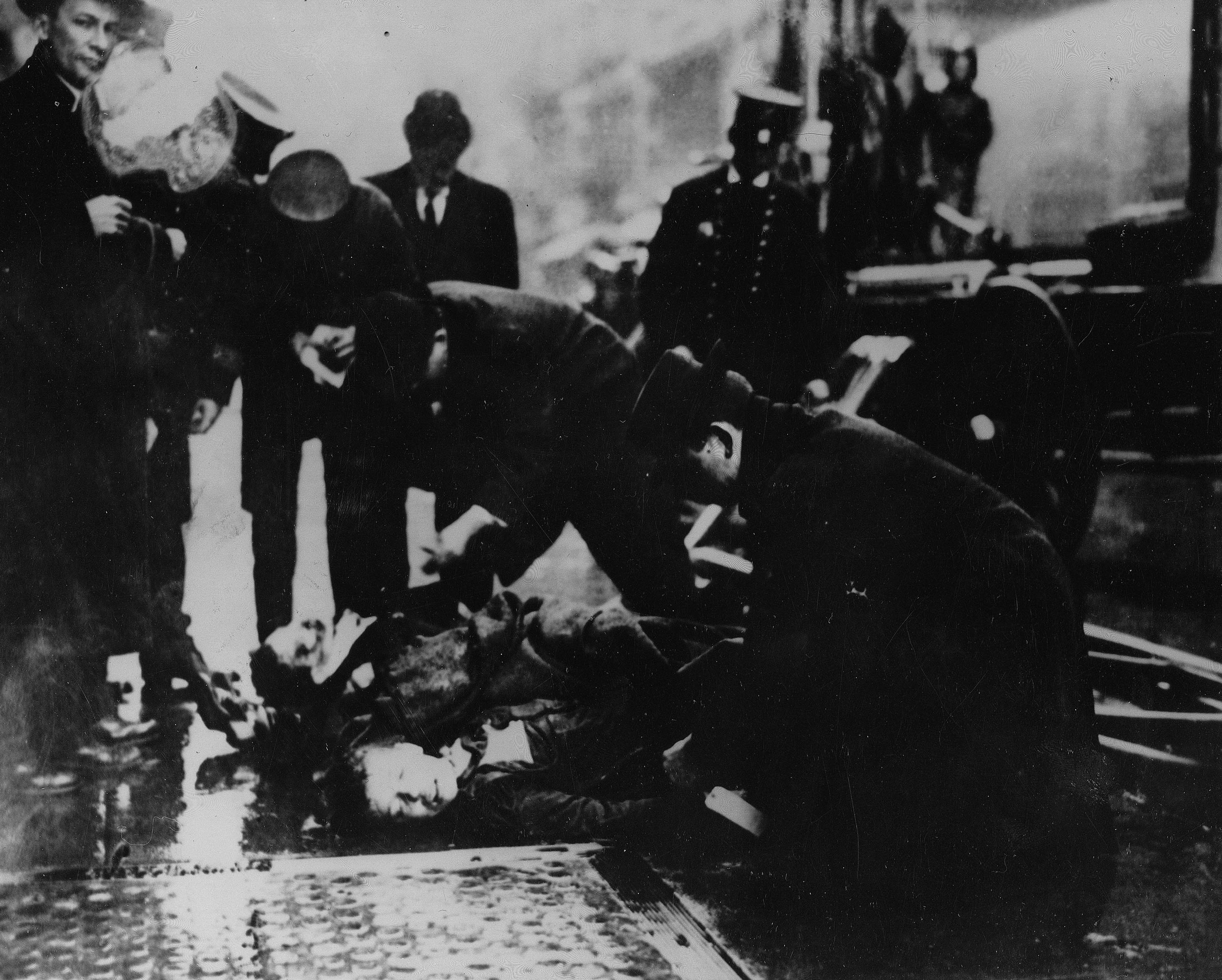
Police officers and fire fighters check for signs of life and collect personal items from victims of the Triangle fire.

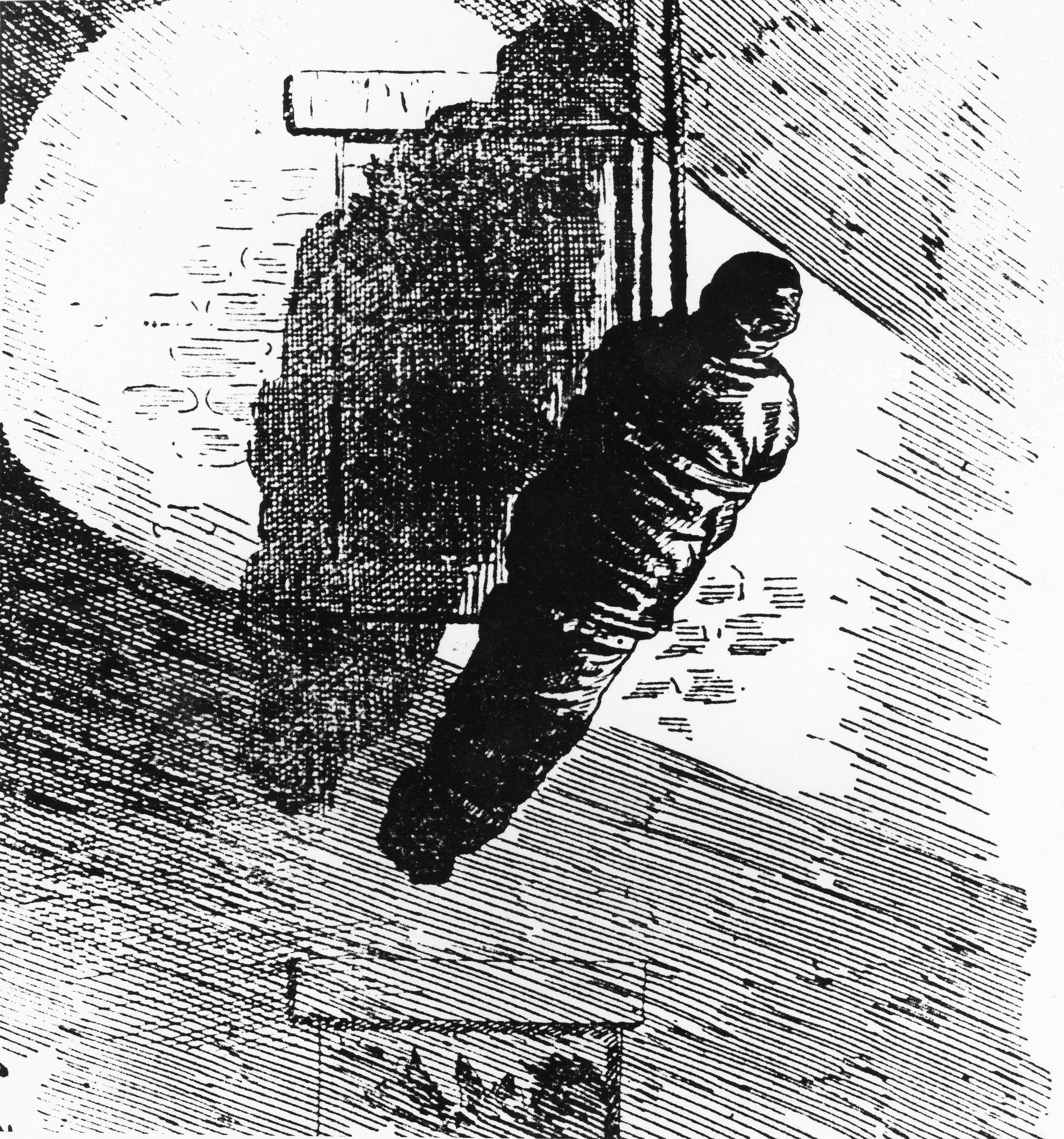
A wrapped corpse being lowered by rope from the Asch Building after the Triangle fire

== Aftermath ==
Contemporary reporting noted that by midnight, 130 of the approximately 700 employees had been taken to the morgue for identification, with bodies still being lowered from the fire-swept upper floors at the rate of one a minute; Coroner Holtzhauer estimated the total death toll would reach 250, while firefighters responding to the first alarm found 30 bodies on the pavements of Washington Place and Greene Street, nearly all of them women and girls. Although early estimates of the death toll ranged from 141 to 148, almost all later references agree that 146 people died as a result of the fire: 123 women and girls and 23 men. Of the victims whose ages are known, the oldest victim was 43-year-old Providenza Panno and the youngest were 14-year-olds Kate Leone and Rosaria "Sara" Maltese. Most victims died of burns, asphyxiation, blunt impact injuries, or a combination of the three.

The first person to jump was a man. Another man was seen kissing a young woman at a window before they both jumped to their deaths. The New York Times described the scene in detail: a 13-year-old girl hung by her fingertips from a 10th floor window sill for three minutes before flames reached her hands; five girls smashed through a window pane together and were crushed on the pavement below; a girl leaping for the fire ladder—which reached only to the 6th floor—struck a life net and was picked up with her back broken. Chief Croker initially estimated 25 dead, then revised the count to 65 based on bodies on the streets and reports from inside, before bodies found on the 9th floor and in the elevator shaft sent the total beyond all previous estimates.

Bodies of victims were taken to Charities Pier (also called Misery Lane), located at 26th Street and the East River, for identification by friends and relatives. Victims were interred in 16 different cemeteries. Twenty-two victims of the fire were buried by the Hebrew Free Burial Association in a special section at Mount Richmond Cemetery. In some instances, their tombstones refer to the fire. Six victims remained unidentified until 2011, when Michael Hirsch, a historian, completed four years of researching newspaper articles and other sources for missing persons and was able to identify each of them by name. Those six victims were buried together in the Cemetery of the Evergreens in Brooklyn. Originally interred elsewhere on the grounds, their remains now lie beneath a monument to the tragedy, a large marble slab featuring a kneeling woman.

== Consequences ==
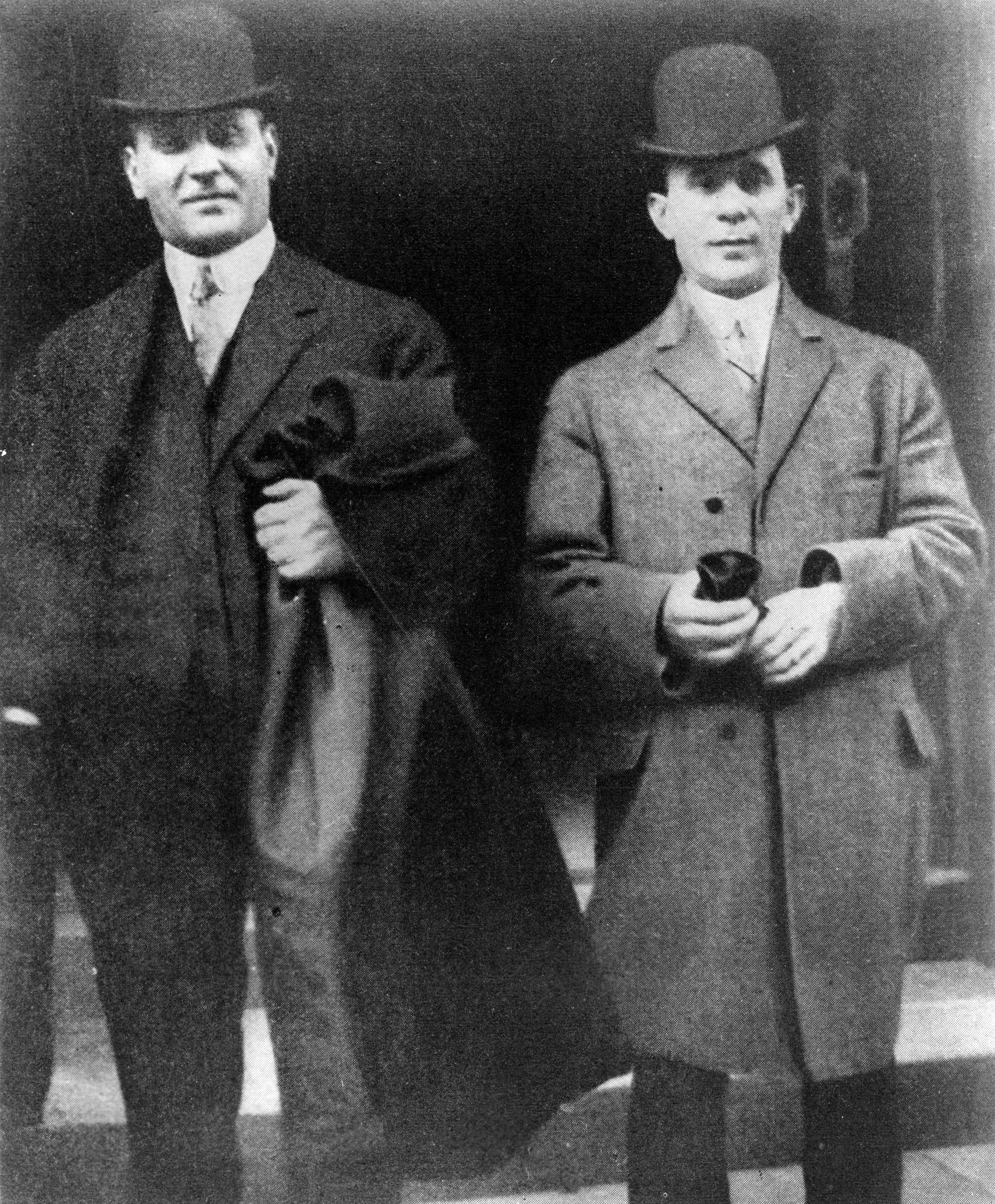
Max Blanck and Isaac Harris, owners of the Triangle Waist Company

The company's owners, Max Blanck and Isaac Harris—both Jewish immigrants—who survived the fire by fleeing to the building's roof when it began, were indicted on charges of first- and second-degree manslaughter in mid-April; the pair's trial began on December 4, 1911. Max Steuer, counsel for the defendants, managed to destroy the credibility of one of the survivors, Kate Alterman, by asking her to repeat her testimony a number of times, which she did without altering key phrases. Steuer argued to the jury that Alterman and possibly other witnesses had memorized their statements and might even have been told what to say by the prosecutors. The prosecution charged that the owners knew that the exit doors were locked at the time in question. The investigation found that the doors were intended to be locked during working hours based on the findings from the fire, but the defense stressed that the prosecution failed to prove that the owners knew that. The jury acquitted the two men of first- and second-degree manslaughter, but they were found liable of wrongful death during a subsequent civil suit in 1913 in which plaintiffs were awarded compensation in the amount of $75 per deceased victim. The insurance company paid Blanck and Harris $64,925 more than the reported losses, or about $445 per casualty.

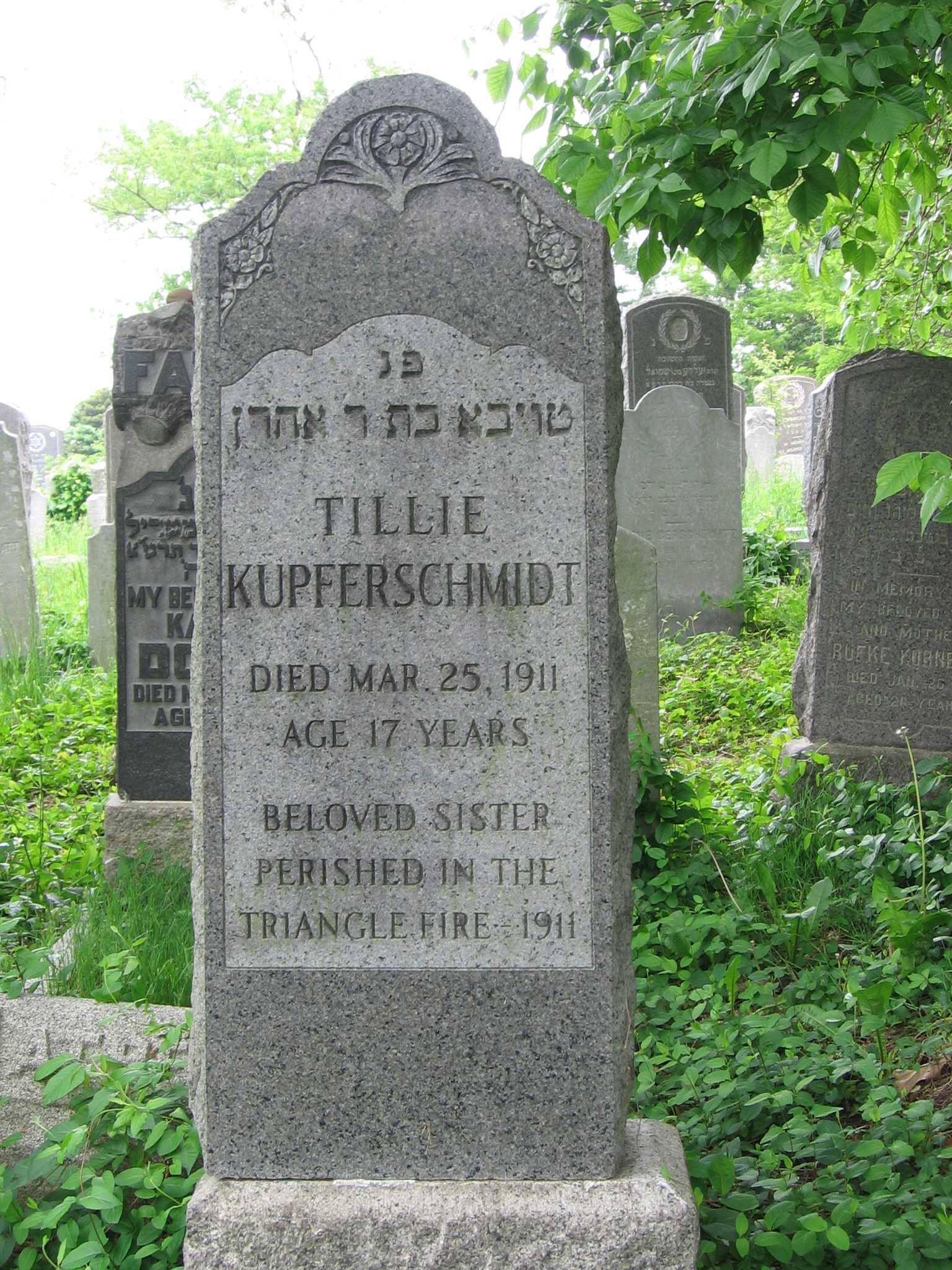
Tombstone of fire victim Tillie Kupferschmidt at the Hebrew Free Burial Association's Mount Richmond Cemetery

Rose Schneiderman, a prominent socialist and union activist, gave a speech at the memorial meeting held in the Metropolitan Opera House on April 2, 1911, to an audience largely made up of members of the Women's Trade Union League. She used the fire as an argument for factory workers to organize:

I would be a traitor to these poor burned bodies if I came here to talk good fellowship. We have tried you good people of the public and we have found you wanting... We have tried you citizens; we are trying you now, and you have a couple of dollars for the sorrowing mothers, brothers, and sisters by way of a charity gift. But every time the workers come out in the only way they know to protest against conditions which are unbearable, the strong hand of the law is allowed to press down heavily upon us.

Public officials have only words of warning to us—warning that we must be intensely peaceable, and they have the workhouse just back of all their warnings. The strong hand of the law beats us back, when we rise, into the conditions that make life unbearable.

I can't talk fellowship to you who are gathered here. Too much blood has been spilled. I know from my experience it is up to the working people to save themselves. The only way they can save themselves is by a strong working-class movement.

Others in the community, and in particular in the ILGWU, believed that political reform could help. In New York City, a Committee on Public Safety was formed, headed by eyewitness Frances Perkins—who 22 years later would be appointed United States Secretary of Labor—to identify specific problems and lobby for new legislation, such as the bill to grant workers shorter hours in a work week, known as the "54-hour Bill". The committee's representatives in Albany obtained the backing of Tammany Hall's Al Smith, the Majority Leader of the Assembly, and Robert F. Wagner, the Majority Leader of the Senate, and this collaboration of machine politicians and reformers—also known as "do-gooders" or "goo-goos"—got results, especially since Tammany's chief, Charles F. Murphy, realized the goodwill to be had as champion of the downtrodden.

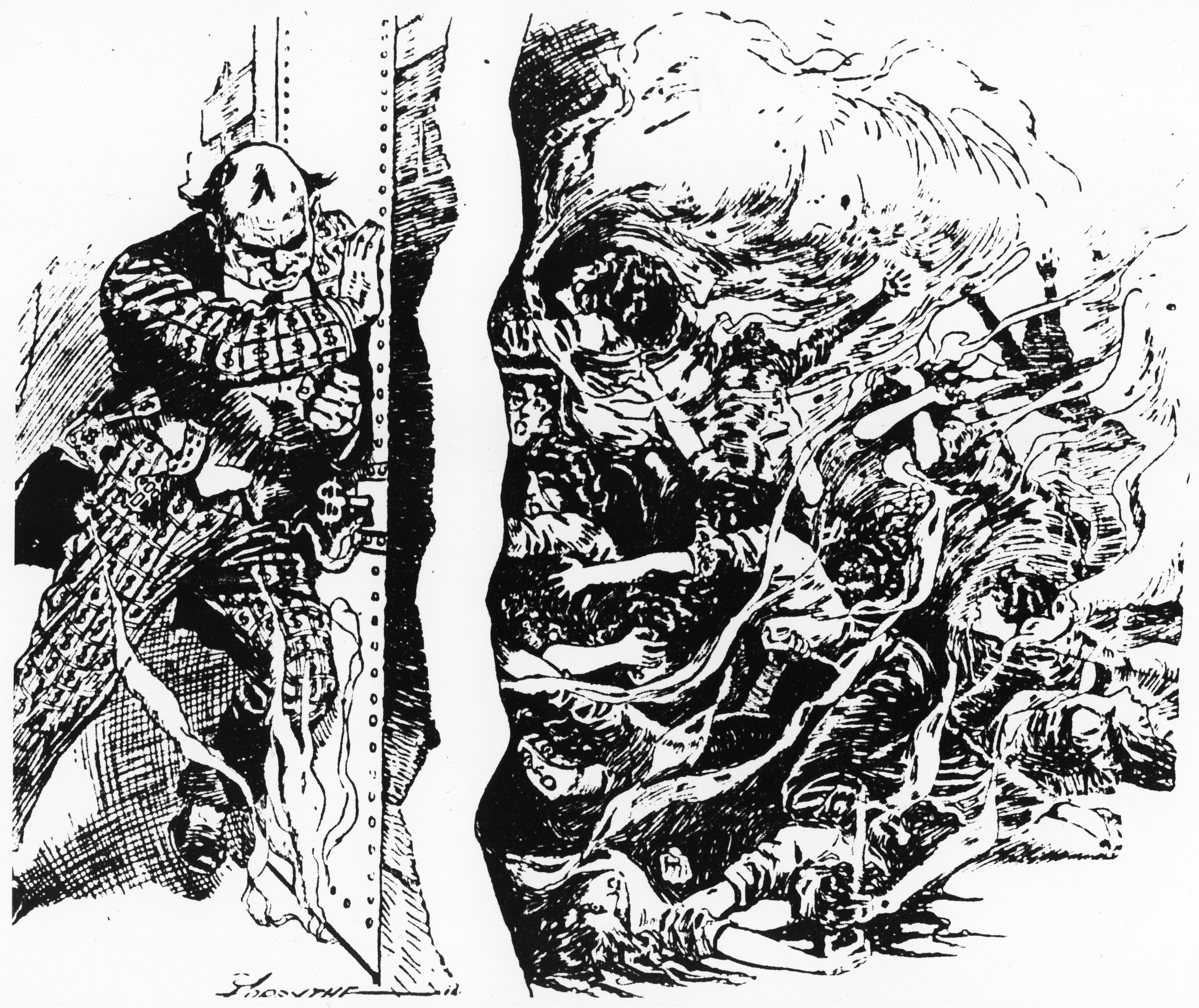
A 1911 cartoon referring to the Triangle fire depicts a factory owner, his coat bedecked with dollar signs, holding a door closed while workers shut inside struggle to escape amid flames and smoke.

The New York State Legislature then created the Factory Investigating Commission to "investigate factory conditions in this and other cities and to report remedial measures of legislation to prevent hazard or loss of life among employees through fire, unsanitary conditions, and occupational diseases." The Commission was chaired by Wagner and co-chaired by Al Smith. They held a series of widely publicized investigations around the state, interviewing 222 witnesses and taking 3,500 pages of testimony. They hired field agents to do on-site inspections of factories. They started with the issue of fire safety and moved on to broader issues of the risks of injury in the factory environment. Their findings led to thirty-eight new laws regulating labor in New York state, and gave them a reputation as leading progressive reformers working on behalf of the working class. In the process, they changed Tammany's reputation from mere corruption to progressive endeavors to help the workers. New York City's Fire Chief John Kenlon told the investigators that his department had identified more than 200 factories where conditions made a fire like that at the Triangle Factory possible. The State Commissions's reports helped modernize the state's labor laws, making New York State "one of the most progressive states in terms of labor reform." New laws mandated better building access and egress, fireproofing requirements, the availability of fire extinguishers, the installation of alarm systems and automatic sprinklers, and better eating and toilet facilities for workers, and limited the number of hours that women and children could work. From 1911 to 1913, 60 of the 64 new laws recommended by the Commission were legislated with the support of Governor William Sulzer.

As a result of the fire, the American Society of Safety Professionals was founded in New York City on October 14, 1911.

In response to the growing human toll of industrial disasters, the Association of Iron and Steel Electrical Engineers called for a national industrial safety conference. In 1912, the first Cooperative Safety Congress took place, sponsored by the Association of Iron and Steel Electrical Engineers, where attendees resolved to "organize and create a permanent body for the promotion of the safety to human life in the industries of the United States." In 1913, at the Second Safety Congress in New York City, the National Council for Industrial Safety was established, known today as the National Safety Council.

Harris and Blanck, after their acquittal, worked to rebuild their business, opening a factory at 16th Street and Fifth Avenue. In the summer of 1913, Blanck was once again arrested for locking the door in the factory during working hours. He was fined $20, which was the minimum amount the fine could be.

In 1918, the two partners closed the Triangle Waist Company and went their separate ways. Harris resumed working as a tailor, while Blanck set up other companies with his brothers, the most prominent of which was Normandy Waist Company, which earned a modest profit.

== Legacy ==
The last living survivor of the fire was Rose Freedman, née Rosenfeld, who died in Beverly Hills, California, on February 15, 2001, at the age of 107. She was two days away from her 18th birthday at the time of the fire, which she survived by following the company's executives and being rescued from the roof of the building. As a result of her experience, she became a lifelong supporter of unions.

On September 16, 2019, U.S. Senator Elizabeth Warren delivered a speech in Washington Square Park supporting her presidential campaign, a few blocks from the location of the Triangle Shirtwaist Factory fire. Sen. Warren recounted the story of the fire and its legacy before a crowd of supporters, likening activism for workers' rights after the 1911 fire to her own presidential platform.

== Remember the Triangle Fire Coalition ==
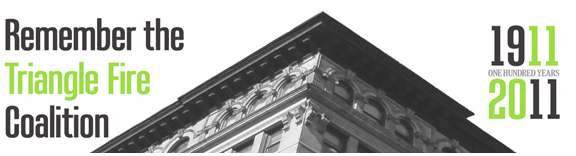
Logo

The Remember the Triangle Fire Coalition is an alliance of more than 200 organizations and individuals formed in 2008 to encourage and coordinate nationwide activities commemorating the centennial of the fire and to create a permanent public art memorial to honor its victims. The founding partners included Workers United, the New York City Fire Museum, New York University (the current owner of the building), Workmen's Circle, Museum at Eldridge Street, the Greenwich Village Society for Historic Preservation, the Lower East Side Tenement Museum, the Gotham Center for New York City History, the Bowery Poetry Club and others. Members of the Coalition include arts organizations, schools, workers’ rights groups, labor unions, human rights and women's rights groups, ethnic organizations, historical preservation societies, activists, and scholars, as well as families of the victims and survivors.

The Coalition grew out of a public art project called Chalk, created by New York City filmmaker Ruth Sergel. Every year beginning in 2004, Sergel and volunteer artists went across New York City on the anniversary of the fire to inscribe in chalk the names, ages, and causes of death of the victims in front of their former homes, often including drawings of flowers, tombstones, or a triangle.

=== Centennial ===
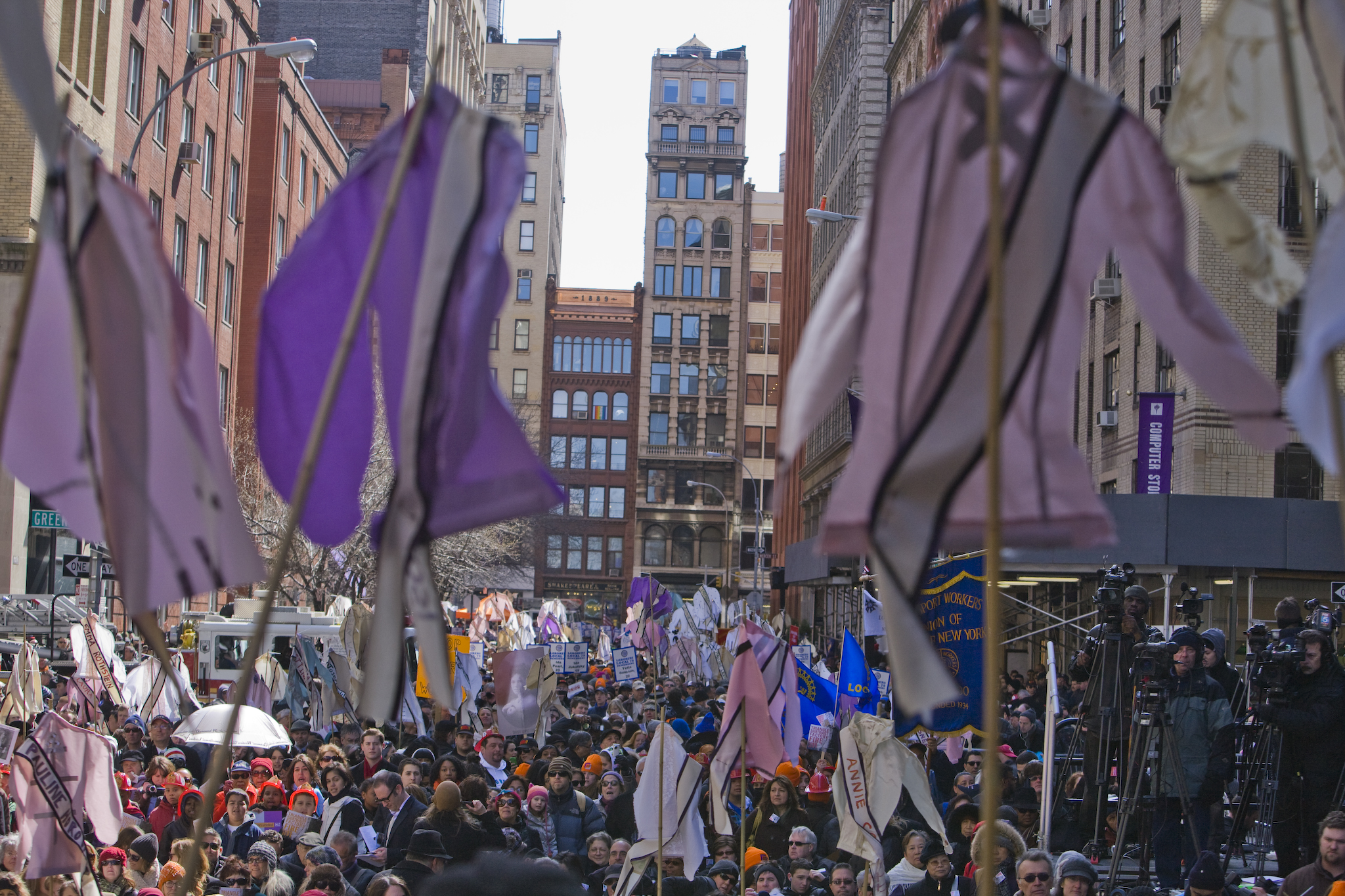
The commemoration drew thousands of people, many holding aloft "146 Shirtwaist-Kites" conceived by artist Annie Lanzillotto and designed and fabricated by members of the Remember the Triangle Fire Coalition, with the names of the victims on sashes, as they listened to speakers.

From July 2009 to the weeks leading up to the 100th anniversary, the Coalition served as a clearinghouse to organize some 200 activities as varied as academic conferences, films, theater performances, art shows, concerts, readings, awareness campaigns, walking tours, and parades that were held in and around New York City and in other cities across the nation, including San Francisco, Los Angeles, Chicago, Minneapolis, Boston, and Washington, D.C.

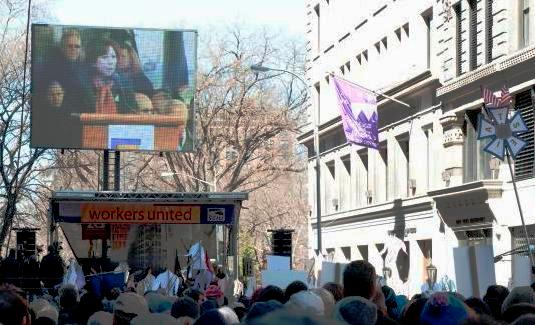
Hilda Solis, the American Secretary of Labor, seen on an overhead screen, speaking at the Centennial Memorial. The Brown (Asch) Building is on the far right.

The ceremony, which was held in front of the building where the fire took place, was preceded by a march through Greenwich Village by thousands of people, some carrying shirtwaists—women's blouses—on poles, with sashes commemorating the names of those who died in the fire. Speakers included the United States Secretary of Labor, Hilda L. Solis, U.S. Senator Charles Schumer, New York City Mayor Michael R. Bloomberg, the actor Danny Glover, and Suzanne Pred Bass, the grandniece of Rosie Weiner, a young woman killed in the blaze. Most of the speakers that day called for the strengthening of workers’ rights and organized labor.

At 4:45 pm EST, the moment the first fire alarm was sounded in 1911, hundreds of bells rang out in cities and towns across the nation. For this commemorative act, the Remember the Triangle Fire Coalition organized hundreds of churches, schools, fire houses, and private individuals in the New York City region and across the nation. On its website, the Coalition maintains a national map denoting each of the bells that rang that afternoon.

=== Memorial in Manhattan ===
The Coalition launched a successful effort to create a permanent public art memorial for the Triangle Shirtwaist Factory fire at the site of the 1911 fire in lower Manhattan.

In 2011, the Coalition established that the goals of the permanent memorial would be

- to honor the memory of those who died from the fire;
- to affirm the dignity of all workers;
- to value women's work;
- to remember the movement for worker safety and social justice stirred by this tragedy; and
- to inspire future generations of activists.

In 2012, the Coalition signed an agreement with NYU that granted the organization permission to install a memorial on the Brown Building and, in consultation with the Landmarks Preservation Commission, indicated what elements of the building could be incorporated into the design. Architectural designer Ernesto Martinez directed an international competition for the design. A jury of representatives from fashion, public art, design, architecture, and labor history reviewed 170 entries from more than 30 countries and selected a spare yet powerful design by Richard Joon Yoo and Uri Wegman. On December 22, 2015, New York Governor Andrew Cuomo announced that $1.5 million from state economic development funds would be earmarked to build the Triangle Fire Memorial.

The memorial includes a steel ribbon descending from the building, before splitting into two horizontal ribbons, twelve feet above street level, on the corner of the building. The ribbons are meant to evoke mourning ribbons, which were traditionally draped on building facades by communities in mourning. The horizontal ribbons list the names and ages of all 146 victims, with the letters and numbers formed as holes in the steel. For married women, both their birth names and married names are included, in part to highlight the family connections between victims.

Under the ribbon is a reflective panel, allowing visitors to see the sky through the letters and numbers on the ribbon. The reflective panel also contains quotes from eyewitnesses about the event, in English, Italian, and Yiddish, reflecting the backgrounds of the victims. Another panel includes a description of the event and its impact, also written in English, Italian, and Yiddish.

The memorial was officially unveiled on October 11, 2023, more than a century after the fire occurred.

An additional vertical steel ribbon was installed in June 2024; it extends up the side of the building, dividing into two at the third floor, and eventually reaching the ninth floor, where many of the workers were trapped and from which many jumped.

== Mt. Zion Cemetery Memorial ==
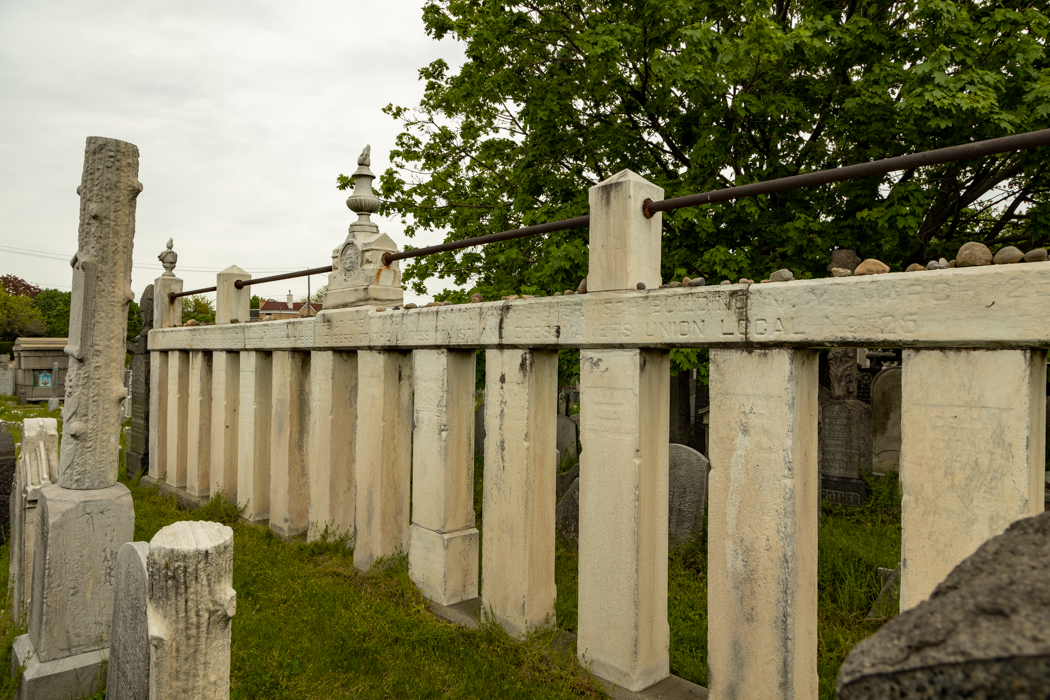
Triangle Shirtwaist Factory Memorial, Mount Zion Cemetery, Maspeth, Queens

A memorial "of the Ladies Waist and Dress Makers Union Local No 25" was erected in Mt. Zion Cemetery in Maspeth, Queens (40°44'2" N 73°54'11" W). It is a series of stone columns holding a large cross beam. Much of the writing is no longer legible due to erosion.

== Plaques ==
Three plaques on the southeast corner of the Brown Building commemorate the women and men who lost their lives in the fire.

== In popular culture ==
Films and television

- The Crime of Carelessness (1912), 14-minute Thomas A. Edison, Inc. short inspired by the Triangle Factory fire, directed by James Oppenheim
- With These Hands (1950), directed by Jack Arnold
- The Triangle Factory Fire Scandal (1979), directed by Mel Stuart, produced by Mel Brez and Ethel Brez
- American Pop (1981), an adult animated musical drama film written by Ronni Kern and directed by Ralph Bakshi features a scene where one character's mother is killed in the fire.
- Those Who Know Don't Tell: The Ongoing Battle for Workers' Health (1990), produced by Abby Ginzberg, narrated by Studs Terkel
- Episode 4 of Ric Burns' 1999 PBS series New York: A Documentary Film, "The Power and the People (1898–1918)", extensively covered the fire.
- The Living Century: Three Miracles (2001) premiered on PBS, focusing on the life of 107-year-old Rose Freedman (died 2001), who became the last living survivor of the fire.
- American Experience: Triangle Fire (2011), documentary produced and directed by Jamila Wignot, narrated by Michael Murphy
- Triangle: Remembering the Fire (2011) premiered on HBO on March 21, four days short of the 100th anniversary.
- In season 3 episode 7 of SyFy Channel TV show Warehouse 13 (2011), characters Claudia Donovan and Steve Jinks recover an artifact from the Triangle Shirtwaist Factory Fire, a doorknob which burns people.
- The Fire of a Movement (2019) Episode of PBS series The Future of America's Past: "We visit the building and learn how public outcry inspired workplace safety laws that revolutionized industrial work nationwide. Descendants and activists show us how that work reverberates today."

Music

- "Die Fire Korbunes" (The Fire Victims), music by David Meyerowitz, 1911
- "Dos lid fun nokh dem fayer" ("The Song from after the Fire") by Yiddish lyricist Charles Simon, 1912.
- "My Little Shirtwaist Fire" by Rasputina, from their 1996 album Thanks for the Ether.
- "The Triangle Fire" by The Brandos, from their 2006 album Over the Border.
- "Sweatshop Fire" by Curtis Eller, from his 2008 album Wirewalkers and Assassins.
- "Washington Square", by Si Kahn, from his 2010 album Courage
- Fire in my mouth (2018), a 60-minute oratorio for 146 female voices and orchestra by Julia Wolfe premiered by The Crossing (choral ensemble), The Young People's Chorus of New York City, and The New York Philharmonic under the direction of Jaap van Zweden at David Geffen Hall, Lincoln Center on January 24, 2019.

Theatre and dance

- Naomi Wallace's 1996 play Slaughter City includes a character, the Textile Worker, that was killed in the Triangle Shirtwaist Fire, and the play itself was inspired by several labor events throughout the 20th century, including the fire.
- In Ain Gordon's play Birdseed Bundles (2000), the Triangle Fire is a major dramatic engine of the story.
- The musical Rags – book by Joseph Stein, lyrics by Stephen Schwartz, and music by Charles Strouse – incorporates the Triangle Shirtwaist fire in the second act.

Literature

- "Mayn Rue Platz" (My Resting Place), a poem written by former Triangle employee Morris Rosenfeld, has been set to music, in Yiddish and English, by many artists, including Geoff Berner and June Tabor.
- Sholem Asch's 1946 novel East River (ISBN 978-1-4326-1999-2) tells the story of the Triangle Shirtwaist Factory fire through the eyes of an Irish girl who was working at the factory at a time of the fire.
- The Triangle Fire by Leon Stein, 1963 (ISBN 978-0-8014-7707-2)
- Fragments from the Fire: The Triangle Shirtwaist Company Fire of March 25, 1911, a book of poetry by Chris Llewellyn, 1987 (ISBN 978-0-14-058586-5).
- Triangle: The Fire That Changed America by David Von Drehle, 2003 (ISBN 978-0-8021-4151-4)
- Deborah Hopkinson's 2004 historical novel for young adults, Hear My Sorrow: The Diary of Angela Denoto (ISBN 978-0-439-22161-0).
- Mary Jane Auch's 2004 historical novel for young adults, Ashes of Roses (ISBN 978-0-312-53580-3) tells the tale of Margaret Rose Nolan, a young girl who works at the Triangle Shirtwaist Factory at the time of the fire, along with her sister and her friends.
- Triangle, a 2006 novel by Katharine Weber (ISBN 978-0-374-28142-7), tells the story of the last living survivor of the fire, whose story hides the truth of her experience on March 25, 1911, raising the questions of who owns history and whose stories prevail.
- Margaret Peterson Haddix's 2007 historical novel for young adults, Uprising (ISBN 978-1-4169-1171-5), deals with immigration, women's rights, and the labor movement, with the Triangle Shirtwaist Fire as a central element.
- "Heaven Is Full of Windows", a 2009 short story by Steve Stern, dramatizes the Triangle Shirtwaist Factory fire from the perspective of a Polish Jewish immigrant girl.
- "Afterlife", a 2013 short story by Stephen King, centers around Isaac Harris in Purgatory talking about the fire.
- Helene Wecker's 2021 novel The Hidden Palace (ISBN 978-0-06-246874-1) is a historical fantasy that centers around a golem and a jinni living in New York in the early 20th century. The Triangle Shirtwaist Factory fire occurs as an event that affects multiple characters in the novel.
- Talking to the Girls: Intimate and Political Essays on the Triangle Shirtwaist Factory Fire edited by Edvige Giunta and Mary Anne Trasciatti, 2022 (ISBN 978-1-61332-150-8).
- Esther Friesner's Threads and Flames (ISBN 978-0-670-01245-9) deals with a young girl, named Raisa, who works at the Triangle Shirtwaist Factory at the time of the fire.
- The comic book The Goon issue No. 37 tells the story of a similar fire at a girdle factory that takes the lives of 142 women who worked there. After the fire, the surviving women attempt to unionize and the Goon comes to their aid after union busters try to force them back to work. Author Eric Powell specifically cites the Triangle Shirtwaist Factory fire as an inspiration for the story.
- Vivian Schurfranz's novel Rachel (ISBN 978-0-590-40394-8), from the Sunfire series of historical romances for young adults, is about a Polish Jewish immigrant girl who works at the Triangle Shirtwaist Factory at the time of the fire.
- Robert Pinsky's poem "Shirt" describes the fire.
- In Alice Hoffman's novel The Museum of Extraordinary Things (ISBN 978-1-4516-9357-7), the fire is one of the main elements of the plot.
- In a section of Edward Rutherfurd's novel New York (ISBN 978-0-385-52138-3), a protagonist's sister, from an Italian immigrant family, dies after jumping from a window to escape the fire.
- Alix E. Harrow's novel The Once and Future Witches (ISBN 978-0-356-51247-1) set in industrial-era America, describes a fire at the "Square Shirtwaist Factory" that kills dozens of workers who are locked in and more who jump to their deaths.
- Susan Meissner's novel A Fall of Marigolds is a dual-timeline novel comparing the fire to 9/11. (ISBN 978-0451419910)

== See also ==
- 2012 Dhaka garment factory fire, a similar fire in Bangladesh
- 2012 Pakistan garment factory fires
- 2013 Rana Plaza collapse, the deadliest garment factory disaster in history, in Dhaka
- International Women's Day
- List of disasters in New York City by death toll
- List of fires
- Occupational Safety and Health Administration
- Rhinelander Waldo, NYC Fire Commissioner in 1911
- Women in labor unions
- Rose Schneiderman, the labor organizer who organized much of the union response that followed.
