= Edward Gilligan =

Edward Gilligan may refer to:

- Edward P. Gilligan (1959–2015), vice chairman and president of American Express
- Edward L. Gilligan (1843–1922), American soldier in the American Civil War
