= New York University =

Private university in New York City, New York

- Former name: University of the City of New-York (1831–1896)
- Motto: Perstare et praestare (Latin)
- Motto in English: "To persevere and to excel"
- Type: Private research university
- Established: April 21, 1831; 195 years ago
- Founder: Albert Gallatin
- Accreditation: MSCHE
- Academic affiliations: AAU; AITU; NAICU; space-grant
- Endowment: $7.28 billion (2025)
- Budget: $18.8 billion (including Langone); $4.3 billion (excluding Langone) (2025)
- President: Linda G. Mills
- Provost: Georgina Dopico
- Faculty: 5,094 (fall 2023)
- Administrative staff: 2,242
- Students: 61,890 (fall 2023)
- Undergraduates: 29,760 (fall 2023)
- Postgraduates: 27,578 (fall 2023)
- Location: New York City, United States; 40°43′48″N 73°59′42″W
- Campus: 230 acres (93 ha) (Manhattan campus); Large city
- Other campuses: Brooklyn; Englewood Cliffs; Los Angeles; Mineola; Washington; Abu Dhabi; Accra; Berlin; Buenos Aires; Florence; Havana; London; Madrid; Paris; Prague; Shanghai; Sydney; Tel Aviv; Tulsa
- Newspaper: Washington Square News
- Colors: Violet and white
- Nickname: Violets
- Sporting affiliations: NCAA Division III – UAA
- Mascot: Bobcat
- Website: nyu.edu

New York University (NYU) is a private research university in New York City, United States. Chartered in 1831 by the New York State Legislature, NYU was founded in 1832 by Albert Gallatin as a non-sectarian all-male institution near City Hall based on a curriculum focused on a secular education. The university moved in 1833 and has maintained its main campus in Greenwich Village surrounding Washington Square Park. Since then, the university has added an engineering school in Brooklyn's MetroTech Center and graduate schools throughout Manhattan. NYU is one of the largest private universities in the United States by enrollment, with a total of 61,890 enrolled students in 2023, and is one of the nation's most heavily applied–to universities with over 120,000 applications each year.

NYU's main campus in New York City is organized into undergraduate schools in the fields of arts and science, business, education, engineering, individualized study, and the arts. NYU's graduate schools cover the fields of business, law, medicine, nursing, professional studies, public service, and social work. The university's internal academic centers include the Courant Institute of Mathematical Sciences, Center for Data Science, Center for Neural Science, Clive Davis Institute, Institute for the Study of the Ancient World, Institute of Fine Arts, and the NYU Langone Health System.

NYU is a global university system with degree-granting portal campuses at NYU Abu Dhabi in the United Arab Emirates and NYU Shanghai in China, and academic centers in Accra, Berlin, Buenos Aires, Florence, London, Los Angeles, Madrid, Paris, Prague, Sydney, Tel Aviv, Tulsa, and Washington, D.C. Past and present faculty and alumni include 39 Nobel laureates, 8 Turing Award winners, 5 Fields Medalists, 31 MacArthur Fellows, 26 Pulitzer Prize winners, 3 heads of state, 5 U.S. governors, 12 U.S. senators, and 58 members of the U.S. House of Representatives.

== History ==
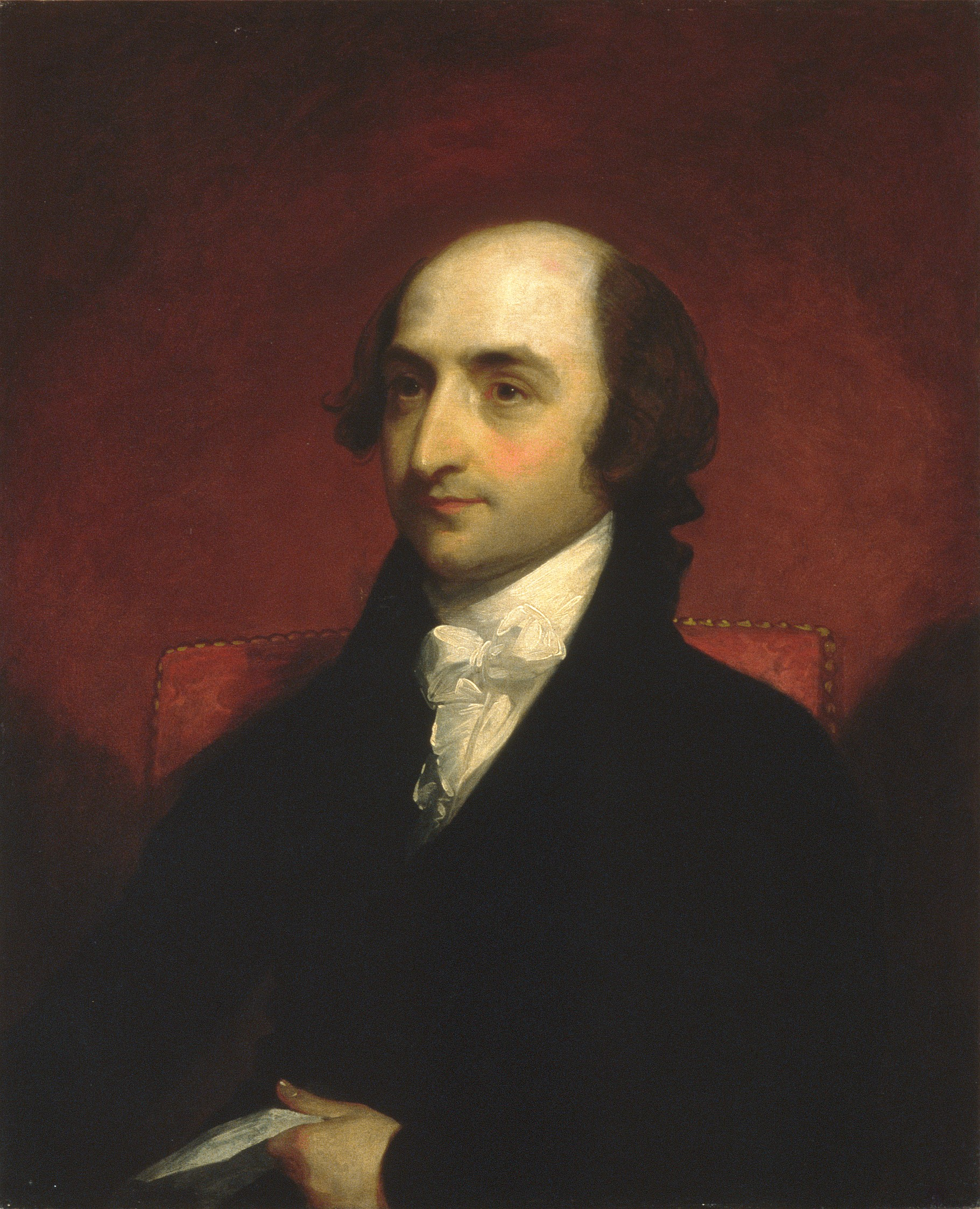
Albert Gallatin (1761–1849) by Gilbert Stuart

Albert Gallatin, secretary of the treasury under Thomas Jefferson and James Madison, declared his intention to establish "in this immense and fast-growing city ... a system of rational and practical education fitting and graciously opened to all." A three-day-long "literary and scientific convention" held in City Hall in 1830 and attended by over 100 delegates debated the terms of a plan for a new university. These New Yorkers believed the city needed a university designed for young men who would be admitted based upon merit rather than birthright or social class.

On April 18, 1831, the institution that would become NYU was established with the support of a group of prominent New York City residents from the city's merchants, bankers, and traders. Albert Gallatin was elected as its first president. On April 21, 1831, the new institution received its charter and was incorporated as the University of the City of New York by the New York State Legislature; older documents often refer to it by that name. The university has been popularly known as New York University since its inception and was officially renamed New York University in 1896. In 1832, NYU held its first classes in rented rooms of four-story Clinton Hall, situated near City Hall. In 1835, the School of Law, NYU's first professional school, was established. Although the impetus to found a new school was partly a reaction by evangelical Presbyterians to what they perceived as the Episcopalianism of Columbia College, NYU was created non-denominational, unlike many American colleges at the time. The American Chemical Society was founded in 1876 at NYU.

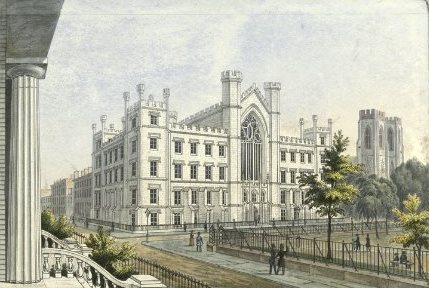
NYU building in Washington Square, 1850

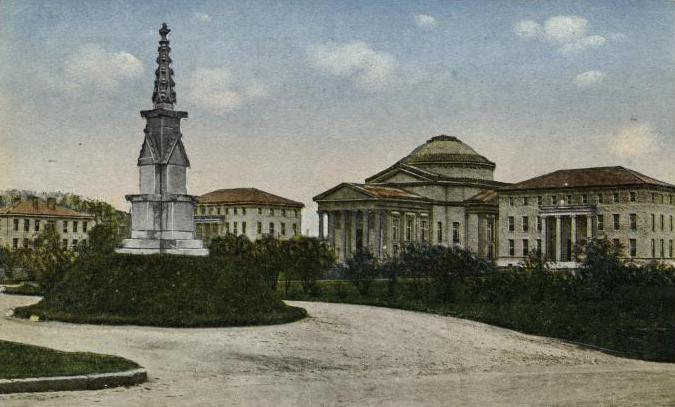
The University Heights campus, now home to Bronx Community College

Soon after its founding, it became one of the nation's largest universities, with an enrollment of 9,300 in 1917. The university purchased a campus at University Heights in the Bronx because of overcrowding on the old campus. NYU also had a desire to follow New York City's development further uptown. NYU's move to the Bronx occurred in 1894, spearheaded by the efforts of Chancellor Henry Mitchell MacCracken. The University Heights campus was far more spacious than its predecessor was. As a result, most of the university's operations, along with the undergraduate College of Arts and Science and School of Engineering, were housed there. NYU's administrative operations were moved to the new campus, but the graduate schools of the university remained at Washington Square. In 1914, Washington Square College was founded as the downtown undergraduate college of NYU. In 1935, NYU opened the "Nassau College-Hofstra Memorial of New York University at Hempstead, Long Island." This extension would later become a fully independent Hofstra University.

In 1950, NYU was elected to the Association of American Universities, a nonprofit organization of leading public and private research universities. Financial crisis gripped the New York City government in the late 1960s and early 1970s, and the troubles spread to the city's institutions, including NYU. Feeling the pressures of imminent bankruptcy, NYU President James McNaughton Hester negotiated the sale of the University Heights campus to the City University of New York, which occurred in 1973. In 1973, the New York University School of Engineering and Science merged into Polytechnic Institute of Brooklyn, which eventually merged back into NYU in 2014, forming the present Tandon School of Engineering. After the sale of the Bronx campus, University College merged with Washington Square College. In the 1980s, under the leadership of President John Brademas, NYU launched a billion-dollar campaign that was led by Naomi B. Levine and was spent almost entirely on updating facilities. The campaign was set to complete in 15 years, but ended up being completed in 10.

In 1991, L. Jay Oliva was inaugurated the 14th president of the university. Following his inauguration, he moved to form the League of World Universities, an international organization consisting of rectors and presidents from urban universities across six continents. The league and its 47 representatives gather every two years to discuss global issues in education. In 2003, President John Sexton launched a $2.5 billion campaign for funds to be spent especially on faculty and financial aid resources. Under Sexton's leadership, NYU also began its transformation into a global university, including the opening of a campus in Abu Dhabi in 2010.

Mortgage loans issued to some administrators and faculty by the university were criticized following published reports of August 2013, detailing terms of the loans, including that the school had issued some which approached zero percent interest rates, and some that were partially forgiven. Uniquely, among universities, the school had also issued multi-million-dollar loans for luxury vacation homes. President Sexton would step down at the end of his term in 2016, in the wake of a vote of no confidence in March 2013, closely followed by controversy over having received a vacation home loan from NYU. In August 2018, the New York University Grossman School of Medicine announced it would be offering full-tuition scholarships to all current and future students in its MD program regardless of need or merit, making it the only top-10 medical school in the United States to do so. In Spring 2022, President Andrew D. Hamilton announced that the 2023 academic year would be his last, and that he would be returning to research. He was succeeded by Linda G. Mills, the university's first female president.

=== Enrollment ===
NYU experienced a large increase in applications to its university system, increasing from around 35,000 applicants in 2007 to more than 120,000 in 2024 and 2025. This has also caused the acceptance rate to drop significantly, with a record-low acceptance rate of 8% in 2023 and 2024. In 2025, this number dropped even further to 7.7% for the upcoming Class of 2029. In parallel to NYU's expansion in the early 1900s, the university similarly expanded vigorously in the early 2000s, becoming the largest private university in the United States with a combined undergraduate/graduate enrollment of over 59,000 students as of 2018.

=== University logo ===
The university logo, the upheld torch, is derived from the Statue of Liberty, signifying NYU's service to New York City. The torch is depicted on both the NYU seal and the more abstract NYU logo, designed in 1965 by renowned graphic designer Tom Geismar of the branding and design firm Chermayeff & Geismar. There are at least two versions of the possible origin of the university color, violet. Some believe that it may have been chosen because violets are said to have grown abundantly in Washington Square and around the buttresses of the Old University Building. Others argue that the color may have been adopted because the violet was the flower associated with Athens, the center of learning in ancient Greece.

=== Cultural setting ===
Washington Square and Greenwich Village have been hubs of cultural life in New York City since the early 19th century. Much of this culture has intersected with NYU at various points in its history. Artists of the Hudson River School, the United States' first prominent school of painters, settled around Washington Square. Samuel F.B. Morse, a noted artist who also pioneered the telegraph and created the Morse Code, served as the first chair of Painting and Sculpture. He and Daniel Huntington were early tenants of the Old University Building in the mid-19th century. (The university rented out studio space and residential apartments within the "academic" building.) As a result, they had notable interaction with the cultural and academic life of the university.

In the 1870s, sculptors Augustus Saint-Gaudens and Daniel Chester French lived and worked near the Square. By the 1920s, Washington Square Park was nationally recognized as a focal point for artistic and moral rebellion. As such, the Washington Square campus became more diverse and bustled with urban energy, contributing to academic change at NYU. Famed residents of this time include Eugene O'Neill, John Sloan, and Maurice Prendergast. In the 1930s, the abstract expressionists Jackson Pollock and Willem de Kooning, and the realists Edward Hopper and Thomas Hart Benton had studios around Washington Square. In the 1960s the area became one of the centers of the beat and folk generation, when Allen Ginsberg and Bob Dylan settled there. This led to tension with the university, which at the time was in the midst of an aggressive facilities expansion phase. In 1975, the university opened The Grey Art Gallery at 100 Washington Square East, housing the NYU art collection and featuring museum quality exhibitions.

=== Budget and fundraising ===
NYU has successfully completed a seven-year, $2.5 billion campaign, surpassing expectations by raising more than $3 billion over the seven-year period. Started in 2001, this campaign was the university's largest in its history, in which they planned to "raise $1 million per day for scholarships and financial aid, faculty building, new academic initiatives, and enhancing NYU's physical facilities." The campaign included a $50 million gift from the Tisch family (after which one building and the art school are named) and a $60 million gift from six trustees called "The Partners Fund", aimed at hiring new faculty. On October 15, 2007, the university announced that the Silver family donated $50 million to the School of Social Work, which will be renamed as a result. This is the largest donation ever to a school of social work in the United States.

The 2007–2008 academic year was the most successful fundraising year to date for NYU, with the school raising $698 million in only the first 11 months of the year, representing a 70% increase in donations from the prior year. The university also recently announced plans for NYU's Call to Action, a new initiative to ask alumni and donors to support financial aid for students at NYU.

The university has announced a 25-year strategic development plan, scheduled to coincide with its bicentennial in 2031. Included in the "NYU 200" plans are increasing resident and academic space, hiring additional faculty, and involving the New York City community in a transparent planning process. Additionally, NYU hopes to make their buildings more environmentally friendly, which will be facilitated by an evaluation of all campus spaces. As a part of this plan, NYU purchased 118 million kilowatt-hours of wind power during the 2006–2007 academic year – the largest purchase of wind power by any university in the country and any institution in New York City. For 2007, the university expanded its purchase of wind power to 132 million kilowatt-hours. As a result, the EPA ranked NYU as one of the greenest colleges in the country in its annual College & University Green Power Challenge.

NYU consistently ranks as one of the top fundraising institutions in the country, raising $506.4 million in 2015 and $648 million in 2016. NYU is also the 19th wealthiest university in America with $5.3 billion in cash and investments in fiscal year 2014.

== Campus ==
NYU's New York City campus includes more than 171 buildings spread between Manhattan and Brooklyn. Most of the school's buildings in Manhattan are located across a roughly 230-acre (93 ha) area bounded by Houston Street to the south, Broadway to the east, 14th Street to the north, and Sixth Avenue (Avenue of the Americas) to the west. The core of NYU consists of buildings that surround Washington Square Park. In addition to its New York campus, NYU has 49 additional buildings overseas located throughout two 'portal' campuses and 12 Global Academic Centers.

=== Washington Square campus ===
Washington Square Park, with its gateway arch, is surrounded largely by NYU buildings and plays an integral role in campus life.

Since the late 1970s, the central part of NYU has been its Washington Square campus in the heart of Greenwich Village. The Washington Square Arch is an unofficial symbol of NYU. Until 2007, NYU had held its commencement ceremonies in Washington Square Park, but because of renovations to Washington Square moved the 2008 ceremonies to the original Yankee Stadium and all subsequent ones to the current Yankee Stadium.

The Silver Center for Arts and Science, home to the College of Arts & Science and the Graduate School of Arts & Science, is one of the main academic buildings on the Washington Square campus. It is located on Washington Square East, between Washington Place and Waverly Place, and many individual departments of the two schools it houses are located in its vicinity. Meanwhile, Vanderbilt Hall, the main building for the School of Law, is located near the southwest corner of Washington Square between Macdougal Street and Sullivan Street on Washington Square South. The Kimmel Center for University Life is also on Washington Square South, and is the primary hub for student life at the university, providing event and meeting space for student organizations and other gatherings. Located closer to the eastern edge of the campus along Broadway are the main buildings for the Tisch School of the Arts and the Gallatin School of Individualized Study, as well as the main office for Liberal Studies and NYU's Bookstore and Student Health Center. Other nearby university buildings and complexes of note include 5 Washington Place, which houses NYU's distinguished Department of Philosophy, 7 East 12th Street, which serves as the main building for the School of Professional Studies, the Brown Building, which was the location of the infamous Triangle Shirtwaist Factory Fire before its acquisition by NYU, as well as Washington Square Village and University Village, two housing complexes for faculty members and graduate students. Undergraduate residence halls in the immediate surroundings of Washington Square include Goddard Hall, Lipton Hall, and Weinstein Hall, while those that are slightly farther but still nearby include Brittany Hall and Rubin Hall.

In the 1990s, NYU became a "two square" university by building a second community around Union Square, in close proximity to Washington Square. NYU's Union Square community primarily consists of the priority residence halls of Carlyle Court, Palladium Residence Hall, Alumni Hall, Coral Tower, Thirteenth Street Hall, University Hall, Third North Residence Hall, and Founders Hall.

On its Washington Square campus, NYU operates theaters and performance facilities that are often used by the Tisch School of the Arts as well as the university's music conservatory, which is within the Steinhardt School of Culture, Education, and Human Development. External productions are also occasionally held in NYU's facilities. The largest performance accommodations at NYU are the Skirball Center for Performing Arts (850 seats) at 566 LaGuardia Place, just south of Washington Square South, and the Eisner-Lubin Auditorium (560 seats) in the Kimmel Center. Notably, the Skirball Center has hosted important speeches on foreign policy by John Kerry and Al Gore. The Skirball Center is the largest performing arts facility south of 42nd Street.

NYU also has international houses meant to foster the study of particular cultures and languages on its Washington Square campus, including the Deutsches Haus, La Maison Française, Casa Italiana Zerilli Marimò, the Glucksman Ireland House to foster Irish studies, the King Juan Carlos I of Spain Center, the Hagop Kevorkian Center, an Africa House, and a China House. Most of these international houses are located on Washington Mews, a private street north of Washington Square Park.

The closest New York City Subway stations servicing the Washington Square campus are Eighth Street–New York University and West Fourth Street–Washington Square. In addition, NYU runs its own shuttle service, University Transportation Services, linking the Washington Square campus to other university locations and major transit hubs. The nearest major highway is the West Side Highway (NY 9A) to the west. The campus is located less than 1 mile (1.6 km) from the Holland Tunnel, and 4 miles (6.4 km) from the Brooklyn Bridge.

==== Gould Plaza ====
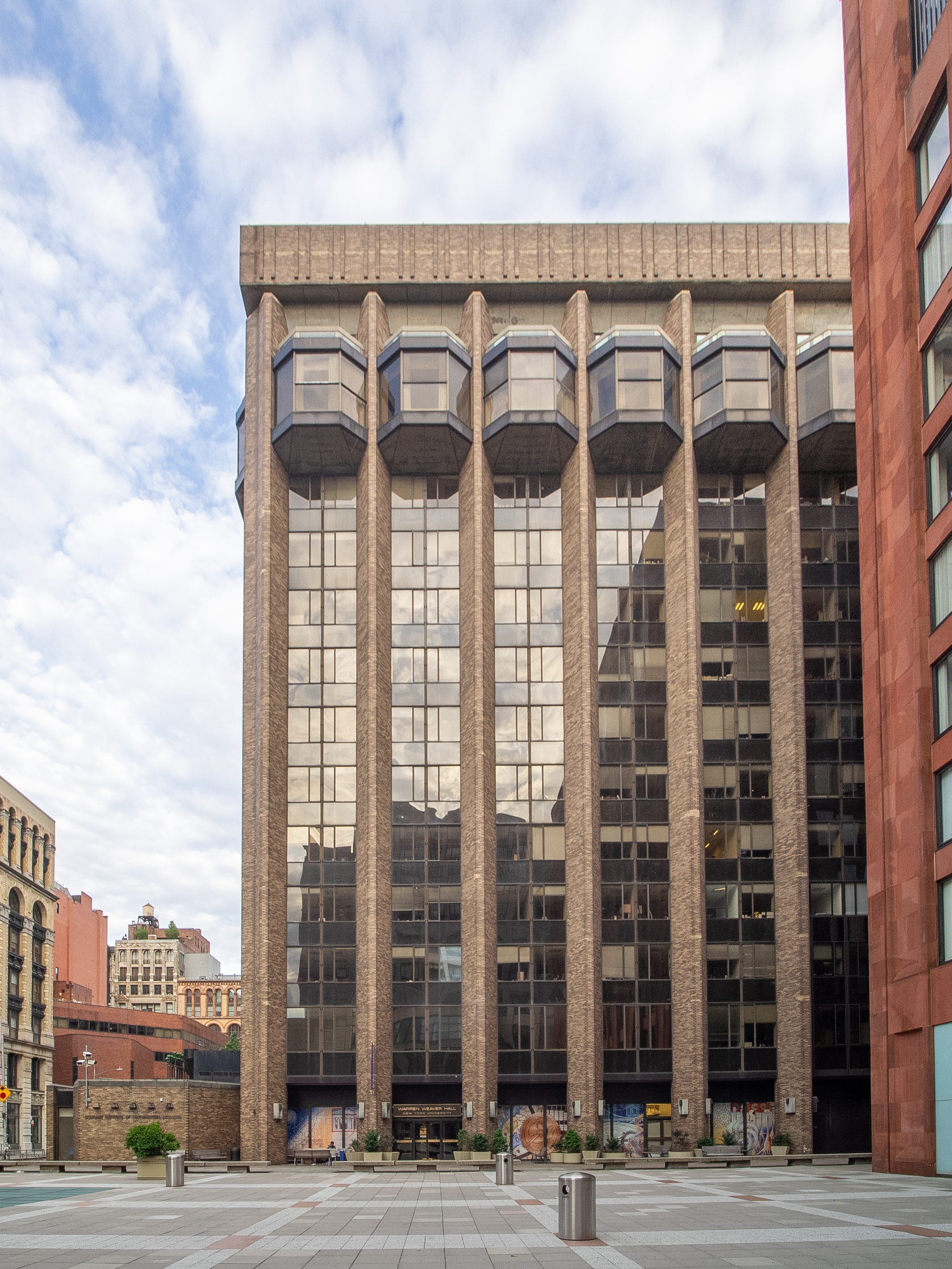
Courant Institute

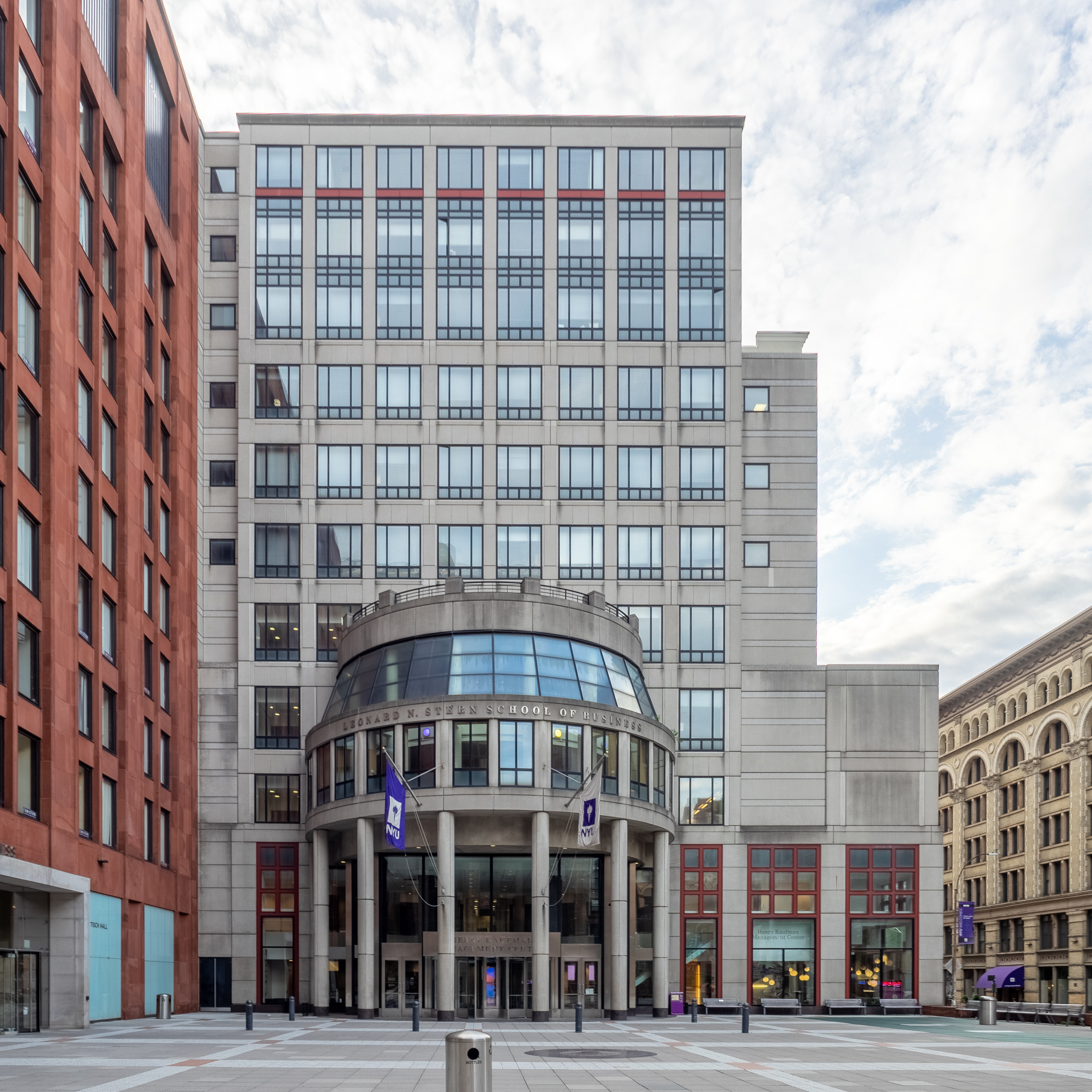
Stern School of Business

The Jeffrey S. Gould Plaza, located between Washington Square East and Mercer Street on West 4th Street, is surrounded by the buildings for some departments of the College of Arts and Science as well as the main buildings for the Stern School of Business and the Courant Institute of Mathematical Sciences. Other NYU buildings near the plaza include the Bonomi Family Admissions Center, the Jeffrey S. Gould Welcome Center, the Alumni Relations building, Goddard Hall, Frederick Loewe Theatre, and the main building for the Steinhardt School of Culture, Education, and Human Development, as well as unrelated religious institutions such as Judson Memorial Church, the Islamic Center at NYU, and Hebrew Union College - Jewish Institute of Religion. Because of its high student traffic during the academic year, Gould Plaza has become a popular meeting spot for NYU students and a performance area for street musicians and buskers.

==== Bobst Library ====
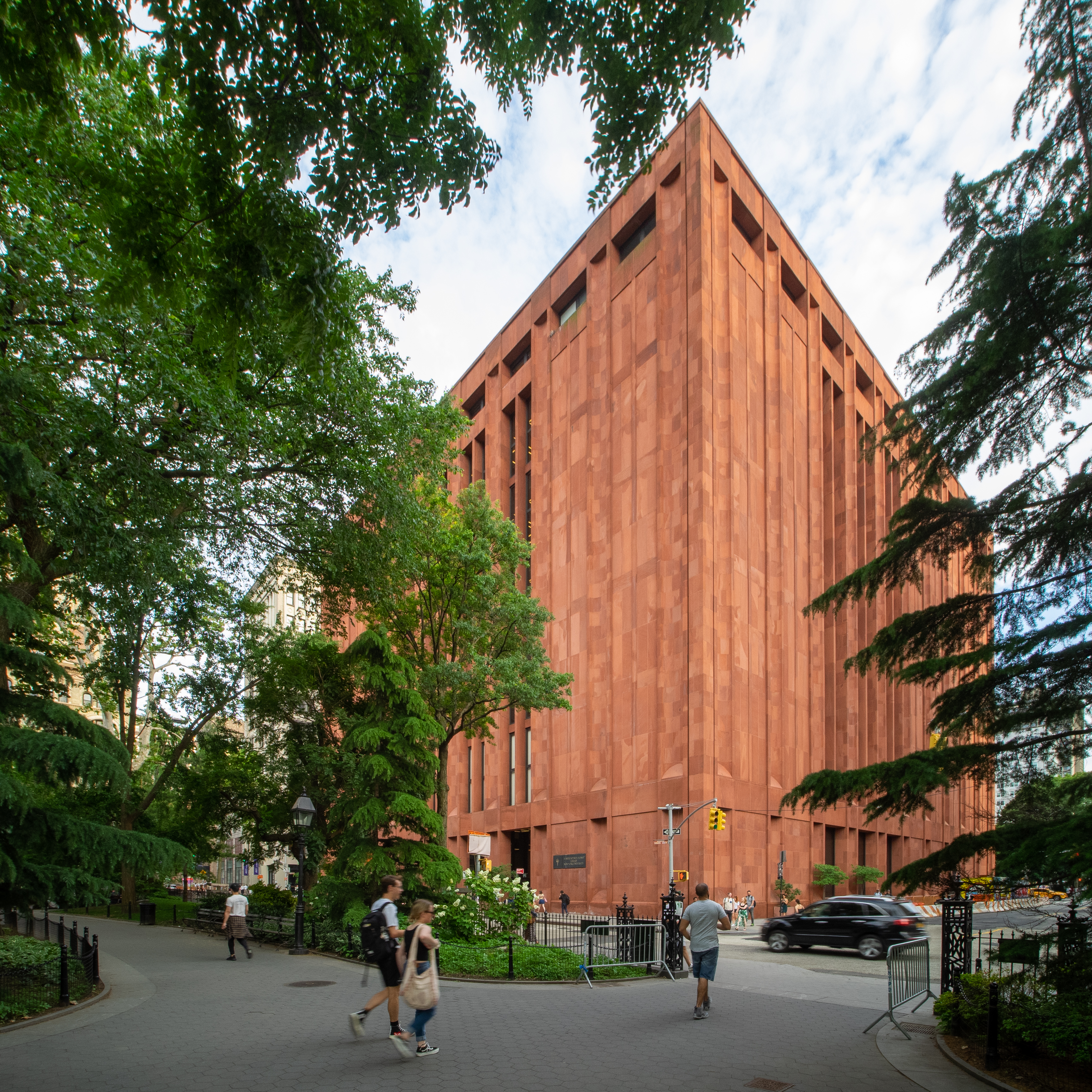
Bobst Library

The Elmer Holmes Bobst Library, built between 1967 and 1972, is the largest library at NYU and one of the largest academic libraries in the United States. Designed by Philip Johnson and Richard Foster, the 12-story, 425,000-square-foot (39,500 m^{2}) structure sits on the southern edge of Washington Square Park (at 70 Washington Square South) and is the flagship of an eight-library, 4.5 million-volume system. Bobst Library offers one Multidisciplinary Reference Center, a Research Commons, 28 miles (45 km) of open-stacks shelving, and approximately 2,000 seats for student study. The library is visited by more than 6,800 users each day, and circulates more than one million books annually.

Bobst's Avery Fisher Center for Music and Media is one of the world's largest academic media centers, where students and researchers use more than 95,000 audio and video recordings per year.

Bobst Library is also home to many special collections. The Fales Collection houses collections of English and American fiction in the United States, the unique Downtown Collection, documenting the New York literary avant-garde arts scene from the 1970s to the present, and the Food and Cookery Collection, which documents American food history with a focus on New York City. Bobst Library also houses the Tamiment Library, which holds collections in labor history, socialism, anarchism, communism, and American radicalism for scholarly research. Tamiment includes the Robert F. Wagner Labor Archives, the Archives of Irish America, the Center for the Cold War and the U.S., and the Frederic Ewen Academic Freedom Center.

Bobst Library made headlines in the early 2000s when Steven Stanzak, who is also known as "Bobst Boy", gained a following for living in Bobst Library after he was unable to pay for board at the university and began to write about his life on a self published blog. The story was reported by Washington Square News before becoming an overnight national sensation, which helped Stanzak receive financial assistance from NYU until graduation.

=== Brooklyn campus ===
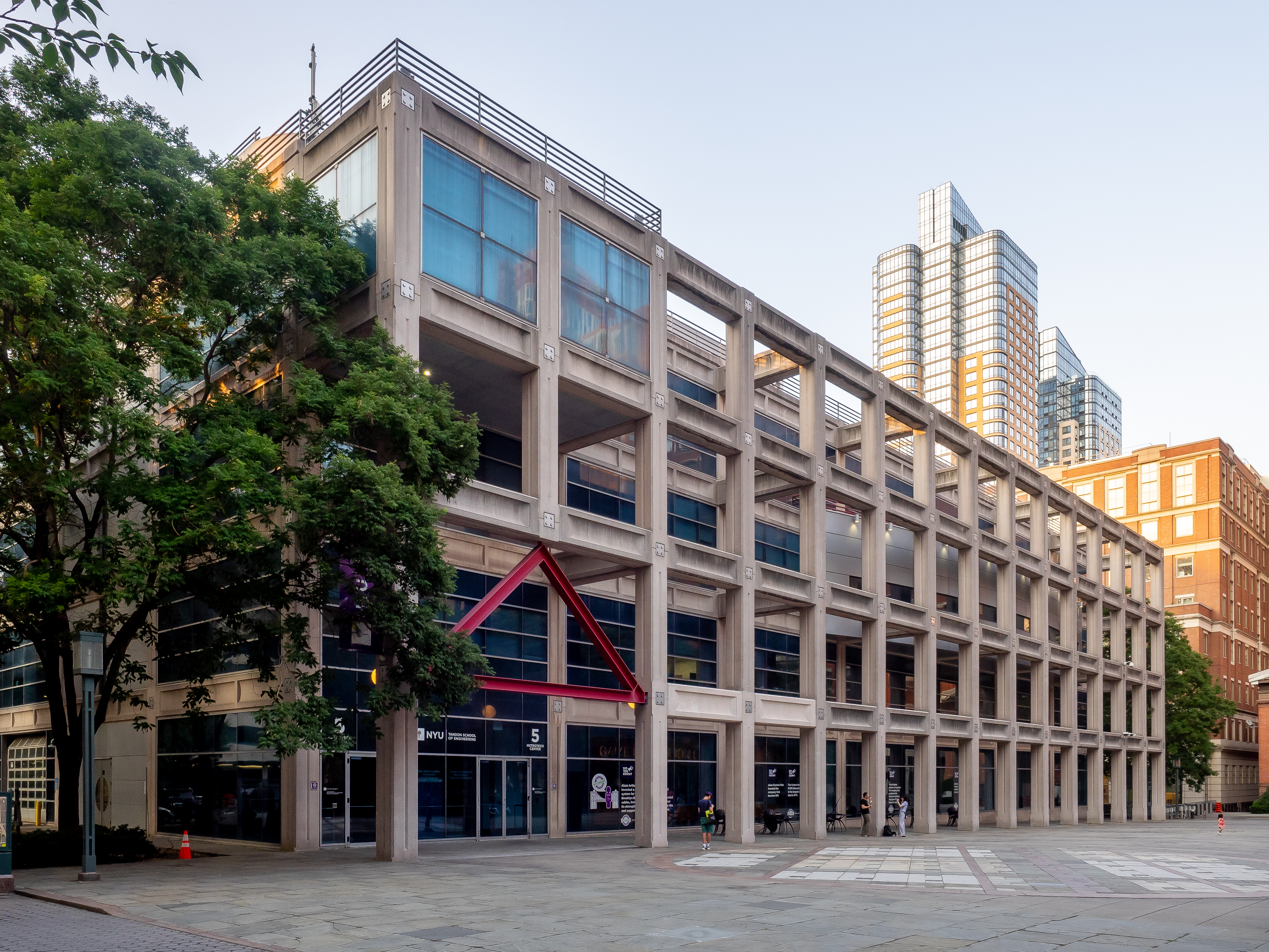
Bern Dibner Library of Science and Technology on the Brooklyn campus

NYU's Brooklyn campus is located at MetroTech Center, an urban academic-industrial research park. It sits on top of the Jay Street–MetroTech station, is only a few blocks from the Brooklyn Bridge, and is connected to NYU's Manhattan campus via the NYU Shuttle Bus System. It houses the Tandon School of Engineering, the Center for Urban Science and Progress and also several of Tisch School of the Arts and Steinhardt School of Culture, Education, and Human Development's degree programs.

MetroTech Commons, the 3.5-acre (14,000 m^{2}) privately owned public space at the heart of the MetroTech complex, functions as a quad for students at the Brooklyn campus in much the same way that Washington Square Park does for students at the main campus, hosting events including concerts, health fairs, chess tournaments and holiday celebrations. Bounded by Lawrence and Duffield Streets, the square is frequently adorned by modern art exhibits. Two pieces called Alligator and Visionary are part of the Commons' permanent public art collection by the well-known sculptor Tom Otterness.

The Brooklyn campus is home to NYU's Game Center Open Library, which is the largest collection of games held by any university in the world, as well as the NYU MakerSpace and Design Lab, which allows all NYU students who undergo training sessions to access advanced 3D printing, prototyping, CNC machining, and stress testing devices.

In 2014, NYU Langone Medical Center acquired a 125,000 square feet (11,600 m^{2}) healthcare facility in Brooklyn. Quickly following this announcement, NYU announced in 2017 that it would invest over $500 million in the coming years to renovate and expand its Brooklyn campus, including 370 Jay Street, which opened in December 2017.

=== Other NY metropolitan area facilities ===
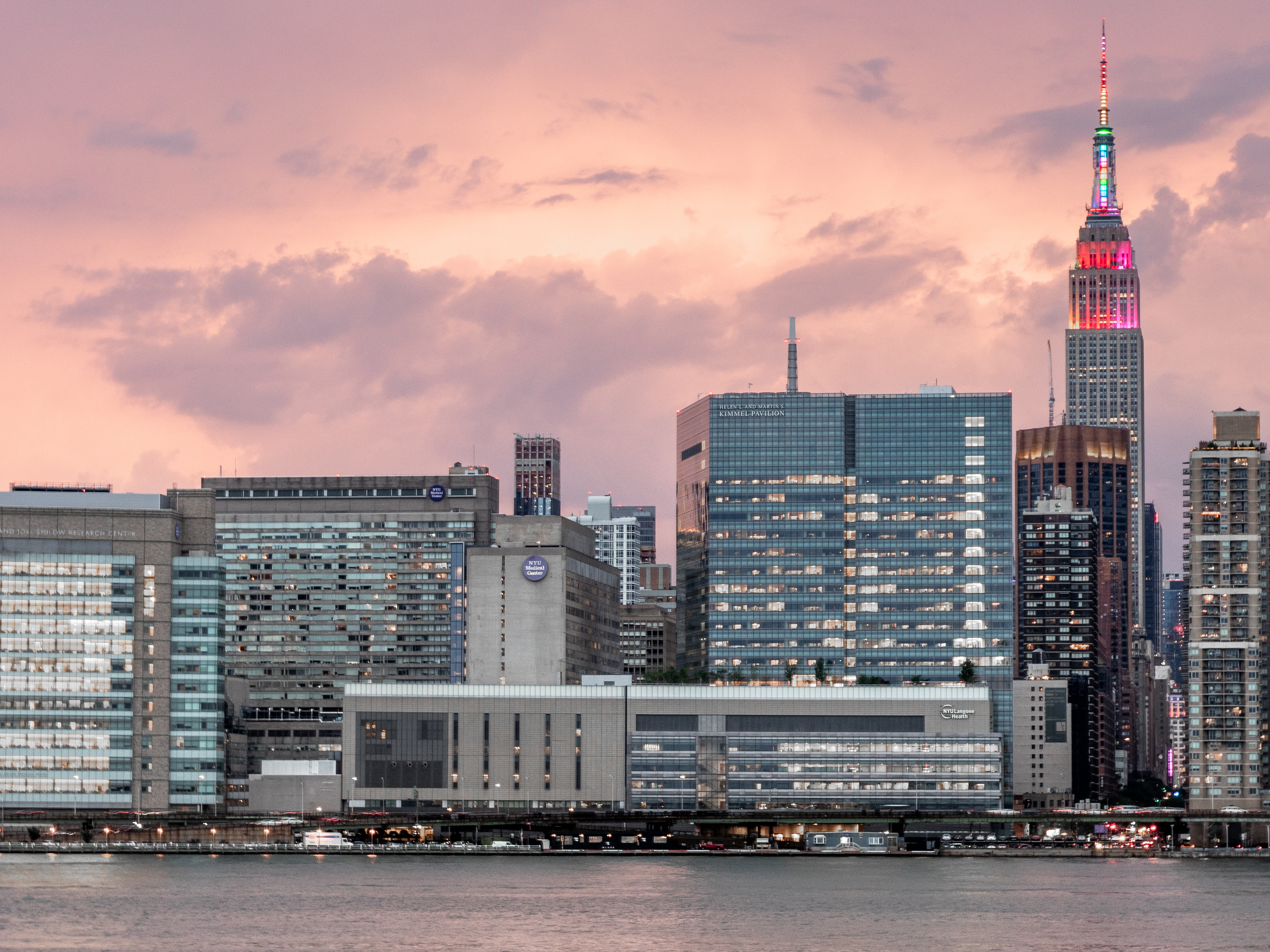
NYU Langone Health

The NYU Langone Health medical center is situated near the East River waterfront at 550 First Avenue between East 30th and 34th Streets. The campus hosts the NYU Grossman School of Medicine, Tisch Hospital, Kimmel Pavilion, Hassenfeld Children's Hospital, and the Rusk Institute of Rehabilitation Medicine. Other NYU and NYU-affiliated medical centers across the city include the NYU Langone Orthopedic Hospital, the NYU Langone Hospital – Brooklyn, and the Bellevue Hospital. In Mineola, Long Island, the NYU Langone Hospital – Long Island campus is home to NYU's second medical school, the NYU Grossman Long Island School of Medicine.

NYU's Silver School of Social Work (formerly Ehrenkranz School of Social Work) manages branch campus programs in Westchester County at Sarah Lawrence College and in Rockland County at St. Thomas Aquinas College.

In Sterling Forest, near Tuxedo, NYU has a research facility that contains various institutes, in particular the Nelson Institute of Environmental Medicine. The Midtown Center at 11 West 42nd Street is home to the NYU Schack Institute of Real Estate. The Woolworth Building in the financial district is home to some of NYU's professional studies and education programs.

NYU has two units located on the Upper East Side. The Institute for the Study of the Ancient World, a discrete entity within NYU, independent of any other school or department of the university, is located on East 84th Street, while the Institute of Fine Arts, a graduate school of art history and fine arts, is located at the James B. Duke House at 1 East 78th Street. Additionally, the nearby Stephen Chan House at 14 East 78th Street houses the Conservation Center of the Institute of Fine Arts, which boasts the oldest graduate degree-granting conservation program in the world.

=== Global campuses and sites ===
NYU has a host of foreign facilities used for study away programs, referred to as Global Academic Centers. As of 2026, NYU operates 13 academic sites in Africa, Asia and the Middle East, Australia, Europe, North America, and South America, including undergraduate academic-year and summer study away programs in Accra, Berlin, Buenos Aires, Florence, London, Los Angeles, Madrid, Paris, Prague, Sydney, Tel Aviv, Tulsa, and Washington, D.C. One of the most noteworthy sites is the 57-acre (230,000 m^{2}) campus of NYU Florence, located at Villa LaPietra in Italy. The estate was bequeathed by the late Sir Harold Acton to NYU in 1994, and at the time it was the largest donation to a university in history. In spring 2014, NYU Paris moved to a new campus, formerly occupied by the École Spéciale des Travaux Publics (ESTP Paris), in the student area of the Quartier Latin, where NYU Law also set up an EU Regulatory Policy Clinic in partnership with HEC Paris taught by Alberto Alemanno and Vincent Chauvet.

In addition to the Global Academic Centers, NYU also maintains 10 Global Research Initiative Institutes, 9 of them are located in the academic centers at Berlin, Florence, London, Madrid, Paris, Prague, Shanghai, Tel Aviv, and Washington DC, with the other being located in Athens. Meant to provide faculty and graduate students with NYU infrastructural support while conducting international research projects, those who are interested can apply for fellowships at all sites during the academic-year and a limited number of sites during the summer.

==== Abu Dhabi campus ====
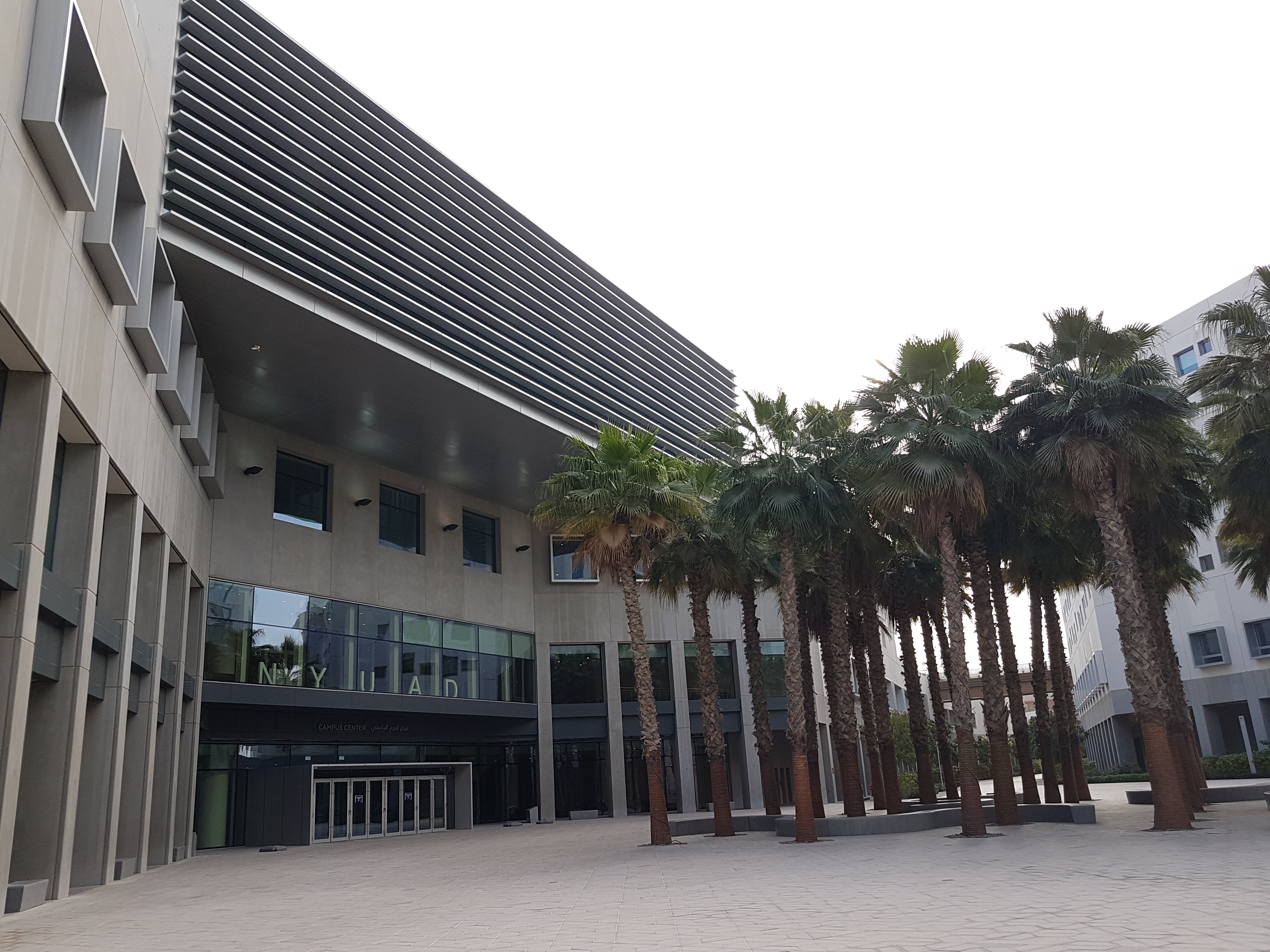
NYU Abu Dhabi

Spearheaded by John Sexton, president of the university during 2002–2015; in Fall 2010, New York University Abu Dhabi (NYUAD) opened as the university's first overseas "Portal Campus" with an inaugural class of 150 students.

The campus faced controversy even before it opened. In 2009, the university responded to a series of interviews in The New York Times that showed a pattern of labor abuses at its fledgling Abu Dhabi location (which would open for classes the next year), creating a statement of labor values for Abu Dhabi campus workers. A 2014 follow-up article found that while some conditions had improved, contractors for the university were still frequently subjecting their workers to third-world labor conditions. The article documented that these conditions included confiscation of worker passports, forced overtime, recruitment fees and cockroach-filled dorms where workers had to sleep under beds. According to the article, workers who attempted to protest the NYU contractors' conditions were promptly arrested. Reports also claimed that those arrested by police were later abused at the police station. Many workers who were not local were then deported to their home countries. The university quickly responded to the reports with an apology to the workers. Though the campus construction costs were entirely funded by the Abu Dhabi government, as will be the operational costs and any future expansions, in 2015, NYU additionally compensated thousands of migrant workers on its Abu Dhabi complex.

Unlike NYU's other study abroad centers, NYUAD functions as a separate liberal arts college within a university, offering complete degree programs to students admitted directly to NYUAD. NYUAD recruits students from all over the world and describes itself as the "World's Honor College". The main campus for NYUAD is on Saadiyat Island and opened in 2014. Until then, the school operated from a campus located in downtown Abu Dhabi.

==== Shanghai campus ====
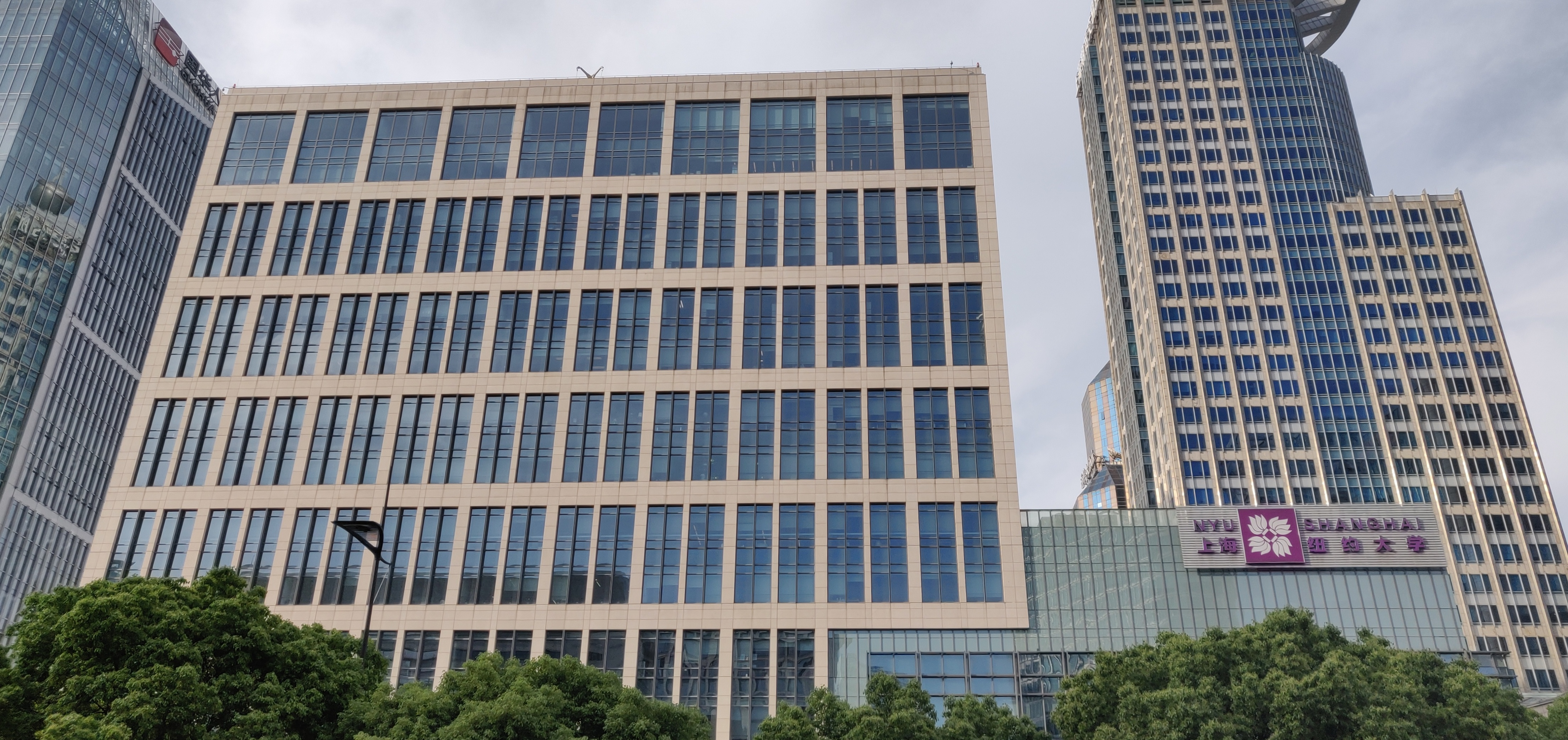
NYU Shanghai

In 2011, NYU announced plans to open another portal campus, NYU Shanghai, for the fall semester of 2013. It was expected to have about 3,000 undergraduate students, the majority of whom would be Chinese. It was approved by the Ministry of Education of the People's Republic of China in January 2011. NYU's local partner would be East China Normal University (ECNU). ECNU's president Yu Lizhong would be the chancellor and play a major role in government relations while Jeffrey S. Lehman, former president of Cornell amongst other positions, would serve as vice chancellor and have "free rein in academic affairs". Since late summer of 2014, NYU Shanghai has been based in Pudong, Shanghai, at 1555 Century Ave. The main campus is contained in a single building, the Academic Center, a new 15-story building with two underground floors. On May 30, 2019, the groundbreaking ceremony was held for the new campus building in the Qiantan International Business Zone. The Qiantan campus building is also located in Pudong, and was designed and built by architectural firm Kohn Pedersen Fox. The design features four buildings arranged in a pinwheel shape reminiscent of NYU Shanghai's logo, that are connected as one building above the fifth floor. In 2022, the university moved up to 4,000 undergraduate and graduate students into the new campus.

==== Former global campuses ====
Tisch School of the Arts, Asia was NYU's first branch campus abroad. The result of a partnership between Tisch School of the Arts and the Singapore Government, it offered Master of Fine Arts degrees in animation and digital arts, dramatic writing, film and international media producing. The campus opened in fall 2007 with the intention to enroll approximately 250 students. Anticipated enrollment figures were not achieved, financial irregularities were alleged, and President Pari Sara Shirazi was dismissed from her post by NYU in November 2011. She subsequently announced her intention to commence legal proceedings against NYU alleging wrongful termination and defamation. In a letter to the Tisch Asia community dated November 8, 2012, Dean Mary Schmidt Campbell announced that the campus would close after 2014 with recruitment and admission of new students suspended with immediate effect. In 2016, three former students of the now defunct Tisch Asia sued NYU.

Before moving to its current location at the former campus of ESTP Paris, NYU Paris was located in a small building in the historic neighborhood of Passy.

=== Residence halls ===
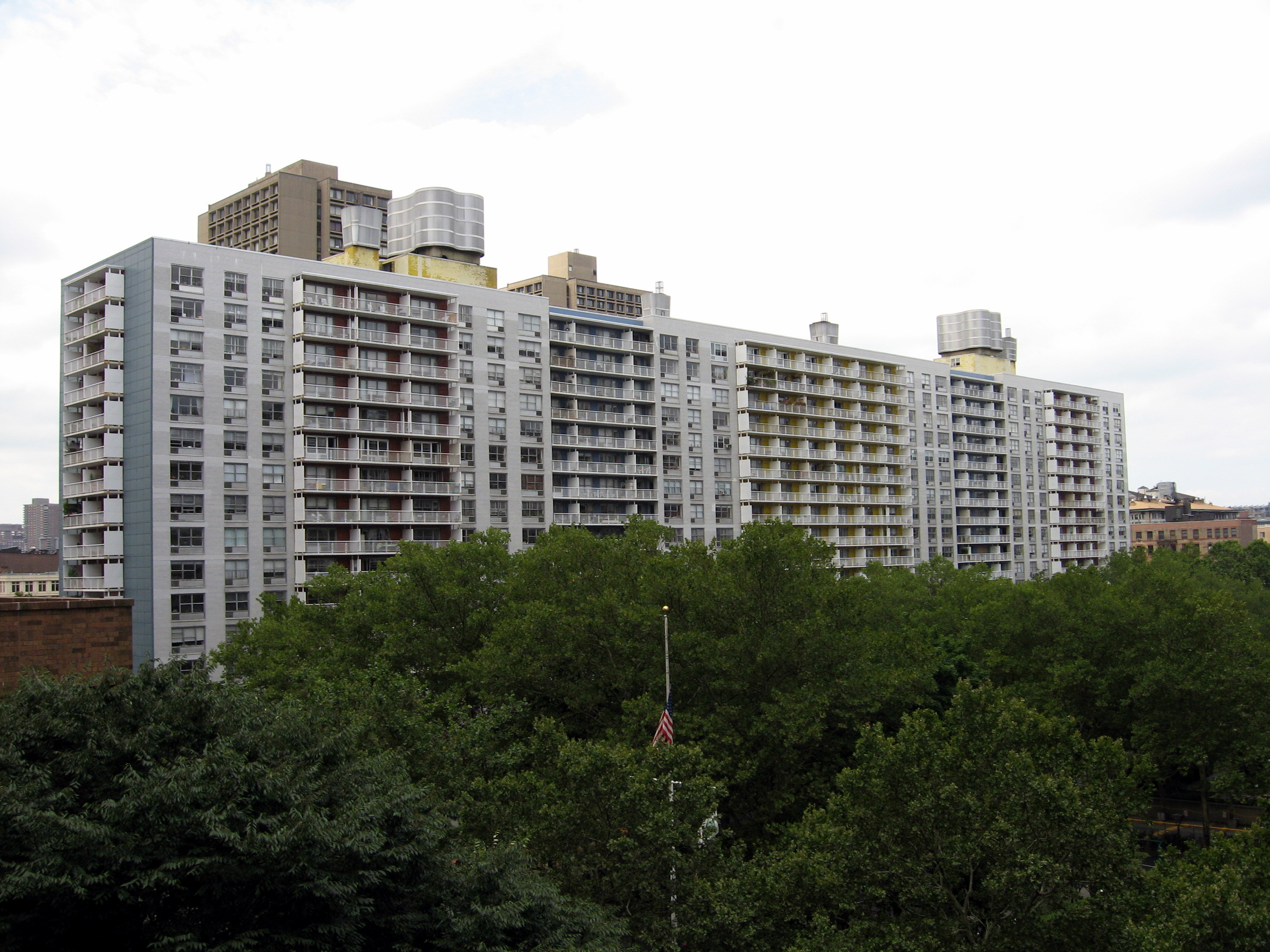
Washington Square Village, home to NYU faculty and graduate students

NYU houses approximately 12,000 undergraduate and graduate residents, and had the seventh-largest university housing system in the U.S. as of 2007, and one of the largest among private schools. NYU's undergraduate housing system consists of more than 20 residence halls and is governed by the Inter-Residence Hall Council (IRHC), an umbrella student council organization.

Uniquely, many of NYU's residence halls are converted apartment complexes or old hotels. In general, NYU residence halls receive favorable ratings, and some are opulent. Many rooms are spacious and contain amenities considered rare for individual college residence hall rooms, such as kitchens, lavatories, living rooms and common areas. The university operates its own transit system to transport its students by bus to its campus. A few of the residence halls are considered to be among the nicest in the nation, being furnished with granite counter-tops, stainless-steel appliances, in-hall gyms, wood flooring, marble bathroom fixtures, large floor lounges, floor to ceiling windows and extensive views of lower and midtown Manhattan.

Undergraduate students are guaranteed housing during their enrollment at NYU and are split into two categories, FYRE (First-Year Residential Experience) and TRUE (The Residential Upperclassmen Experience). Most FYRE halls are located near the Washington Square area. While nearly all TRUE halls are located near the Union Square area, two former residence halls were located in the Financial District and one is still in use in Chinatown. Two residence halls are located in and around the MetroTech Commons, intended to serve NYU's Brooklyn Campus.

In 2007, the National Association of College and University Residence Halls (NACURH) named NYU the National School of the Year for IRHC and NRHH's strong efforts over the past year. In addition, NYU was named the National Program of the Year for UltraViolet Live, the annual inter-hall competition that raises funds for Relay For Life.

=== Sustainability ===
NYU has made the greening of its campus a large priority. For example, NYU has been the largest university purchaser of wind energy in the U.S. since 2009. With this switch to renewable power, NYU is achieving benefits equivalent to removing 12,000 cars from the road or planting 72,000 trees. In May 2008, the NYU Sustainability Task Force awarded $150,000 in grants to 23 projects that would focus research and efforts toward energy, food, landscape, outreach, procurement, transportation and waste. These projects include a student-led bike-sharing program modeled after Paris' Velib program with 30 bikes free to students, staff, and faculty. NYU received a grade of "B" on the College Sustainability Report Card 2010 from the Sustainable Endowments Institute.

NYU purchased 118 million kilowatt-hours of wind power during the 2006–2007 academic year – the largest purchase of wind power by any university in the country and any institution in New York City. For 2007, the university expanded its purchase of wind power to 132 million kilowatt-hours.

The EPA ranked NYU as one of the greenest colleges in the country in its annual College & University Green Power Challenge.

=== NYU 2031 ===
In 2007, NYU created a strategic plan for a six billion-dollar, 25-year, 6,000,000-square-foot (560,000 m^{2}) expansion scheduled to conclude by the university's bicentennial in 2031. Details of the plan include 2,000,000 sq ft (190,000 m^{2}) of additional on-campus housing and 3,500,000 sq ft (330,000 m^{2}) of modern academic spaces spread between NYU's New York City campuses.

The expansion started in earnest in 2017 with the groundbreaking of 181 Mercer Street, a new multi-purpose building that will act as the flagship athletic facility for NYU, while also accompanying a 350-bed Residence Hall, 58 general purpose classrooms and a 350-seat theater. The roughly 800,000-square-foot (74,000 m^{2}), $1.1 billion building is directly adjacent to the south eastern corner of the Washington Square campus and represents a significant focus on the university owned super blocks. Work on the plans second project, 370 Jay Street, a 500,000-square-foot (46,000 m^{2}) addition to the Brooklyn campus is scheduled to conclude in 2019. The building will house 'the digital arts and sciences' such as the Tandon School of Engineering departments of Computer Science, Electrical and Computer Engineering; the Tisch School of the Arts Clive Davis Institute for Recorded Music and Game Center and various other NYU initiatives such as the Center for Urban Science and Progress (CUSP) and NYU Wireless (5G research).

To date, NYU has confirmed specific construction details for its NYU 2031 plan to the tune of 1,300,000 sq ft (120,000 m^{2}) at a cost of $1.6 billion with roughly 12 years to go until the university's bicentennial. In order to meet the plans outlined goals on time, the university would have to significantly increase spending, fundraising and construction over the next decade.

== Academics ==
=== Admissions and scholarships ===
Admission to NYU is highly selective. For the undergraduate first-year class of 2029, 7.7% were admitted from an applicant pool of more than 120,000. Three of NYU's undergraduate colleges offered admission to fewer than 5% of applicants. In 2021, NYU became the first private university in the US to top 100,000 applications.

Admission statistics, including global network
Class of	2029	2028	2027	2026	2025
Applicants	120,633	118,000	120,000	100,500	100,131
Admits	9,289	9,440	9,600	12,810	12,500
% admitted	7.7	8	8	12.2	12.8
Enrolled		5705	6,500	6,500	6,500

Of those admitted, about 6,500 made up the total enrollment for the class, representing 102 countries, all 50 US states, and the District of Columbia. Most freshmen have a typical unweighted GPA of 3.7/A (90–95%) and are in the top 10% of their high school graduating class. The median SAT score was 1540 out of 1600 (within the 99th percentile). The student-to-faculty ratio at the New York campus is 9:1, and less than that at the Abu Dhabi and Shanghai campuses. The average scholarship amount awarded to freshmen is over $35,000, and 20% of freshmen received Pell Grants.

As of 2016, NYU's graduate schools have acceptance rates of 1.8% to the School of Medicine, 23% to the School of Business, 28% to the School of Engineering, 29% to the Graduate School of Arts and Science, and 34% to the School of Law.

Average MCAT score of students at the School of Medicine is 522, average GMAT score of graduate students at the School of Business is 723, and the median LSAT score of students at the School of Law is 170.

=== Schools and leadership ===
NYU is a private, global, non-sectarian and not-for-profit institution of higher education organized into 10 undergraduate schools and 15 graduate/professional schools, with a roughly even split of students between the divisions. Arts and Science is currently NYU's largest academic division. It has three subdivisions: the College of Arts and Science, the Graduate School of Arts and Science, and the Liberal Studies program. The College of Arts and Science and Liberal Studies program are undergraduate divisions, and the former has existed since the founding of NYU.

NYU graduate/professional schools
College/school	Established
School of Law	1835
Grossman School of Medicine	1841
Tandon School of Engineering	1854
College of Dentistry	1865
Graduate School of Arts and Science	1886
Steinhardt School of Culture, Education, and Human Development	1890
Stern School of Business	1900
School of Professional Studies	1934
Robert F. Wagner Graduate School of Public Service	1938
Rory Meyers College of Nursing	1944
Silver School of Social Work	1960
Tisch School of the Arts	1965
Gallatin School of Individualized Study	1972
Center for Urban Science and Progress	2013
College of Global Public Health	2015
Grossman Long Island School of Medicine	2019

According to NYU, it has created a "global network university" with its primary campus, two "portal" campuses, and 12 academic sites. The portal campuses at NYU Shanghai and NYU Abu Dhabi function as full-fledged colleges, allowing students to study all four years of their undergraduate studies and receive a degree, never having set foot on NYU's traditional campus in New York. The academic sites at Accra, Berlin, Buenos Aires, Florence, London, Los Angeles, Madrid, Paris, Prague, Sydney, Tel Aviv, and Washington, D.C. function as study away sites, allowing students to spend up to a year away from their home campus. NYU, citing a report by the Institute of International Education, asserts that it has sent more students abroad and brought more international students in than any other university for five continuous years.

NYU Undergraduate Schools
College/school	Established
College of Arts and Science	1832
Tandon School of Engineering	1854
Steinhardt School of Culture, Education, and Human Development	1890
Stern School of Business	1900
School of Professional Studies	1934
Rory Meyers College of Nursing	1944
Silver School of Social Work	1960
Tisch School of the Arts	1965
Gallatin School of Individualized Study	1972
Global Liberal Studies	2009

The president of New York University is selected by the board of trustees and serves as the primary executive officer of the university for an unspecified term length. On July 1, 2023, Linda G. Mills became the 17th and current president of NYU.

=== Research ===
NYU is classified among "R1: Doctoral Universities – Very high research activity" and research expenditures totaled $917.7 million in 2017. The university was the founding institution of the American Chemical Society. The NYU Grossman School of Medicine received $305 million in external research funding from the National Institutes of Health in 2014. NYU was granted 90 patents in 2014, the 19th most of any institution in the world. NYU owns the fastest supercomputer in New York City. As of 2016, NYU hardware researchers and their collaborators enjoy the largest outside funding level for hardware security of any institution in the United States, including grants from the National Science Foundation (NSF), the Office of Naval Research, the Defense Advanced Research Projects Agency (DARPA), the United States Army Research Laboratory, the Air Force Research Laboratory, the Semiconductor Research Corporation, and companies including Twitter, Boeing, Microsoft, and Google.

In 2019, four NYU Arts & Science departments ranked in Top 10 of Shanghai Academic Ranking of World Universities by academic subjects (economics, politics, psychology, and sociology).

=== Rankings ===
Academic rankings

National
- Forbes: 49
- U.S. News & World Report: 32 (tie)
- Washington Monthly: 64
- WSJ/College Pulse: 273

Global
- ARWU: 31
- QS: 55
- THE: 33
- U.S. News & World Report: 32

2021 U.S. News & World Report rankings
Business	10
Economics	11
Education	6
Engineering	36
Law	5
Mathematics	9
Medicine: Primary Care	41
Medicine: Research	2
Nursing: Doctor of Nursing Practice	24
Nursing: Master's	12

Nationally, NYU is ranked 17th in the Center for World University Rankings, 9th by QS World University Rankings, 17th in the Academic Ranking of World Universities, 27th by Business Insider, and 25th by U.S. News & World Report.

Globally, NYU is ranked 23 in the Center for World University Rankings, 25th in the Academic Ranking of World Universities, 26th in the Times Higher Education World University Rankings, and 35th in the QS World University Rankings. Additionally, NYU is ranked 26th in the Times Higher Education World University Rankings Reputation Rankings.

U.S. News & World Report ranks NYU's graduate schools 6th for law, 10th for public policy, 9th for mathematics (1st for applied mathematics), 8th for Occupational therapy under Steinhardt School of Culture, Education, and Human Development, 10th for business, 11th for economics, 12th for political science, 4th for medical school research, 10th for education, 19th for nursing doctorate, 38th for physical therapy, 30th for computer science, 36th for psychology, and 38th for engineering.

Globally, NYU's social sciences are ranked 8th by the Academic Ranking of World Universities, 15th by the Times Higher Education World University Rankings, and 16th by the QS World University Rankings. NYU is globally ranked 11th for psychology by the QS World University Ranking. The Social Psychology Network ranks NYU 5th for industrial/organizational psychology, 14th for clinical psychology, and U.S. News & World Report ranks NYU 9th for social psychology and 9th for behavioral neuroscience.

U.S. News & World Report ranks the New York University School of Law 1st for tax law, 1st for international law, 1st for business and corporate law (tie), and 1st in criminal law. The publication also ranks The Robert F. Wagner Graduate School of Public Service 10th in public policy. The NYU Department of Philosophy is globally ranked 1st by The Philosophical Gourmet Report and the QS World University Rankings. The annual Global Employability Survey in The New York Times ranks NYU 11th nationally and 29th globally for employability. NYU ranks 19th in the world based on the number of patents generated.

Globally, NYU is ranked 7th by the Times Higher Education World University Rankings for producing alumni who are millionaires, 5th among universities with the highest number of alumni worth $30 million or more, and 4th by Wealth-X for producing ultra high net-worth and billionaire alumni.

== Student life ==
Student body composition as of May 2, 2022
Race and ethnicity	Total
Foreign national	24%
White	23%
Asian	19%
Hispanic	17%
Other (Note: Other consists of multiracial Americans & those who prefer to not say.)	9%
Black	8%
Economic diversity
Low-income (Note: The percentage of students who received an income-based federal Pell Grant intended for low-income students.)	19%
Affluent (Note: The percentage of students who are a part of the American middle class at the bare minimum.)	81%

=== Student government ===
The Student Government Assembly (SGA) is the governing student body at NYU. It consists of 75 voting members from subsidiary student government organs including the Student Senators Council (SSC) and the Presidents Council, who are elected from their respective individual undergraduate and graduate colleges.

The SGA has been involved in controversial debates on campus, including a campus-wide ban on the sale of The Coca-Cola Company's products in 2005 to protest its refusal to investigate apparent human rights violations at their Colombian bottling plant and the Graduate Student Organizing Committee unionization in 2001 and subsequent strike in 2005. The Coke ban was lifted by the University Senate on February 5, 2009.

In 2018, the structure of the university's student government was called into question by students through school newspapers and social media pages calling for "sweeping changes to its byzantine structure." Advocates claimed the structure of SGA failed to represent all students, wasted university funds and operated in an undemocratic manner. Opponents claimed that advocates were merely motivated by legislation supporting the BDS movement that was likely to pass.

=== Student organizations ===
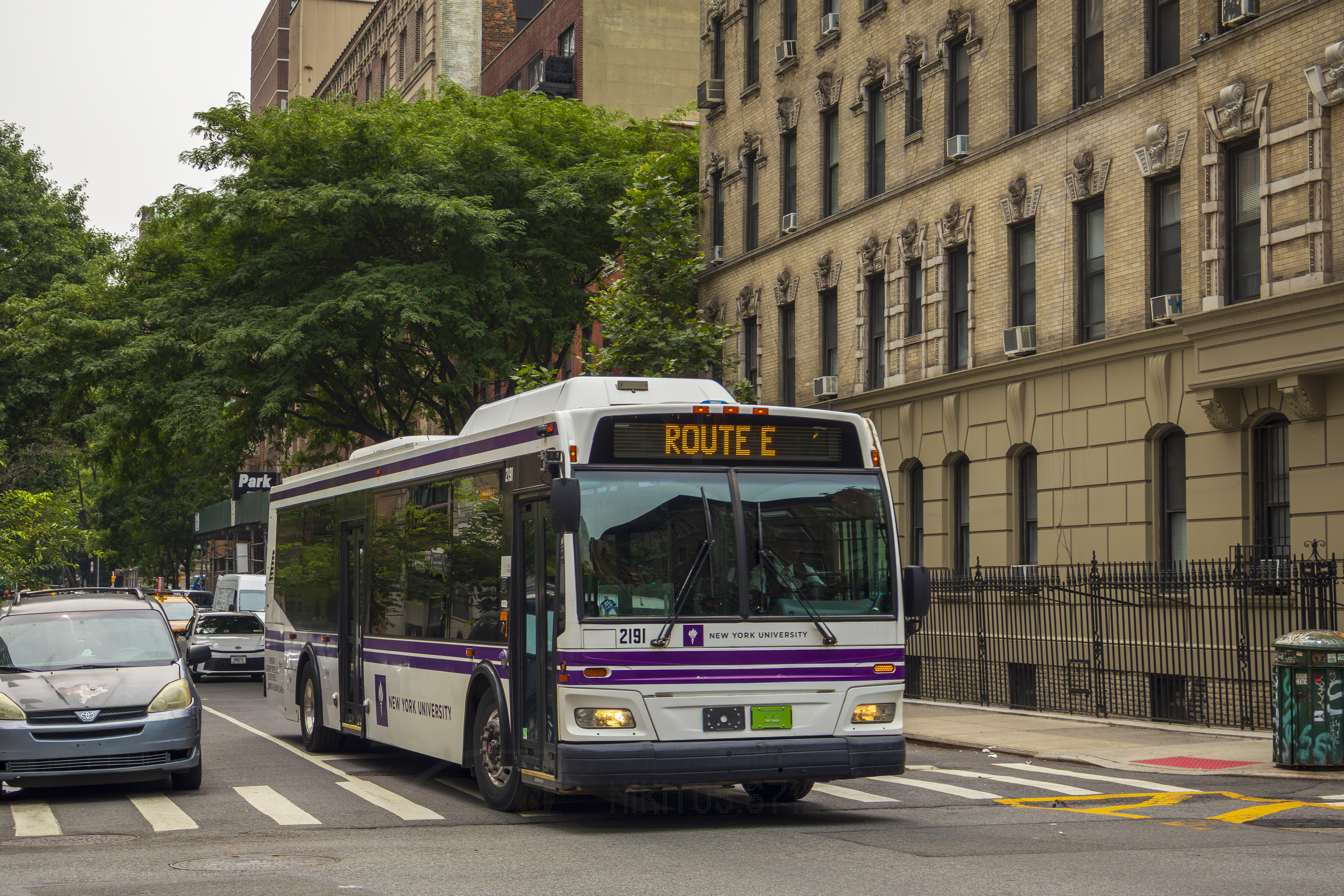
A bus system transports students to and from the far ends of campus.

NYU has over 450 student clubs and organizations on campus. In addition to the sports teams, fraternities, sororities, and study clubs, there are many organizations on campus that focus on entertainment, arts, and culture.

==== Journalism, media, and broadcast organizations ====
These organizations include various student media clubs: for instance, the daily student newspaper the Washington Square News, the NYU Local daily blog, The Plague comedy magazine, "Washington Square Local web-based satire news source, and the literary journals Washington Square Review and The Minetta Review, as well as student-run event producers such as the NYU Program Board and the Inter-Residence Hall Council. It also operates radio station WNYU-FM 89.1 with a diverse college radio format, transmitting to the entire New York metropolitan area from the original campus, and via booster station WNYU-FM1 which fills in the signal in lower Manhattan from atop one of the Silver Towers, next to the football field at the Washington Square campus.

Students publish a campus comedy magazine, The Plague. Like many college humor magazines, this often pokes fun at popular culture as well as campus life and the idiosyncrasies of New York University. The Plague was founded in 1978 by Howard Ostrowsky along with Amy Burns, John Rawlins, Joe Pinto and Dan Fiorella, and is currently published once per semester. It is not NYU's first humor magazine, as The Medley was a humor magazine published by the Eucleian Society from 1913 to 1950.

==== Debate team ====
Since winning the national championship in the 2003–2004 season, the NYU Cross Examination Debate Association (CEDA) debate team is considered one of the perennial collegiate policy debate teams in the country. For the 2020–21 season, they placed 5th in the nation at CEDA Open Nationals and 2nd in the nation at JV Nationals, along with students named the 1st and 4th place speakers at Novice Nationals. In 2021, they ranked 10th in the nation, finishing ahead of Harvard and Cornell. This marked 14 years of Top 20 National finishes dating back to the 2007 season.

==== Mock trial team ====
The New York University Mock Trial team is consistently ranked as one of the best collegiate mock trial teams in the country. NYU has qualified for the National Championship Tournament for 10 consecutive seasons and placed in the top 10 during each of those years. In the 2009–2010 season, NYU won the 26th National Championship Tournament in Memphis over rival Harvard. The following season, they qualified for the final round once more only to be the runners-up to UCLA. In the American Mock Trial Association's 2015–2016 power rankings, NYU ranks third, behind Harvard and Yale.

==== Campus traditions ====
NYU has traditions which have persisted across campuses. Since the beginning of the 20th century initiation ceremonies have welcomed incoming NYU freshmen. At the Bronx University Heights Campus, seniors used to grab unsuspecting freshmen, take them to a horse-watering trough, and then dunk them head-first into what was known colloquially as "the Fountain of Knowledge". This underground initiation took place until the 1970s. Today freshmen take part in university-sponsored activities during what is called "Welcome Week". In addition, throughout the year the university traditionally holds Apple Fest (an apple-themed country fest that began at the University Heights campus), the Violet Ball (a dance in the atrium of Bobst Library), Strawberry Fest (featuring New York City's longest strawberry shortcake), and the semi-annual midnight breakfast where Student Affairs administrators serve free breakfast to students before finals.

==== A cappella groups ====
NYU is home to a number of student-run a cappella groups, several of which compete regularly at the International Championship of Collegiate A Cappella (ICCA). Most notable of these groups is The NYU N'Harmonics, who won the ICCA title in 2019. In 2020, The A Cappella Archive ranked The NYU N'Harmonics at No. 6 among all ICCA-competing groups.

=== Greek life ===
Some of the first fraternities in the country were formed at NYU. Greek life first formed on the NYU campus in 1837 when Psi Upsilon chartered its Delta Chapter. The first fraternities at NYU were social ones. With their athletic, professional, intellectual, and service activities, later groups sought to attract students who also formed other groups. Since then, Greek letter organizations have proliferated to include 25 social fraternities and sororities. As of 2014, approximately 13% of NYU undergraduate students are members of fraternities or sororities.

Four governing boards oversee Greek life at the university. The Interfraternity Council (IFC) has jurisdiction over all twelve recognized fraternities on campus. Eight sororities are under the jurisdiction of the Panhellenic Council (PhC), which features seven national sororities (ΔΦΕ, ΑΕΦ, ΑΣΤ, ΠΒΦ, ΚΚΓ, ΖΤΑ, ΔΓ) and two local sororities (ΑΦΖ and ΘΦΒ). Five multicultural organizations maintain membership in the Multicultural Greek Council (MGC), including two fraternities and three sororities. All three of the aforementioned boards are managed under the auspices of the Inter-Greek Council.

Greek organizations have historical significance at NYU. Delta Phi Epsilon, Zeta Psi, Alpha Epsilon Pi, Tau Delta Phi, Alpha Kappa Psi and Delta Sigma Pi were founded at NYU. Zeta Psi was chartered in 1847, Delta Sigma Pi in 1907, Alpha Epsilon Pi in 1913 Delta Phi Epsilon was founded in 1917. The NYU Gamma chapter of Delta Phi, founded in 1841, is the longest continuously active fraternity chapter in the world, having never gone inactive since its establishment. Delta Phi is also the oldest continuously active fraternity in the United States, being the only organization in the original Union Triad to remain active since its institute. The NYU Gamma chapter of Zeta Beta Tau is the oldest active ΖΒΤ chapter in the country.

=== Secret societies ===
During the University Heights era, an apparent rift evolved with some organizations distancing themselves from students from the downtown schools. The exclusive Philomathean Society operated from 1832 to 1888 (formally giving way in 1907 and reconstituted into the Andiron Club). Included among the Andiron's regulations was "Rule No.11: Have no relations save the most casual and informal kind with the downtown schools." The Eucleian Society, rival to the Philomathean Society, was founded in 1832. The Knights of the Lamp was a social organization founded in 1914 at the School of Commerce. This organization met every full moon and had a glowworm as its mascot. The Red Dragon Society, founded in 1898, is thought to be the most selective society at NYU.

In addition, NYU's first yearbook was formed by fraternities and "secret societies" at the university. There have been several attempts to restart old societies by both former and incoming undergraduate classes.

=== ROTC ===
NYU does not have an ROTC program on campus. However, NYU students may participate in the U.S. Army ROTC program through NYC Army ROTC (Yankee Battalion), headquartered at Fordham University. Students may also participate in the U.S. Air Force ROTC program through AFROTC Detachment 560 headquartered at Manhattan College.

== Athletics ==
NYU's sports teams are referred to as the NYU Violets, the colors being the trademarked hue "NYU Violet" and white. Since 1981, the school mascot has been a bobcat, whose origin can be traced back to the abbreviation then being used by the Bobst Library computerized catalog—short: Bobcat. NYU's sports teams include baseball, men's and women's varsity basketball, cross country, fencing, golf, soccer, softball, swimming and diving, tennis, track and field, volleyball, and wrestling. Most of NYU's sports teams participate in the NCAA's Division III and the University Athletic Association, while fencing and ice hockey participate in Division I. While NYU has had All-American football players, the school has not had a varsity football team since 1952.

NYU students also compete in club and intramural sports, including badminton, baseball, basketball, crew, cycling, equestrianism, ice hockey, lacrosse, martial arts, rugby, softball, squash, tennis, triathlon, and ultimate. The Palladium Athletic Facility serves as the home base of NYU's Varsity and Club intercollegiate athletic teams, while NYU's 404 and Brooklyn athletic facilities offer additional space for the NYU fitness community. Many of NYU's varsity teams play their games at various facilities and fields throughout Manhattan because of the scarcity of space for playing fields near campus. NYU is currently in the process of building a new billion dollar flagship athletic facility known as 181 Mercer Street. When complete, the new home of NYU Athletics will host a six-lane swimming pool, four full basketball courts, a complete in-door running track and other sports related offerings.

== Notable alumni ==
Notable NYU alumni include:

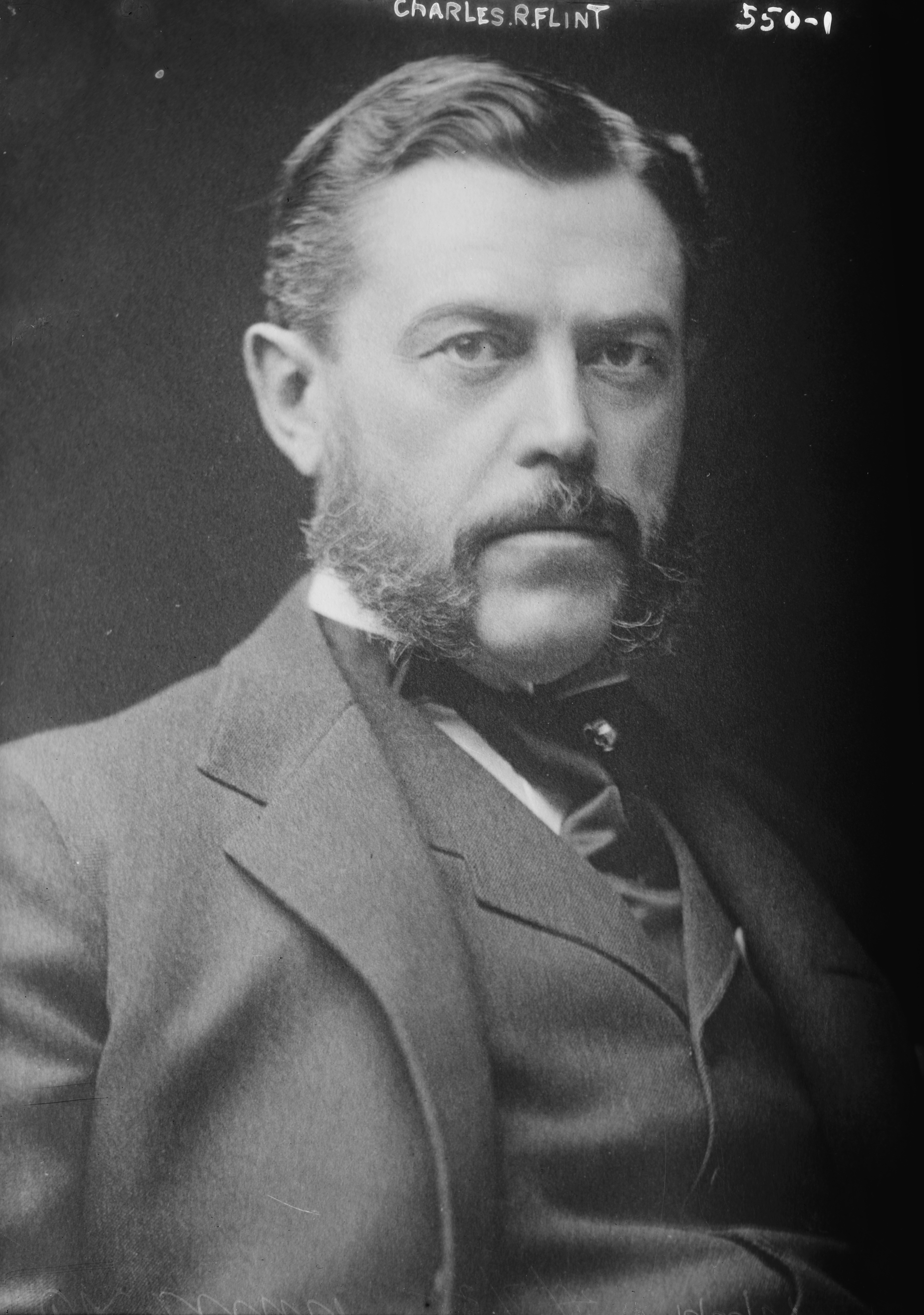
Charles Ranlett Flint (B.S. 1868)

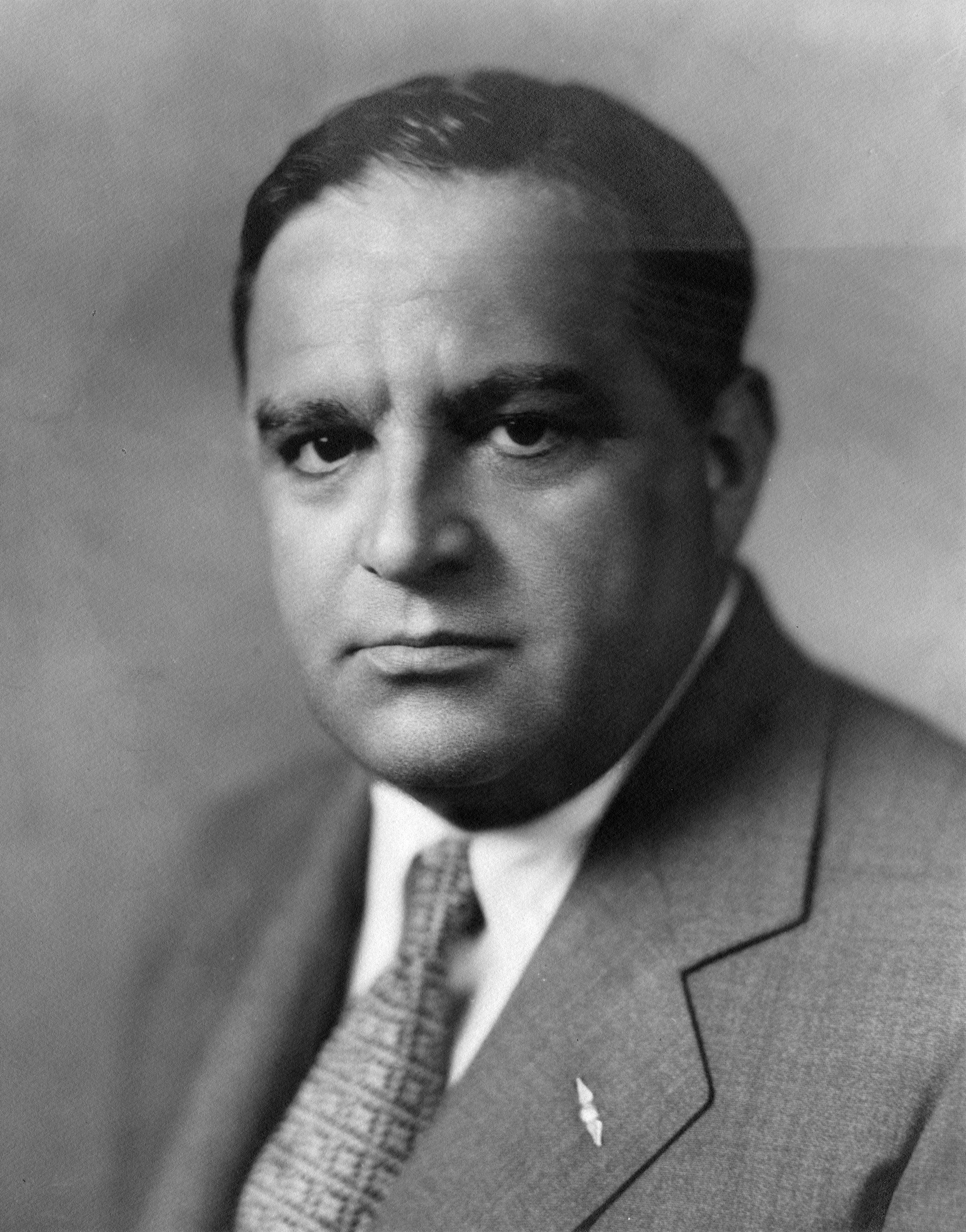
Fiorello La Guardia (L.L.B. 1910)

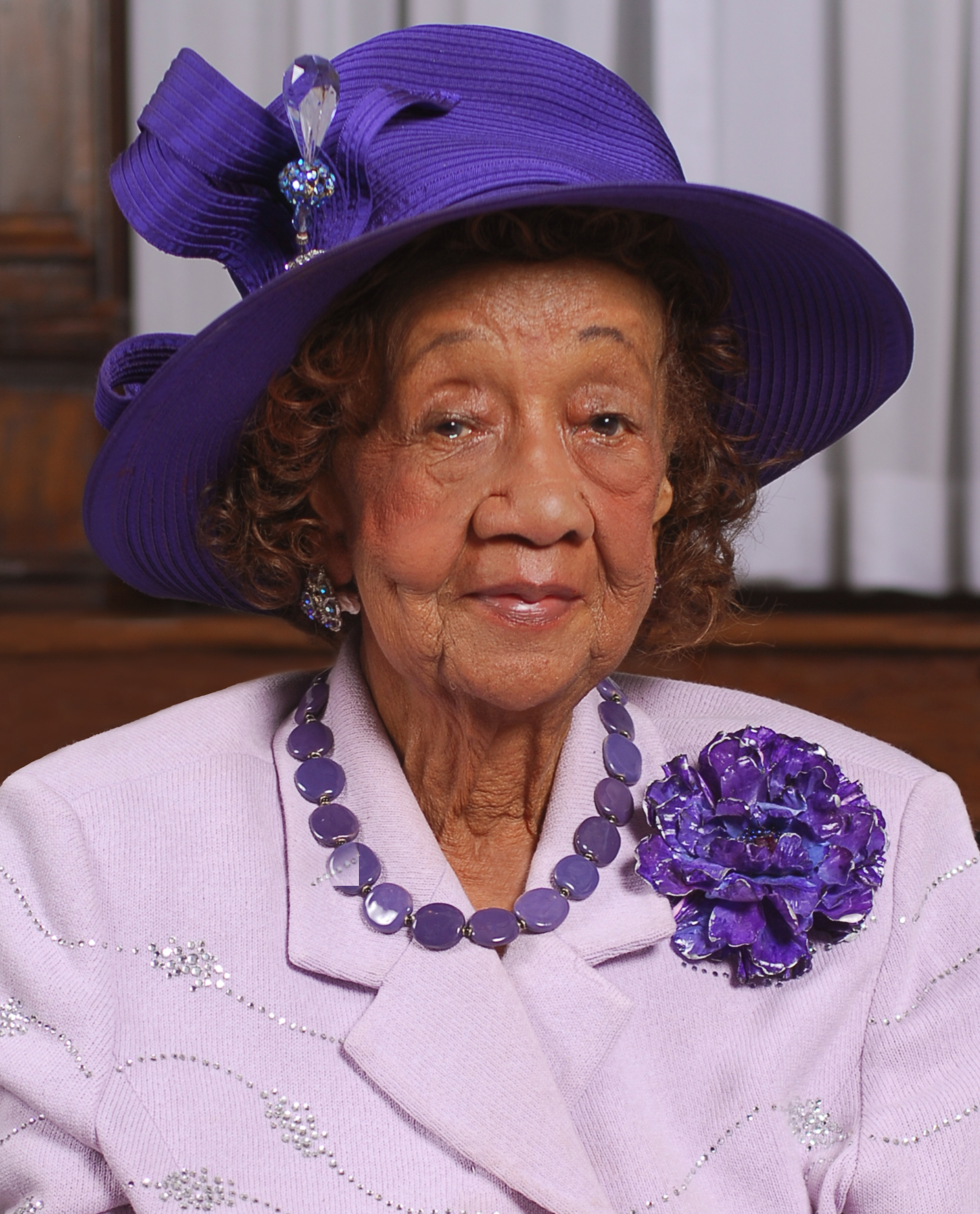
Dorothy Height (B.A. 1933, M.A. 1934)

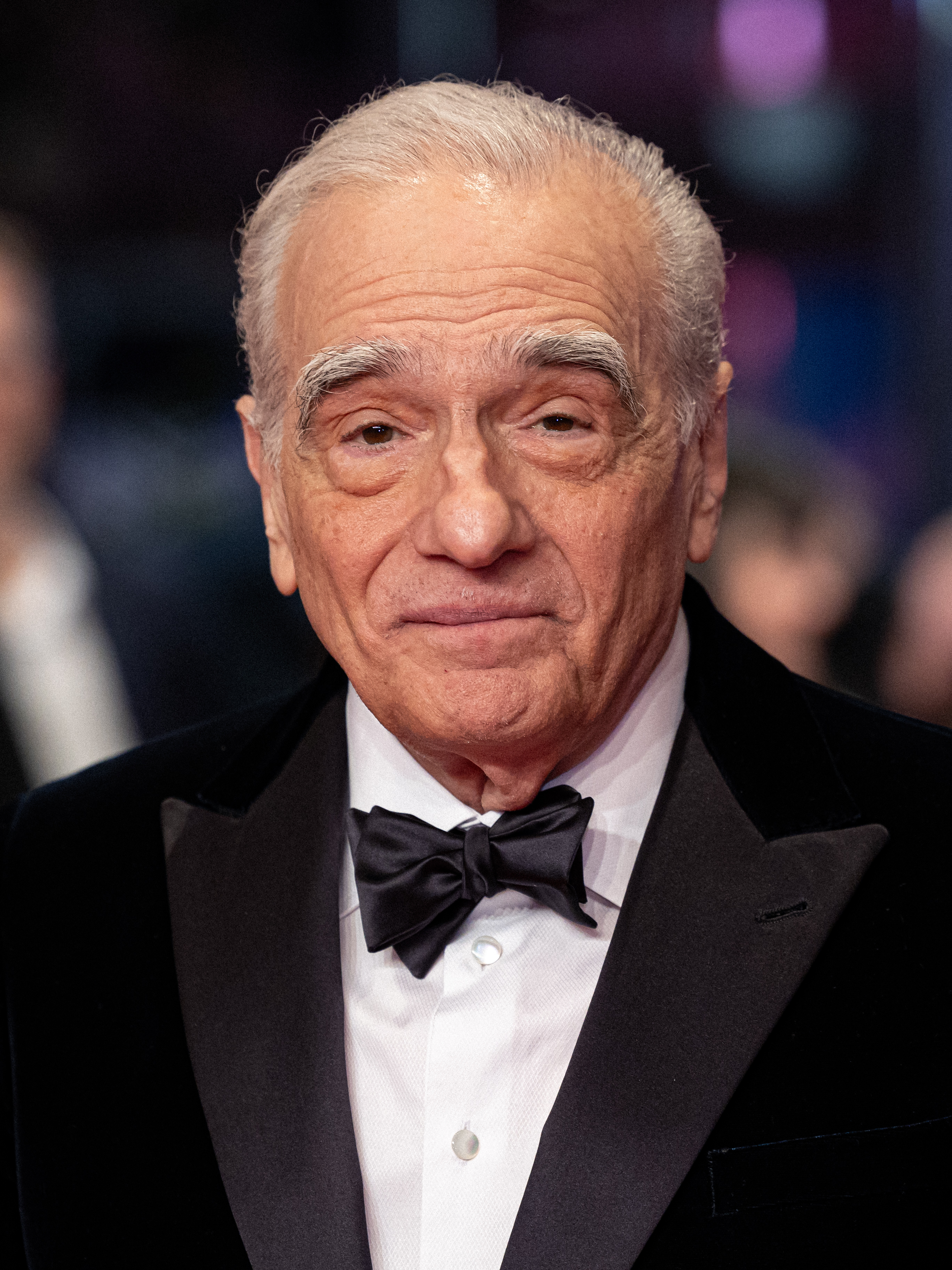
Martin Scorsese (B.A. 1964, M.A. 1968)

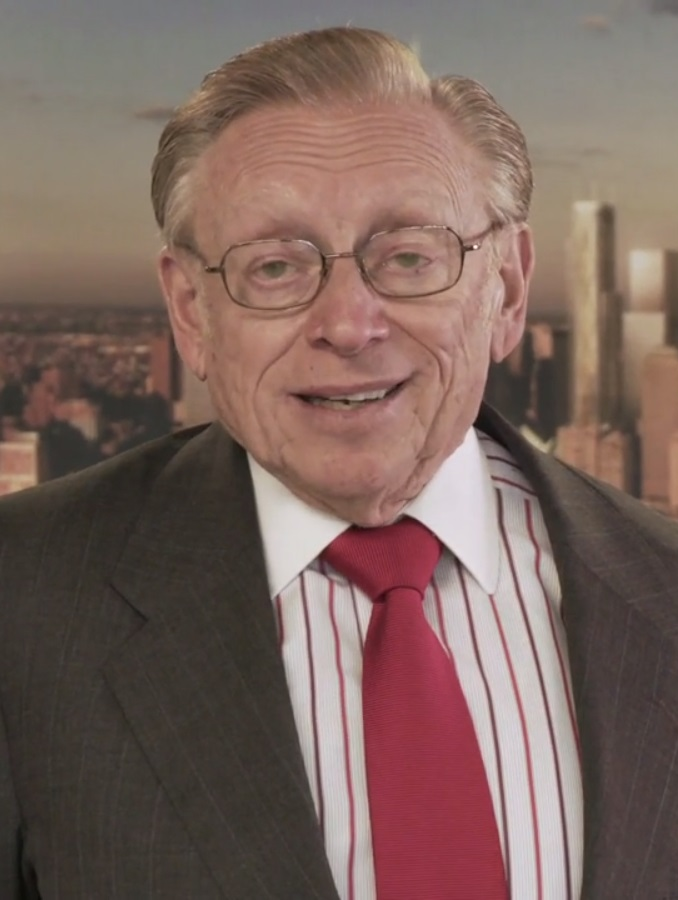
Larry Silverstein (B.A. 1952)

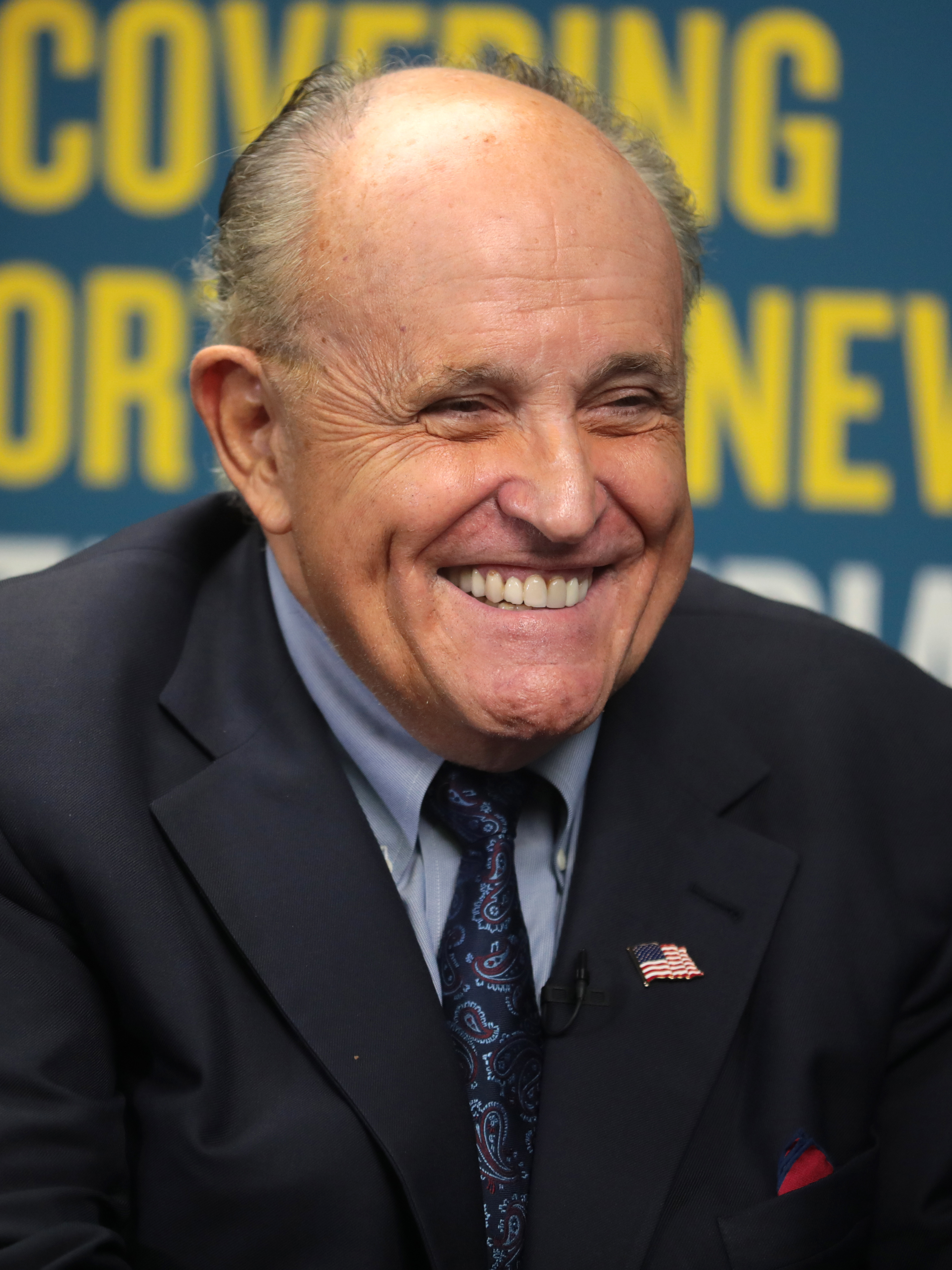
Rudy Giuliani, (J.D. 1968)

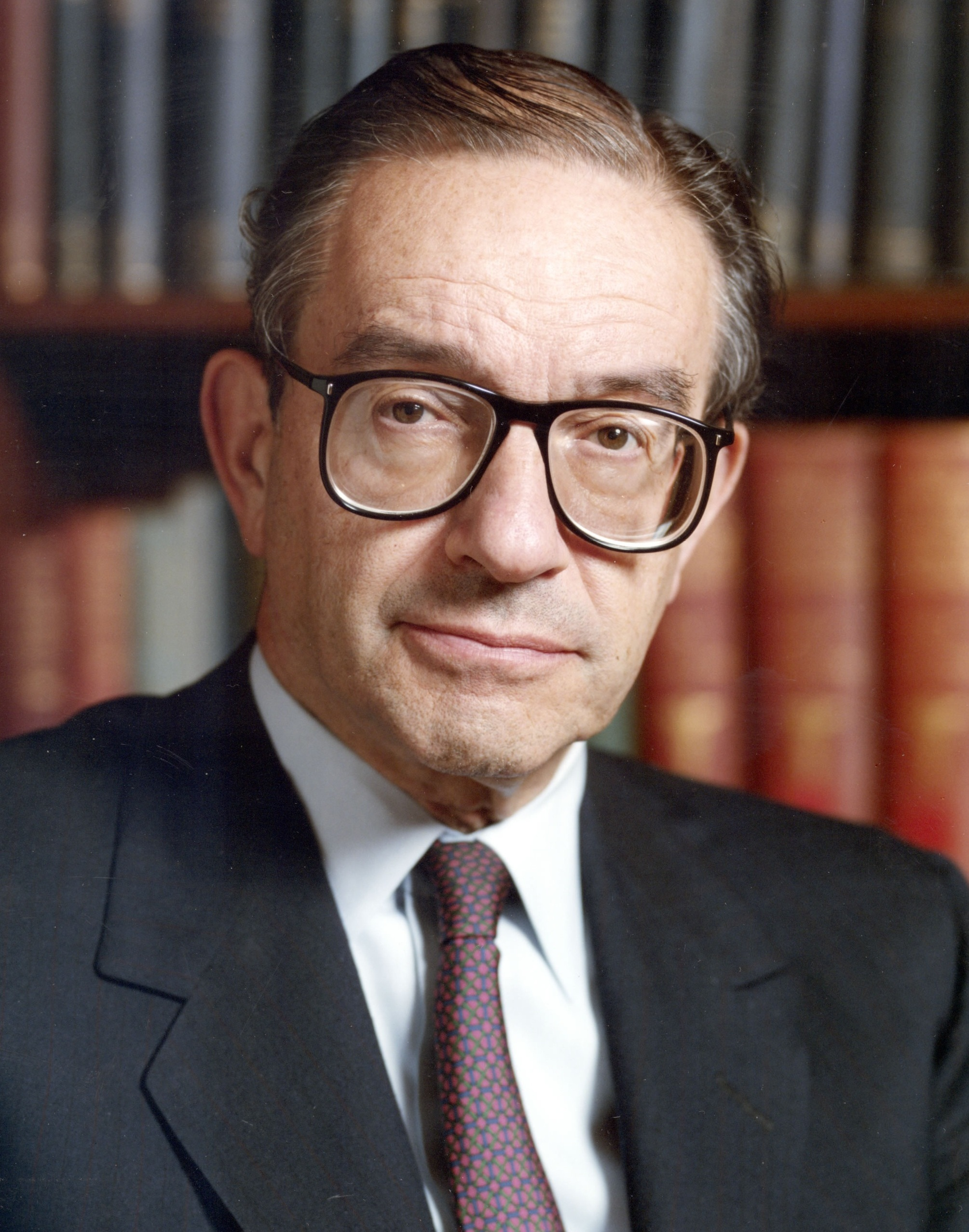
Alan Greenspan (B.A. 1948, M.A. 1950, Ph.D. 1977)

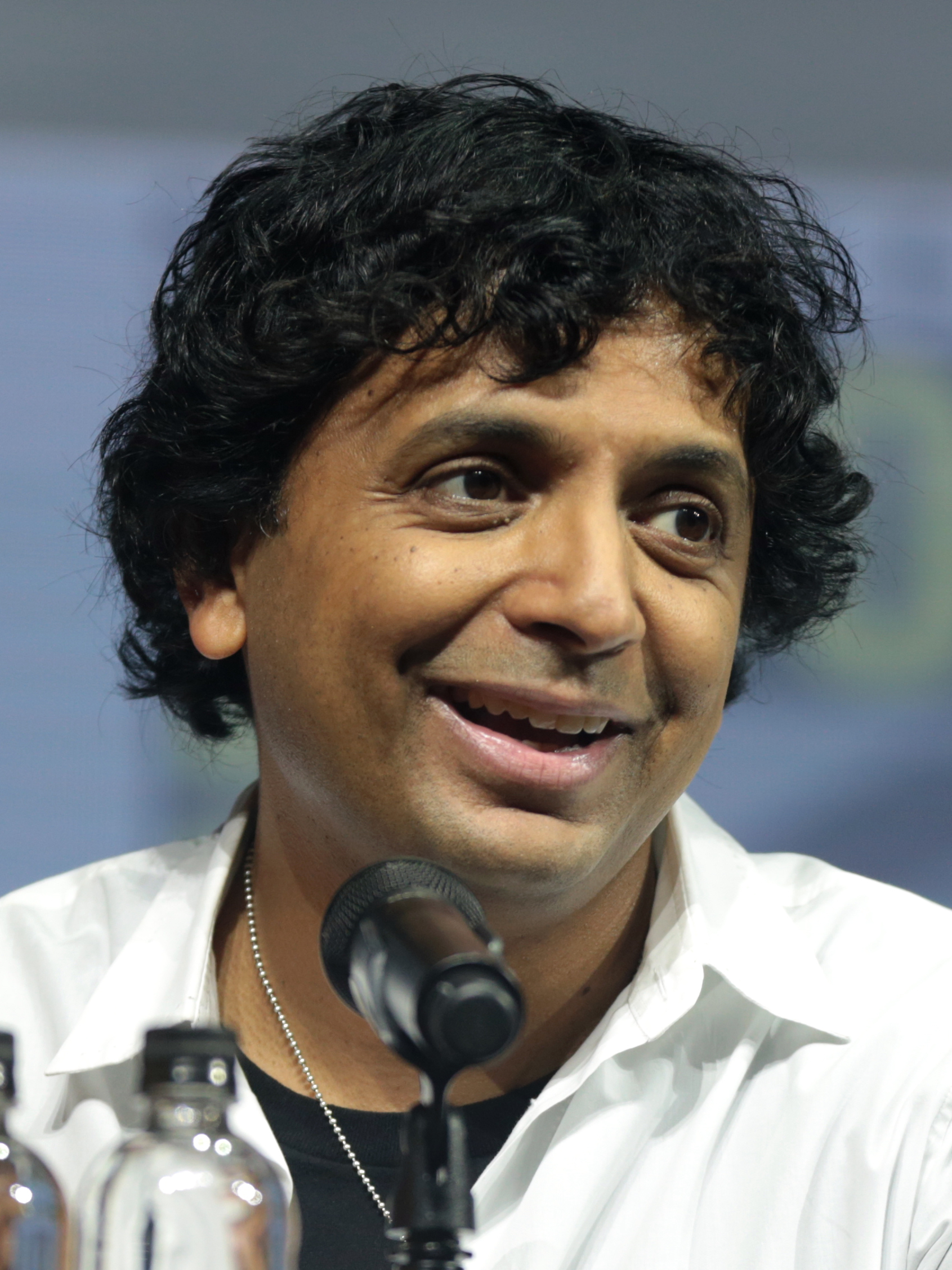
M. Night Shyamalan (B.A. 1982)

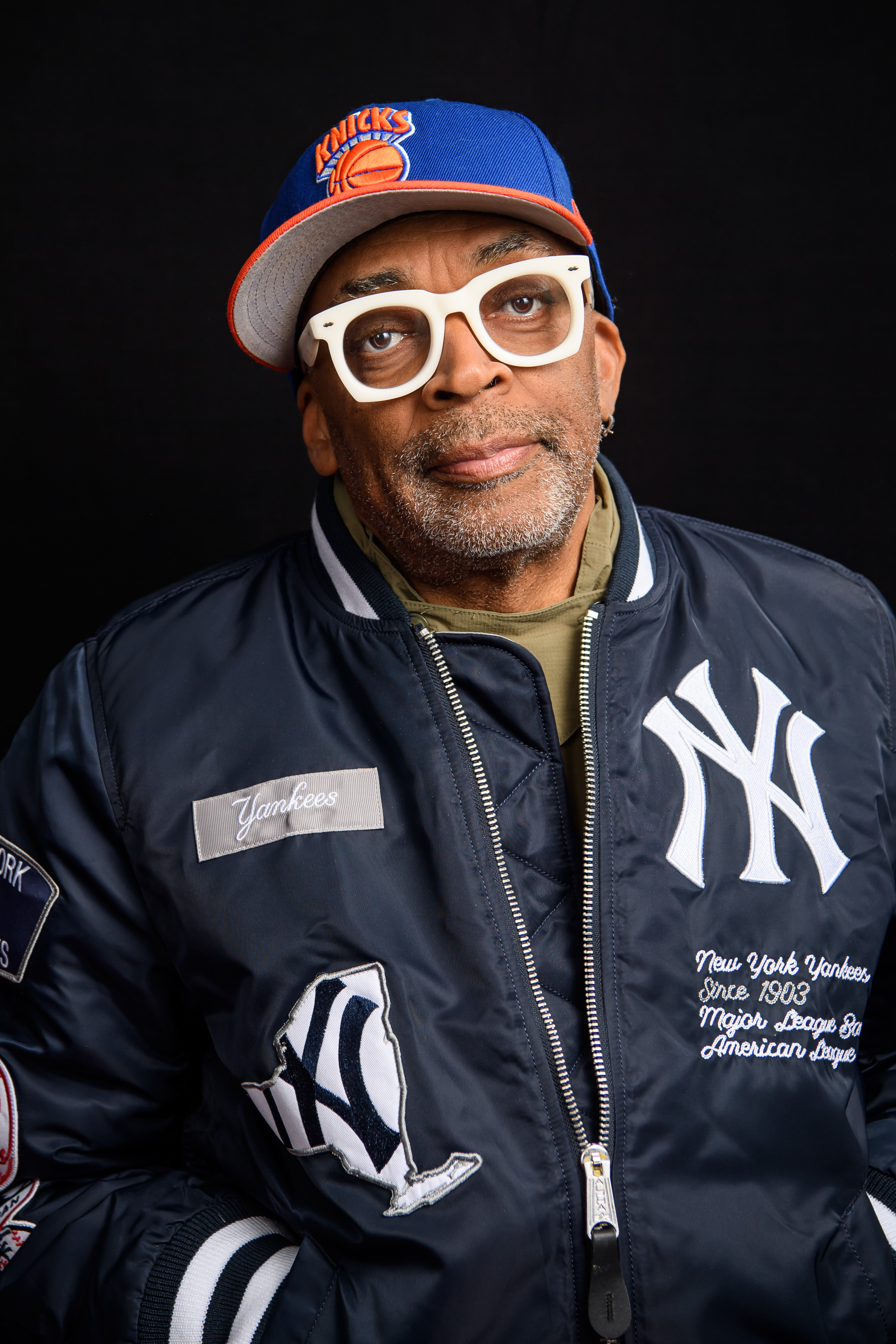
Spike Lee (M.F.A. 1982)

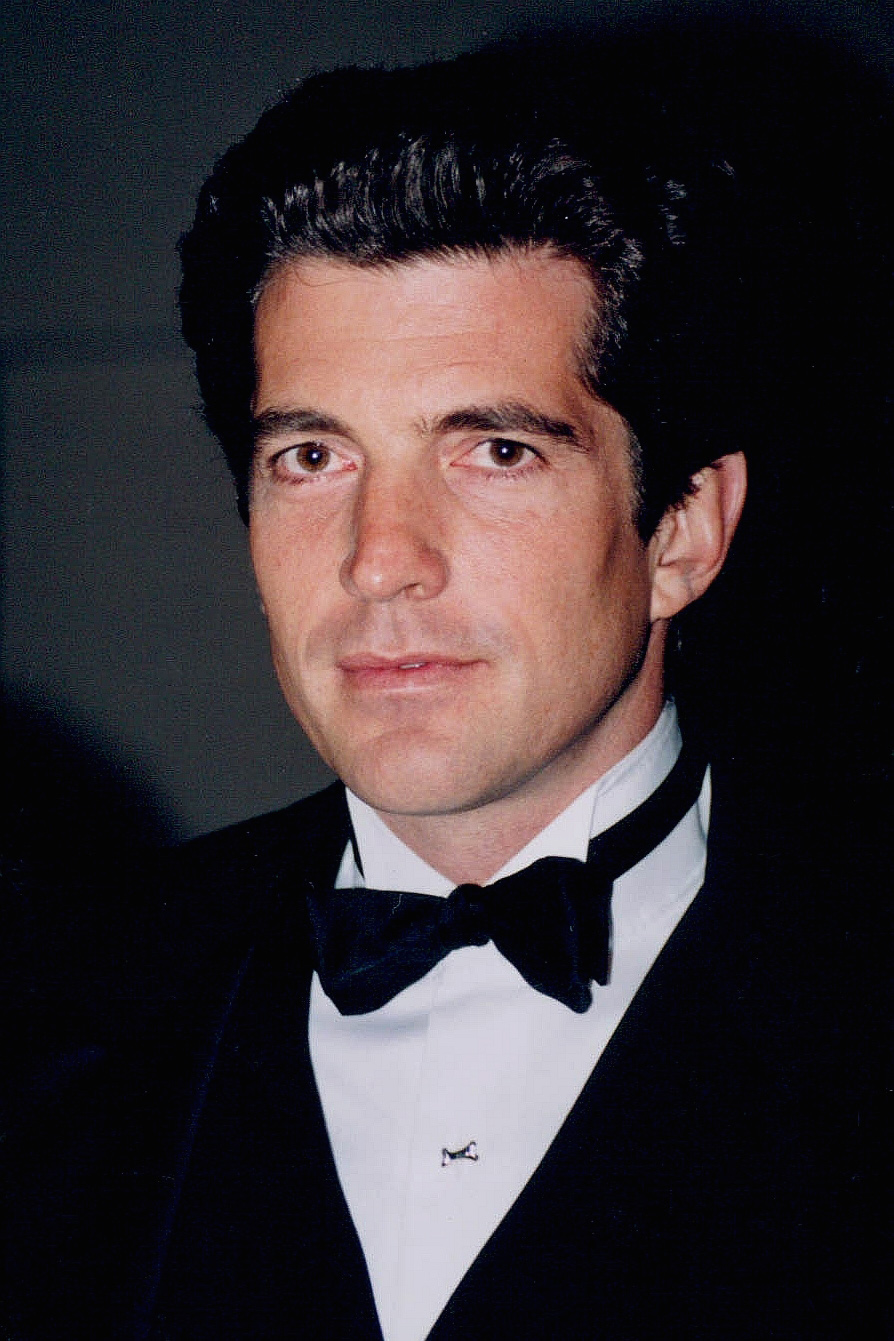
John F. Kennedy Jr. (J.D. 1989)

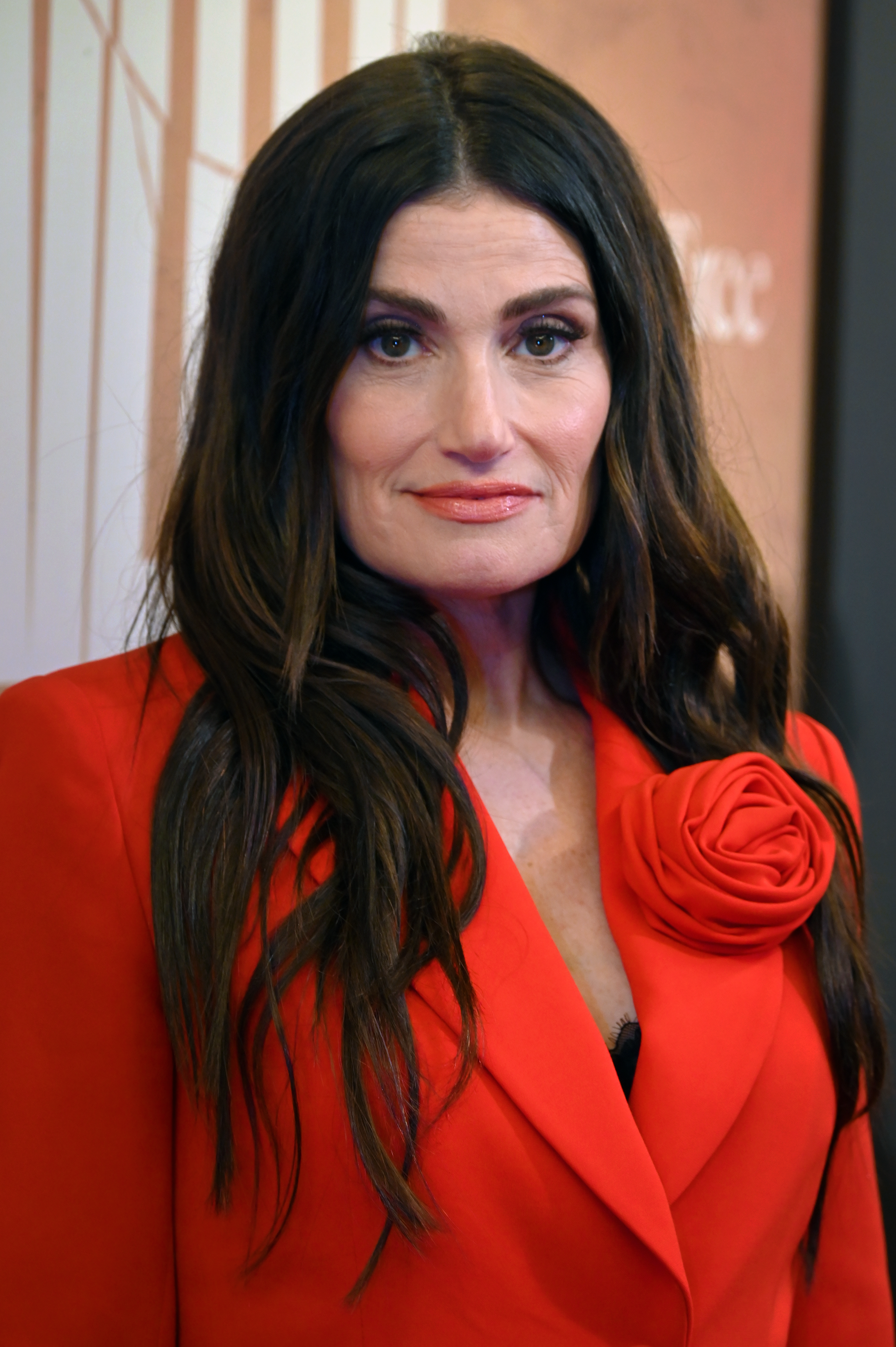
Idina Menzel (B.F.A. 1992)

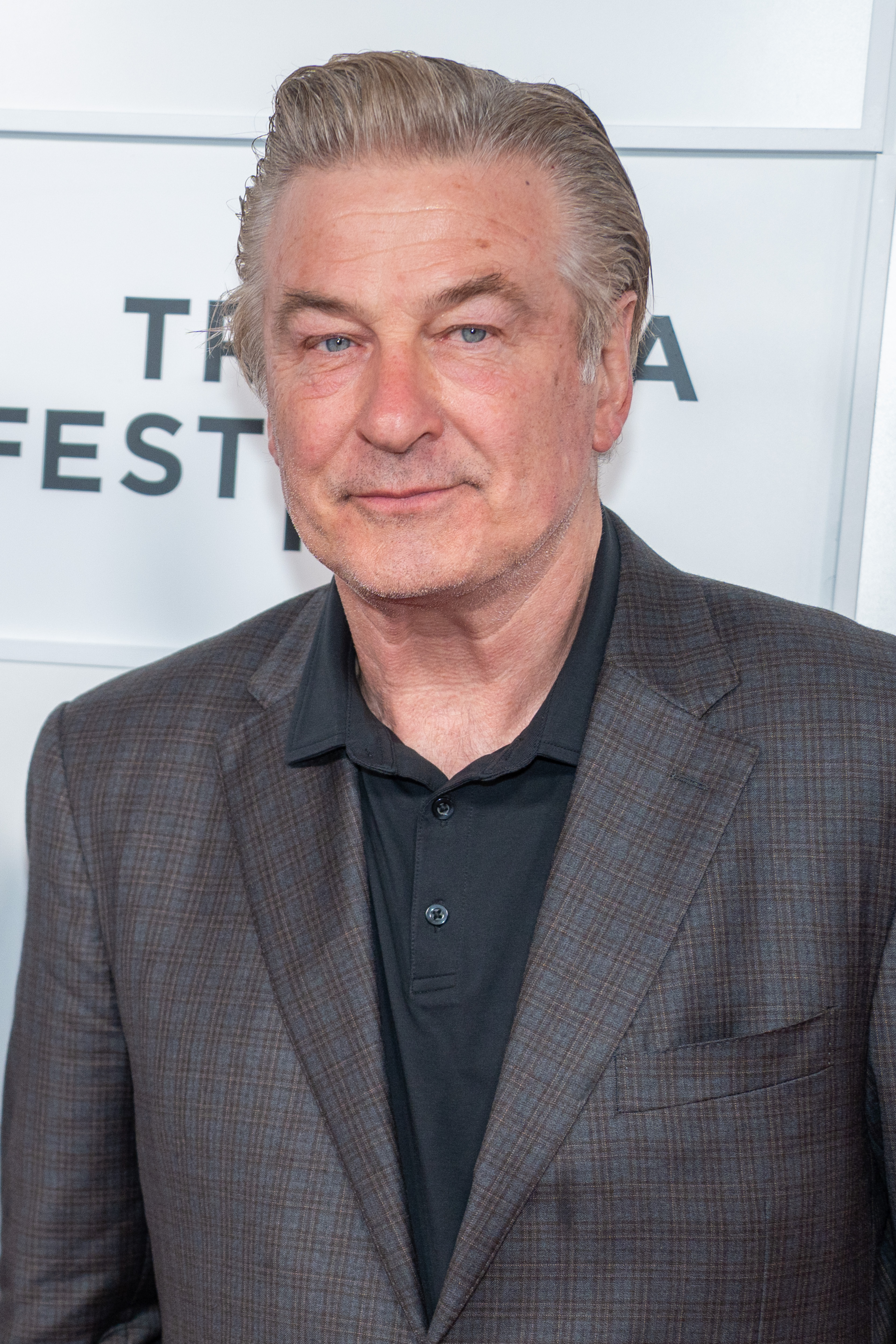
Alec Baldwin (B.F.A. 1994)

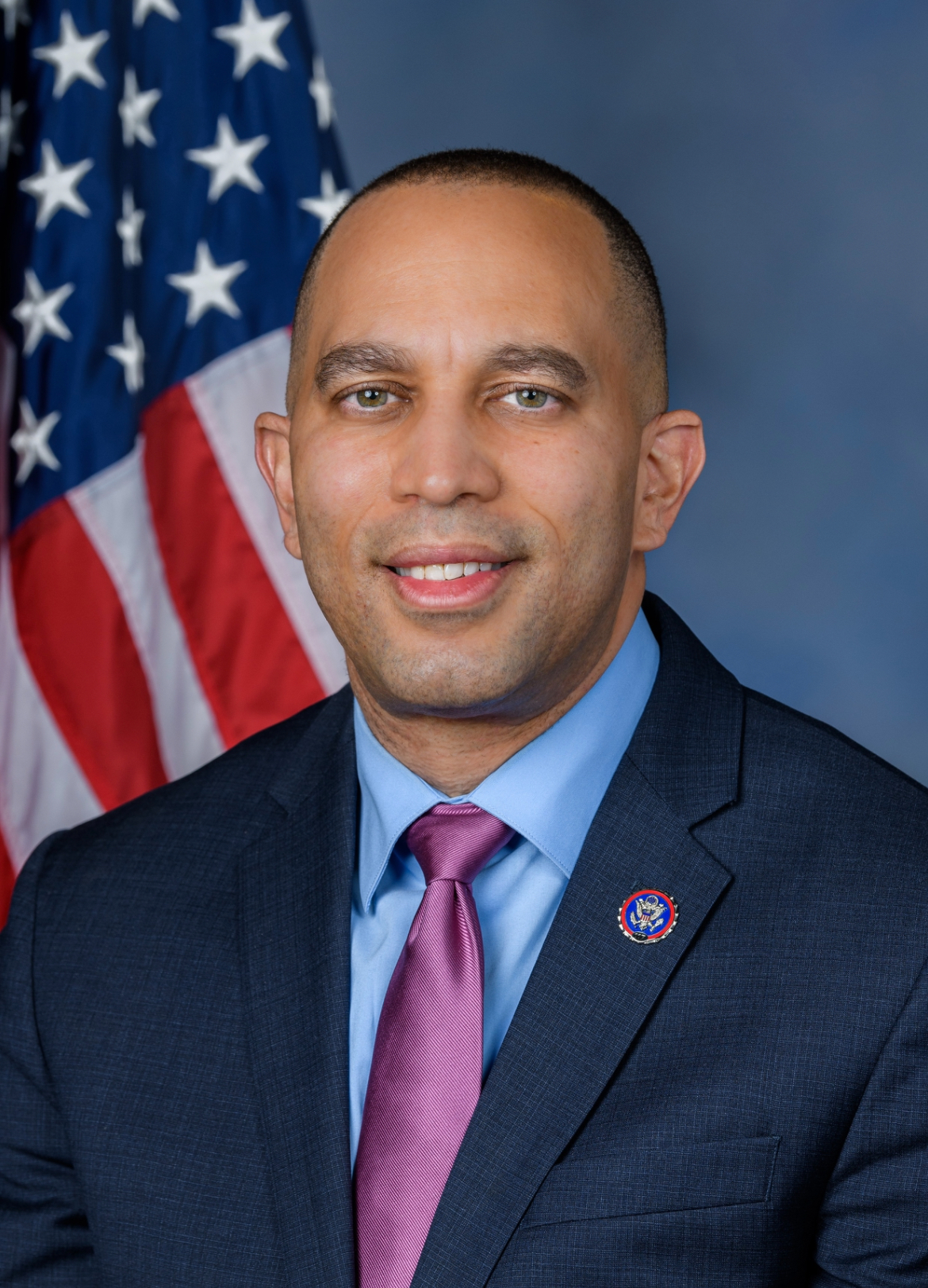
Hakeem Jeffries (J.D. 1996)

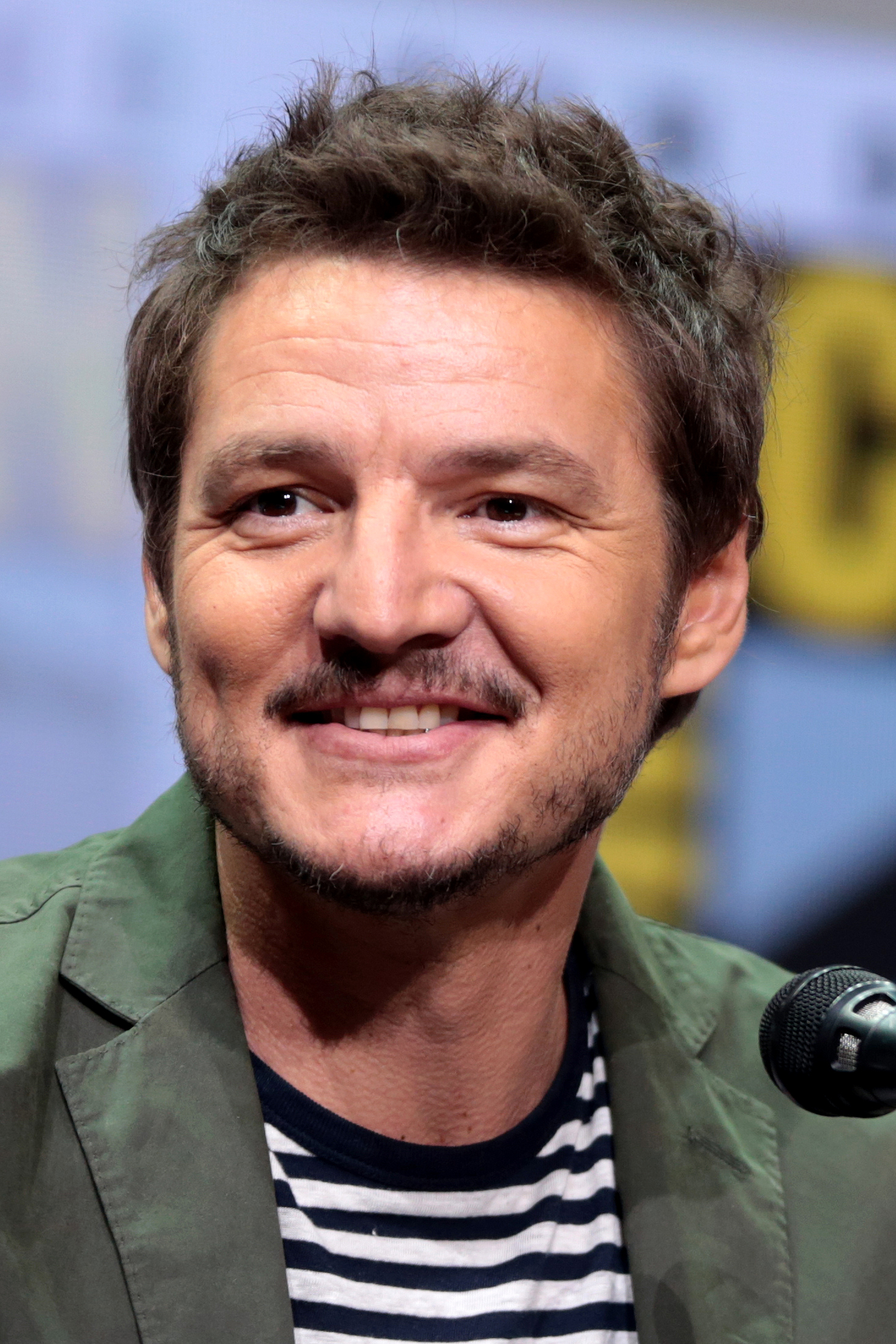
Pedro Pascal (B.F.A. 1997)

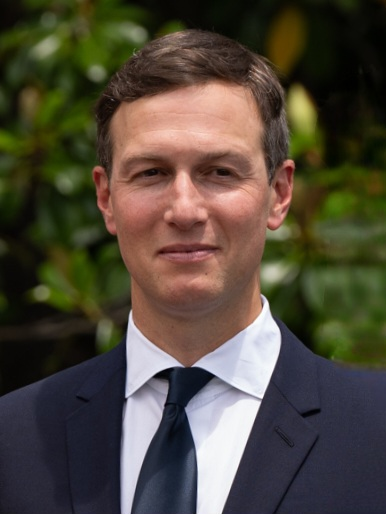
Jared Kushner (J.D., M.B.A. 2007)

As of 2020, multiple heads of state, royalty, one U.S. Supreme Court justice, five U.S. governors, 17 billionaires, eight Turing Award winners, five Fields Medalists, 31 MacArthur Fellows, 167 Guggenheim Fellows, three astronauts, seven Abel Prize winners, seven Lasker Award winners, a Crafoord Prize winner, 26 Pulitzer Prize winners, 37 Academy Award winners, 30 Emmy Award winners, 25 Tony Award winners, 12 Grammy Award winners, multiple Forbes 30 under 30 and Time 100 notables, and numerous members of the National Academies of Sciences, American Academy of Arts and Sciences, United States Congress, and U.S. diplomats have been affiliated with faculty or alumni. Multiple Rhodes Scholars, Marshall Scholars, Schwarzman Scholars and a Mitchell Scholar are affiliated with the university, with NYU Abu Dhabi producing more Rhodes Scholars per capita than any university in the world in the 2010s decade.

NYU has more than 500,000 living alumni as of 2015. As of October 2020, 38 Nobel Prize winners are affiliated with NYU. The university is also associated with a great number of important inventions and discoveries, such as cardiac defibrillator and artificial cardiac pacemaker (Barouh Berkovits), closed-chest cardiac defibrillator (William B. Kouwenhoven), laser (Gordon Gould), atom bomb (Frederick Reines), polio vaccine (Albert Sabin), RFID (Mario Cardullo), telephone handset (Robert G. Brown), wireless microphone (Hung-Chang Lin), first digital image scanner (Russell A. Kirsch), television (Benjamin Adler), light beer (Joseph Owades), non-stick cookware (John Gilbert), black hole thermodynamics (Jacob Bekenstein), polymer science (Herman Francis Mark), microwave (Ernst Weber), X-ray crystallography (Paul Peter Ewald), barcode (Jerome Swartz), structure of the DNA (Francis Crick), tau lepton (Martin Lewis Perl), processes for creating food coloring, decaffeination and sugar substitute (Torunn Atteraas Garin), processes for the mass production of penicillin (Jasper H. Kane), X-ray generator and rotational radiation therapy (John G. Trump), nuclear reactor and hydrogen bomb (John Archibald Wheeler), and contact lenses (Norman Gaylord). Alumnus Fred Waller who invented Cinerama and the Waller Gunnery Trainer, also obtained the first patent for a water ski.

Some of the most prolific inventors in American history are NYU alumni, such as Jerome H. Lemelson whose 605 patents included the cordless telephone, fax machine, videocassette recorder, and camcorder; Samuel Ruben, whose inventions include the electric battery; James Wood, who invented the cable-lift elevator, fabricated the steel cables for the Brooklyn Bridge, and contributed to the development of lockmaking, submarine, electric generator, electric motor, transformer, and refrigerator; and Albert Macovski, whose innovations include the single-tube color camera and real-time phased array imaging for ultrasound. NYU is the birthplace of the tractor beam and 5G. Before and during World War II, NYU's Tandon School of Engineering worked on problems whose solution led to the development of radar, and later broke ground in electromagnetic theory, electronics in general, and solved re-entry problems of the crewed space capsules, as well as helped develop and design the NASDAQ Automated Quote System and trading floors. Developer of the early telephone systems in the United States Bancroft Gherardi Jr., developer of the submarine communications facilities Jack M. Sipress, inventor of Italy's first computer Mario Tchou, designer of the Panama Canal locks Henry C. Goldmark, designer of the Pentagon Hugh John Casey, designer of the Apollo Lunar Module Thomas J. Kelly, as well as the designer of virtually every major bridge in New York City from the George Washington to the Verrazzano, Leopold Just, are also NYU alumni.

Many of the world's most renowned companies, such as IBM (Charles Ranlett Flint), Twitter (Jack Dorsey), Bloomberg L.P. (Charles Zegar), Jacobs Engineering Group (Joseph J. Jacobs), Hudson Group (Robert B. Cohen), MTV (Tom Freston), Barnes & Noble (Leonard Riggio), Northrop Grumman (William T. Schwendler), Automatic Data Processing (Henry Taub), Duracell (Samuel Ruben), Bugle Boy (William C. W. Mow), Virgin Mobile USA (Dan Schulman), among many others, were founded or co-founded by NYU alumni. Many of the world's most famous companies were either owned or led by NYU alumni. These include, Lockheed Martin (Robert J. Stevens), Xerox (Ursula Burns), Yahoo! (Alfred Amoroso), TPV Technology (Jason Hsuan), 20th Century Fox (Marvin Davis), BAE Systems Inc (Mark Ronald), AECOM (John Dionisio), Pfizer (John Elmer McKeen), Ingersoll Rand (Herbert L. Henkel), General Motors (Alfred P. Sloan), and Sears (Arthur C. Martinez).

Others include The New York Times (Spencer Trask), Stanley Black & Decker (John Trani), American International Group (Harvey Golub), American Express (Edward P. Gilligan), Qwest (Joseph Nacchio), Chase Bank (Walter V. Shipley), CBS (Laurence Alan Tisch), Bristol-Myers Squibb Company (Charles A. Heimbold, Jr.), Citigroup (Robert I. Lipp), Morgan Stanley (Robert A. Kindler), Marvel Entertainment (John Turitzin), ConocoPhillips (John Carrig), Deloitte (Barry Salzberg), Sony Pictures Entertainment (Peter Guber), GQ (Steven Florio), Viacom (Thomas E. Dooley), Liberty Media (John C. Malone), Verizon (Lawrence Babbio Jr.) and Chemtura (Vincent A. Calarco). A pioneer of Silicon Valley, Eugene Kleiner, and the World Trade Center site owner, Larry Silverstein, are also alumni.

== See also ==
- Silicon Alley
