= Student Senators Council of New York University =

Chief student deliberative body of New York University

The Student Senators Council is the chief student deliberative body of New York University representing all students from the 15 schools, colleges, and divisions, including undergraduate, graduate, professional, and non-degree students. The council, commonly known on campus as the SSC, considers matters in which the interests, rights, or responsibilities of students are involved and brings concerns to the attention of the NYU administration and to the University Senate.

== Structure ==
Student government at NYU begins at the school level. Each school or college has its own student council. Student council presidents come together with the elected and appointed Student Senators from each school to form the SSC's largest committee, University Committee on Student Life, which makes recommendations to the Student Senators Council.

The SSC is made up of 23 Student Senators elected by the students of the various schools and colleges of NYU and 12 Student Senators appointed at-large by the Executive Committee of the University Senate with the advice and consent of the elected Student Senators.

The executive committee of the SSC and UCSL consists of the SSC Vice Chairperson, the UCSL Vice Chairperson, the Global Vice Chairperson, and the SSC/UCSL Chairperson elected. The executive committee is elected by the 23 elected Student Senators for a one-year term at the last SSC meeting of the academic year.

In 2017, as directed by student body president Juan Calero, the Student Senators Council was vastly reformed along with the rest of NYU's student governance system. The chief body would now become the Student Government Assembly (SGA), open to the public and tasked with primary deliberations of the broader student body. Additionally, a Presidents Council was created to represent the particular interests of NYU's various individual school presidents, who were particularly less powerful under the former system. The SSC still exists, although it was removed from its position as chief deliberative body into a more parallel role with the newly minted Presidents Council.

== Notable Events ==
During the Fall of 2001, SSC's UCSL coordinated a "We Stand Together" campaign that raised over $52,000 to benefit families of fallen firefighters from September 11, 2001 attacks. The SSC was also involved in the Graduate Student Organizing Committee unionization in 2001 and subsequent strike in 2005.

On November 3, 2005 the University Senate, based on a recommendation from the SSC's UCSL, passed a resolution for a campus-wide ban on the sale of products produced by the Coca-Cola Company. This ban was subsequently lifted in Spring 2009.
