= NYU London =

UK academic institution

Coordinates: 51.513°N 0.115°W

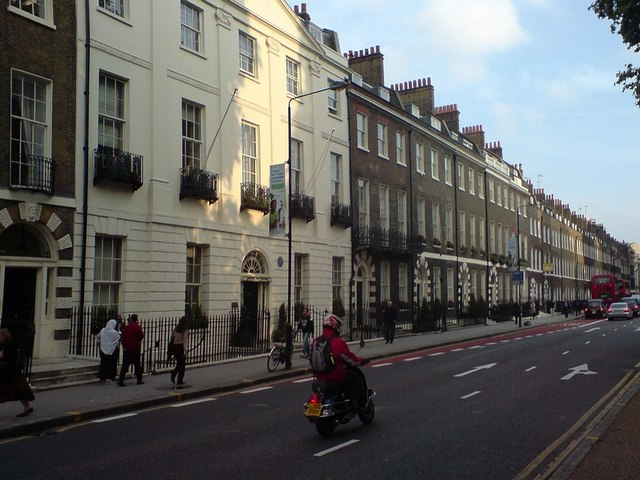
- Motto: Perstare et praestare
- Type: Private
- Location: London, United Kingdom
- Colors: Mayfair violet
- Website: www.nyu.edu/london

NYU London is an academic centre of New York University located in London, United Kingdom. It is one of NYU's 14 global academic centres, and the largest of these which does not grant its own degrees, hosting around 600 students each semester.

== Campus ==
The NYU London campus is located at 265 Strand in Central London, next to the London School of Economics. The centre was previously located at 4–6 Bedford Square in Bloomsbury, London, between 1999 and 2024. The residence halls are also located in Bloomsbury, near Russell Square.

The university's main building, No. 6, was formerly home to the Oxford and Cambridge Musical Club between 1914 and 1940. A centennial concert was held in 2014. The building has a blue plaque commemorating another former resident, Lord Eldon.

== Academic programs ==
NYU London hosts students from New York University's three degree-granting campuses in New York City, Abu Dhabi, and Shanghai, as well as study-abroad students from its partner universities in the United States.

Select first-year students in the NYU Liberal Studies core program and Global Liberal Studies program may spend their first year of studies at NYU London rather than at NYU's campus in New York City. There is also a program that sends students from the Stern School of Business, and the Steinhardt Music Business and Media, Culture, and Communications programmes.
