= NYU Florence =

Florence, Italy outpost of New York University

- Motto: Perstare Et Praestare
- Type: Private
- Established: 1994
- Location: Florence, Italy
- Colors: Mayfair Violet
- Website: www.nyu.edu/florence

NYU Florence is an academic centre of New York University located at Villa La Pietra, near Florence, Italy. It is one of NYU's 14 global academic centers.

== Campus ==
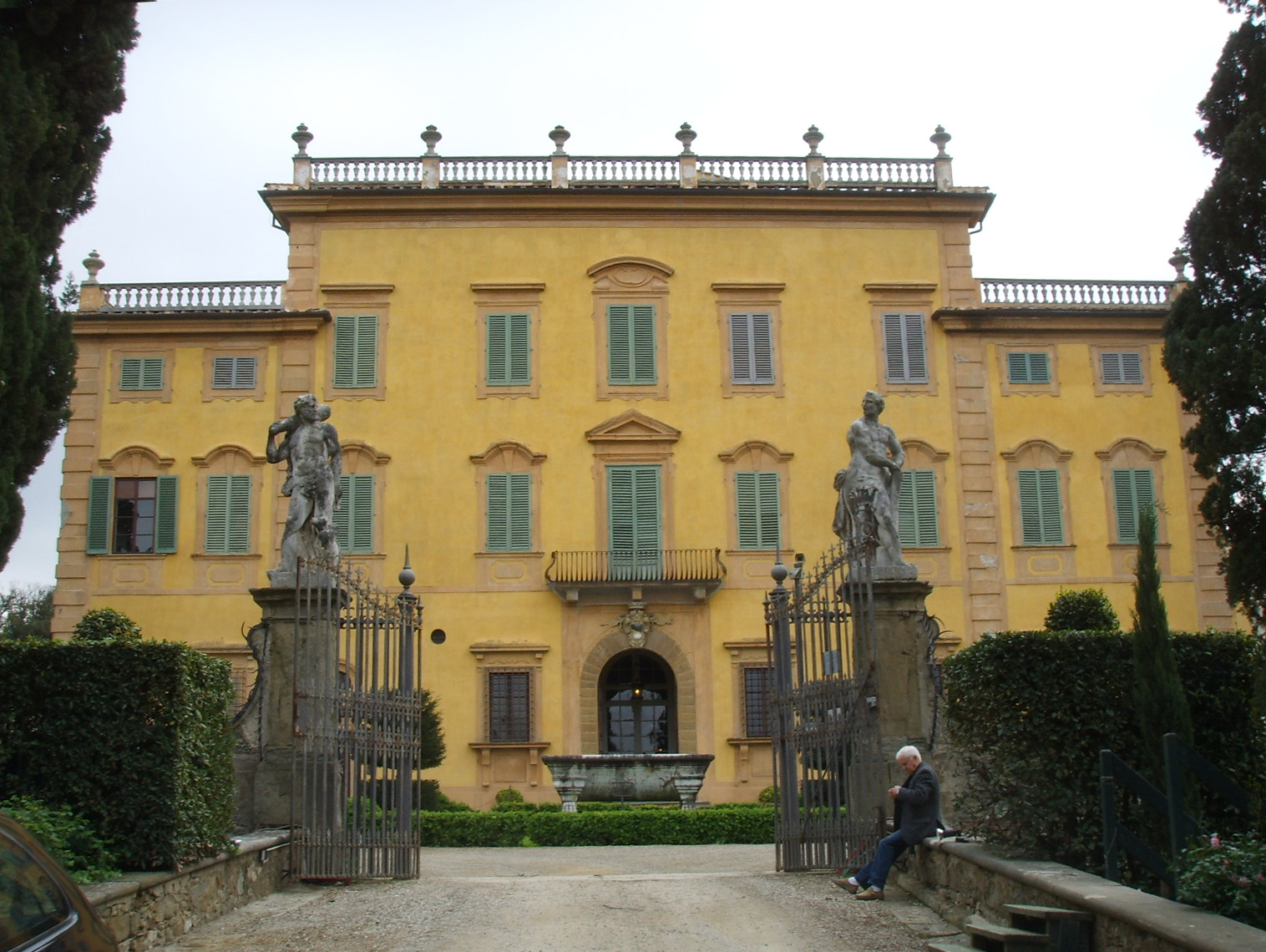
Villa La Pietra

In 1994, Villa La Pietra was bequeathed to New York University by Sir Harold Acton. Natalia and Colletta are the two campus villas dedicated to student housing. On-campus housing is traditional dormitory-style living with standard bedrooms, en-suite or hallway bathrooms, and lounge facilities. Villa Natalia has computer stations and exercise room to which all students have access.

== Academic programs ==
NYU Florence hosts students from New York University's three degree-granting campuses in New York City, Abu Dhabi, and Shanghai, as well as study-abroad students from its partner universities in the United States.

Select first-year students in the NYU Liberal Studies core program and Global Liberal Studies program may spend their first year of studies at NYU Florence rather than at NYU's campus in New York City.

== La Pietra Dialogues ==
NYU Florence hosts ongoing conferences on contemporary issues concerning politics, culture, and economics in the La Pietra Dialogues.
