= NYU Liberal Studies =

School within New York University

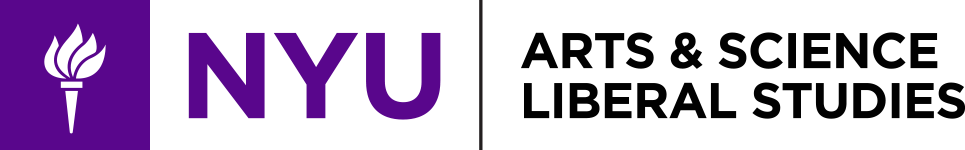
- Type: Private
- Established: 2009
- Parent institution: New York University
- Dean: Julie Mostov
- Location: New York City, New York, United States of America
- Colors: Mayfair Violet
- Website: www.liberalstudies.nyu.edu

Liberal Studies is a school in the Faculty of Arts and Science at the New York University. It houses the Liberal Studies Core Program and the Global Liberal Studies bachelor's degree program. Both of the department's programs employ a core curriculum in the liberal arts and emphasize global study in NYU's Global Network University framework.

== Liberal Studies Core Program ==
The Liberal Studies Core Program is a two-year liberal arts academic program centered on the great books. First-year students study at NYU's campuses in New York City, London, Madrid, Washington D.C., or Florence. After the second year, students transition to their chosen majors throughout NYU to complete their bachelor's degree.

== Global Liberal Studies ==
Global Liberal Studies is a four-year bachelor's degree program. First-year students study at NYU's campuses in New York City, London, Madrid, and Florence, before moving to New York City for the sophomore year. Third-year students are required to study at one of NYU's fourteen global academic centers.
