= Edward P. Gilligan =

American businessman

Edward P. Gilligan (July 13, 1959 – May 29, 2015) was the former Vice Chairman and President of American Express. He graduated from New York University. He was also a Board Member of Lincoln Center for the Performing Arts.
