= New York City Board of Transportation =

Municipal transit commission (1924–1953)

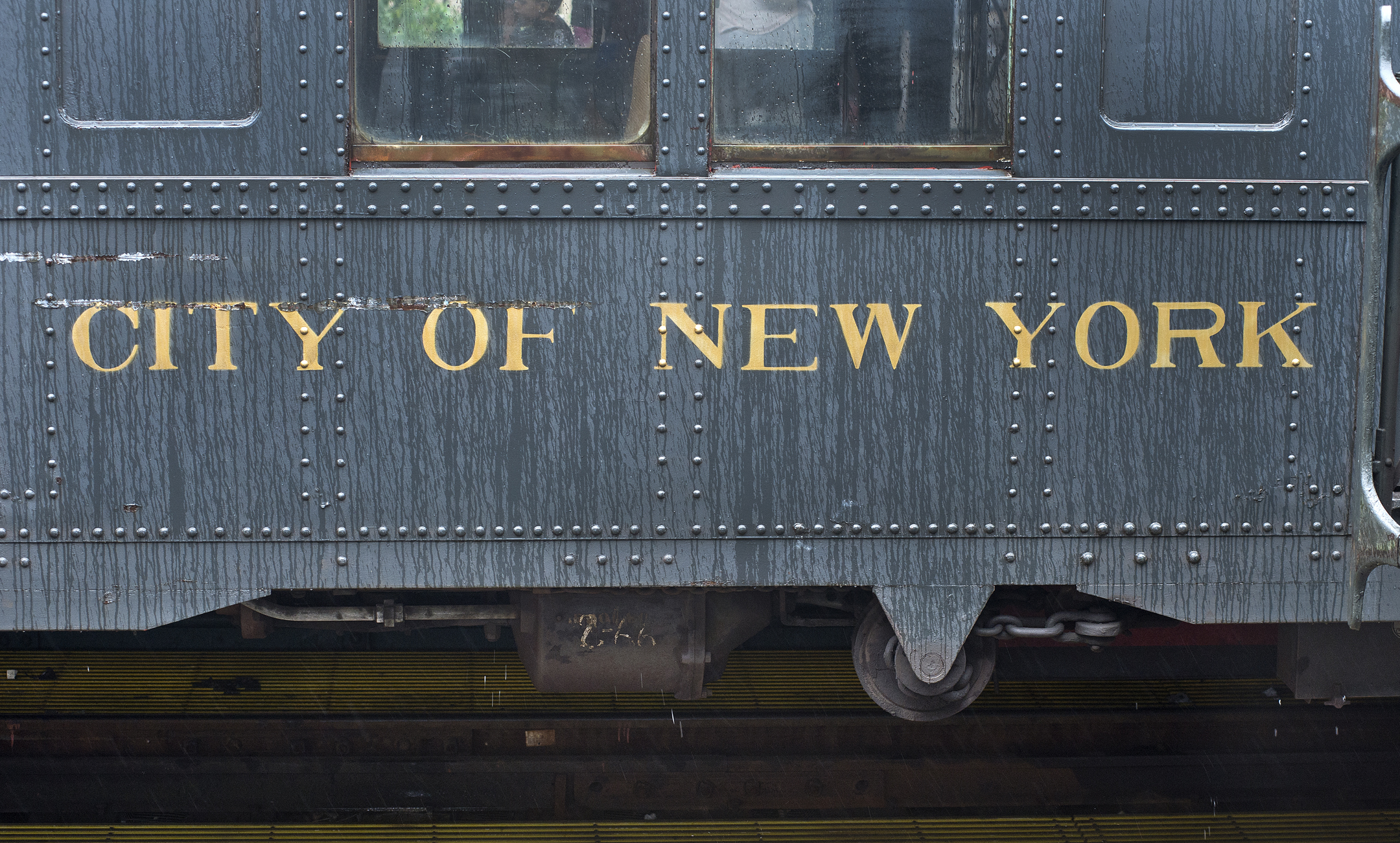
- The side of an R1–9 fleet car, an original IND subway car purchased by the BOT, bearing the name "City of New York".

Overview
- Owner: City of New York
- Locale: New York City
- Transit type: Subways, Elevated railway, Buses, Streetcars, Trolley coaches
- Headquarters: 250 Hudson Street, Manhattan, New York; 385 Flatbush Avenue Extension, Brooklyn, New York; 370 Jay Street, Downtown Brooklyn, New York

Operation
- Began operation: June 1, 1924
- Ended operation: June 15, 1953

The New York City Board of Transportation or the Board of Transportation of the City of New York (NYCBOT or BOT) was an American city transit commission and operator in New York City, consisting of three members appointed by the mayor. It was created in 1924 to control city-owned and operated public transportation service within the New York City Transit System. The agency oversaw the construction and operation of the municipal Independent Subway System (IND), which was constructed shortly after the Board was chartered. The BOT later presided over the major transfers of public transit from private control to municipal control that took place in the 1940s, including the unification of the New York City Subway in 1940. In 1953, the Board was dissolved and replaced by the state-operated New York City Transit Authority, now part of the Metropolitan Transportation Authority (MTA).

== Background ==
In 1874, the New York State Legislature passed a bill allowing for the creation of a rapid transit commission in New York City, which was formed in 1875. This commission mapped out elevated railway routes that would be built by private companies, but did not plan any underground lines. In 1889, Mayor Hugh J. Grant created a five-member rapid transit board to lay out lines in the city.

In 1891, the State Legislature passed the Rapid Transit Act, allowing the government of New York City and all cities with a population of over one million to create a board of "rapid transit railroad commissioners", which would dictate the expansion of rapid transit facilities within the city. The government could issue bonds in order to fund rapid transit for the city. That year, a five-member rapid transit board was created for the city, called the Board of Rapid Transit Railroad Commissioners. The board received bids for a municipal underground rail line, but no bids were selected. The board was abolished in 1894 by the State Legislature due to its failure to create a subway line. It was replaced by a new board whose members included the Mayor of New York City. That year, the New York City government issued a referendum stating that future rapid transit lines should be municipally operated, as opposed to issuing franchises to private operators.

In spite of this, the initial subway lines to be operated in the city − the "first subway" opened in 1904, and the initial portion of the Centre Street Loop to Essex Street opened in 1908 − were privately operated by the Interborough Rapid Transit Company (IRT) and the Brooklyn Rapid Transit Company (BRT) respectively. The initial 1890s transit board was replaced in 1907 by the state-run New York Public Service Commission (PSC). This agency would oversee the Dual Contracts subway expansion, which led to the construction of new lines for the IRT and BRT.

== Creation and subway unification ==
Until 1924, municipal public transportation actions originated primarily from state-controlled agencies, including the 1891 and 1894 rapid transit boards, the PSC, and most recently the New York State Transit Commission which was created in March 1921. Following the creation of the State Transit Commission and the reelection of Al Smith as Governor of New York in 1922, then-mayor John Francis Hylan and future mayors Jimmy Walker (then a state senator) and John P. O'Brien (the city's corporation counsel) sought to establish a city-controlled transit commission. Hylan had been both an opponent of private transit operation, particularly that of the Brooklyn–Manhattan Transit Corporation (BMT; the successor to the BRT), and a political opponent of Smith. Hylan also had his own plans for a city-operated subway system.

In 1924, the New York City Board of Transportation was created by the New York City Board of Estimate following a bill passed by New York State Legislature. The Board of Transportation would responsible for mapping and constructing new rapid transit lines, carrying out the powers dictated in the 1891 Rapid Transit Act, while the State Transit Commission would continue to oversee the privately operated systems. The bill had been deadlocked in the State Assembly for two years until a compromise bill was introduced in February 1924 and passed on April 11 of that year. Governor Smith signed the bill into law on May 2, and the BOT assumed power on June 1. The board's first chairman was John Hanlon Delaney, one of Hylan's top advisers who had been the transit construction commissioner since 1919. The BOT would release the initial plans for what would become the Independent Subway System (IND) on December 9, 1924, based largely off of Mayor Hylan's plans. The first IND subway line and the system's trunk line, the IND Eighth Avenue Line, broke ground on March 14, 1925, and was opened on September 10, 1932. On August 29, 1929, the BOT released its first major plans for the expansion of the city-owned system still under construction. A revision of this proposal was released almost ten years later on July 5, 1939. These plans would later be called the IND Second System, and would go largely unbuilt due to the Great Depression and World War II.

Beginning on June 1, 1940 under the mayoral administration of Fiorello H. La Guardia, the Board of Transportation took over the assets of the IRT and BMT for municipal operations in an event referred to as unification. The event placed the three rapid transit systems − IRT, BMT, IND − under a single operator. The BOT also inherited the BMT's extensive surface transit network in Brooklyn and Queens, which consisted primarily of streetcar lines along with a few electric trolley coach and diesel-powered bus routes. The BOT proceeded to close the IRT-operated Second and Ninth Avenue elevated lines in Manhattan, and the BMT-operated Third and Fifth Avenue elevateds in Brooklyn. On December 15, 1940, the IND's second Manhattan trunk line − the IND Sixth Avenue Line − was completed. In 1941, the BOT began motorizing the former BMT streetcar lines in Brooklyn and Queens into diesel bus routes or trolley coach routes. The further motorization of surface lines, and the completion of the IND system, however, was delayed due to World War II. Unification made the Board of Transportation the largest public transit operator in North America, in addition to being one of the few systems under public ownership at the time.

Following the end of World War II, the BOT resumed subway construction. On February 23, 1947, the Board of Transportation assumed the bus routes of Isle Transportation in Staten Island. On March 30, 1947, the BOT took over the North Shore Bus Company in Queens. Both companies could not operate on the mandated five-cent fare and went bankrupt. This gave the city control of the majority of surface transit in Brooklyn, Queens, and Staten Island. It also created three distinct surface transit divisions: the Brooklyn Bus and Trolley Division, the Staten Island Bus Division, and the Queens Bus Division. On September 24, 1948, the BOT took over the East Side Omnibus Corporation and Comprehensive Omnibus Corporation in Manhattan. At this time, the BOT resumed motorizing trolley lines, and proceeded to construct new storage and repair facilities. It also purchased new buses, to either replace streetcars or the dilapidated buses inherited from private operators.

== Decline ==
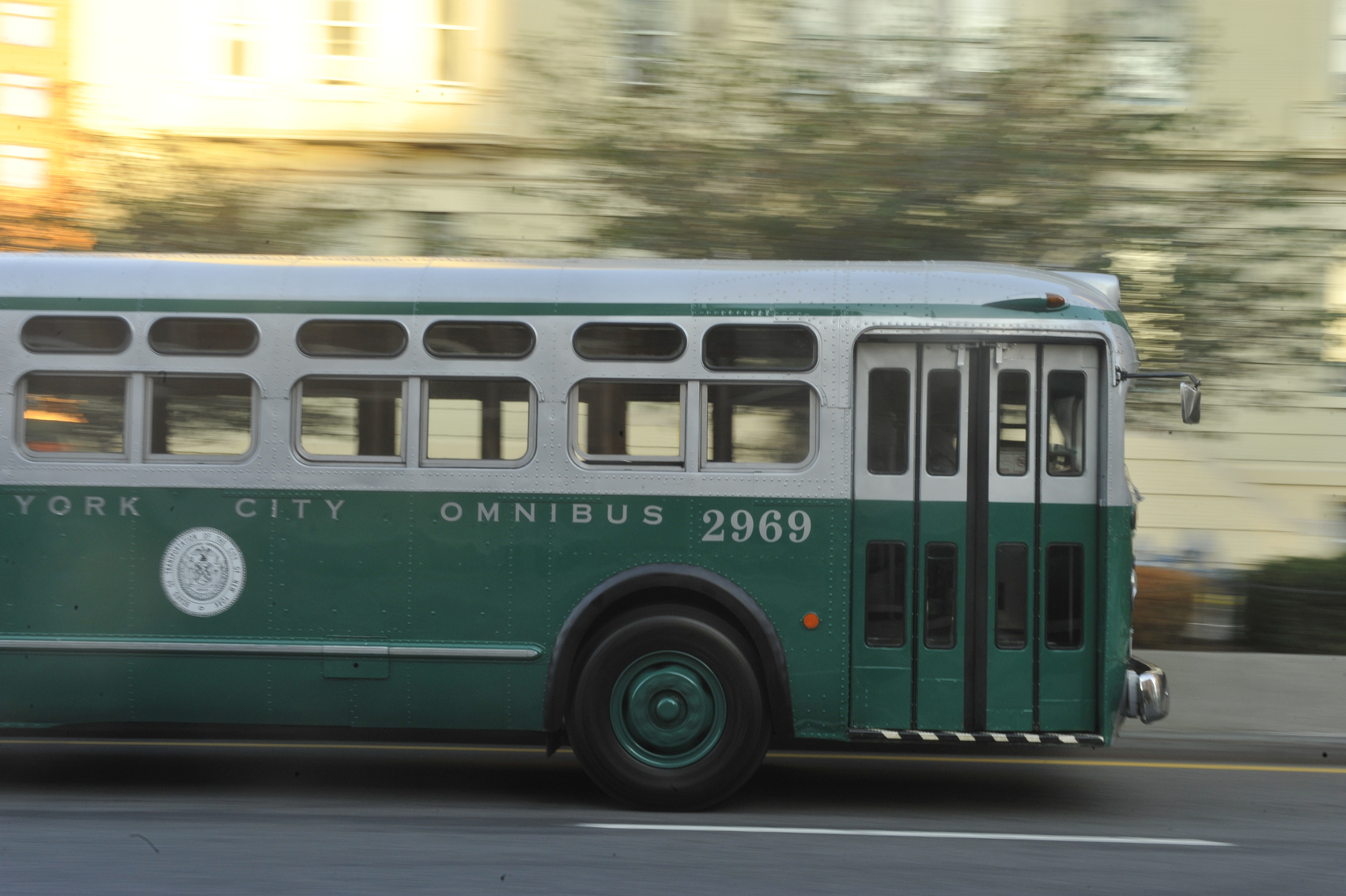
A GM "old-look" transit bus bearing the original green and white color scheme of the Board of Transportation, and a white circular BOT logo. The color scheme would be inherited by the Transit Authority.

Following an artificial operating surplus during World War II, brought on by gas and rubber rations leading to increased mass transit usage, the Board of Transportation had its first operational deficit in 1947, amounting to $18 million. On March 30, 1948, Governor Thomas E. Dewey signed legislation to allow the BOT to increase fares with the approval of the New York City mayor. On July 1, 1948, the Board of Transportation raised the fare for its rapid transit system from five cents to ten cents, with the approval of Mayor William O'Dwyer. The nickel fare had been in place in the subway system since October 27, 1904, a period of 45 years, and was one of the main provisions of the Dual Contracts. New York City was the last major city to have a five-cent fare. The BOT also created 14 new free transfers between the formerly-separate subway divisions. The fare increase was put forward due to increasing debt, inflation in the post-war period, expenditure on new subway routes, equipment and facilities, and maintenance of the existing system which was in disrepair. In addition, city planner Robert Moses pushed for the fare increase to allow more city funding to go towards highway development, while Transport Workers Union of America leader Michael J. Quill supported the fare hike in order to give transit workers a 30-cent per hour wage increase. In 1950, the fare of BOT surface transit was also raised to ten cents. Upon the initial 1948 increases, a twelve-cent fare had been put in place for a combined trip on the subway and either bus or trolley, but this was eliminated on July 1, 1952.

The fare hikes did not effectively increase revenue for the Board of Transportation to offset increasing operation costs, while system ridership plateaued due to the American car culture and increasing migration to the suburbs. After two years of financial surplus, the BOT experienced a $1.2 million deficit in 1950, and a $24.8 million deficit in 1952. The BOT was also criticized due to the influence of politics on the organization, the direct control over the board by the mayor, and the use of the city's operating budget to subsidize transit operations. In March 1953, the New York State Legislature created the New York City Transit Authority (NYCTA), a public authority without direct control from a political office, with members appointed by both the Governor and Mayor. Governor Dewey signed the bill approving the creation of the TA into law on March 20, 1953. On June 15, 1953, operation of the New York City Transit System was turned over to the Transit Authority, with the Board of Estimate leasing the system to the TA for a period of ten years. The Board of Transportation, meanwhile, was dissolved. The new Transit Authority was modeled after the existing Port Authority of New York and New Jersey and Triborough Bridge and Tunnel Authority, the latter of which is also now part of the MTA.

== Headquarters ==
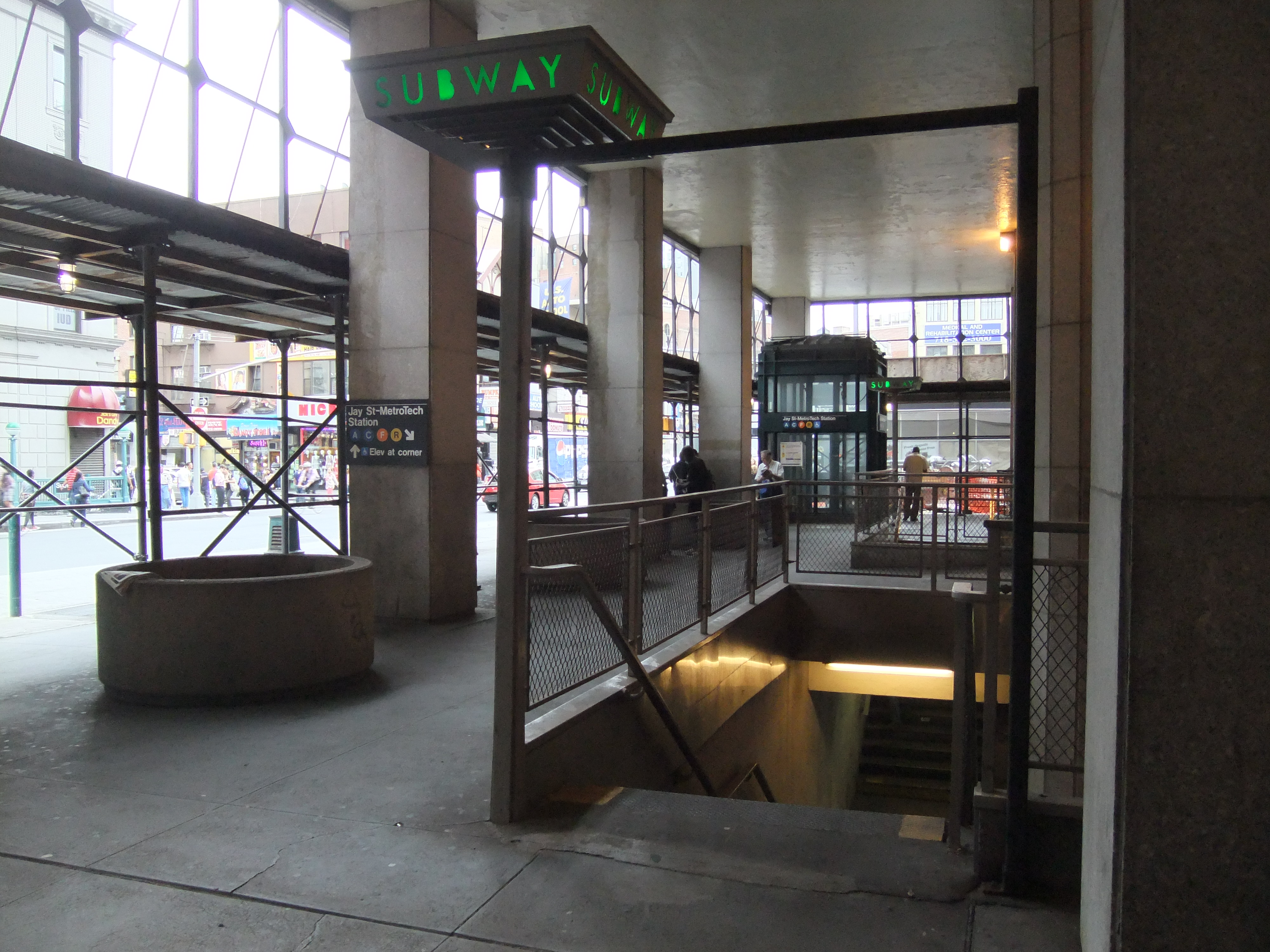
This entrance to the Jay Street–MetroTech subway complex is adjacent to 370 Jay Street, the former Board of Transportation Headquarters.

The Board of Transportation's final headquarters was located at 370 Jay Street, at the northwest corner of Jay Street and Wiloughby Street in the modern MetroTech Center of Downtown Brooklyn. The building is bound by Pearl Street to the west, and was formerly bound by Myrtle Avenue at its north end; this portion of the street has since been de-mapped. The 14-story office building was designed by architects William Haugaard and Andrew J. Thomas in post-war modernist style. The building is L-shaped, the long side along Jay Street, and the short side along the former Myrtle Avenue. The outer facade of the building consists of white limestone, with 420 square and uniformly-arranged casement windows.

The building was intended to serve as the central headquarters of the BOT. The building housed 2,500 employees from several divisions of the board including its executive, legal, and engineering staff. The remainder of the building not used by the BOT would be rented out. The ground level of the building at Jay and Wiloughby Streets is designed with numerous columns forming an arcade. Haugaard, the lead designer, had drafted the design prior to World War II. Within the arcade and adjacent to the building are several entrances to the Jay Street–MetroTech subway complex, which consisted of two separate stations when the building was constructed. The location was selected in order to be in close proximity to the lines of all three subway divisions, in order to collect fares via money train. Passageways from the subway stations, including a visible door in the Jay Street IND station, lead to a money sorting room in the basement of the building. Ground broke on the site on October 8, 1948. The building was erected at a time when many other BOT transit facilities were also being built. The headquarters opened on April 1, 1951, just two years before the BOT ceased existence, and after the death of Haugaard. It cost $10 million to construct. The BOT proceeded to vacate its former headquarters, one at Hudson Street at the entrance to the Holland Tunnel in Hudson Square, Manhattan, and the other in the former Paramount Theatre in Downtown Brooklyn.

Following the dissolution of the BOT, the building was used by the Transit Authority as its headquarters, and later used by the MTA with some space rented out to other organizations including the New York City Police Department. In 1990, the Transit Authority moved its primary headquarters out of 370 Jay Street, to its current location on Livingston Street. Other MTA operations were moved to 2 Broadway (now the headquarters of MTA Bridges and Tunnels) in Manhattan in 1998. In January 2006, the money train operations ended, after which the MTA largely vacated the site. The building is currently being converted for use as part of the Brooklyn Campus of New York University.
