= Jay Street–MetroTech station =

New York City Subway station in Brooklyn

Jay Street–MetroTech
- New York City Subway station complex
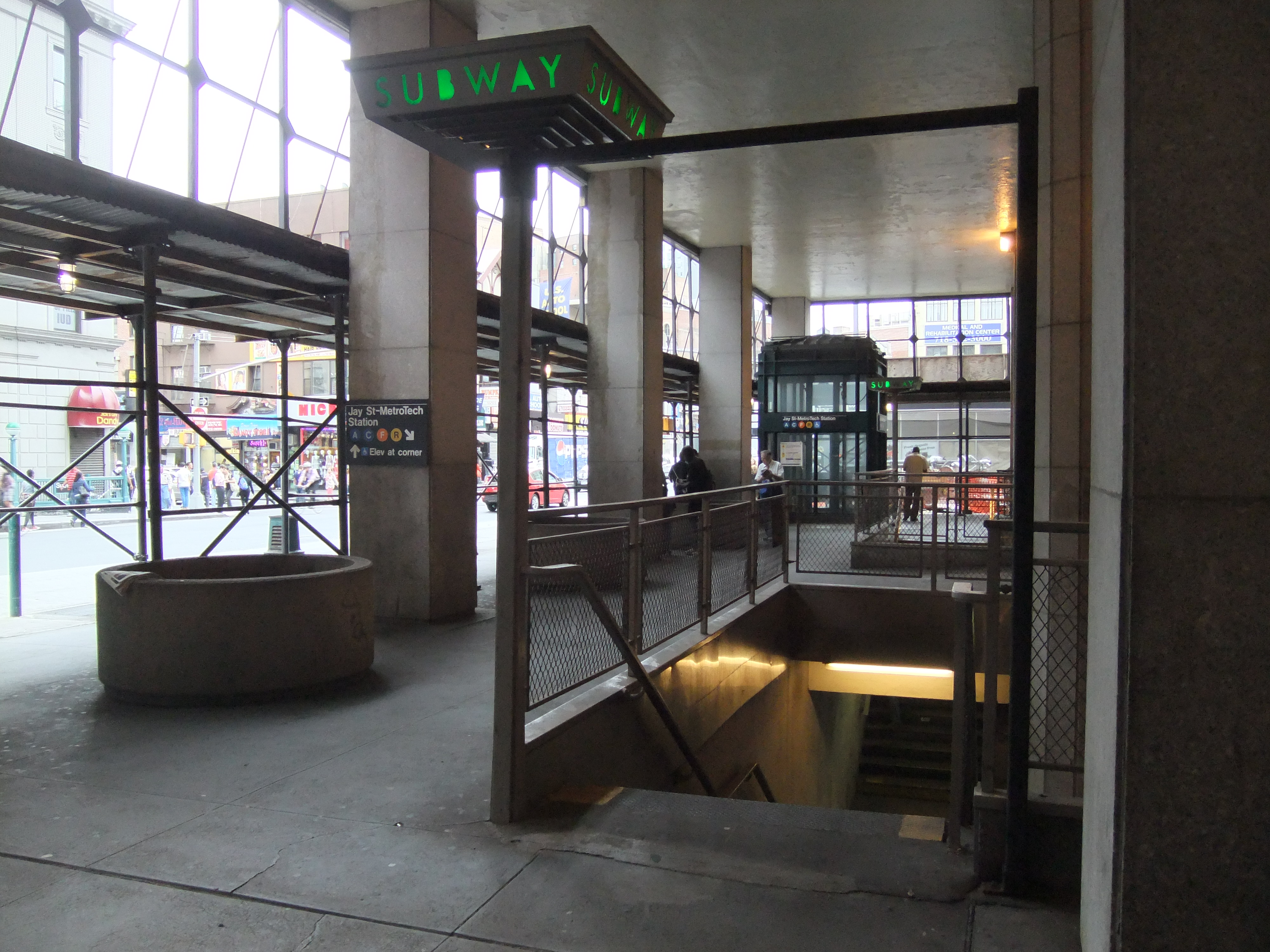
- 370 Jay Street (at Bridge Street) entrance

Station statistics
- Address: Jay Street, Lawrence Street & Willoughby Street; Brooklyn, New York
- Borough: Brooklyn
- Locale: Downtown Brooklyn
- Coordinates: 40°41′37.25″N 73°59′14.04″W
- Division: B (BMT/IND)
- Line: IND Fulton Street Line; IND Culver Line; BMT Fourth Avenue Line
- Services: A (all times); C (all except late nights); F (all times) <F> (two rush hour trains, peak direction); N (late nights); R (all times); W (limited rush hour service only)
- Transit: NYCT Bus: B25, B26, B38, B41, B45, B52, B54, B57, B61, B62, B65, B67; MTA Bus: B103
- Structure: Underground
- Levels: 2

Other information
- Opened: December 10, 2010; 15 years ago (complex)
- Accessible: Yes

Traffic
- 2025: 8,257,695 ▲0.1%
- Rank: 26 out of 423
Location
Location within New York City Subway
Location within New York City
Location within New York
Street map
Station service legend
Symbol	Description
Stops all times except late nights	Stops all times except late nights
Stops all times	Stops all times
Stops late nights only	Stops late nights only
Stops rush hours only	Stops rush hours only
Stops rush hours in the peak direction only	Stops rush hours in the peak direction only
Stops rush hours in the peak direction only (limited service)	Stops rush hours in the peak direction only (limited service)

The Jay Street–MetroTech station is a New York City Subway station complex on the IND Fulton Street, IND Culver, and BMT Fourth Avenue lines. The complex is located in the vicinity of MetroTech Center (near Jay and Willoughby Streets) in Downtown Brooklyn. It is served by the A, F, and R trains at all times; the C train at all times except late nights; the N train during late nights only; and a few rush-hour W trains in the peak direction and <F> trains in the peak direction.

The complex consists of two distinct, perpendicular stations. The Jay Street–Borough Hall station was built by the Independent Subway System (IND) in 1933, while the Lawrence Street–MetroTech station was built by the Brooklyn–Manhattan Transit Corporation (BMT) in 1924. Despite being one block away from each other, the two stations were not connected for 77 years. As part of a station renovation completed in 2010, the Metropolitan Transportation Authority (MTA) built a passageway to connect the two stations and made the complex fully compliant with the Americans with Disabilities Act of 1990. Both stations also contain "money train" platforms, which were formerly used to deliver MTA token revenue to neighboring 370 Jay Street.

== History ==
=== BMT station ===
The Dual Contracts were formalized in March 1913, specifying new lines or expansions to be built by the Interborough Rapid Transit Company (IRT) and the Brooklyn Rapid Transit Company (BRT; later the Brooklyn–Manhattan Transit Corporation, or BMT). The Dual Contracts included the construction of the Montague Street Tunnel, which connected the Broadway Line in Manhattan with the Fourth Avenue Line in Brooklyn at DeKalb Avenue station. Originally, the only station on the Montague Street Tunnel in Brooklyn was to have been at Court Street. After the contract was approved for the Montague Street Tunnel and the associated subway line, the planners realized there should have been a station at Lawrence Street. In 1916, local business owners proposed an additional station at Lawrence and Willoughby Streets. Supporters of the plan said the distance from the south end of the Court Street station to the north end of the DeKalb Avenue station was 3,200 feet (980 m) apart, much longer than comparable stations on the IRT and BRT in Lower Manhattan and Downtown Brooklyn. The original contract was modified in July 1917, and a provision for the station was added.

On May 16, 1918, the New York Public Service Commission approved a report by the Chief Engineer requesting that work on the construction of the station stop due to a wartime shortage of materials and men due to World War I. Only one-ninth of the labor estimated to be required to allow the construction of the station to be completed along with the rest of the line was available. With this reduced labor force, work on this station could not be completed before July 1919, and work on the Court Street station could not be finished before April 1919, following the completion of the Montague Street Tunnel. It was decided to postpone work to complete this station, and use the labor force working on this station and concrete material intended to be used at the station to complete work on the Court Street station, accelerating the estimated completion of that station to January 1919, allowing service through the tunnel to operate in early 1919 as opposed to late 1919. Construction stopped on May 18, when about half the station was completed. Service running through the Montague Tunnel and this station began on August 1, 1920, with the station being constructed alongside in-service trains. The line was called the Montague Street Tunnel Line.

Construction resumed on May 18, 1922. The scope of work included excavation from the street to provide an entrance, the construction of an island platform between the two cast iron-lined tunnels covered by a steel and concrete roof, and the construction of a passageway, mezzanine and entrances. On June 11, 1924, the Lawrence Street station opened with the Lawrence Street entrances; the Bridge Street entrances opened later.

On March 29, 1993, Lawrence Street was renamed Lawrence Street–MetroTech to celebrate the revival of Downtown Brooklyn with the opening of the MetroTech complex. In response to increased ridership at the station from traffic MetroTech generated, new directional signs were installed, a wall that blocked the view of the token booth clerk was removed to improve security, a part-time token booth was added, and lighting was upgraded.

=== IND station ===
New York City mayor John Francis Hylan's original plans for the Independent Subway System (IND), proposed in 1922, included building over 100 miles (160 km) of new lines and taking over nearly 100 miles (160 km) of existing lines, which would compete with the IRT and BMT. On December 9, 1924, the New York City Board of Transportation (BOT) gave preliminary approval for the construction of the IND Eighth Avenue Line. This line consisted of a corridor connecting Inwood, Manhattan, to Downtown Brooklyn, running largely under Eighth Avenue but also paralleling Greenwich Avenue and Sixth Avenue in Lower Manhattan. An additional line, the IND Sixth Avenue Line, was approved in 1925, running from Midtown Manhattan underneath Sixth Avenue, Houston Street, Essex Street, and the Rutgers Street Tunnel to Downtown Brooklyn. By July 1927, the BOT had finalized its plans for new IND lines in Brooklyn. The Eighth Avenue Line was to continue into eastern Brooklyn as the Fulton Street Line, while the Sixth Avenue Line was to continue to South Brooklyn as the Smith Street (later Culver) Line. The lines were to intersect under Jay Street in Downtown Brooklyn.

The Jay Street–Borough Hall station was part of a three-stop extension of the IND Eighth Avenue Line from Chambers Street in Lower Manhattan. Construction of the extension began in June 1928. The extension opened to Jay Street on February 1, 1933. The outer tracks first saw service on March 20, 1933, when the IND Culver Line opened. The IND Sixth Avenue Line to West Fourth Street–Washington Square opened on April 9, 1936, and the Fulton Street Line to Rockaway Avenue opened the same day.

Until 1969, a free transfer was available to/from the BMT Myrtle Avenue Line at Bridge–Jay Streets and also issued at stations from Sumner Avenue on south. When the Myrtle Avenue Line south of Myrtle Avenue closed, the transfer was issued to the B54 bus, which ran along the former route. Today, the MetroCard provides free transfer between bus and subway throughout the system.

==== Experimental installations and programs ====
In 1955, the city decided to experiment with placing raised safety disks on the edges of the platforms, in order to increase passenger safety. Compared to the painted orange-and-yellow stripes on the platforms, the disks, which were painted yellow and spaced one foot apart from each other, were expected to last about five times as long. The northbound platform's disks were 4 inches (10 cm) in diameter, and the southbound platform's were 3 inches (7.6 cm).

In 1957, the city conducted another experiment, this time placing an automatic token dispenser in the station.

In September 1987, the station was the site of yet another experiment; the station's turnstiles were converted to allow new fare payment, consisting of "laminated polyester fare cards." (This would later become the MetroCard, which was not widely released until 1993.)

The station's token booths were shuttered in May 2005, after fare tokens were replaced with MetroCards; station agents were deployed elsewhere in the station to answer passengers' queries. This was part of a pilot program that was tested at seven other stations.

In October 2019, the MTA unveiled an accessible station lab at Jay Street–MetroTech station, which was to run until the end of the year. The lab includes over a dozen features including Braille signs, tactile pads, wayfinding apps, diagrams of accessible routes, and floor stickers to guide passengers to the correct routes.

=== Complex ===
In 1981, the MTA had listed the IND portion of the station among the 69 most deteriorated stations in the subway system. However, in 2005, planned renovation of twelve subway stations, including the Jay Street and Lawrence Street stations, was delayed indefinitely.

The stations were separate from each other since the IND station's opening, despite their proximity. In March 2007, a contract was finally awarded for the renovation of the stations. The MTA constructed a 175-foot (53 m) transfer passageway as part of its 2005–2009 Capital Program. The $164.5 million project also brought the stations into compliance with the Americans with Disabilities Act of 1990 and cosmetically improved the upper mezzanine. With the opening of the transfer on December 10, 2010, the complex was given its present name. The transfer was projected to benefit an estimated 35,000 daily passengers.

In 2016, a new entrance to the BMT portion of the station was built as part of the AVA DoBro residential high-rise building. This entrance replaces an earlier entrance at the southeast corner of Willoughby and Bridge Streets, the corner where the building is located. The MTA was hopeful that this instance would encourage developers to build other entrances to other subway stations, since AVA DoBro's developer paid for the entrance in its entirety. New York City councilmember Lincoln Restler founded a volunteer group, the Friends of MTA Station Group, in early 2023 to advocate for improvements to the Jay Street–MetroTech station and four other subway stations in Brooklyn. The MTA announced in 2025 that a customer service center would open at the station.

== Station layout ==
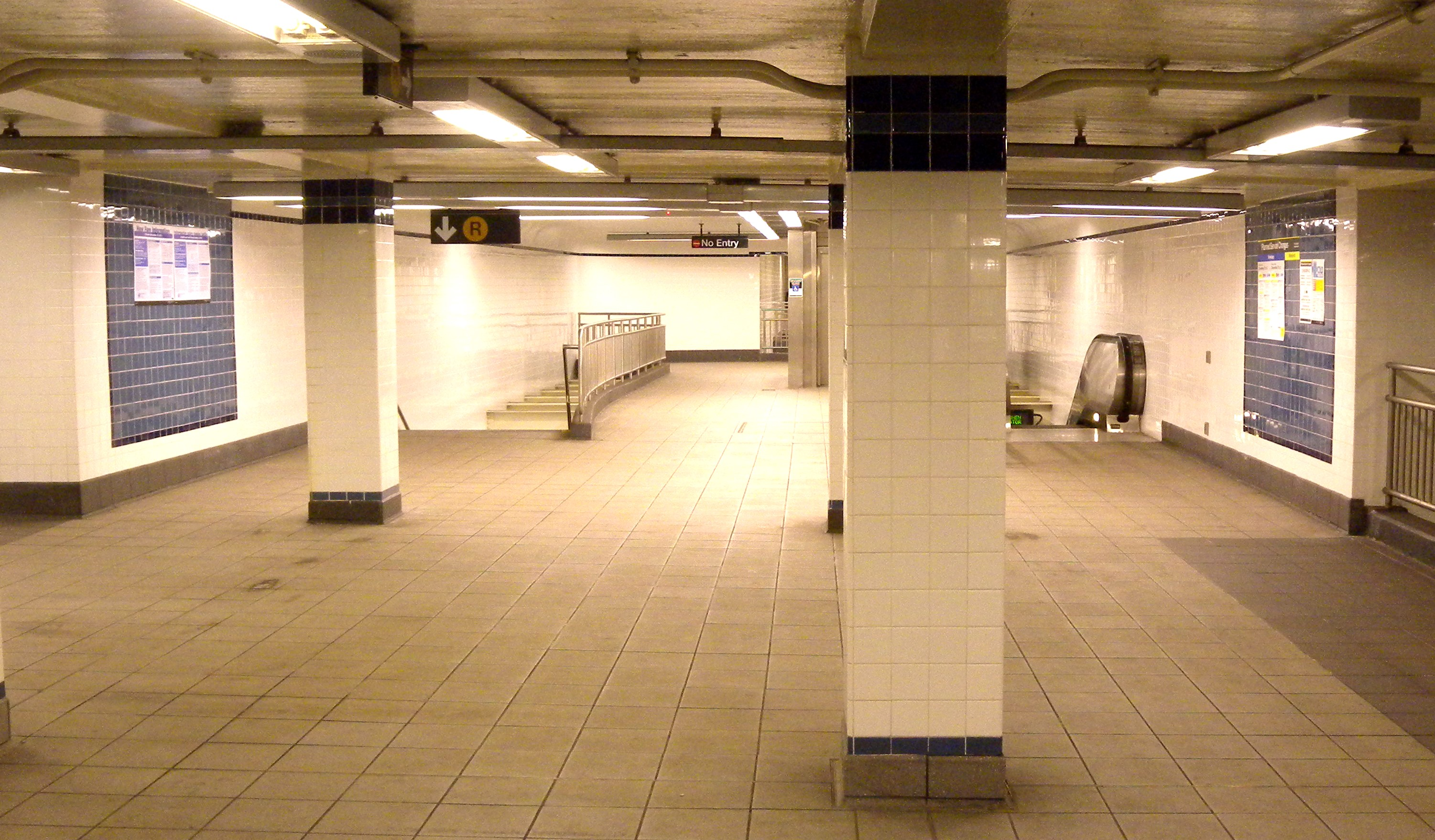
Connecting passageway between the stations

The station consists of three underground levels. Just below ground is the IND mezzanine, then the IND platforms, followed by the BMT platform on the deepest level. The two stations connect to each other via a stair, two escalators, and an elevator at the west end of the BMT station. The BMT station also has its own mezzanine at its eastern end. The stations are located one block away from each other.

The 2009 artwork in this station is called Departures and Arrivals by Ben Snead. It consists of a 173-foot (53 m) long glass mosaic depicting animals including starlings, sparrows, lion fish, parrots, tiger beetles, and koi fish. It was installed as part of the MTA Arts for Transit program during the station complex's renovation.

=== Entrances and exits ===
The full-time IND/BMT entrance is at the center and has a turnstile bank, token booth, and a single street stair leading to the northeast corner of Willoughby and Jay Streets, while a set of staircases and escalators and one ADA-accessible elevator lead to the northwest corner underneath 370 Jay Street, the former headquarters of the Independent Subway System.

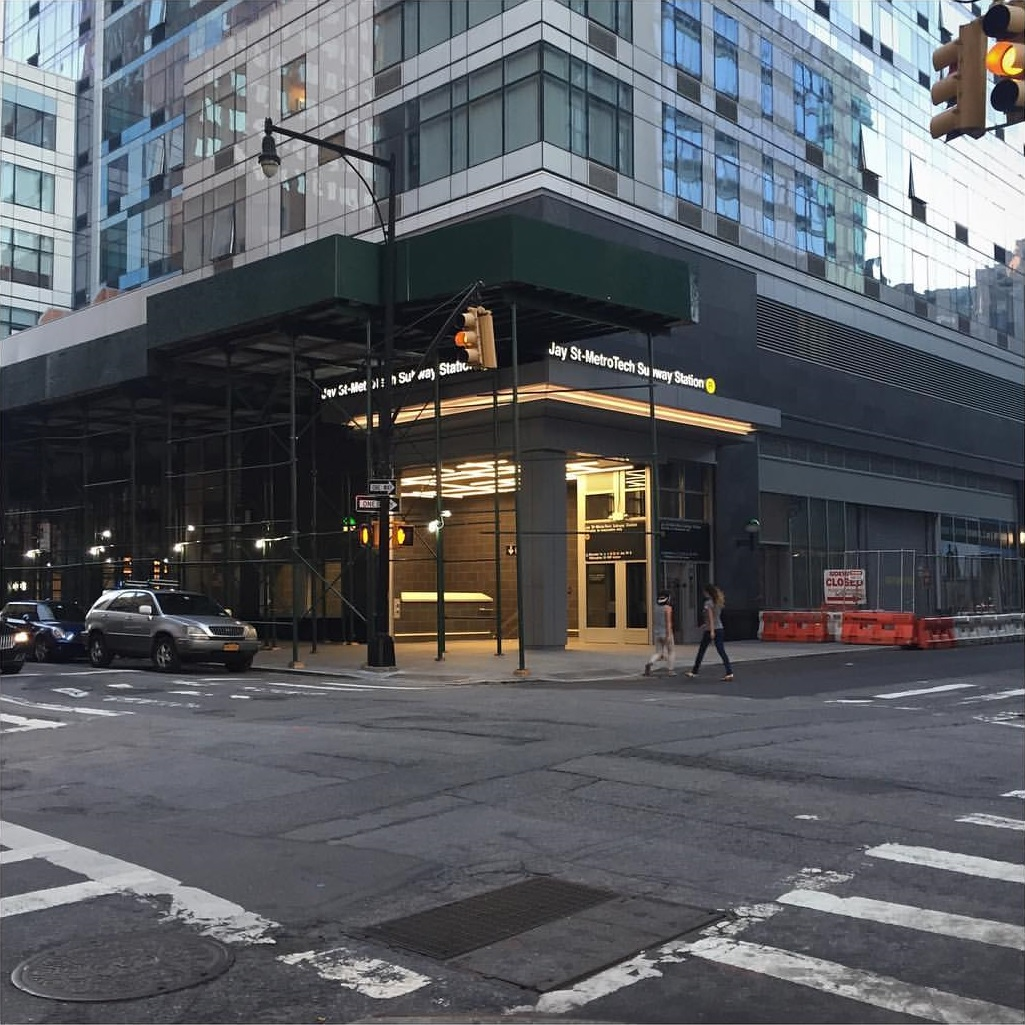
Entrance to BMT platform at southeast corner of Bridge and Willoughby Streets, built in 2016

The other two entrances/exits are unstaffed. The one at the north end has a weekday-only turnstile bank and token booth, full height turnstiles, and a wide staircase to MetroTech Center and another stair and four escalators to the former New York City Transit Headquarters, a mostly vacant 13-story building at 370 Jay Street. These escalators were installed as part of a 1952 improvement, as were the squarish "Subway" entrance lamps that are found only in a few other places in the system. These were designed in Art Deco/Art Moderne style. The building itself has a memorial to New York City Transit workers who died in World War II. The entrance/exit at the south end has only full height turnstiles and two staircases leading to either side of Jay and Fulton Streets.

The full-time BMT-only entrance is at Lawrence and Willoughby Streets near the west end. It has two platform stairs facing the opposite direction, a small turnstile bank, token booth, and four stairs to the two eastern corners of the aforementioned intersection. The stairs serve the BMT platform directly.

There is an additional full-height turnstile entrance at the east end. It formerly contained a booth and has two street stairs to Bridge and Willoughby Streets, high turnstiles, and two platform stairs. This fare control area was the first in the system to have its service gate converted to an emergency exit. An exit-only escalator on the BMT platform also leads to the southeast corner's entrance/exit. The AVA DoBro building contains stairs and an elevator, which connect to the eastern, full-height turnstile entrance. Unlike the elevator entrance at Jay and Willoughby Streets, this elevator entrance is not ADA-accessible.

The station has a total of 16 staircase/escalator entrances and 2 elevator entrances. Full-time entrances are indicated in green, and part-time entrances are indicated in red.

Exit location	Exit type	Number of exits
SE corner of Jay Street and Myrtle Promenade	staircase	1
West side of Jay Street and Myrtle Promenade (under 333 Adams Street)	staircase	1
NW corner of Jay Street and Willoughby Street (under 370 Jay Street)	escalator	1 set of escalators
NW corner of Jay Street and Willoughby Street (under 370 Jay Street)	staircase	2
NW corner of Jay Street and Willoughby Street (under 370 Jay Street)	elevator	1 (ADA-accessible)
NE corner of Jay Street and Willoughby Street	staircase	2
NW corner of Jay Street and Fulton Street	staircase	1
NE corner of Jay Street and Fulton Street	staircase	1
NE corner of Willoughby Street and Lawrence Street	staircase	2
SE corner of Willoughby Street and Lawrence Street	staircase	2
NE corner of Willoughby Street and Bridge Street	staircase	1
SE corner of Willoughby Street and Bridge Street	staircase	1
SE corner of Willoughby Street and Bridge Street	elevator	1 (not ADA-accessible)
SW corner of Willoughby Street and Bridge Street	staircase	1

== IND Fulton Street / Culver Line platforms ==
Jay Street–MetroTech
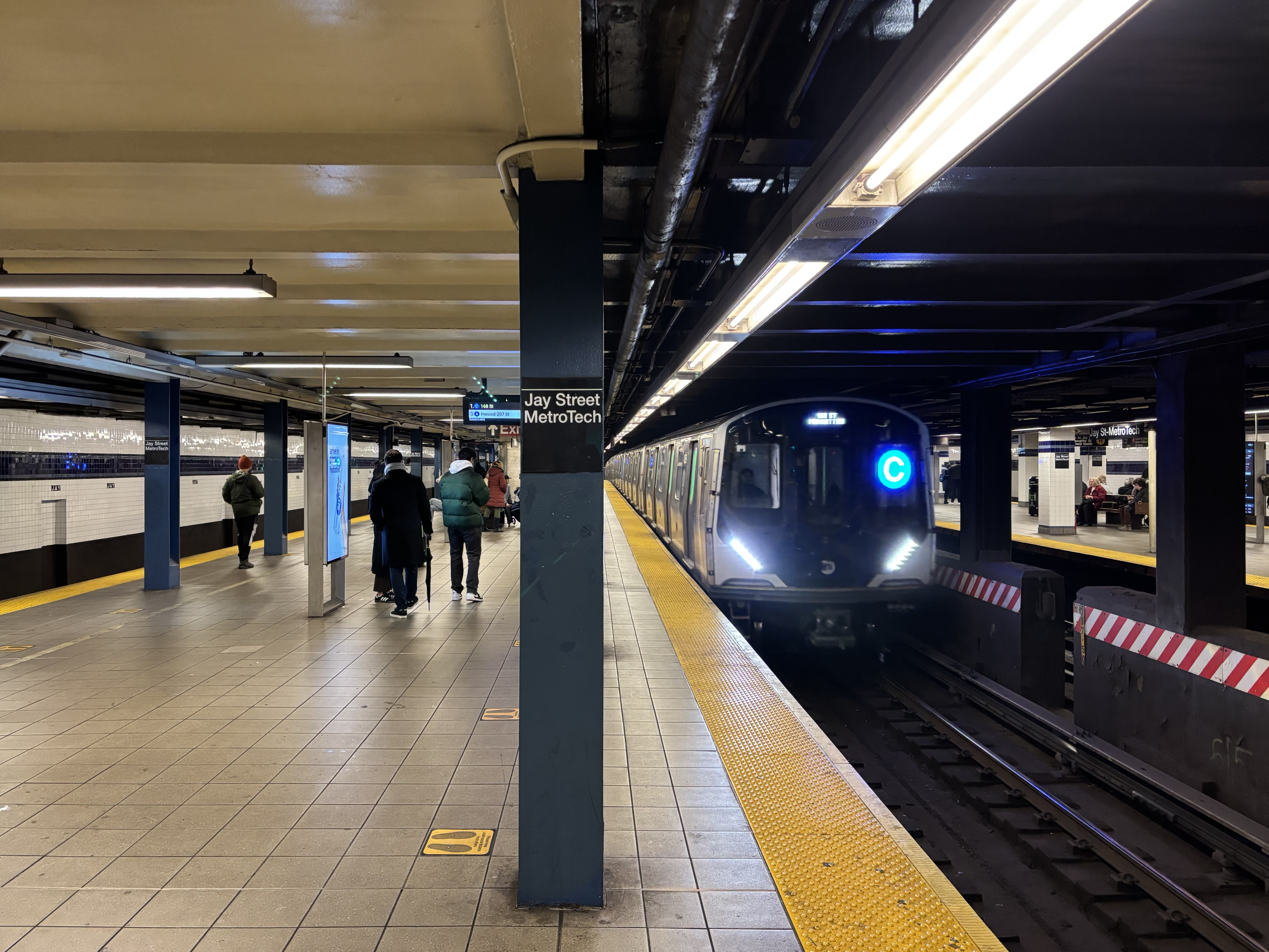
- R211A C train arriving at the northbound platform

Station statistics
- Division: B (IND)
- Line: IND Fulton Street Line; IND Culver Line
- Services: A (all times); C (all except late nights); F (all times) <F> (two rush hour trains, peak direction)
- Platforms: 2 island platforms cross-platform interchange
- Tracks: 4

Other information
- Opened: February 1, 1933; 93 years ago
- Accessible: Yes
- Former/other names: Jay Street–Borough Hall (1933–2010)
Services
Preceding station	New York City Subway	Following station
High Street A C via Canal Street	A (New York City Subway service) C (New York City Subway service)	Hoyt–Schermerhorn Streets A C services split
York Street F <F> toward Jamaica–179th Street	Express	Seventh Avenue <F> toward Coney Island–Stillwell Avenue
York Street F <F> toward Jamaica–179th Street	Local	Bergen Street F toward Coney Island–Stillwell Avenue
Non-revenue services and lines
Preceding station	New York City Subway	Following station
	no service	Bergen Street Culver express
Former services
Preceding station	New York City Subway	Following station
Broadway–Nassau Street toward 21st Street–Queensbridge	JFK Express	Howard Beach–JFK Airport Terminus
Broadway–Nassau Street toward 21st Street–Queensbridge	JFK Express	Aqueduct Racetrack One-way operation
Track layout
Station service legend
Symbol	Description
Stops all times except late nights	Stops all times except late nights
Stops all times	Stops all times
Stops late nights only	Stops late nights only
Stops rush hours in the peak direction only (limited service)	Stops rush hours in the peak direction only (limited service)

The Jay Street–MetroTech station (formerly Jay Street–Borough Hall station before the construction of the station complex) is an express station on both the IND Fulton Street and Culver lines. It has four tracks with two island platforms. The station is served by the A and F at all times and by the C except at night. Fulton Street Line trains (the A and C) use the center "express" tracks, while Culver Line trains (the F) use the outer "local" tracks. Current service patterns route all IND Eighth Avenue Line trains to the Fulton Street Line and all IND Sixth Avenue Line trains to the Culver Line. As such, for A and C trains, the station is between High Street to the north and Hoyt–Schermerhorn Streets to the south. For F trains, the station is between York Street to the north and Bergen Street to the south. Diamond crossovers north of the station permit Eighth Avenue–Culver or Sixth Avenue–Fulton Street service; these switches are only used during service disruptions.

The station originally measured 600 feet (180 m) long, and each platform measures about 30 feet (9.1 m) wide. The station has blue I-beam columns on the Manhattan-bound platform and white concrete tile columns on the Brooklyn-bound one. The station's walls had blue tiles. Before renovation, the trim line on the platform walls was two-tone cobalt blue with "JAY" tiled in white lettering on a black background underneath. As part of the renovation, new tiling was placed on the trackside walls. After the renovation, the blue trim-line was widened and a double border of Heather Blue and black was added. The new blue tile in the centre of the trim-line is also somewhat darker than the original, the new color being shown as "Midnight Blue".

Each platform has six staircases and one elevator leading up to the full-length mezzanine. Before renovation, the entire mezzanine was inside fare control, but the mezzanine was split into two separate parts during the renovation. Now, the mezzanine has a larger southern section connecting to the southern exits, the central exits, and the transfer to the BMT platform; as well as a smaller northern section connecting to the northern exits only. The two parts of the mezzanine are cut off by a large white wall.

=== Gallery ===
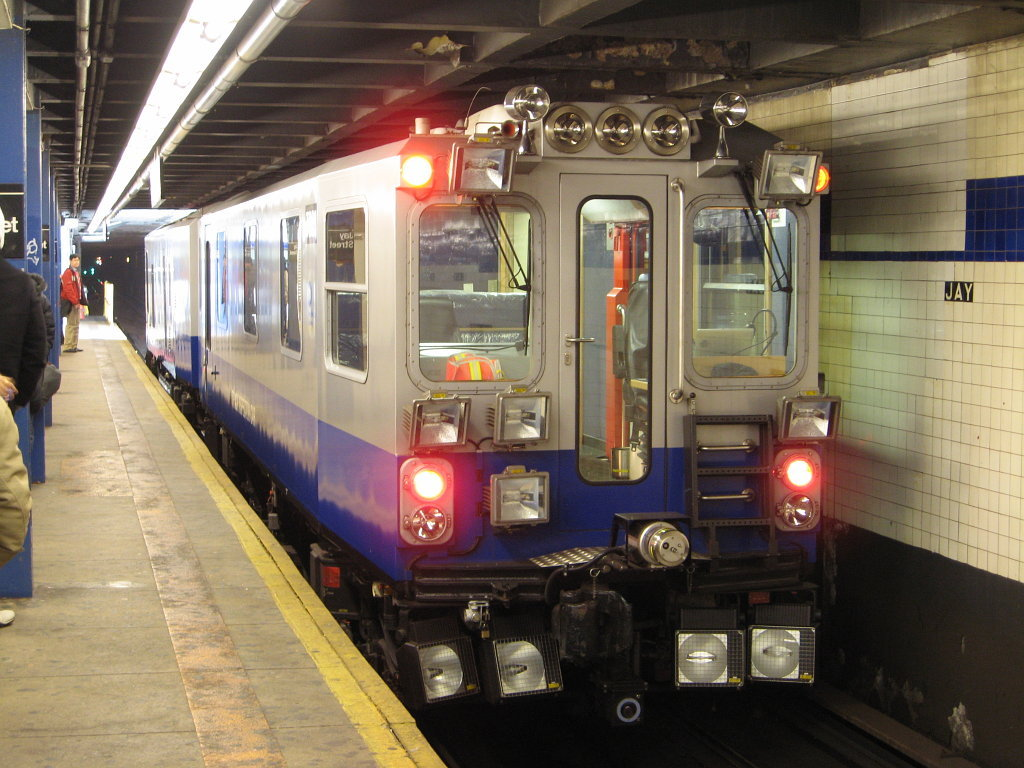
Track geometry car on northbound track from IND Culver line

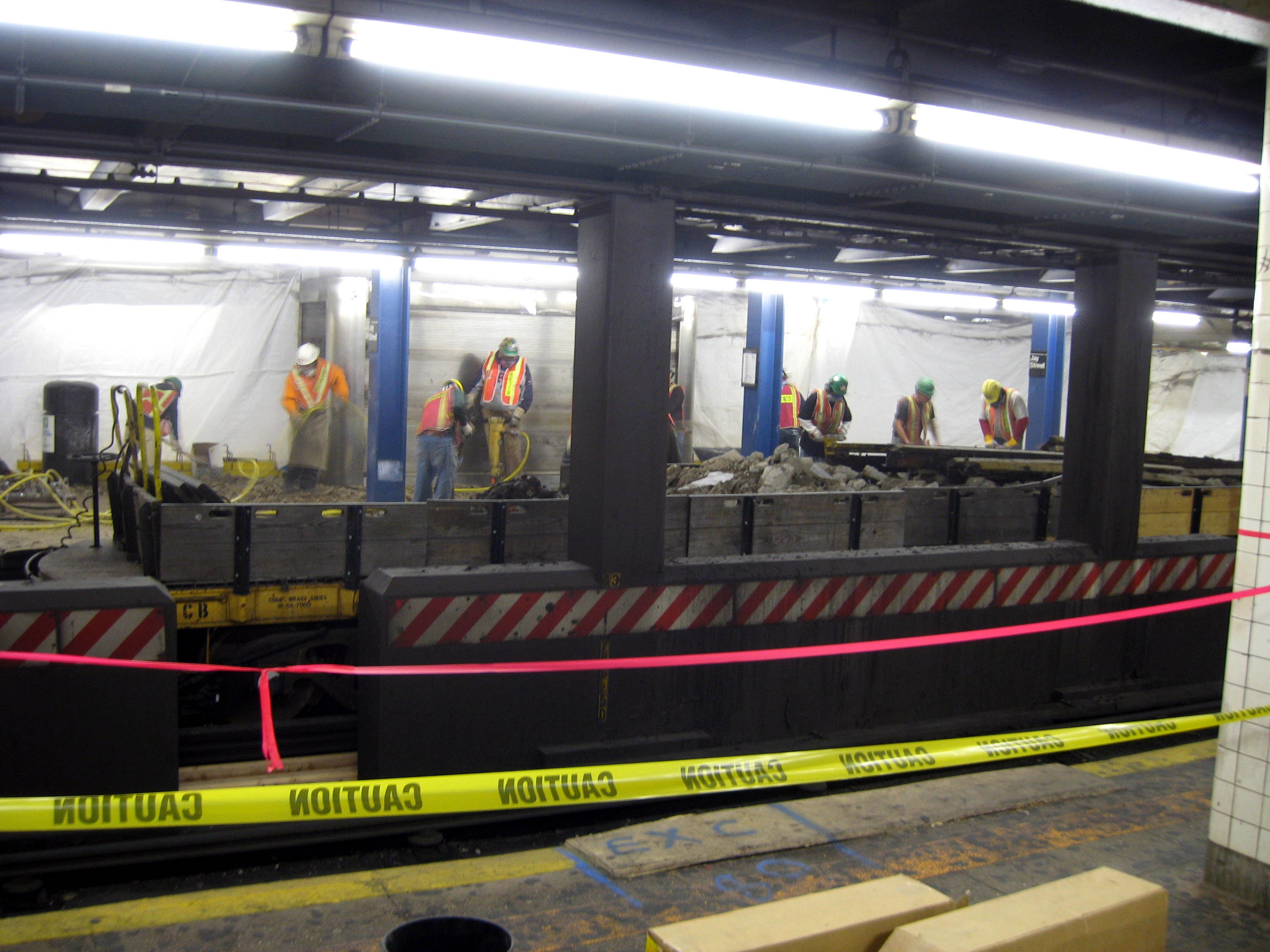
Demolition in progress

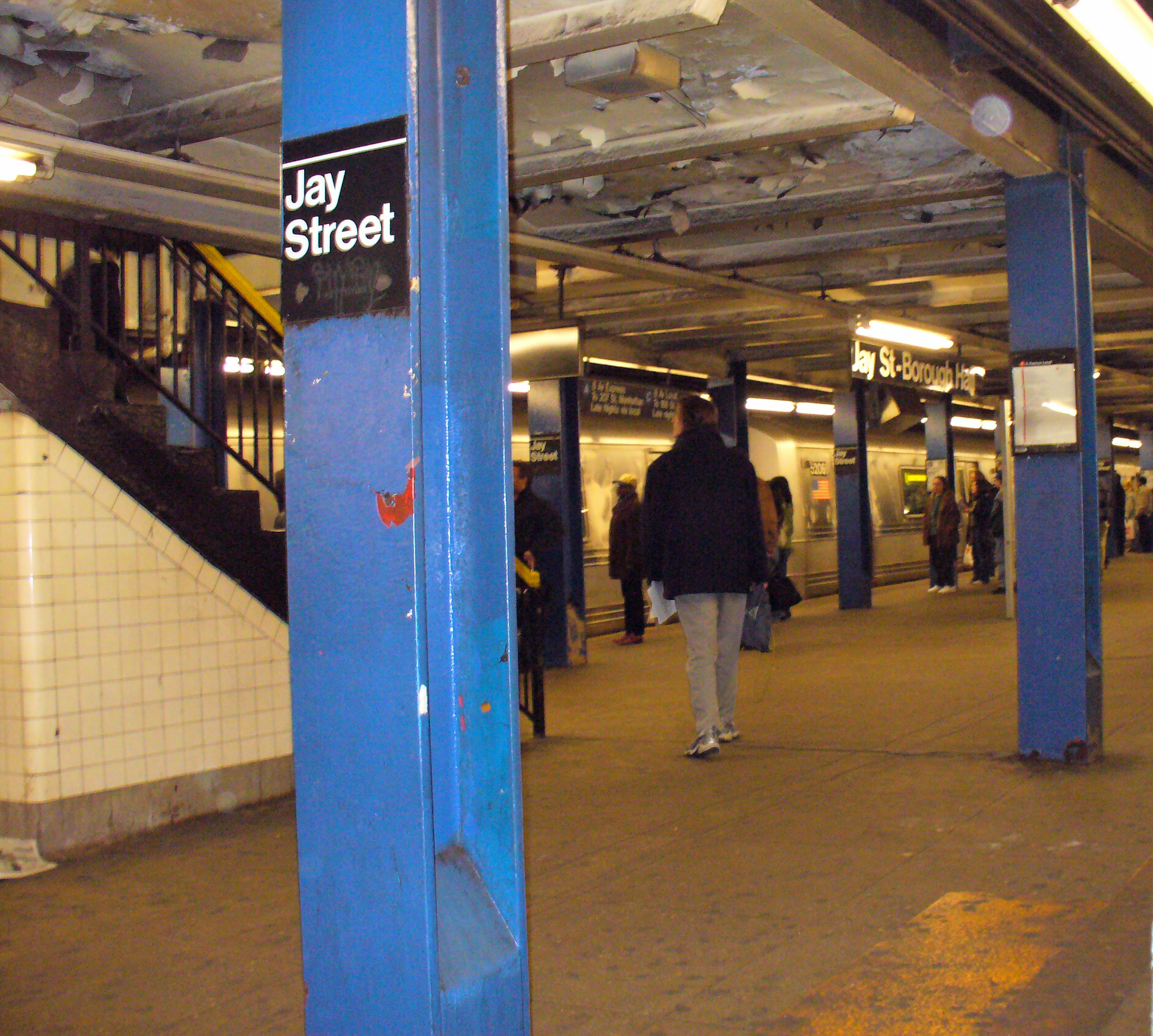
Column and sign on the IND platform, prior to renovation

== BMT Fourth Avenue Line platform ==
Jay Street–MetroTech
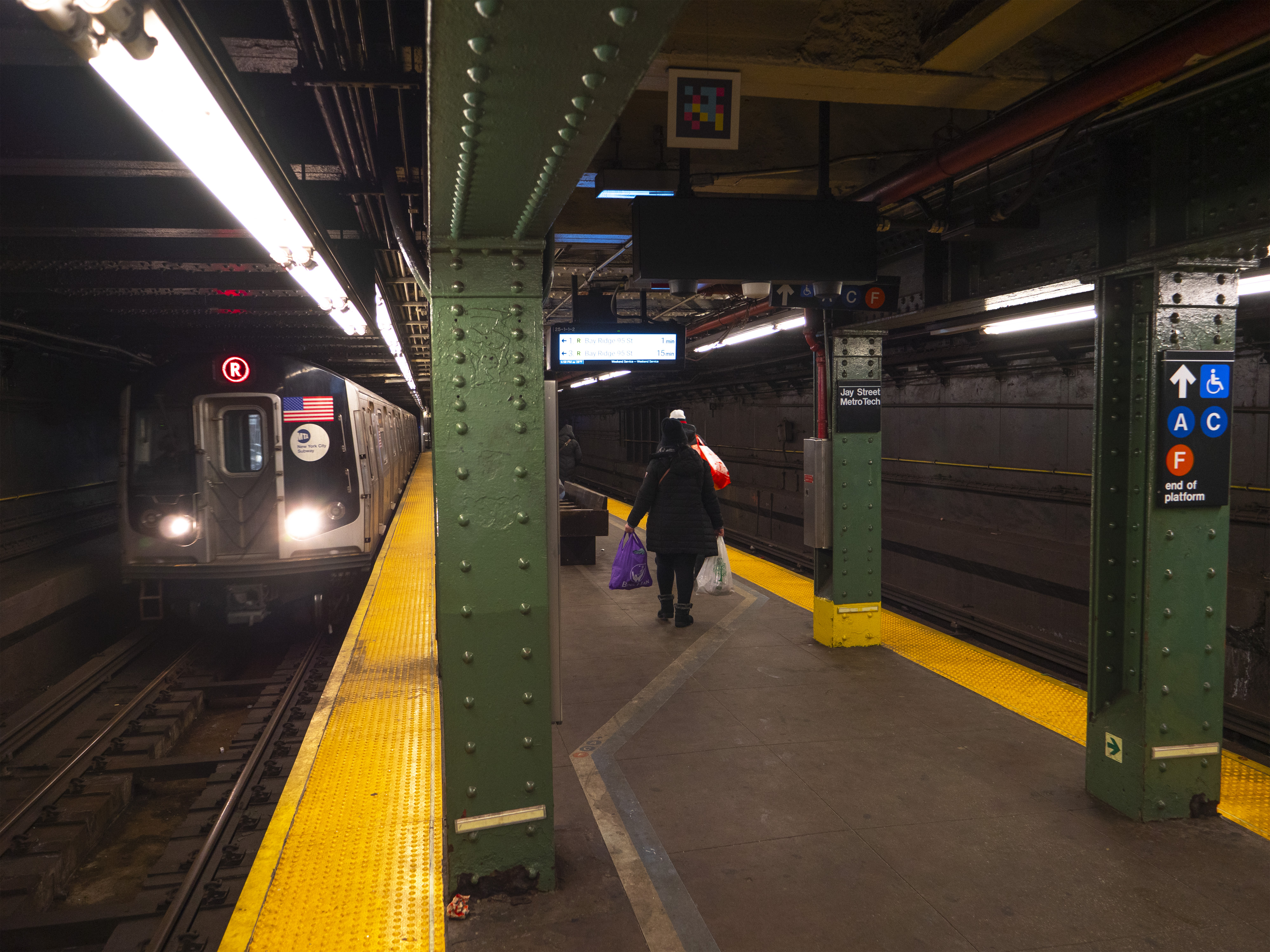
- Southbound R160 R train arriving at the platform

Station statistics
- Division: B (BMT)
- Line: BMT Fourth Avenue Line
- Services: N (late nights); R (all times); W (limited rush hour service only)
- Platforms: 1 island platform
- Tracks: 2

Other information
- Opened: June 11, 1924; 102 years ago
- Accessible: Yes (Accessible entrance only provided at 370 Jay Street; entrance at the southeast corner of Willoughby and Bridge Streets is not accessible)
- Former/other names: Lawrence Street–MetroTech (1993–2010); Lawrence Street (1924–1993)
Services
Preceding station	New York City Subway	Following station
Court Street N R W toward Forest Hills–71st Avenue	Local	DeKalb Avenue N R W toward Bay Ridge–95th Street
Track layout
Station service legend
Symbol	Description
Stops all times	Stops all times
Stops late nights only	Stops late nights only
Stops rush hours only	Stops rush hours only
Stops rush hours in the peak direction only	Stops rush hours in the peak direction only

The Jay Street–MetroTech station (formerly Lawrence Street–MetroTech station before the construction of the station complex) on the BMT Fourth Avenue Line is a local station with two tracks and one narrow island platform. The station is served by the R at all times, by limited W trains during rush hours, and by the N only during the night. The station is between Court Street to the north and DeKalb Avenue to the south. Unlike in the IND station, there are no tiles on the track walls.

A narrow mezzanine above the platform connects the station's two easternmost fare control areas. It still has its original directional signs labeled as "to Lawrence Street" and "to Bridge Street".

The platform formerly had a narrow up-only escalator that bypassed the Lawrence and Willoughby Streets fare control, and led to a small landing with two high exit-only gates. A short staircase then connected to the landing of the southeast street stairs to that intersection.

=== Gallery ===
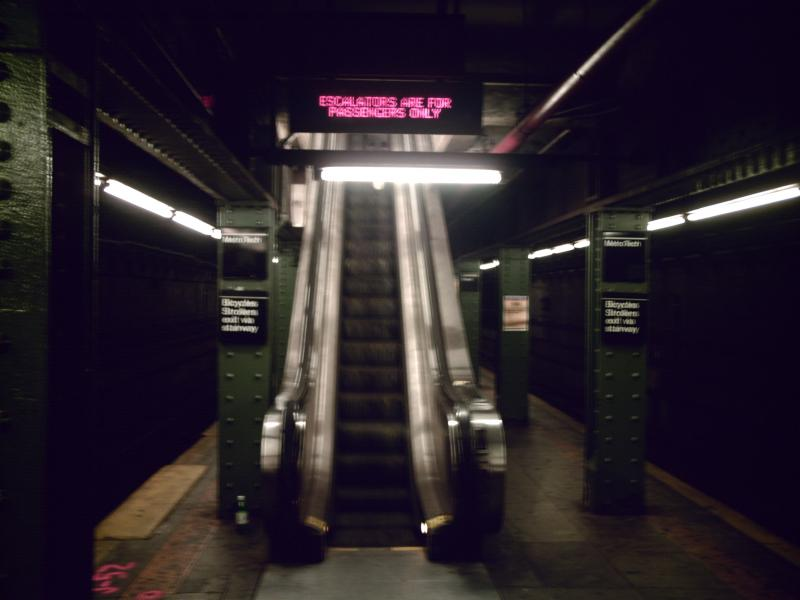
Exit-only escalator from the BMT platform, permanently closed and removed

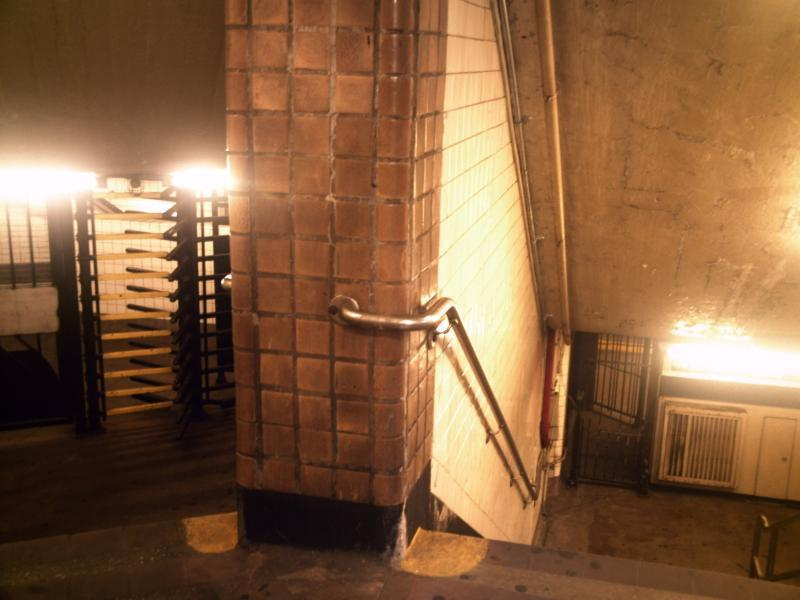
Inside the BMT station; exit-only on the left (permanently closed) and main entrance on the right

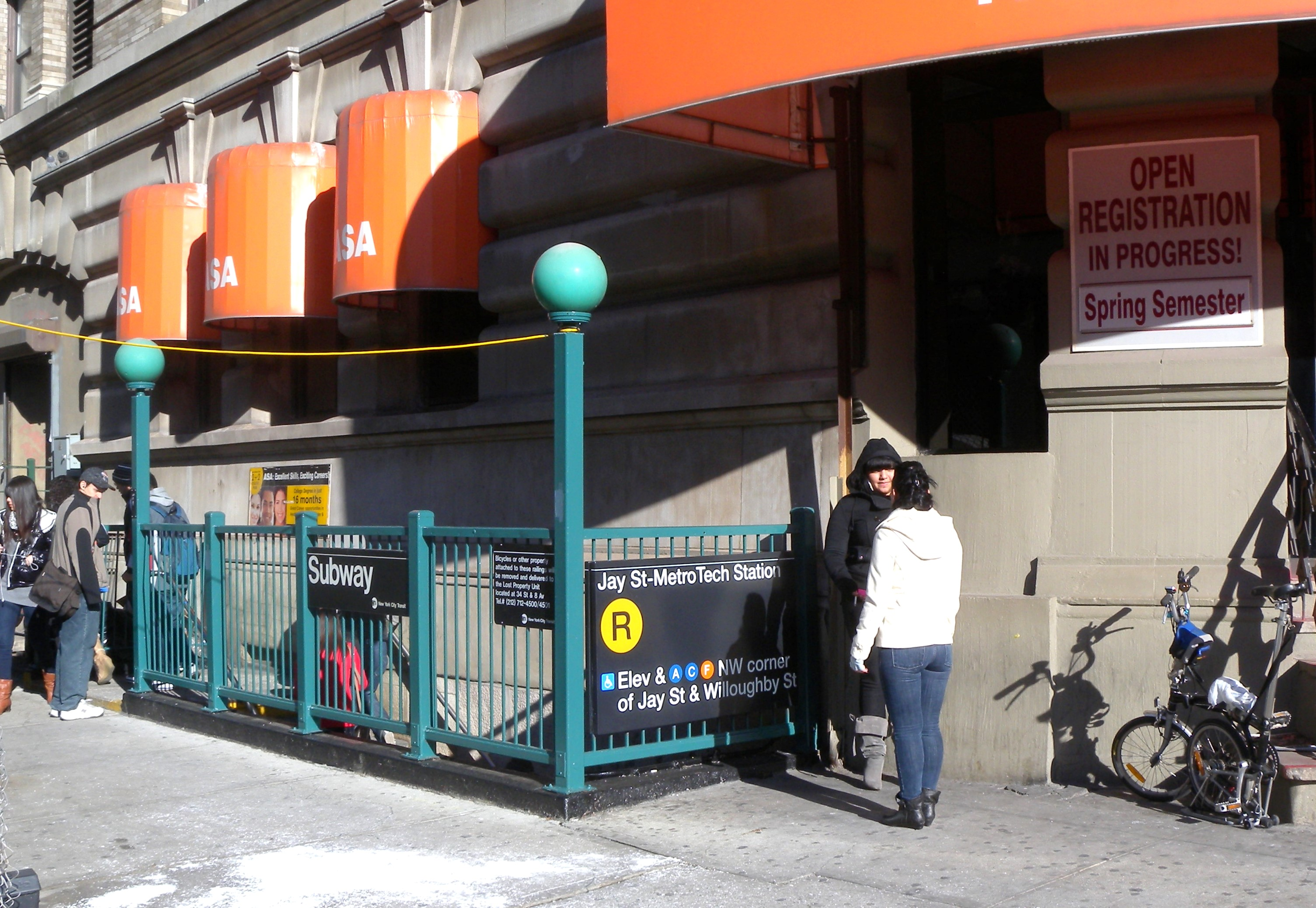
Entrance from street

== Money train platforms ==
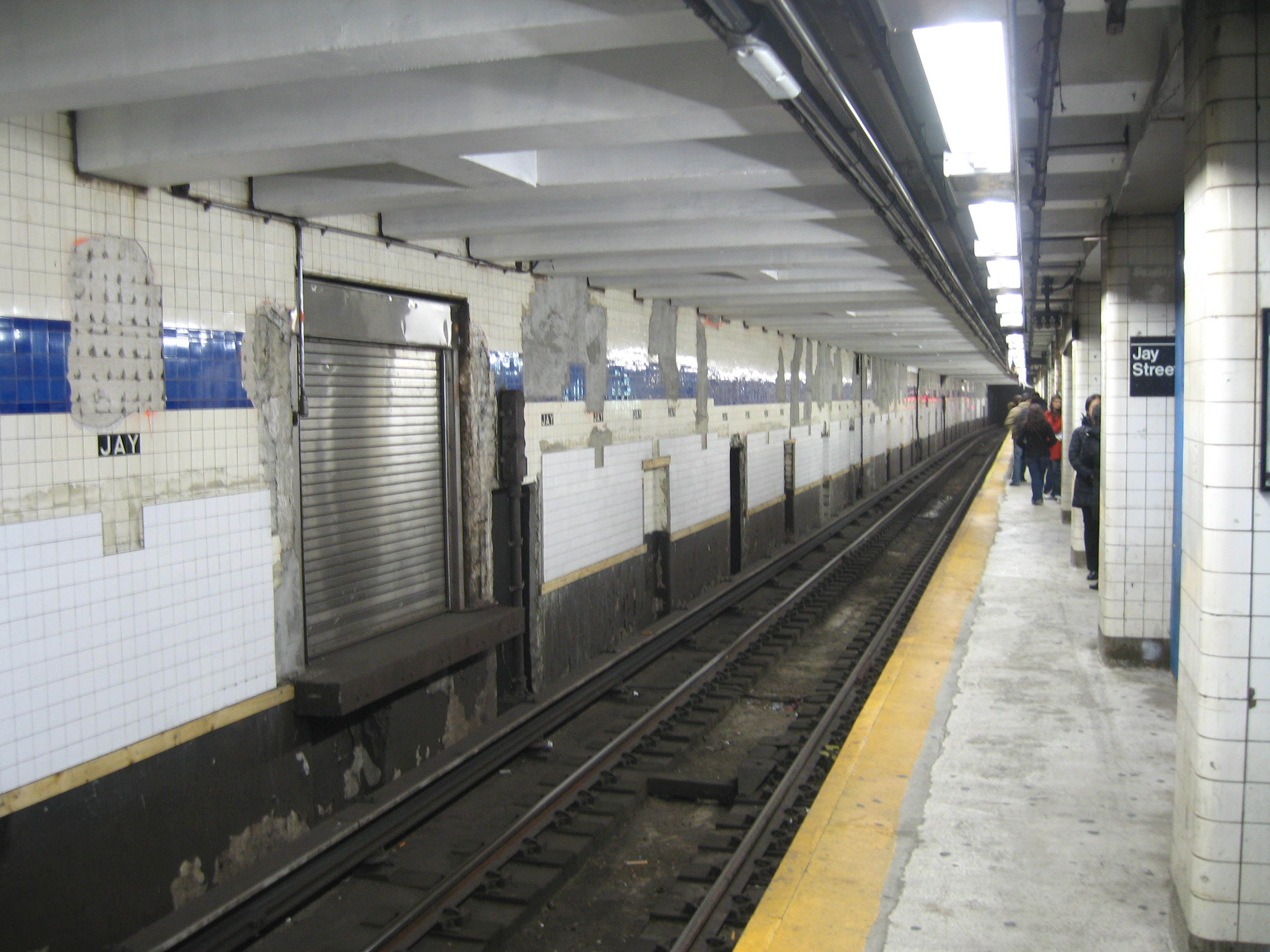
Money train door on southbound track of the IND platform

Formerly, "money trains" collected the tokens that were used to pay fares at each of the subway stations and deposited them into a special door that led to a money-counting room under 370 Jay Street. The platforms were built in 1951, the same year the building opened, though "money trains" had been in use on the system since 1905. The platforms were placed next to 370 Jay Street because it was a convenient location near where all three subway companies had tunnels. Tokens became New York City Transit fare media in 1951. Tokens were last used in the entire New York City Transit system, including the subway, in 2003. This meant that the money trains were no longer used, and in December 2006, the platforms were closed. The money trains were also retired, though for a different reason: they moved slowly, and the Metropolitan Transportation Authority was concerned that the money trains would delay train traffic. The money train later became part of the collection of the nearby New York Transit Museum, and in October 2015, the museum started hosting another exhibit, The Secret Life of 370 Jay Street, that chronicled the building's varying uses.

Each of the three former companies that made up the current New York City Subway (the Independent Subway System, Brooklyn–Manhattan Transit Company, and Interborough Rapid Transit Company) had their own money train platforms. IND money trains made their deposits from the southbound IND Culver line track, and the still-visible door on the wall is where they connected to the vaults above before armored trucks replaced them. For the BMT, there was a second platform just west of the station, after a diamond crossover between the two tracks; this was the deepest of the three money train platforms. A third platform is also in the IRT Eastern Parkway Line tunnel that passes through this area for the same purpose.

== Nearby points of interest ==
- New York City College of Technology
- NYU Tandon School of Engineering
- MetroTech Center
- Brooklyn Borough Hall
- Brooklyn Supreme Court
- Fulton Mall
- Brooklyn Tabernacle
- New York Transit Museum
