= Money room =

Room in New York City Transit Authority headquarters

In New York City Transit Authority (NYCTA) terminology, the money room referred to a highly secure facility located on the second floor of NYCTA headquarters at 370 Jay Street that handled cash collected in the system and recycled tokens formerly used throughout the automated fare collection system.

A fictionalized account of the money room, and a cash-carrying work train, popularly called the "money train", and officially known as the revenue collection train; has featured in the 1995 film "Money Train". The facility at 370 Jay Street in Downtown Brooklyn, was decommissioned in 2006.

This facility had a direct connections via tunnels to small docks on the subway system, one route each for each division: IRT, BMT and IND that ran closest to 370 Jay Street and thereby allowing the money train to stop and drop off collected cash and pick up bags of tokens for distribution to token booths throughout the system.

Only the IND Division unloading dock could be seen from public vantage point in the Jay Street - Borough Hall Station. The other two locations were located between stations out of public view.)

From these loading and unloading dock doors led to corridors in the basement of 370 Jay Street, and in turn led to a direct freight elevator from the basement corridors to the money room the second floor.

The Money Room was also where blank MetroCards were encoded on the High Throughput Encoding Machine.

Prior to the construction of 370 Jay Street; revenue was collected by armored truck and brought to the money room at 250 Hudson Street; which was leased by the Board of Transportation - City of New York from the Federal Government.

The functions of the money room have been moved to a "consolidated revenue facility", located in Maspeth, Queens. This new location serves all of the different constituent transportation agencies, not just the subway system. It processes the cash received at bridge and tunnel facilities also. It is not subway-accessible, so cash and MetroCards are today distributed via specialized armored trucks.

While popularly believed that the Money Room was a "secret", this is a popular misconception as its purpose and location have been known to the public since its construction (New York Times, March 31, 1951) and when the $300,000 embezzlement took place in July 1979 (New York Times, New York Daily News); as well as known to employees, both those credentialed for work in the money room; as well as other transit employees from other departments.
