= 370 Jay Street =

Building in Brooklyn, New York

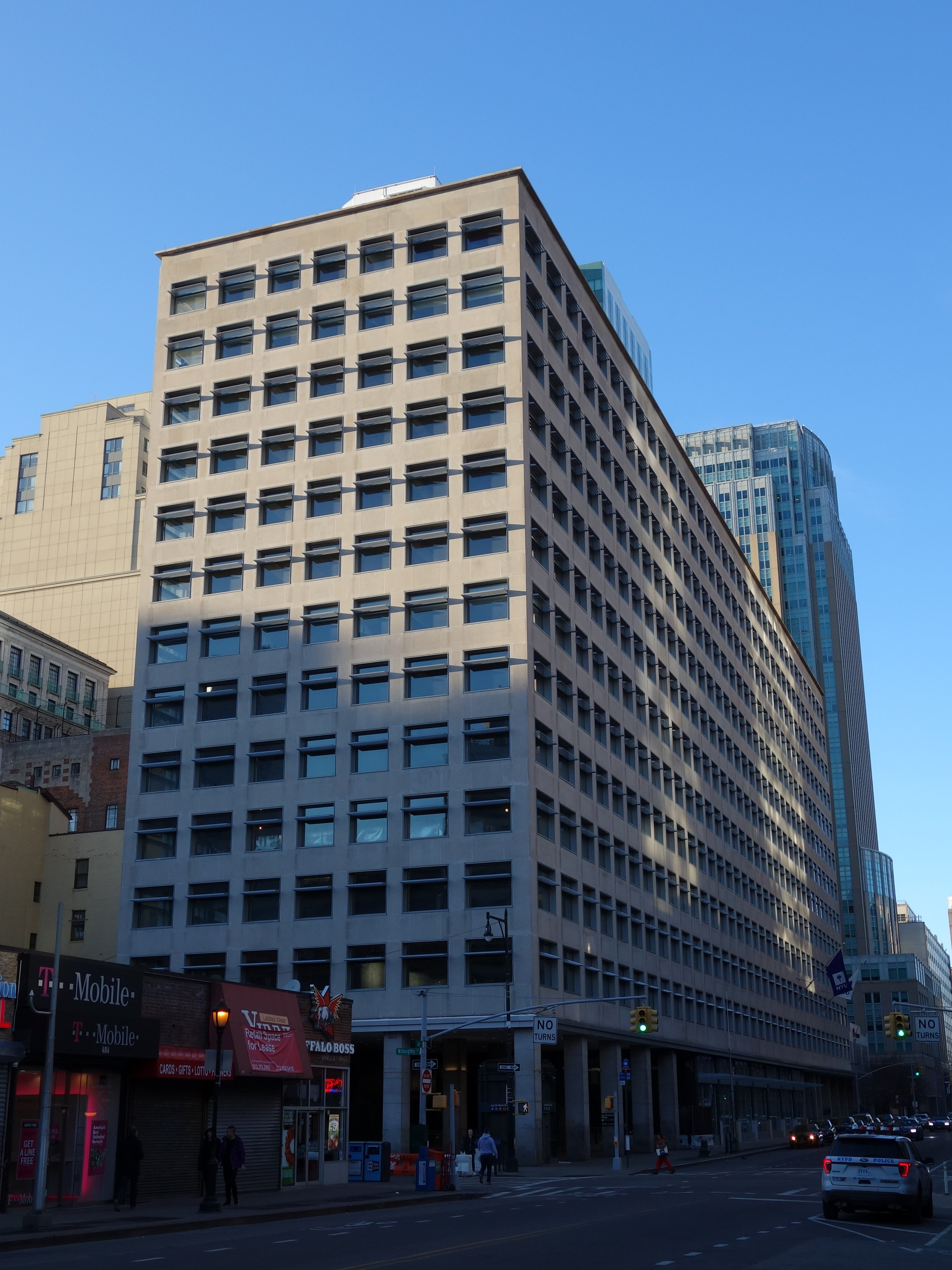
- 370 Jay Street in March 2018

General information
- Type: Office
- Architectural style: Modernist
- Location: 370 Jay Street; Brooklyn, NY; 11201; United States
- Coordinates: 40.692804°N 73.987731°W
- Completed: 1951
- Renovated: 2015−2017
- Owner: City of New York

Technical details
- Floor count: 13

Design and construction
- Architects: William Haugaard and Andrew J. Thomas

Renovating team
- Renovating firm: Mitchell−Giurgola Architects

370 Jay Street, also called the Transportation Building or Transit Building, is a building located at the northwest corner of Jay Street and Willoughby Street within the MetroTech Center complex in Downtown Brooklyn, New York City. The site is bounded by Pearl Street to the west, and was formerly bound by Myrtle Avenue at its north end; this portion of the street has since been de-mapped.

The site has historically served as the headquarters for the operating agency of the New York City Transit System, built by the New York City Board of Transportation (BOT). After 1953, it housed the New York City Transit Authority and Metropolitan Transportation Authority (MTA), which succeeded the BOT. The building is notable for housing the revenue-collecting operations of the New York City Subway, performed by money trains on nearby subway lines, which were connected to the lower levels of the building via passageways.

The building is one of the earliest modernist buildings in the city. When it opened in the 1950s Lewis Mumford praised it for its design, and architect Robert A. M. Stern in the 1990s considered it a historic building and potential landmark. In recent times, however, the building has been viewed as an "eyesore" within the Downtown Brooklyn landscape, and has fallen into disrepair as the MTA has gradually vacated the building since 1990. In 2012, New York University (NYU) reached an agreement with the MTA to take over the building and renovate and restore it to become part of its Brooklyn Campus. NYU started moving into 370 Jay Street in 2017. The building is now home to the Center for Urban Science and Progress, classrooms, and a cafeteria.

== Design ==
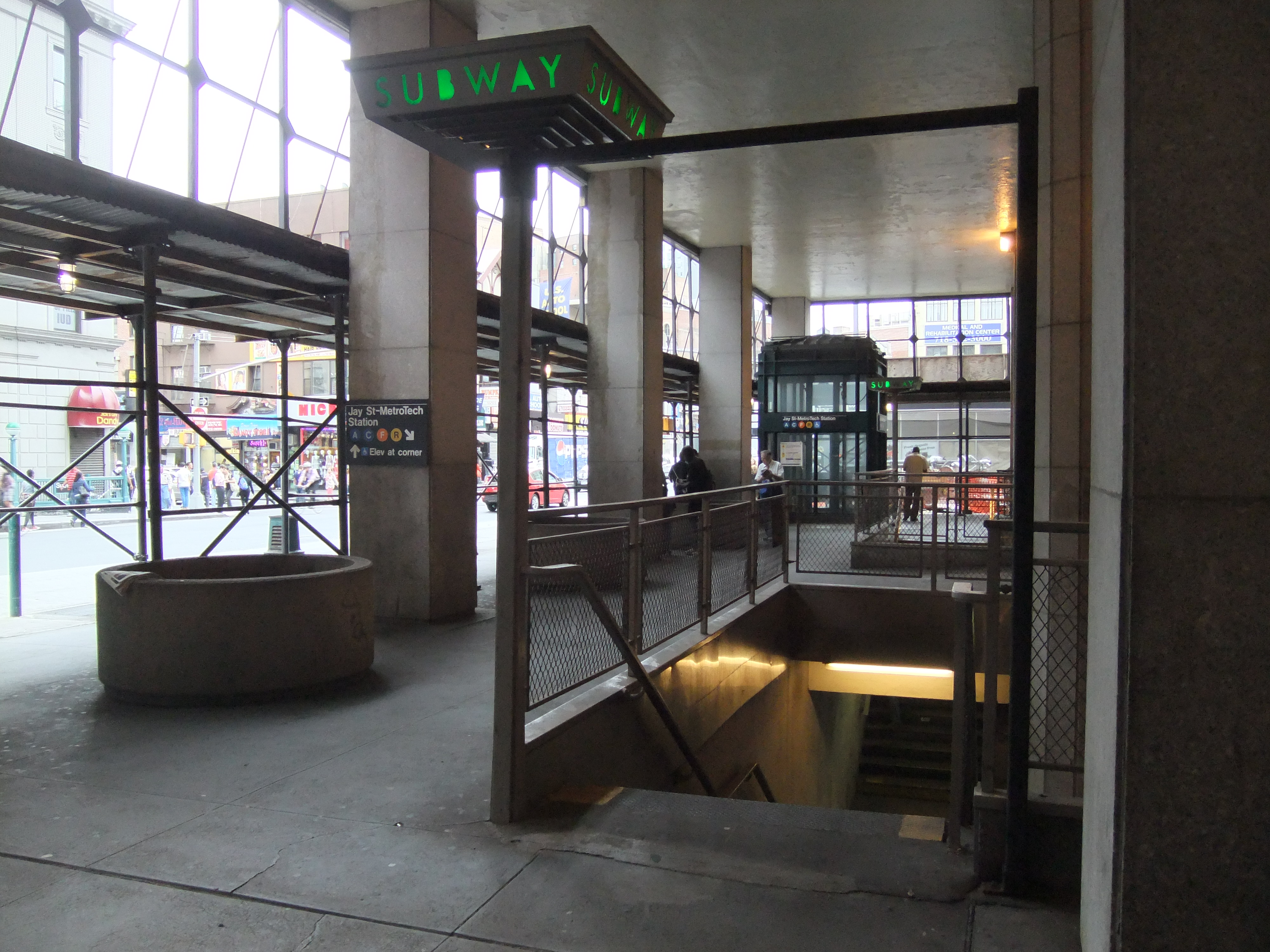
An entrance to the Jay Street–MetroTech subway complex within the arcade of 370 Jay Street.

The 13-story building was designed by architects William Haugaard and Andrew J. Thomas in the post-World War II modernist style. The building was originally designed prior to World War II, and was envisioned in the Art Deco style. The building is L-shaped, the long side along Jay Street, and the short perpendicular side along the former Myrtle Avenue. The Myrtle Avenue portion of the building is six-stories high, due to zoning restrictions at the time of the building's construction. The right-of-way of Myrtle Avenue has since been turned into a pedestrian plaza, known as Brooklyn Renaissance Plaza.

A small portion of the building has three additional mechanical floors. A loading dock for the building and the entrance to its basement parking facilities is located at the north end of Pearl Street.

The building is designed as a cube with flat sides and a flat roof. The roof has a narrow Monel cornice. The outer facade of the building consists of white limestone, five inches thick, with over 1,000 identical square and uniformly-arranged casement windows. These windows are laid out flush to the outer wall of the building. The windows allowed for the circulation of natural light into the building. The ground level of the building at Jay and Wiloughby Streets is designed with numerous "Corbusian" pilotis forming a semi-open-air arcade, a common characteristic of modern-style buildings. A second arcade is located at the north end of the building at Jay Street and Renaissance Plaza.

=== Features ===
Until 2015, one of the walls of the south arcade featured a 15-foot granite relief commemorating the transportation employees who fought in World War II. The relief depicts a map displaying the battle sites of the war, with the names of 85 workers who took part in those battles listed. It consists of 12 granite panels, each measuring five feet wide, 3.5 feet high, two inches thick and weighing 500 pounds. The relief was located inside the building's lobby until 1995, when it was moved to the outdoor arcade after reorganizing within the building left it obstructed from view. The memorial has since been moved to the nearby New York City Transit Authority headquarters, two blocks south at Livingston and Smith Streets.

Within both arcades and adjacent to the building are several entrances to the Jay Street–MetroTech subway complex, which consisted of two separate stations when the building was constructed. The entrances include several escalators, and the southern arcade features an elevator to the station. The unique entrance lamps featured at these subway entrances were installed along with the building, and designed in Art Deco/Art Moderne style. The foundations of the building were built on top of the IND portion of the complex, which was constructed to be able to support a heavy building on top of it. The supports for the building consist of a structural steel frame and reinforced concrete. The location was selected in order to be in close proximity to the lines of all three subway divisions (IRT, BMT, IND) in order to collect fares (including tokens and cash) via money train. Passageways from the subway stations, including a visible door in the Jay Street IND station, lead to a money sorting room in the basement of the building. Fare collection and transport was originally performed using armored trucks, and the money trains were replaced by armored trucks in 2006.

Inside the building are 10 high-speed elevators installed by the Otis Elevator Company. The elevators were among the first to use the company's electronic control system, the Otis Autotronic system.

== Use ==
The building was intended as the central headquarters of the New York City Board of Transportation in order to house 2,500 employees from several divisions of the board including its executive, legal, and engineering staffs. The remainder of the building not used by the BOT would be rented out. Among the operations within the building was the New York City Subway's Command Center, a centralized room on the third floor of the building used to monitor the signaling of the system. The command center has since been moved to a site in Midtown Manhattan. The upper mechanical floors housed the telephone exchange for the BOT and later the Transit Authority, the largest in the city at the time of its construction. Rented facilities included a bank (occupied by Citibank) and restaurant at ground level, which have since closed.

== Location ==
The building is adjacent to the Brooklyn Friends School (occupying the former Brooklyn Law School building) and the Pearl Street campus of ASA College. To the north across Renaissance Plaza is the 355 Jay Street office building, which also houses New York Marriott Brooklyn, or the Brooklyn Bridge Hotel. Marriott owns the plaza. Across from the building to the east is One MetroTech Center, while the campus of the New York University Tandon School of Engineering is just north across the Myrtle Avenue Promenade.

== History ==
=== Design and construction ===
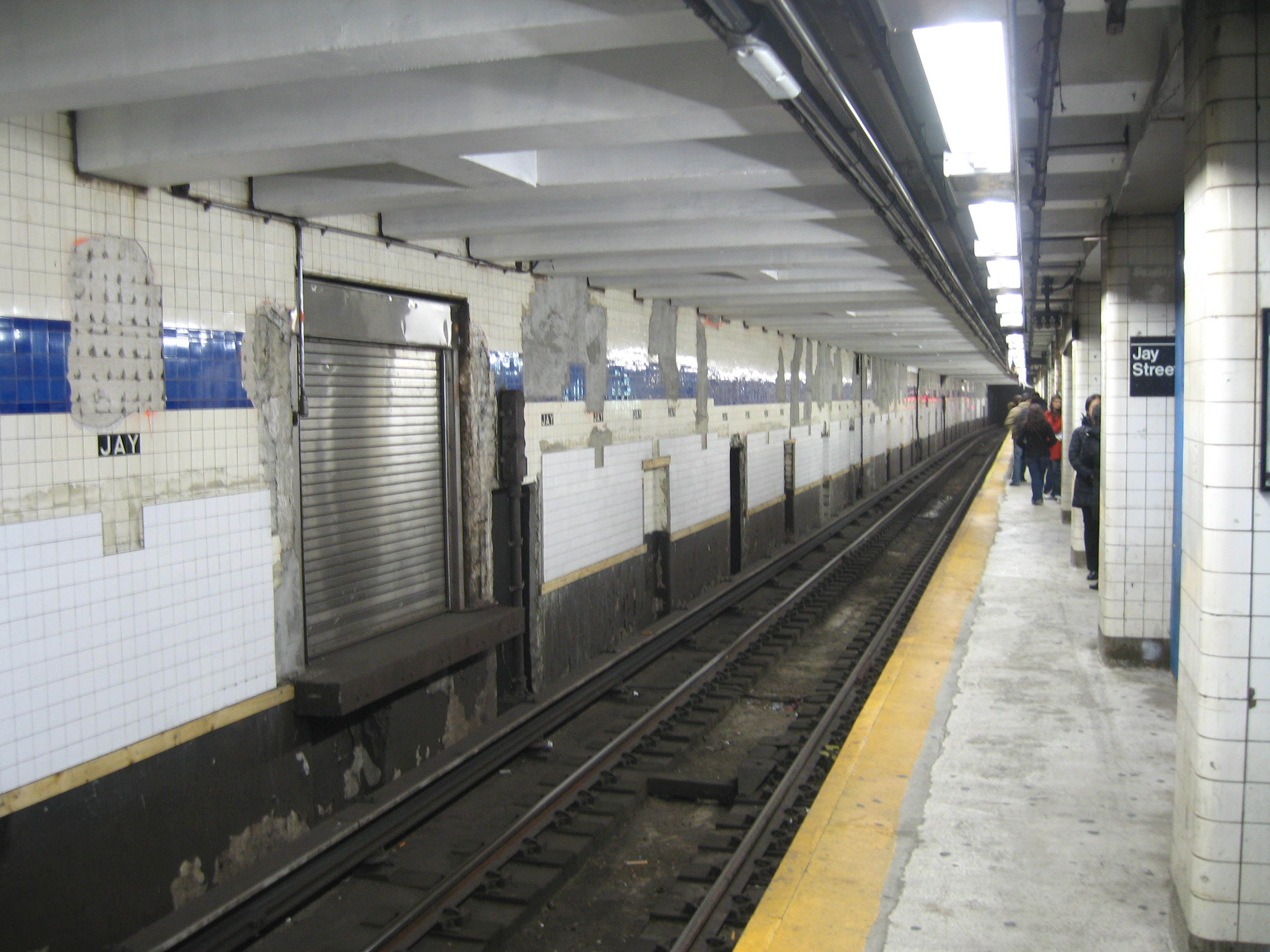
The "money train" door in the Jay Street IND station, leading to 370 Jay Street's money sorting room.

In 1938, the Board of Transportation began plans to relocate to a central headquarters. Architectural firm Eggers & Higgins drafted the original plans for the new Board of Transportation headquarters in 1939, originally projected to cost $3.6 million. The site at Jay and Willoughby Streets was initially condemned in 1928 for the construction of the Jay Street–Borough Hall station of the Independent Subway System (IND), with a parking lot created on the site. It was sold to a realty company involved in the building's construction by the New York City Board of Estimate at the cost of $365,000. The site was selected in anticipation of the unification of the transit system, which would occur one year later. The contract for the building was awarded to the George A. Fuller Company. Construction of the building did not commence, however, due to the onset of World War II.

New plans were drafted by William Haugaard in 1948. The original design was altered, including changes to the outer facade and the addition of the arcades at both ends of the structure. The building was now being constructed as part of the greater Brooklyn Civic Center, with several other government buildings also being erected in the surrounding area. Ground broke on the site on October 8, 1948. The building was erected at a time when many other BOT transit facilities were also being built. The headquarters opened on April 1, 1951, over two years after the death of Haugaard. It cost $10 million to construct. The BOT proceeded to vacate its former headquarters, one at Hudson Street at the entrance to the Holland Tunnel in Hudson Square, Manhattan, and the other in the former Paramount Theatre in Downtown Brooklyn. On May 8, 1952, the subway entrances between the building's arcades and the Jay Street IND station, including the four escalators, were completed.

In a column for The New Yorker published April 25, 1953, architectural critic Lewis Mumford praised the building's design, calling it "the very model of an efficient office building. Not a cathedral of commerce, not a temple of advertising, not a palace of municipal power: just a group of offices arranged for the efficient dispatch of administration."

=== Use after dissolution of BOT ===
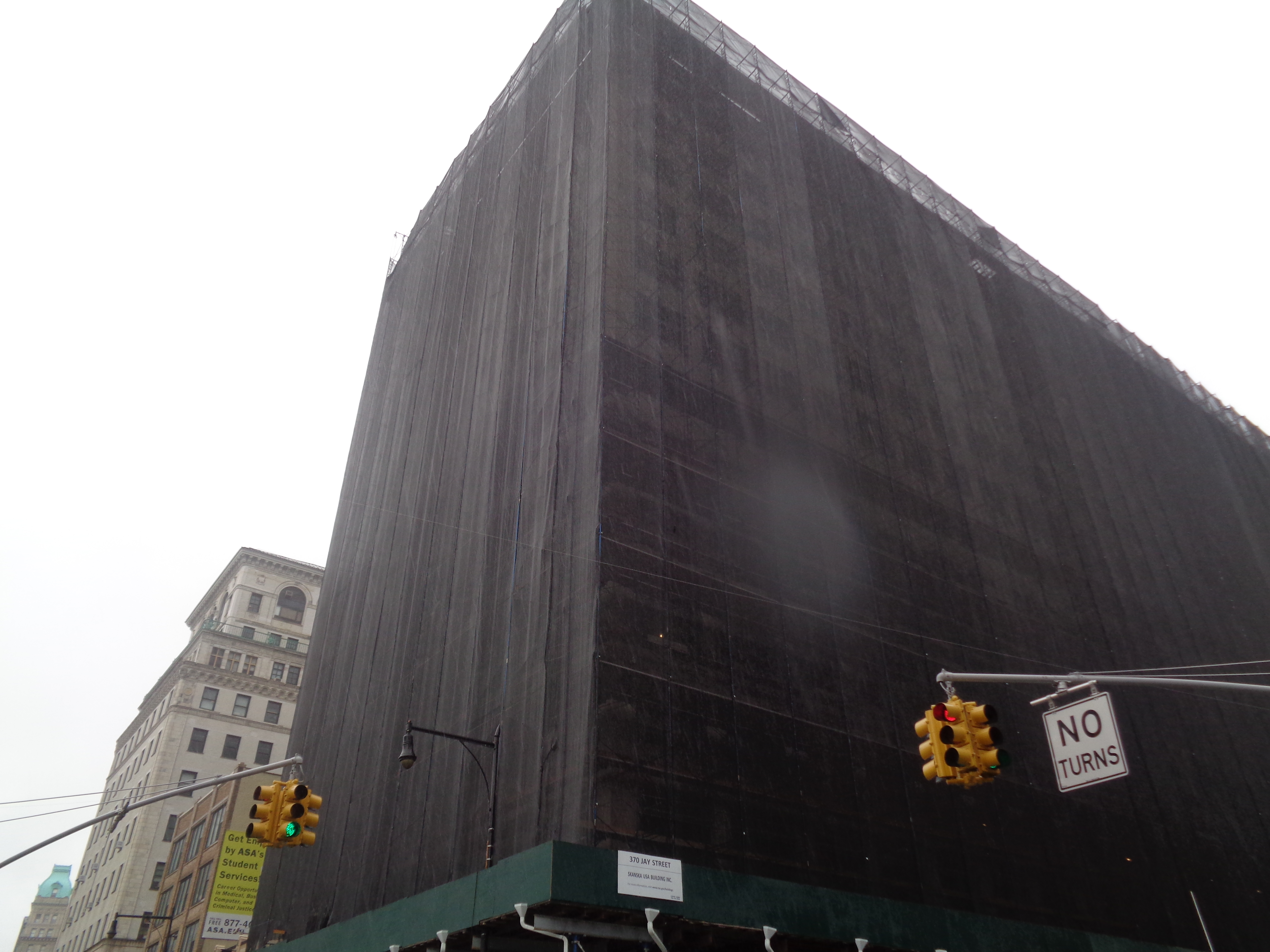
370 Jay Street undergoing renovations in 2016.

Following the dissolution of the BOT in June 1953, the building was taken over by the BOT's successors the New York City Transit Authority, who used the building as their headquarters. The Transit Authority became part of what is now the MTA in 1968, with the MTA also using the building as its center of operations. Some office space was rented out to other organizations including the New York City Police Department. In 1990, the Transit Authority moved its primary headquarters out of 370 Jay Street, to its current location at 130 Livingston Street. Beginning in 1998, additional MTA operations were moved out of the building into 2 Broadway in Lower Manhattan, with the MTA signing a 49-year lease to use 2 Broadway as its central headquarters. In January 2006, the money train operations ended, after which the MTA largely vacated the site. Following the MTA's exit, the building remained mostly vacant and fell into disrepair, often surrounded by scaffolding. It has been criticized for its dilapidated state, and for its simple and uniform design in contrast to the surrounding buildings. Critics of the building included Brooklyn borough president Marty Markowitz.

On April 23, 2012, the MTA agreed to eventually turn the building over to New York University (NYU), with the university planning to convert the site for use as part of its Brooklyn Campus. The building will primarily house the Center for Urban Science and Progress. The original futuristic design plan for the renovation was submitted to the applied sciences competition held by mayor Michael Bloomberg and the New York City Economic Development Corporation, the same competition that led to the establishment of the Cornell Tech campus on Roosevelt Island. The original NYU design for 370 Jay Street included a "high-tech, high-performance" outer facade of glass and steel using recycled materials to improve temperature insulation, along with other energy efficient features. NYU was awarded a 99-year lease of the building. In 2014, however, NYU altered its plans to lower costs. This new redesign was created by Mitchell−Giurgola Architects. The original limestone facade, which had darkened due to age and lack of maintenance, would be restored to its original white shade. The overhaul utilized many green features, including energy-efficient windows, and a wind turbine and green roof. Renovations began in March 2015.

On October 1, 2014, MTA officials unearthed a "time capsule" at the northeast corner of the building. The capsule, a metal chest placed in a small crypt beneath a paving stone, was filled with microfilm records of the building's construction, a newspaper article, and nickel (representing the transit fare at the time the building was built) in October 1949, and was buried in 1950. The contents were found to be damaged by water when they were removed. As part of the NYU renovation, the MTA relocated the World War II memorial to 130 Livingston Street in June 2015, and held a re-dedication ceremony in August 2015. NYU started moving into the building on December 13, 2017, at which time the renovation was expected to be completed by 2019.
