= Brooklyn Commons =

Business and educational center in New York City

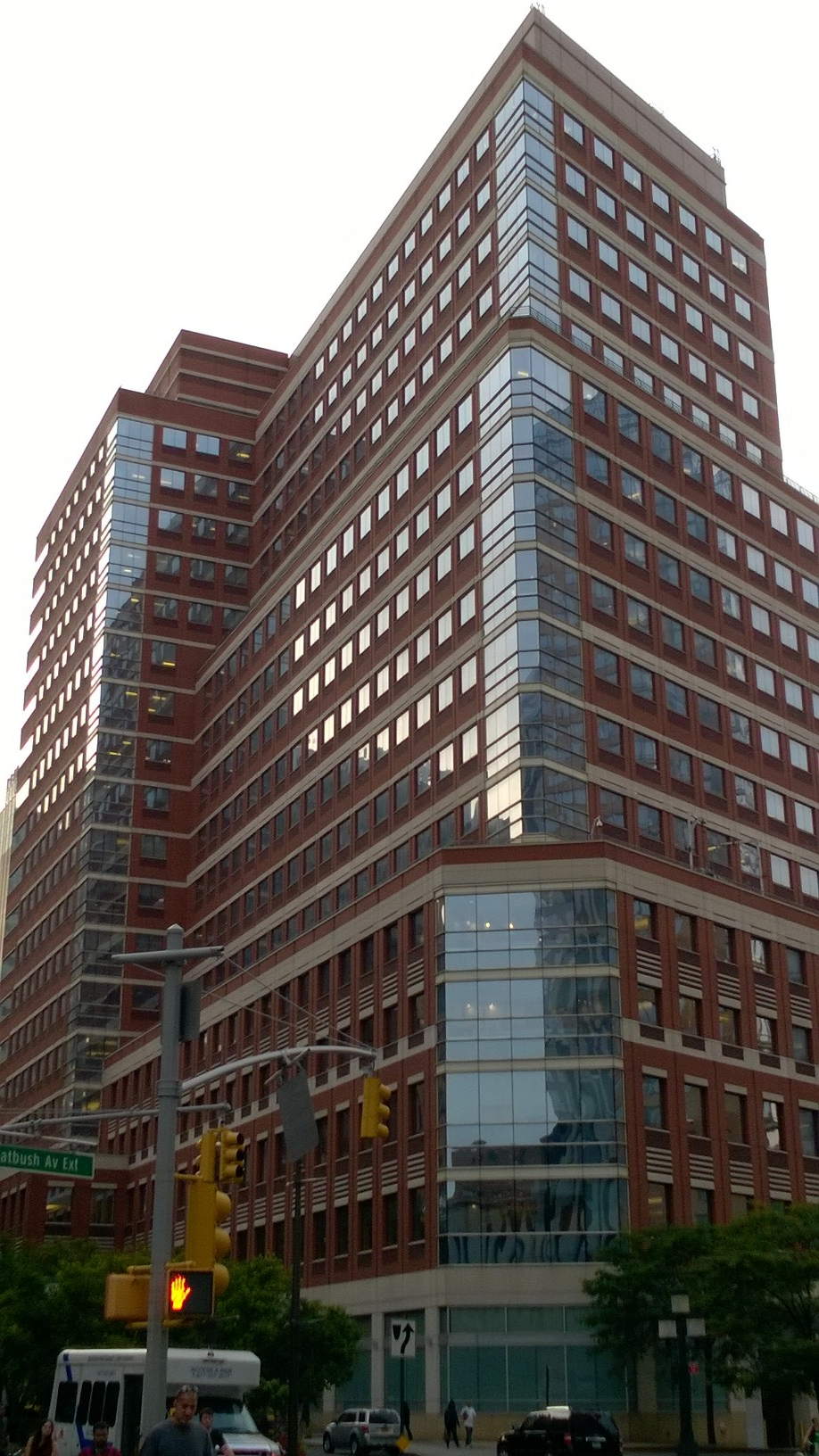
- The office building of 115 Myrtle Avenue
- Interactive map of the Brooklyn Commons area
- Alternative names: Brooklyn Commons at Metrotech Center

General information
- Location: 100 Myrtle Avenue; Brooklyn, New York
- Coordinates: 40°41'39.69"N, 73°59'9.48"W 40.694358°N 73.985968°W
- Owner: Brookfield Properties

Website
- brooklyncommons.com

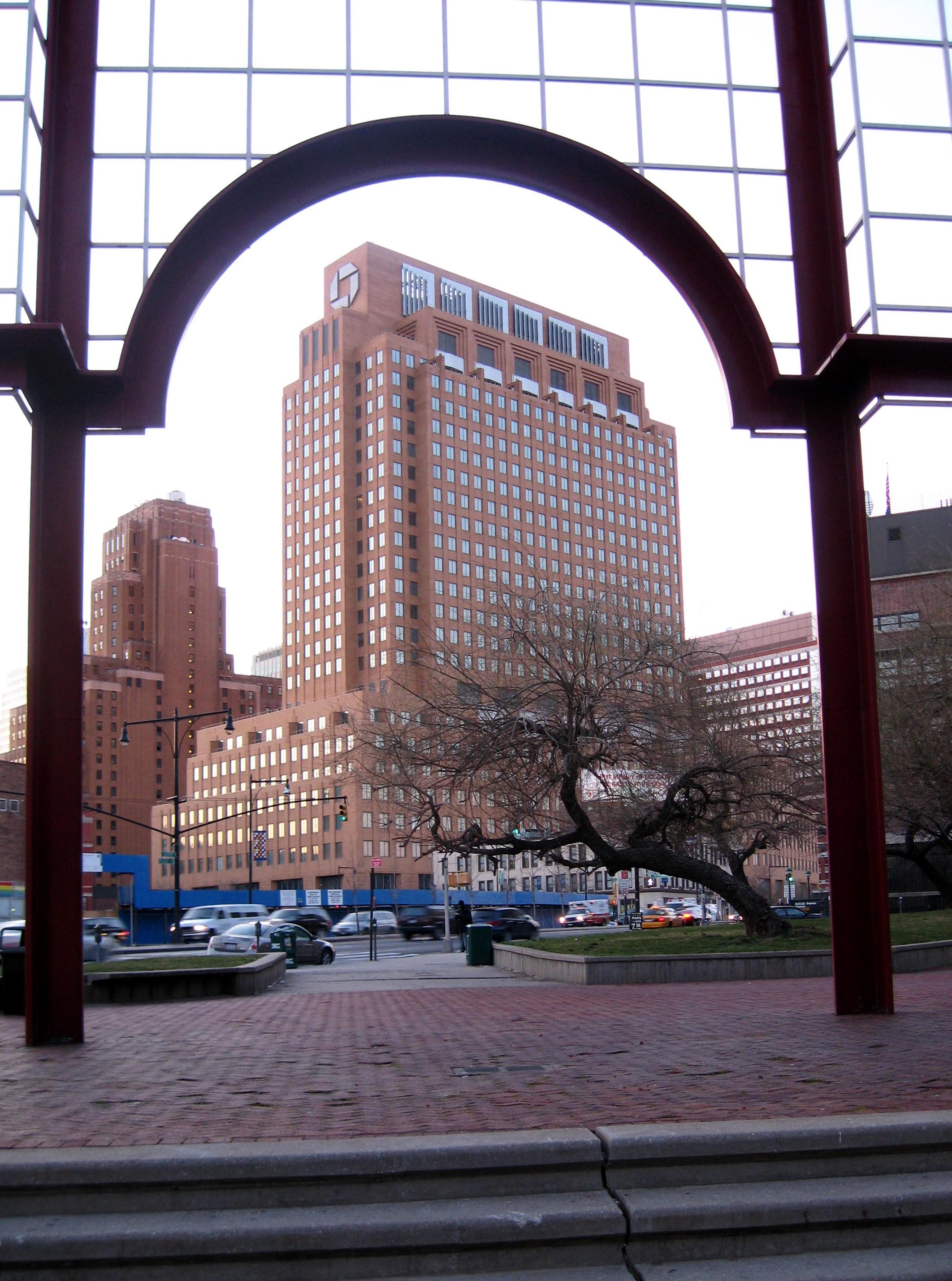
Chase Bank building. This is 4 MetroTech Center. It is the second oldest building in the complex, followed by 1 MetroTech Center, the oldest. This building opened in 1993, and is located on Flatbush Avenue partially (the Western end). Much like 1 MetroTech Center used to have until years ago with its blue lights on the trapezoid fitting (on the roof) windows, the Chase logos on both the west and east side of this building used to light up (white) at night, and the frames used to light up yellow too. This stopped around 2003 (although the frames occasionally lit up during the years). At night the only lighting is the red antenna lights on the roof. The building is engulfed in darkness at night.

Brooklyn Commons, formerly MetroTech Center, is a business and educational center in Downtown Brooklyn, New York City.

== Location ==
Brooklyn Commons lies between Flatbush Avenue Extension and Jay Street, north of the Fulton Street Mall and south of Tillary Street, close to Brooklyn's Civic Center (Borough Hall and the courts) and Brooklyn Heights. The complex is above the Jay Street–MetroTech station of the New York City Subway, served by the A, C, F, <F>, and R trains.

It is the nation's largest urban academic-industrial research park.

== History ==
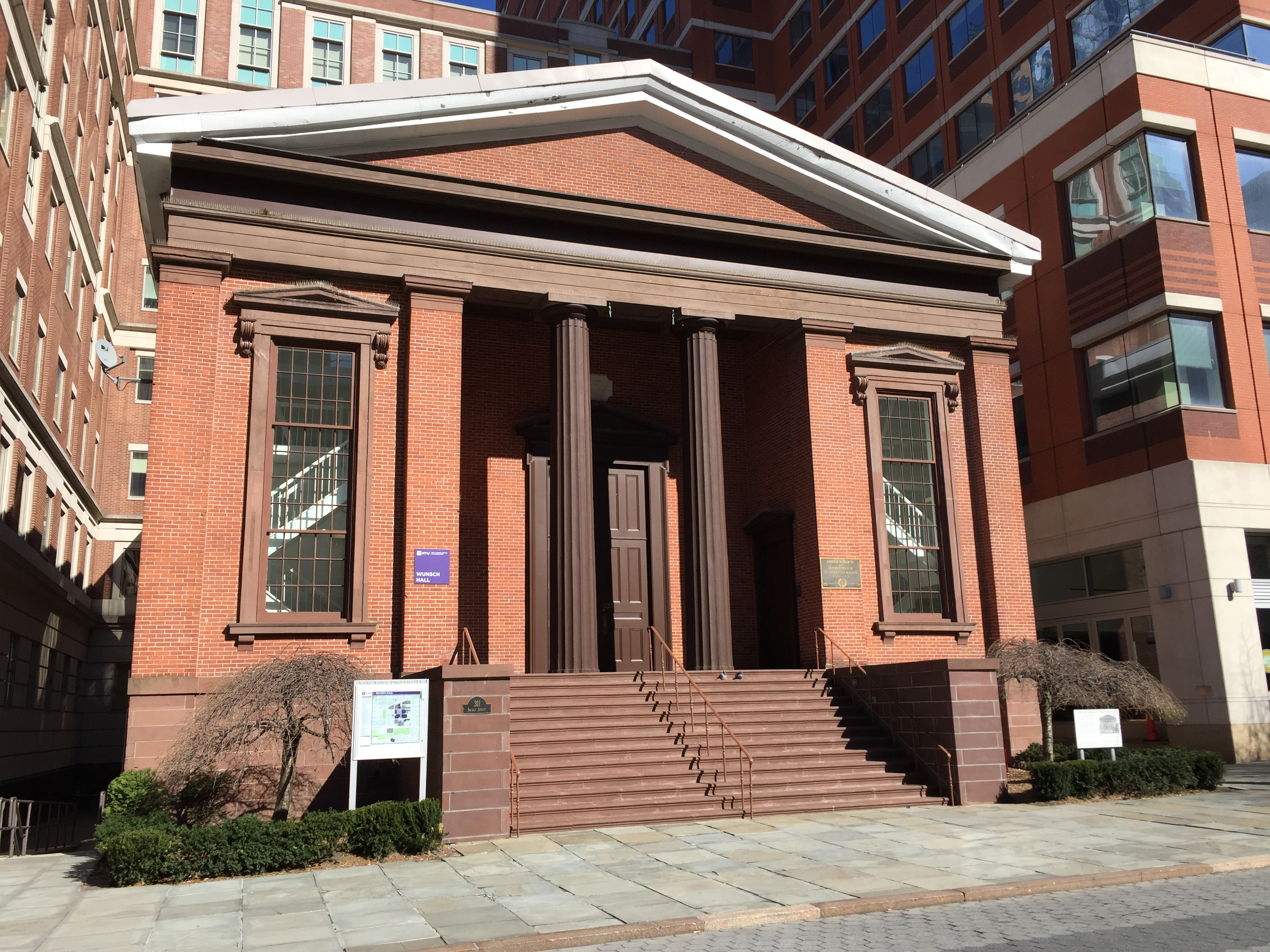
Former church at east end of plaza, now part of NYU

The 1980s and 1990s were a period of major large-scale development activity and renewal in Downtown Brooklyn. The MetroTech Center office complex was at the center of this revitalization and within walking distance of several other major development projects including Pierrepont Plaza, the Marriott at the Brooklyn Bridge, Atlantic Terminal Mall, and Renaissance Plaza. MetroTech was controversial when it was created because it involved the demolition of over 100 homes and 50 businesses.

As part of an effort to resuscitate Downtown Brooklyn in the 1970s, George Bugliarello, a professor at the nearby Polytechnic Institute, had advanced an idea to create a center for research and development along the lines of the development then starting in Silicon Valley in California. About a decade later the American Institute of Aeronautics and Astronautics, like several other scientific and engineering organizations, was unsuccessfully seeking locations for expansion in Manhattan matching their needs and budget. When the AIAA chose to relocate to Washington D.C. due to lack of suitable space in New York, Bugliarello, who had by then become the President of Polytechnic, decided to try again to put his idea of a technology-centered development in Brooklyn into action.

A few years later, New York City agreed to designate what had then become Polytechnic University as the main sponsor of the urban renewal project that would become MetroTech, under the condition that there would be at least two other tenants. The city and Polytechnic chose Forest City Enterprises as the project's main developer based on its years of experience, commitment to stay in the area, and financial capacity. Forest City's co-founder Bruce Ratner and Brooklyn Borough President Howard Golden put together a public-private partnership and quickly redefined the MetroTech vision from a research and development park to a campus-centered back-office complex.

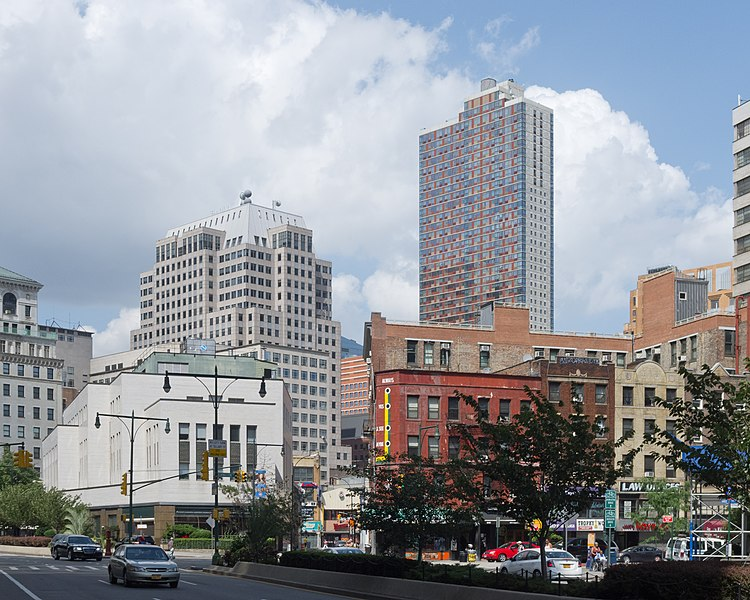
1 MetroTech Center (to the left), one of the original buildings of the complex. It was opened in 1992. 4 MetroTech Center and the Brooklyn Telephone Building can be seen to the right, although a building in front covers their view. The building has an industrial trapezoid shape partially enclosing the roof, and has windows, and used to have blue lights at night from light bulbs on those very windows. The shape has no ceiling as is it is the roof.

As Forest City negotiated with Morgan Stanley, two other major corporate players were being considered for the site: the Securities Industry Automation Corporation (SIAC) and Brooklyn Union Gas. SIAC decided to move to MetroTech because the site was on a separate power grid from Manhattan's, which meant their operations would be safe if Manhattan experienced a power failure, as had happened in the New York City blackout of 1977. The move that sealed the decision to build the MetroTech vision begun by Bugliarello was convincing Chase Manhattan Bank (now JPMorgan Chase) to relocate its back-office operations there.

MetroTech Center was formed in 1992 by making a 16-acre (65,000 m^{2}) rectangle of downtown Brooklyn into a superblock (bounded by Jay Street, Johnson Street, Flatbush Avenue, and Myrtle Avenue), to allow the erection of new office buildings and parking garages. Dozens of older buildings had to be demolished in order to clear this space for the construction of the new center. The entire area was designated a pedestrian zone, and, as a consequence, the north ends of Lawrence and Duffield Streets were closed to automobile traffic.

From 2000 to 2016, the MetroTech complex generated more than $1 billion in new investment, representing more than five million square feet of new space. In 2017, New York University announced that it would invest over $500 million in its Brooklyn Campus that mainly includes the NYU Tandon School of Engineering and Center for Urban Science and Progress.

In 2018, Brookfield Properties purchased the MetroTech complex. In 2022, Brookfield Properties announced that MetroTech would be renamed Brooklyn Commons. The private plaza at MetroTech Commons was renamed Brooklyn Commons Park, and James Corner Field Operations was hired to renovate the plaza. Brookfield also announced that One MetroTech, Two MetroTech, and Fifteen MetroTech would be substantially renovated, with new lobbies, retail spaces, and terraces. The work was budgeted at $50 million, and the project was scheduled to be completed in 2023.

== Brooklyn Commons Park ==
Brooklyn Commons Park (formerly MetroTech Commons) is the 3.5-acre (14,000 m^{2}) privately owned public space at the heart of the Brooklyn Commons complex. It hosts events including concerts, health fairs, chess tournaments and holiday celebrations. Theater performances, an ice-skating rink, and children's activities are also offered at the facility.

Bounded by Lawrence and Duffield Streets, the square is frequently adorned by modern art exhibits. Two pieces called Alligator and Visionary are part of the Commons' permanent public art collection. Designed by sculptor Tom Otterness, they were installed in 1998.

== Notable tenants ==
The early occupants included JPMorgan Chase, the New York City Fire Department, the New York City Department of Information Technology and Telecommunications, Verizon Human Resources, Keyspan Energy (now National Grid), Empire Blue Cross Blue Shield, the New York City College of Technology and the New York University Tandon School of Engineering. Later tenants include MakerBot Industries, the Brooklyn Nets, Slate magazine, the Ms. Foundation for Women, El Diario La Prensa, Robert Half International, and UniWorld Group. The NYU Tandon School of Engineering, previously named Polytechnic Institute, and later Polytechnic University, was one of MetroTech's founding institutions. The Marriott Hotel at Brooklyn Bridge is located across Jay Street. The MetroTech Business Improvement District, a non-profit organization, provides sanitation, marketing, and events programming services.

- ImpreMedia has its headquarters on the 18th floor of 1 MetroTech Center. El Diario La Prensa, a newspaper of ImpreMedia, has its offices on the same floor.
- MakerBot Industries has its headquarters on the 21st floor of 1 MetroTech Center.
- National Grid, the gas utility company, has offices in the MetroTech complex.
- The New York City Fire Department has its headquarters in 9 MetroTech Center, which has eight stories and 360,000 square feet (33,000 m^{2}) of space.
- New York University's Engineering campus includes 2, 5, and 6 MetroTech Center, as well as the building at 370 Jay Street, within MetroTech Center.
- TransCare Corporation had its headquarters in 1 MetroTech Center.
