= Money train =

Armored fare collection rail vehicle

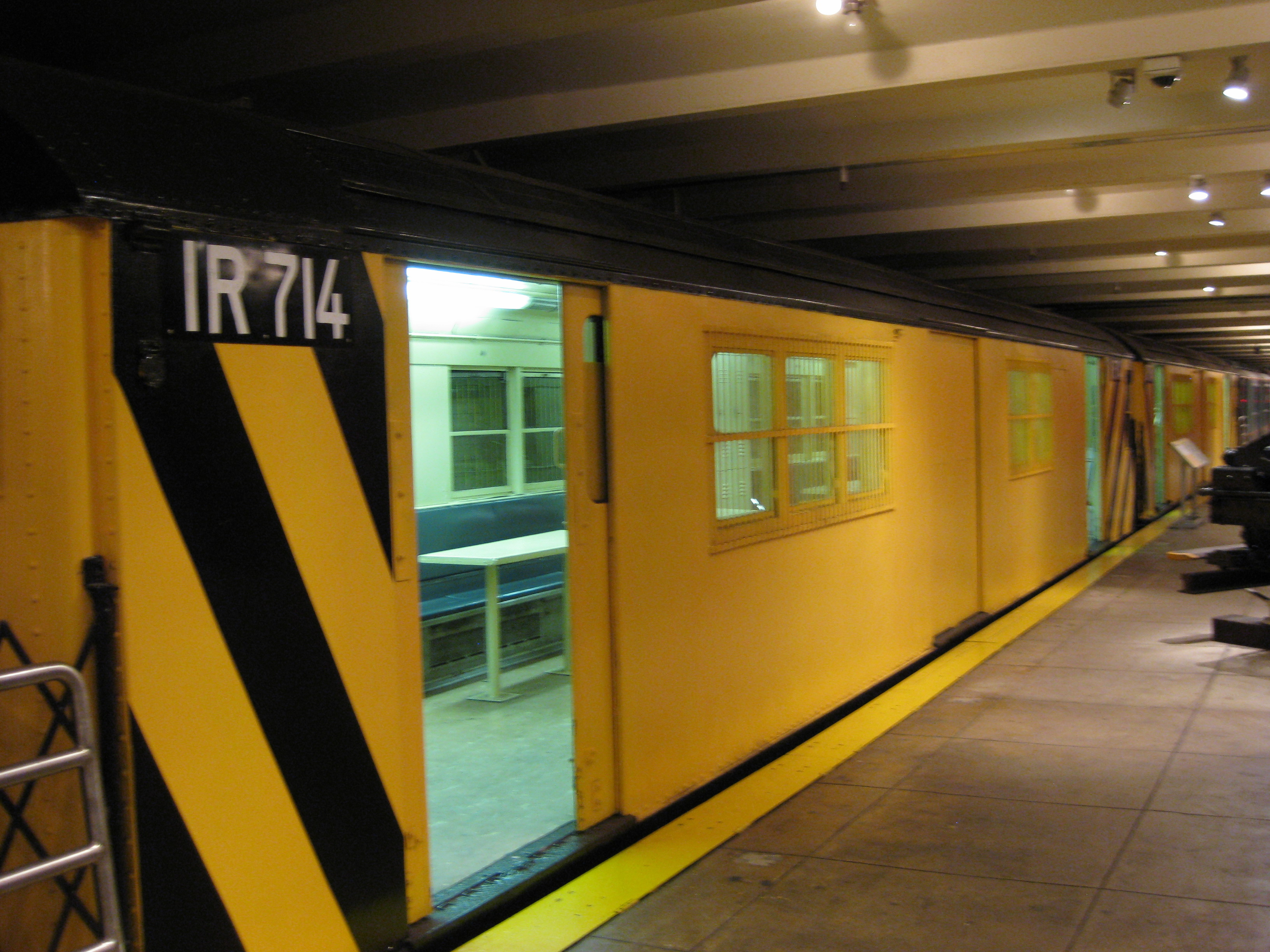
An R95 Revenue Car at the New York Transit Museum. The car was used by the New York City Subway until 2006.

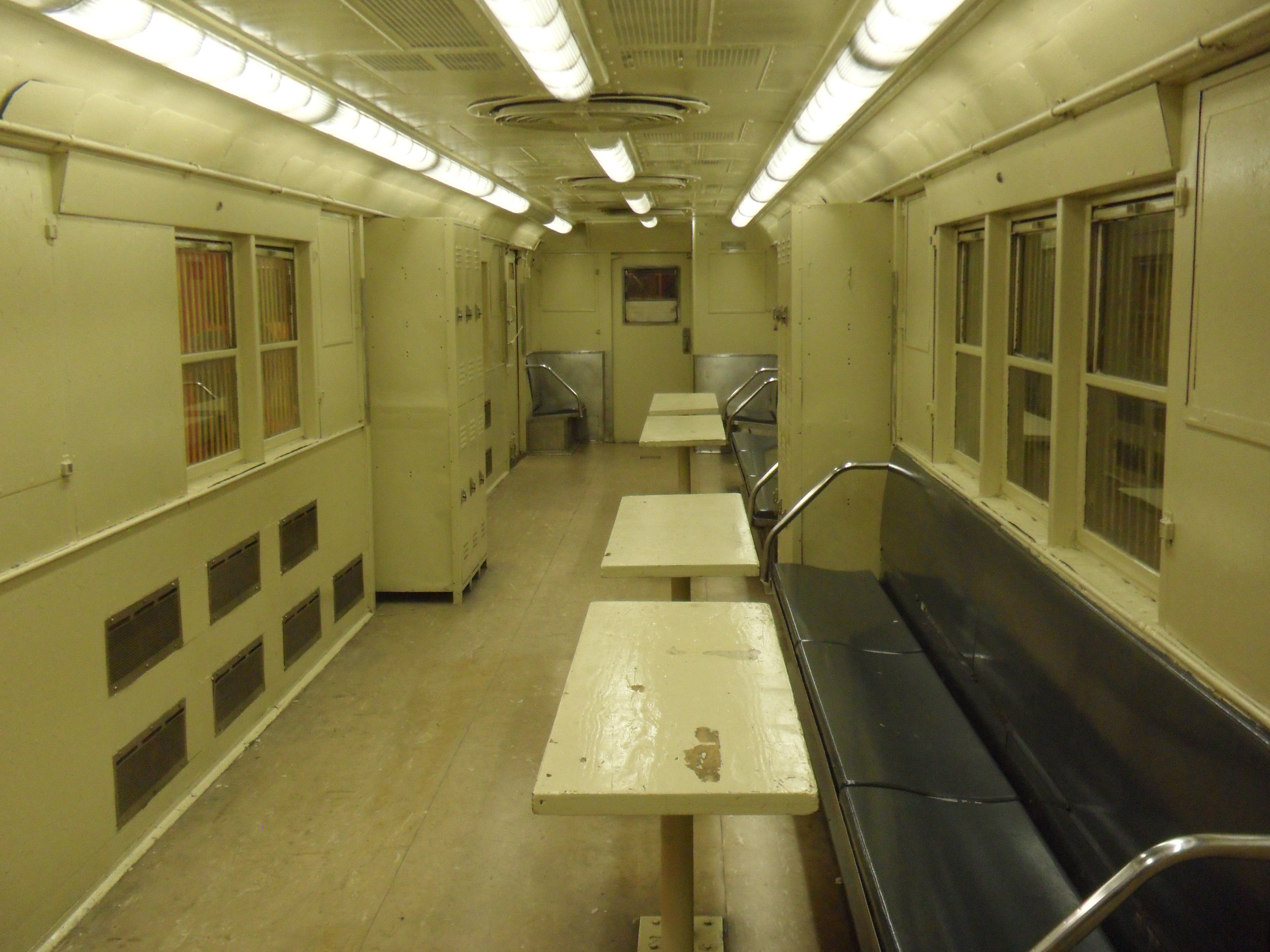
Interior of the same car

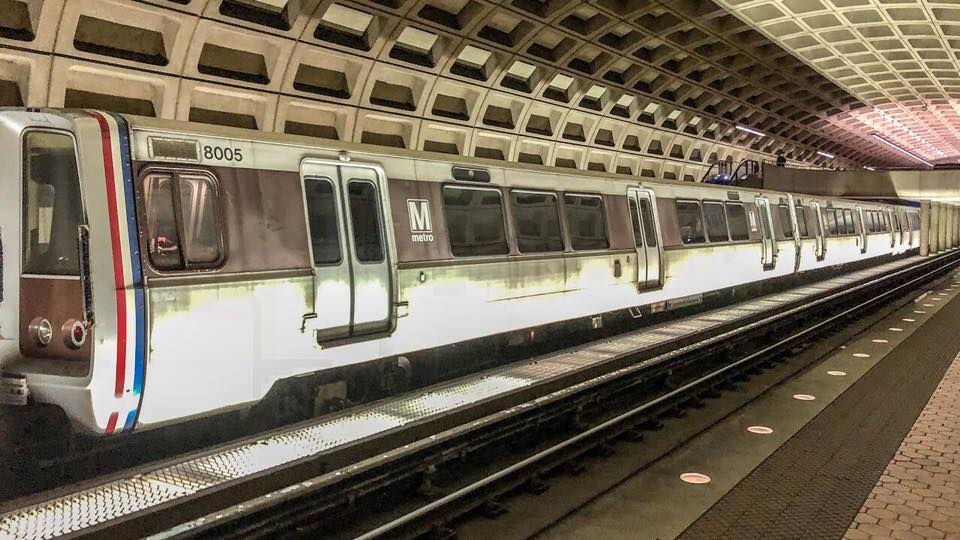
A money train on the Washington, DC metro system. Its cars are converted passenger railcars so it looks almost identical to other trains from the outside.

A money train is one or more railcars used to collect cash fare revenue from stations on a subway system and return it to a central location for processing. This train was typically used to carry money bags guarded by transit police to deter robberies.

On the New York City Subway, a "money train" was first mentioned in 1905, a year after the system opened. Their trains were converted from subway cars that had been removed from passenger service. This has since been discontinued, with the last service running in January 2006.

Singapore's Mass Rapid Transit system introduced a money train (cash train) where a specially modified Driving Trailer car is coupled to a regular 4 car C151 train when the system was commissioned in 1987. They were used to transfer cash trolleys from stations to a counting facility at Bishan Depot.

The Light Rail in Hong Kong uses money trains, which are regular passenger trains taken out of service, to collect fares from the ticket vending machines.

== Pay car ==
In Australia, the reverse procedure occurred with the New South Wales Government Railways fleet of pay buses. A small self-powered railcar, they were used to deliver pay packets containing cash to employees at remote railway stations, as well as maintenance gangs working on the tracks. This operation remained in service until the 1980s when it was supplanted by electronic payments.
