= New York University Grossman School of Medicine =

Medical school of New York University

- Former names: Medical College of New York University (1841–1898); University and Bellevue Hospital Medical College of New York University (1898–1935); New York University College of Medicine (1935–1960); New York University School of Medicine (1960–2019)
- Type: Private medical school
- Established: 1841; 185 years ago
- Parent institution: New York University
- Dean: Alec C. Kimmelman
- Location: New York City, New York, U.S. 40.74205°N 73.97444°W
- Campus: Urban
- Colors: Violet and white
- Website: med.nyu.edu

The New York University Grossman School of Medicine (previously the New York University School of Medicine from 1960 to 2019) is one of the two medical schools of New York University, the other being NYU Grossman Long Island School of Medicine. Both are part of NYU Langone Health. The school was founded in 1841.

== History ==
The school was founded in 1841 as the Medical College of the University of New York, with an inaugural class of 239 students. Among the college's six original faculty members were renowned surgeon Valentine Mott and John Revere, son of Paul Revere. In 1898, the Medical College of New York University consolidated with Bellevue Hospital Medical College, forming the University and Bellevue Hospital Medical College of New York University.

In 1935, the university and Bellevue Hospital Medical College was renamed the New York University College of Medicine. In 1960, New York University College of Medicine was renamed New York University School of Medicine.

The faculty and alumni of NYU Grossman School of Medicine have contributed to the control of tuberculosis, diphtheria, yellow fever, and sexually transmitted infections, as well as the development of vaccines for measles, rubella, hepatitis B, polio, and cancer; advances in the treatment and prevention of stroke and heart disease; and the introduction of minimally invasive surgical techniques. In the early 1980s, clinicians and researchers from NYU Grossman School of Medicine working at NYC Health + Hospitals/Bellevue were among the first to identify an alarming increase in Kaposi's sarcoma, opportunistic infections, and immune system failure among young gay men and alert health authorities to an imminent health catastrophe, soon to be known as HIV/AIDS.

NYU Grossman School of Medicine counts among its faculty and alumni four Nobel laureates:

- Otto Loewi (awarded 1936), who determined that the primary language of nerve cell communication is chemical rather than electrical
- Severo Ochoa (awarded 1959), who conducted landmark studies in biochemical genetics and nucleic acids
- Baruj Benacerraf (awarded 1980), who performed groundbreaking research on genetic regulation of the immune system
- Eric Kandel (awarded 2000), who discovered molecular processes that underlie learning and memory

In 2007, Robert I. Grossman, a neuroradiologist who had served as chair of NYU Langone Health's Department of Radiology since 2001, was appointed the 15th Dean of NYU School of Medicine and CEO of NYU Medical Center.

In 2010, the school introduced the program of "Curriculum for the 21st Century" (C21), a new curriculum that affords students earlier and more frequent interaction with patients and new learning pathways with more opportunities for specialized training in areas best suited to their interests.

In 2013, the school established an accelerated three-year M.D. pathway that allows select medical students to graduate early, easing their financial burden while providing a direct route into one of twenty residency programs and enabling faster entry into various medical specialties.

In 2018, the school implemented full-tuition scholarships for all current and future students in its M.D. degree program, making NYU Grossman School of Medicine the first top-ranked medical school in the nation to provide full-tuition scholarships to all of its students.

On November 6, 2019, the New York University School of Medicine was renamed the New York University Robert I. Grossman School of Medicine in honor of Robert I. Grossman, the school dean at the time.

In 2023, NYU Grossman School of Medicine introduced its 3+1 curriculum, allowing every student to graduate in three years or choose an optional fourth year to pursue research or one of several dual degrees that combine an MD with a master's degree.

A 2024 study published in Academic Medicine and led by Joan F. Cangiarella, Executive Vice President and Vice Dean for Education, Faculty, and Academic Affairs, Chief Academic Officer, found that graduates of three-year medical school programs performed as well on tests of skill and knowledge as their peers in traditional four-year programs.

In 2025, Alec C. Kimmelman, MD, PhD, a physician and researcher, was appointed Dean of NYU Grossman School of Medicine the 16th CEO of NYU Langone Health.

== Curriculum ==
NYU Grossman School of Medicine has 29 academic departments in the clinical and basic sciences. Its curriculum includes three main tracks:

- Three-Year MD pathway: Provides pre-clinical and clinical studies in three years and incorporates a year-long integrative pre-clerkship experience, with clerkships beginning in the second year. Graduates can apply to any residency program in the country.
- Three-Year MD with a directed pathway to residency NYU Grossman School of Medicine: Provides pre-clinical and clinical studies in three years, with a directed pathway to any of NYU Grossman School of Medicine's 29 residency programs.
- Four-Year MD/Master's dual-degree or MD/research year pathways: Students earn an MD in three years with the option to pursue a fourth year for research or to earn a master's degree along with their medical degree.

The School's joint degree programs include:

- MD/MPA in Health Policy and Management (with the Robert F. Wagner Graduate School of Public Service)
- MD/MPH in Global Health (with the NYU School of Global Public Health's programs on Global Health Leadership)
- MD/MA in bioethics (with the NYU School of Global Public Health)
- MD/MSCI In Clinical Investigation (with NYU Grossman School of Medicine)
- MD/MBA in General Management (with the New York University Stern School of Business)
- MD/MSBI in Biomedical Informatics (with the NYU Grossman School of Medicine's Vilcek Institute of Graduate Biomedical Sciences)

=== Admissions ===
For the MD Class of 2025, 8,385 candidates applied and 102 were admitted.

== Milestones ==
- 1846: New York Academy of Medicine is founded by New York University Medical College faculty members Lewis Sayre, Gunning S. Bedford, and others
- 1854: Human dissection is legalized in New York State to make more cadavers available for medical study, due to lobbying efforts by John W. Draper, a cofounder of New York University Medical College and president of the medical faculty
- 1865: Stephen Smith, a public health advocate, directs fellow faculty members of New York University Medical College to conduct the most comprehensive health survey of an American city ever undertaken, leading to the establishment of New York City's Metropolitan Board of Health, the first such public health agency in the U.S.
- 1904: U.S. Army Colonel William C. Gorgas, an 1879 alumnus of Bellevue Hospital Medical College, is appointed chief sanitary officer for the Panama Canal project, for which he implements measures that eradicate yellow fever and contain malaria, permitting construction to be completed
- 1907: Sara Josephine Baker, a faculty member of university and Bellevue Hospital Medical College, leads efforts as New York City's assistant commissioner of health to track down and quarantine "Typhoid Mary" Mallon, a domestic cook who, as an asymptomatic carrier of the disease, is the source of a deadly outbreak
- 1923: University and Bellevue Hospital Medical College graduates its first female medical students: Grace S. Goldberg, Ella M. Hediger, Helen Druhan O'Brien, Marion Robertson, Edith C. Rosenthal, and Anna Topper
- 1926: May Edward Chinn is the first Black woman to receive a medical degree from University and Bellevue Hospital Medical College
- 1932: Department of Forensic Medicine, the first academic department of its kind in the U.S., is established at University and Bellevue Hospital Medical College. with Charles Norris, New York City's Chief Medical Examiner, as its chair
- 1945: "The Mission of a Medical School," a long-range plan for medical education, scientific research, and patient care at New York University College of Medicine, is authored by faculty members Donal Sheehan, professor of anatomy and later dean, and Howard C. Taylor Jr., professor of obstetrics and gynecology
- 1947: A site for a new medical center, consisting of the NYU School of Medicine, the Post-Graduate Medical School, university (now Tisch) Hospital, and the Rusk Institute of Rehabilitation Medicine, is selected. The Institute of Industrial Medicine is established
- 1948: Department of Physical Medicine and Rehabilitation, the first comprehensive medical training program of its kind, is established at New York University College of Medicine. Its chair, Howard A. Rusk, draws on his experience treating wounded soldiers during World War II to develop a philosophy of caring for the patient as a whole person
- 1951: Department of Neurosurgery is established at New York University College of Medicine
- 1951: Homer W. Smith., professor of physiology at New York University College of Medicine, authors The Kidney: Structure and Function in Health and Disease, a definitive work on renal physiology
- 1954: Jonas Salk, a 1939 alumnus of New York University College of Medicine, tests the first polio vaccine on more than one million school children, the largest public health experiment in U.S. history
- 1955: James A. Shannon, a 1929 alumnus and faculty member of New York University College of Medicine, is appointed director of the National Institutes of Health
- 1957: Albert Sabin, a 1931 alumnus of university and Bellevue Hospital Medical College, introduces the first live-virus vaccine against polio, an oral vaccine that effectively eliminates polio in the U.S. and dramatically reduces its impact worldwide
- 1958: Aubré de Lambert Maynard, a 1926 alumnus of university and Bellevue Hospital Medical College who serves as chief of surgery at Harlem Hospital Medical Center, is credited with saving the life of Dr. Martin Luther King Jr., after he was stabbed in the chest by a woman who was later diagnosed with paranoid schizophrenia
- 1960: Nina S. Braunwald, a 1952 alumna of New York University School of Medicine who is the first female cardiac surgeon in the U.S., performs the world's first successful mitral valve replacement, using an artificial device of her own design and fabrication
- 1966: Frank C. Spencer is appointed the George David Stewart Professor of Surgery and chair of the Department of Surgery at New York University School of Medicine, where he develops techniques, such as coronary artery bypass grafting, that help lay the foundation for modern-day cardiac surgery
- 1975: One of the first designated national cancer centers is established at NYU, later named the Rita and Stanley H. Kaplan Center.
- 1982: Linda Laubenstein, a 1973 alumna and clinical professor of medicine at New York University School of Medicine, and Alvin E. Friedman-Kien, professor of dermatology and microbiology, coauthor the first paper published in a medical journal (The Lancet) linking HIV/AIDS to cases of Kaposi's sarcoma, a previously rare skin cancer that would become an AIDS-defining illness.
- 1989: Jan Vilček., professor of microbiology, and Junming Le, adjunct associate professor of microbiology, at New York University School of Medicine, develop the monoclonal antibody that is the basis for Remicade, a potent biologic drug used to treat rheumatoid arthritis and other inflammatory disease
- 1989: Plastic surgeons at New York University School of Medicine perform the first craniofacial distraction, a procedure that strategically cuts and rebuilds facial bones to restore their anatomy
- 1989: Frank H. Netter, a 1931 alumnus of university and Bellevue Hospital Medical College, publishes the Atlas of Human Anatomy
- 1992: NYU Medical Center opens Women's Health Services under the auspices of the Departments of Obstetrics and Gynecology and Radiology.
- 1993: The School of Medicine's Skirball Institute of Biomolecular Medicine is opened as an uncompromising commitment to the advancement and understanding of molecular approaches for the treatment of various important diseases.
- 1995: The Sir Harold Acton Society is established to recognize donors of $1 million or more.
- 2001: Charles Hirsch, chair of the Department of Forensic Medicine at New York University School of Medicine and Chief Medical Examiner of the City of New York, establishes a temporary morgue at the World Trade Center on September 11, 2001, then coordinates the largest number of post-mortem examinations in history, cataloguing some 22,000 individual human remains and identifying about 60% of the 2,753 victims
- 2004: The NYU Clinical Cancer Center is opened (now called NYU Langone Health Perlmutter Cancer Center), an NCI-Designated comprehensive cancer center.
- 2004: The Nobel Prize for Chemistry is awarded to the distinguished NYU adjunct faculty member Avram Hershko for his seminal discovery of the ubiquitin system in protein degradation.
- 2006: Hospital for Joint Diseases merges with NYU Medical Center and is renamed the NYU Hospital for Joint Diseases.
- 2006: The School of Medicine's Joan and Joel Smilow Research Center is opened to house 4 major programmatic areas: Cancer, Pathology, Dermatology/Cutaneous Biology, and Cardiovascular Biology.
- 2014: Physicians from New York University School of Medicine care for New York City's first and only Ebola patient at Bellevue Hospital. Craig Spencer, a 33-year-old emergency medicine physician at New York-Presbyterian/Columbia University Medical Center, receives a range of experimental treatments and, after being declared free of the virus, is discharged on November 11 after 19 days
- 2015: A team of surgeons from New York University School of Medicine performs the most extensive face transplant in history
- 2019: Judith S. Hochman, the Harold Snyder Family Professor of Cardiology and NYU Grossman School of Medicine, presents the results of an international finding that for patients with stable ischemic coronary disease, an invasive treatment strategy (stenting) significantly outperformed a conservative approach in controlling chest pain (angina), but it offered no advantage in preventing cardiovascular-related death, heart attack, hospitalization for unstable angina or health failure, or resuscitation after cardiac arrest
- 2020: A team of surgeons from NYU Grossman School of Medicine, led by Eduardo D. Rodriguez, the Helen L. Kimmel Professor of Reconstructive Plastic Surgery and chair of the Hansjörg Wyss Department of Plastic Surgery, performs the world's first successful face and double hand transplant. The patient, 22-year-old Joseph DiMeo, had suffered severe burns in a car accident
- 2022: Department of Radiology at NYU Grossman School of Medicine introduces video radiology reports to help patients understand the key clinical findings of their imaging exams, the first such reports made widely available to patients in a U.S. health system
- 2023: A team led by Eduardo D. Rodriguez, MD, DDS, performed the first human whole-eye transplant combined with a partial-face transplant
- 2024: A team led by Robert Montgomery, MD, DPhil, with cardiac surgery leadership from Nader Moazami, MD, performed the first combined mechanical heart pump implantation and gene-edited pig kidney transplant in a patient with heart and kidney failure
- 2024: Stephanie H. Chang, MD, led the first fully robotic lung transplant in the United States, using the da Vinci Xi robotic system during each stage of the procedure. She also performed the world's first fully robotic double-lung transplant.
- 2025: Began the first clinical trial of gene-edited pig kidney transplants in humans, led by Robert Montgomery, MD, DPhil

== Research ==
With $962 billion in active awards from the National Institutes of Health (NIH), NYU Grossman School of Medicine is among the nation's top-funded health systems for research. Its faculty are involved in a range of multidisciplinary studies aimed at understanding the mechanisms behind health and disease. In 2021, NYU Grossman School of Medicine was selected by the National Institute of Health (NIH) to be the Clinical Science Core of the Researching COVID to Enhance Recovery (RECOVER) Initiative, a project aimed at understanding the long-term effects of COVID-19 to help develop new approaches to diagnosis and treatment. The School's award of more than $450 million is one of the largest grants in NIH history

== Notable people ==
- Robert I. Grossman, Dean & chief executive officer (2007–2025)
- Alec C. Kimmelman, Dean & chief executive officer (2025–)
