= New York University Grossman Long Island School of Medicine =

Public university in Long Island, New York, U.S.

Coordinates: 40.7417°N 73.6408°W

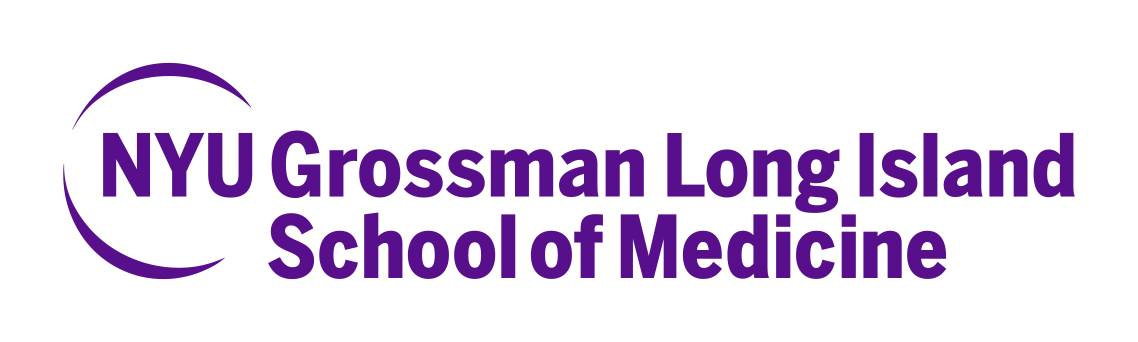
- Former name: New York University Long Island School of Medicine (2019–2023)
- Type: Private medical school
- Established: July 2019; 7 years ago
- Dean: Alec C. Kimmelman
- Location: Mineola, Long Island, New York
- Website: medli.nyu.edu

The New York University Grossman Long Island School of Medicine (formerly NYU Long Island School of Medicine) is one of the two medical schools of New York University, the other being NYU Grossman School of Medicine. Both are part of NYU Langone Health. Founded in 2019, the school is located in Mineola village on Long Island, New York, United States.

== History ==
The NYU Grossman Long Island School of Medicine (abbreviated as NYU GLISOM) was founded in July 2019, with an inaugural class of 24 students. Located on the campus of NYU Langone Hospital—Long Island in Mineola, New York, the institution is the fourth medical school on Long Island.

The school offers matriculated students a directed pathway to residency at the NYU Langone Hospital—Long Island through the National Resident Matching Program. As of 2023, 85 percent of the school’s graduates remained in New York for their training.

In January 2023, Gladys M. Ayala, was appointed dean of the NYU Long Island School of Medicine, having previously served as vice dean and professor of medicine.

In February 2023, the NYU Long Island School of Medicine was granted full accreditation by the Liaison Committee on Medical Education, the accrediting body for educational programs at schools of medicine in the United States and Canada.

On July 21, 2023, Long Island native Kenneth G. Langone, board chair of NYU Langone Health, and his wife, Elaine, announced their $200 million donation to the school to extend full-tuition scholarships to every student in good standing, regardless of need or merit. At the request of the Langones, the school was renamed the New York University Grossman Long Island School of Medicine in honor of Robert I. Grossman, then the CEO of NYU Langone Health and dean of NYU Grossman School of Medicine.

NYU Grossman Long Island School of Medicine is one of the few medical schools in the U.S. that offer a three-year MD degree focused on primary care. All incoming students receive full-tuition scholarships regardless of need or merit.

In 2024, the school received 4,332 applications for the 24 spots in its entering class.

== Academics ==
The NYU Long Island School of Medicine has 17 academic departments in the clinical and basic sciences. The school’s curriculum is founded on the principles of translational science, population health, clinical science, and application of health systems science. The curriculum is delivered in three phases: a preclinical year providing foundational medical knowledge and core clinical skills; core clinical clerkship rotations; and advanced clinical rotations.

Investigators at the NYU Long Island School of Medicine engage in research in basic science, clinical studies, and population health and health services research. The school’s researchers study a wide spectrum of illnesses, including cancer, cardiovascular disease, and COVID-19. A focus of current research is the causes and consequences of obesity and diabetes, including the mechanisms responsible for the development of cardiovascular and central nervous system complications.

== See also ==
- New York University Grossman School of Medicine
- New York University
- NYU Langone Health
- NYU Langone Hospital—Long Island
