= Robert Grossman =

Robert Grossman may refer to:

- Robert Grossman (artist) (1940-2018), American painter, sculptor, filmmaker, comics artist, illustrator and author
- Robert I. Grossman (fl. 1975-present), American physician and researcher
- Robert L. Grossman (fl. 1984-present), American computer scientist and bioinformatician
- Robbie Grossman (born 1989), American baseball player
