= Ben Fortunado Marcune =

American sculptor and painter (born 1935)

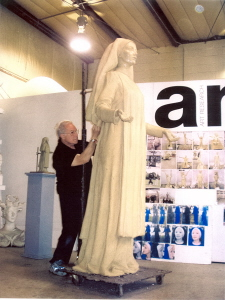
- Ben F. Marcune in 2001
- Born: Ben Fortunado Marcune; March 30, 1935 (age 91); Sheepshead Bay, New York
- Education: UCLA, San Francisco Arts Institute, Pennsylvania Academy of Fine Arts
- Known for: Painting & Sculpture
- Movement: Figurative

Ben Fortunado Marcune is an American sculptor and painter.

== Early life and career ==
Marcune was born in New York City on March 30, 1935. Initially raised in Brooklyn he moved with his family to Florida and later to California. Marcune attended UCLA and Caltech in the 1950s and earned a master's degree in human factors engineering. After serving as a medic in the United States Army in Korea, Marcune worked as a biomedical and industrial designer. He obtained patents for several surgical and orthopedic devices. He also performed as a lead dancer for the Philadelphia Civic Ballet.

Marcune attended the Pennsylvania Academy of Fine Arts in the 1970s and graduated in 1976. Marcune began to shift his focus from engineering and design to the fine arts and by the late 1980s was painting full time. In the 1990s through the present, Marcune began to work on public bronze sculptures. He currently maintains three working studios in Northampton and Bucks County, Pennsylvania.

Marcune's bronze sculptures are located primarily in Pennsylvania, including the Korean-Vietnam Memorial at Lehigh Carbon Community College, the Worker’s Memorial in the Bethlehem Rose Garden, and Jesus as Teacher on the campus of DeSales University. He has had portraits commissioned by Quakertown National Bank, St. Luke’s Hospital, Moravian College, DeSales University, and Lafayette College. His oil landscapes are in public and private collections, including Lehigh Valley Hospital, St. Luke’s Hospital, DeSales University and UGI.

== Examples of Work ==
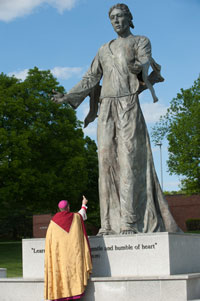
Jesus as Teacher with Bishop Barres blessing the statue.

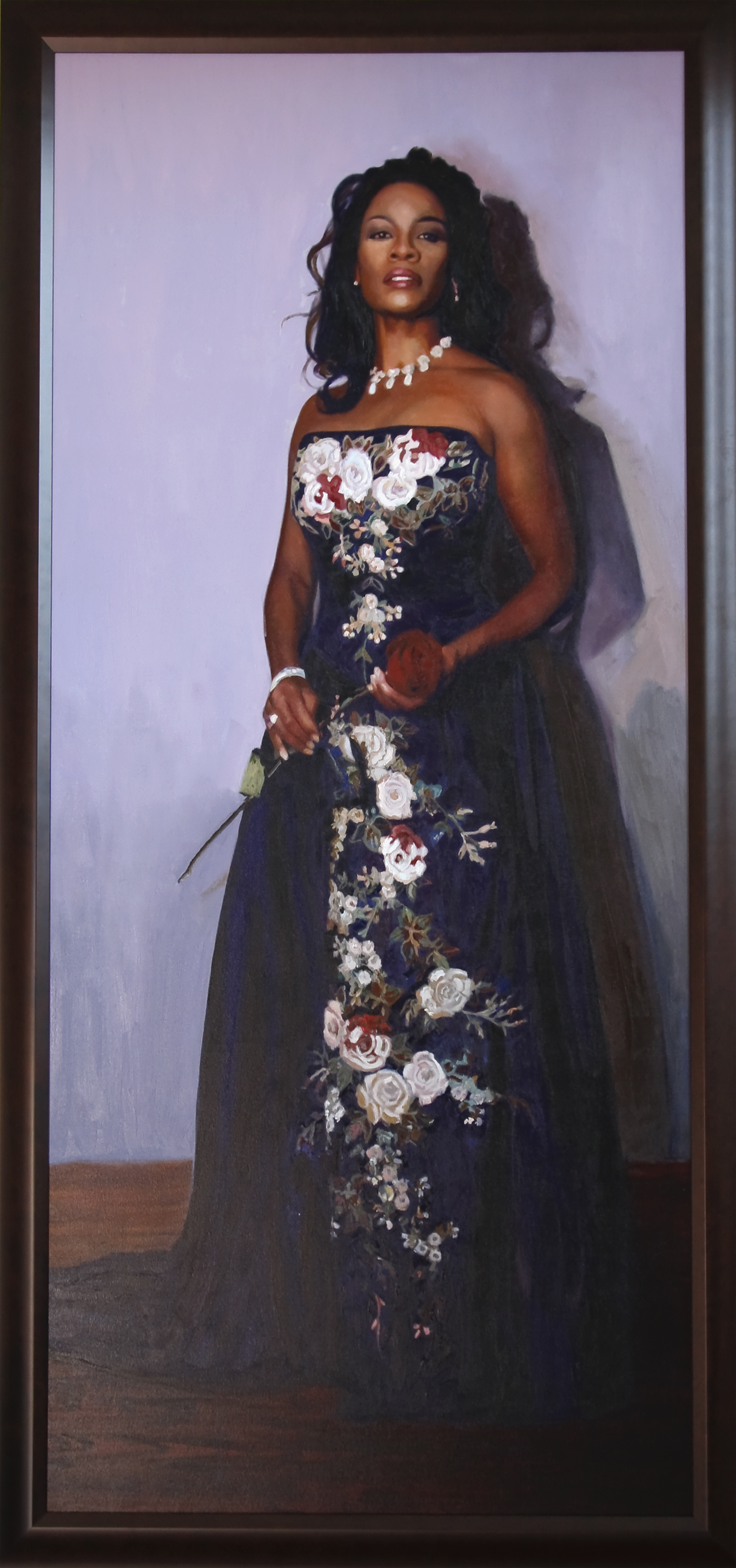
Marcune's painting of Denyce Graves an American operatic mezzo-soprano.

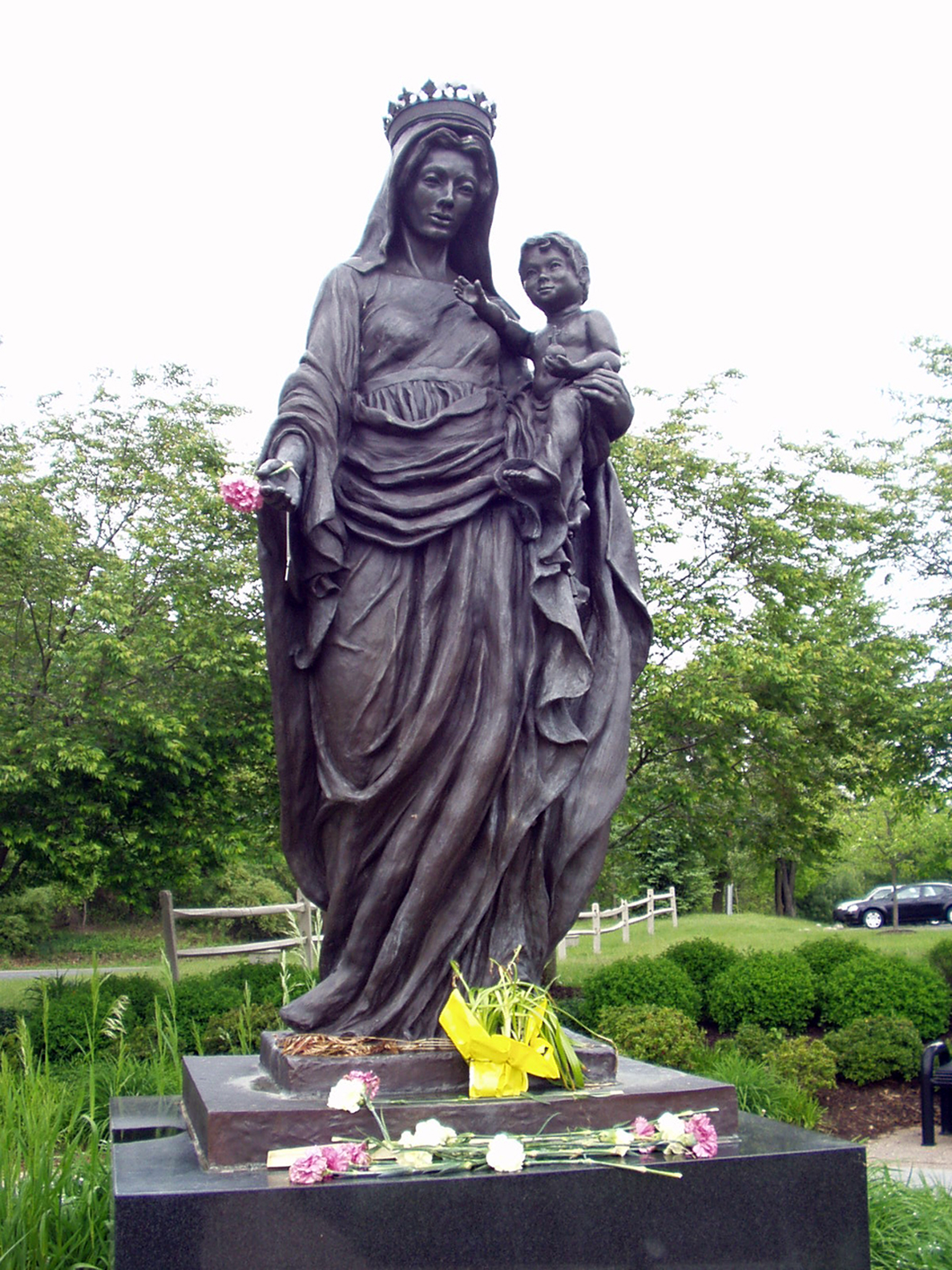
Bronze Gustavo torres sculpture created by Ben Fortunado Marcune
