= Alec C. Kimmelman =

American academic

Alec C. Kimmelman is an American physician and researcher who is dean of NYU Grossman School of Medicine and chief executive officer of NYU Langone Health.

== Early life and education ==
Kimmelman earned his bachelor's degree from Cornell University and completed a dual MD/PhD through the Medical Scientist Training Program at the Icahn School of Medicine at Mount Sinai. He joined Harvard Medical School as a clinical fellow, completing his residency in radiation oncology and a postdoctoral fellowship at Dana-Farber.

== Career ==
Kimmelman ran a research program at Dana-Farber Cancer Institute focused on pancreatic cancer. He was also an attending physician at Brigham and Women's Hospital and Dana-Farber Cancer Institute, where he specialized in gastrointestinal malignancies, including pancreatic cancer.

Kimmelman joined NYU Langone in 2016 and has held several leadership roles at the medical center. He served as director of NYU Langone's Laura and Isaac Perlmutter Cancer Center, the Laura and Isaac Perlmutter Professor of Radiation Oncology, the Anita Steckler and Joseph Steckler Chair of the Department of Radiation Oncology, and chair of the Department of Radiation Oncology at NYU Grossman School of Medicine. He was also associate dean of cancer research at the school, served on the Executive Management Committee of the Perlmutter Cancer Center, and co-led its Cancer Cell Biology Program.

In 2025, Kimmelman was appointed dean of NYU Grossman School of Medicine and chief executive officer of NYU Langone Health.

== Research ==
Kimmelman is a National Institutes of Health–funded investigator whose work has primarily focused on pancreatic cancer and the key biological functions of Ras oncogenes. Kimmelman's laboratory was focused on the basic and translational science of pancreatic cancer. His research identified unique metabolic pathways and revealed how the Kras oncogene reprograms tumor metabolism. This work has helped define the metabolic characteristics of pancreatic cancer and has supported the development of multiple clinical trials targeting the disease.

Kimmelman's research has been published in Cell, Science, Nature, Cancer Cell, Cancer Discovery and Genes & Development.

=== Milestones ===
In 2023, Kimmelman received a $1.7 million Drug Discovery Award from the Mark Foundation for Cancer Research. Under his leadership, the Perlmutter Cancer Center established the Center for Molecular Oncology in October 2024.

During Kimmelman’s tenure as director of the Laura and Isaac Perlmutter Cancer Center, he and his team oversaw research initiatives, clinical programs and trials, and the expansion of disease centers and cancer services across NYU Langone sites.

== Awards and honors ==
In 2015, Kimmelman was awarded the Ruth Leff Siegel Award for Excellence in Pancreatic Cancer Research by Columbia University. He has been inducted into both the American Society for Clinical Investigation and the Association of American Physicians. In 2021, he was named one of the world's most influential researchers by Clarivate, an acknowledgment reserved for scientists whose publications rank in the top 1 percent of citations in their field.
