= NYU Langone Hospital – Long Island =

Hospital in Mineola, New York, U.S.

Coordinates: 40.740114°N 73.642735°W

- NYU Langone Health
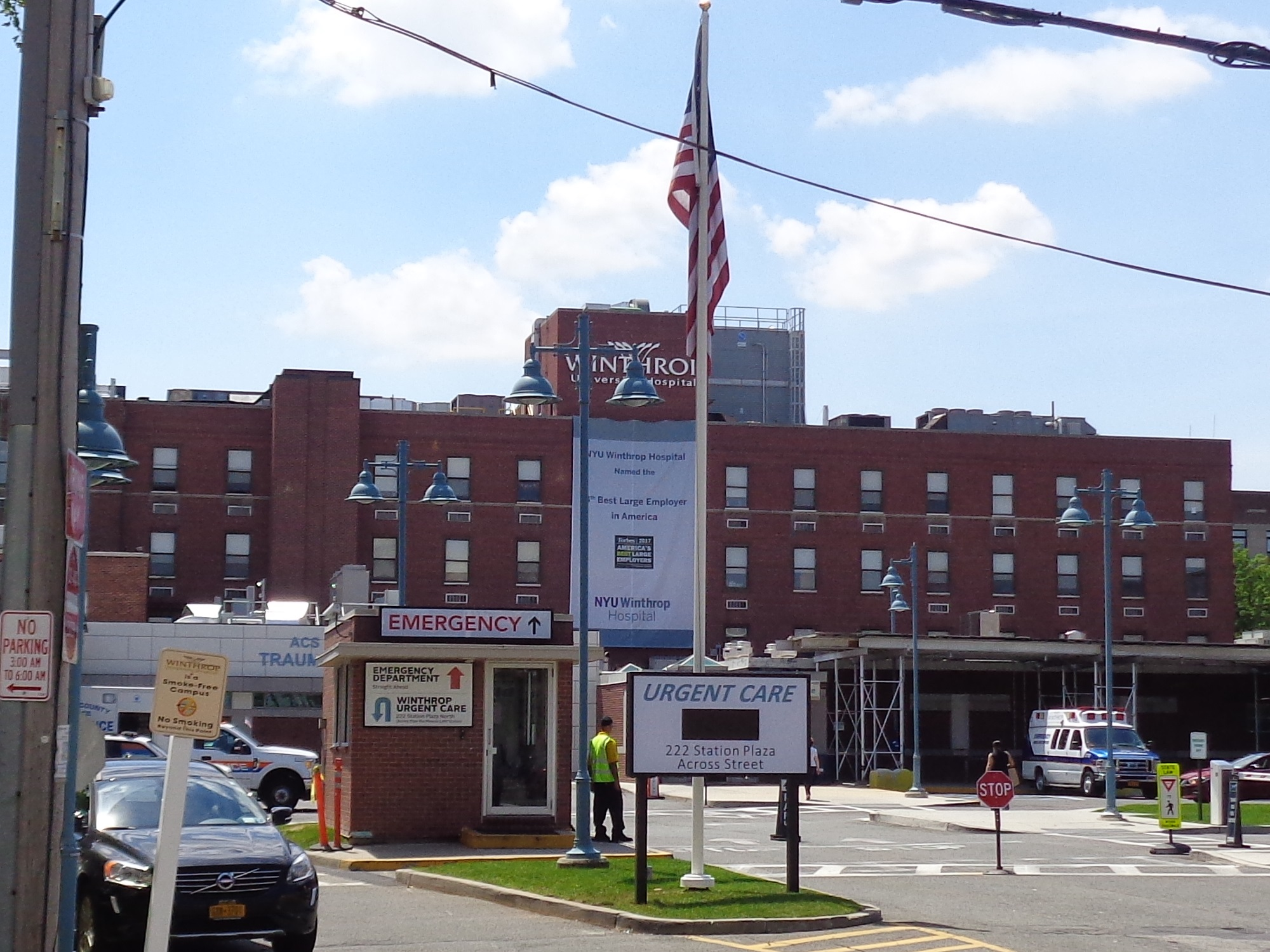
- The main hospital building in 2017

Geography
- Location: 259 First Street, Mineola, New York, U.S.

Organisation
- Care system: Private
- Type: Teaching
- Affiliated university: NYU Grossman Long Island School of Medicine
- Network: NYU Langone Health System

Services
- Emergency department: Level I Trauma Center
- Beds: 591

Helipads
- Helipad: FAA LID: NK37
Number	Length		Surface
Number	ft	m	Surface
H1	80 x 80	24 x 24	concrete

History
- Founded: 1896

Links
- Lists: Hospitals in U.S.

NYU Langone Hospital – Long Island is a hospital in Mineola, New York, United States on Long Island, affiliated with NYU Langone Health. It founded in 1896 as Long Island's first hospital as Nassau Hospital, and was renamed in 1985 to Winthrop-University Hospital.

== History ==
=== Early history ===
Nassau Hospital was founded in 1896 as Long Island's first hospital. Its initial location was in West Hempstead in a former mansion on Hempstead Turnpike and Hilbert Street that had been the summer home of Abner K. Bedell, an import merchant of silver and china.

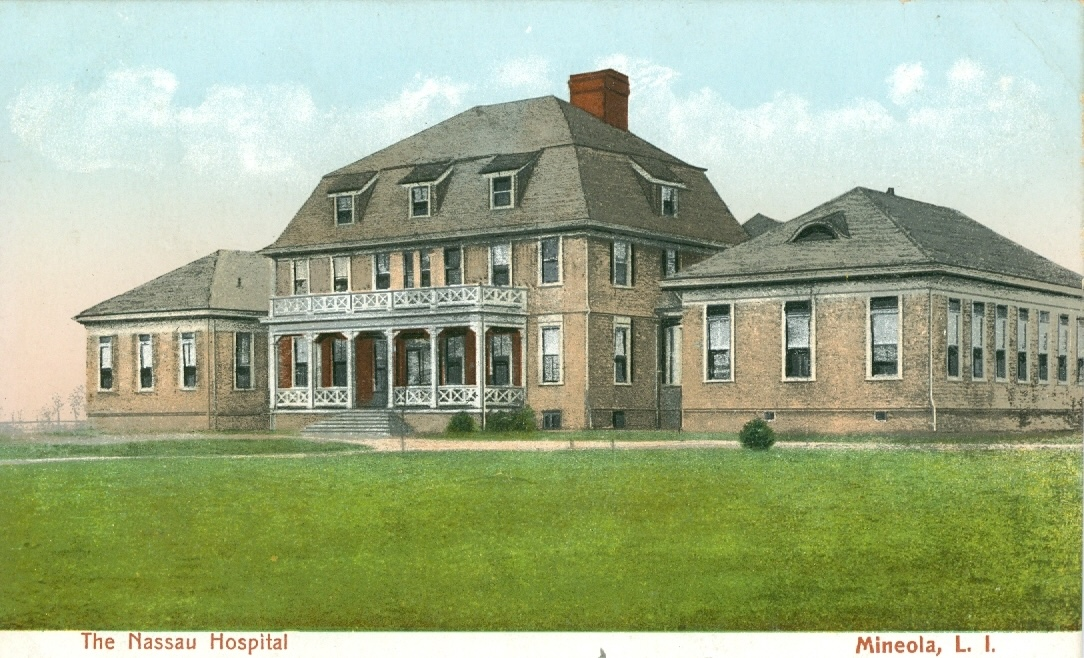
The first hospital building in Mineola around 1907

The hospital moved to Mineola in 1900. The architect was Richard Howland Hunt. The original building consisted of a central administration building, men's and women's wards to its sides, and an operating pavilion at its rear.

The hospital had the support of wealthy New Yorkers including J. P. Morgan. Two additions to the original building were constructed in 1908. The Cooley Building, the first maternal care structure on Long Island, was constructed in 1924. Another building was constructed in 1926, a professional residence in 1927, and a new laundry and power plant in 1938.

=== Construction of current buildings ===
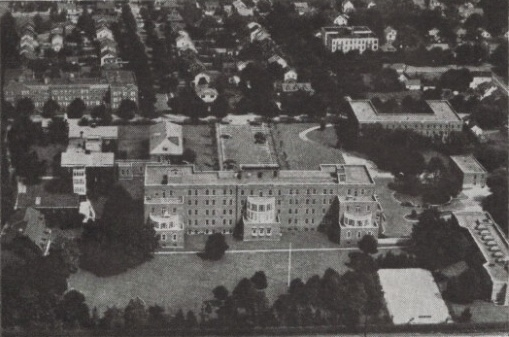
Nassau Hospital from the south in 1945, a few years after the current main building opened

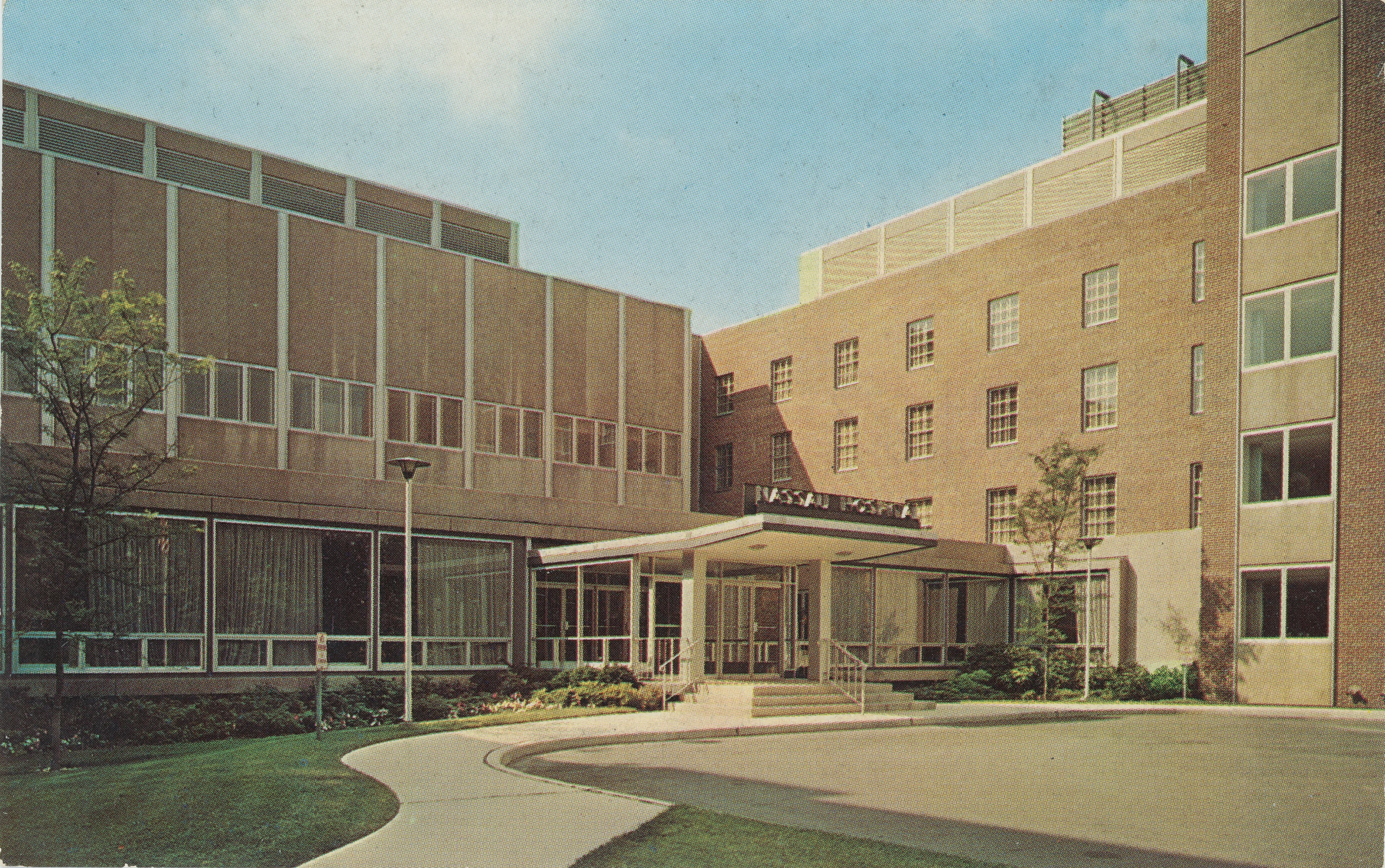
The hospital's north-facing main entrance in the late 1960s, with the new Potter Pavilion at right

The hospital main lobby in 1968

A new four-story main building was constructed in 1940 that increased the hospital's capacity to 227 beds. The original building was demolished after the opening of this new main building, although the 1927 building was retained. The new building faced north, as opposed to the old building which faced south.

In 1954, a new Women's Pavilion increased its capacity by another 100 beds; its construction was funded through the federal Hill–Burton Act. (It was renamed as the Gardner Pavilion in 1977.)

In 1965, the four-story Potter Pavilion was built, followed by a new emergency department in 1967, and the purchase of the nearby Nassau Towers apartment building in 1968 for use as a doctors' residence. A new parking structure was completed in 1973. The six-story Hoag Pavilion was added in 1975. The North Pavilion opened in 1980, which required demolition of the 1924 Cooley Pavilion.

=== Later history ===
The name was changed to Winthrop-University Hospital in 1985 due to confusion with Nassau County Medical Center. The name was chosen to honor the Winthrop family, including Robert Winthrop, an investment banker and former president of the hospital who was a descendant of John Winthrop, and his uncle and wife. In 1996, it joined with South Nassau Communities Hospital to form the Winthrop South Nassau University Health System.

In 1998, the New Life Center wing opened. Around this time, the Emergency Department and Ambulatory Surgical Suite were expanded and modernized. In 2004, two newly constructed floors opened on top of the North Wing, containing cardiac and children's facilities, increasing its height from three to five floors.

In 2003, the Winthrop South Nassau System became part of New York Presbyterian.

In 2017, Winthrop became affiliated with NYU Langone, becoming NYU Winthrop. (In 2018, South Nassau hospital instead joined the Mount Sinai Health System.) By 2019, a full asset merger between NYU and Winthrop had been complete. In November 2020, it was announced that the hospital changed its name to NYU Langone Hospital - Long Island.

In December 2024, a new annex to the emergency department opened.

== Activities ==
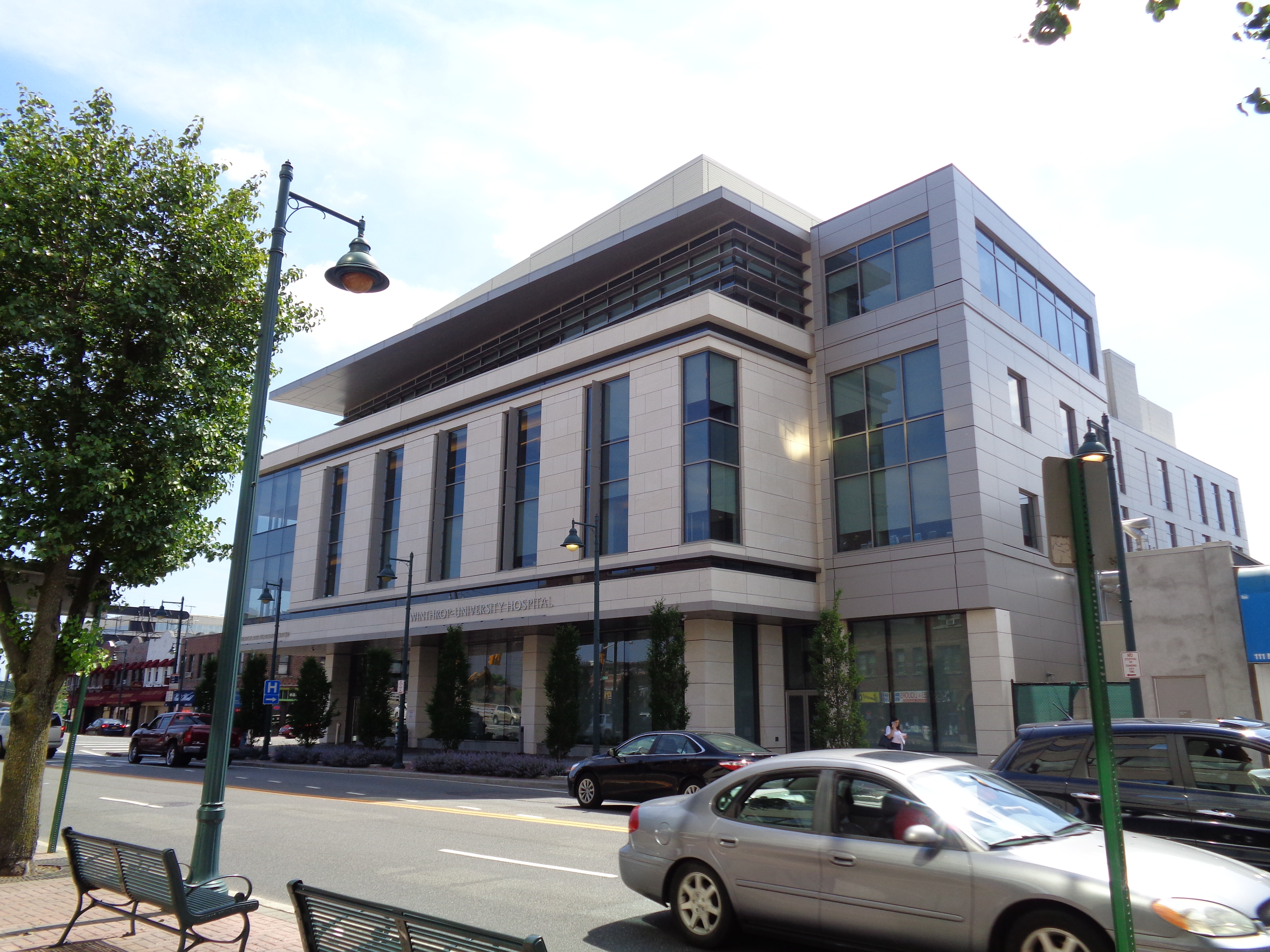
NYU Grossman Long Island School of Medicine Research and Academic Center in 2017

It is ranked by U.S. News & World Report and is tied for #1 hospital in the New York metropolitan area. It is currently a 591-bed academic medical center which is an ACS verified Level 1 Trauma Center and certified Comprehensive stroke center. The hospital features more than 75 divisions of specialty care.

It is designated as an ACS Verified Level I Trauma Center, comprehensive stroke center, and Regional Perinatal Center.

NYU Langone Hospital – Long Island also has a Research Institute and is home to the new NYU Grossman Long Island School of Medicine, a tuition-free school with an accelerated three-year curriculum devoted exclusively to training primary care physicians.

== Notable patients ==
=== Deaths ===
- James Barton (1890–1962)
- Duane Jones (1937–1988)
- Jack Spector (1928–1994)
- Cornelius W. Wickersham (1885–1968)
