= Denyce Graves =

American mezzo-soprano (born 1964)

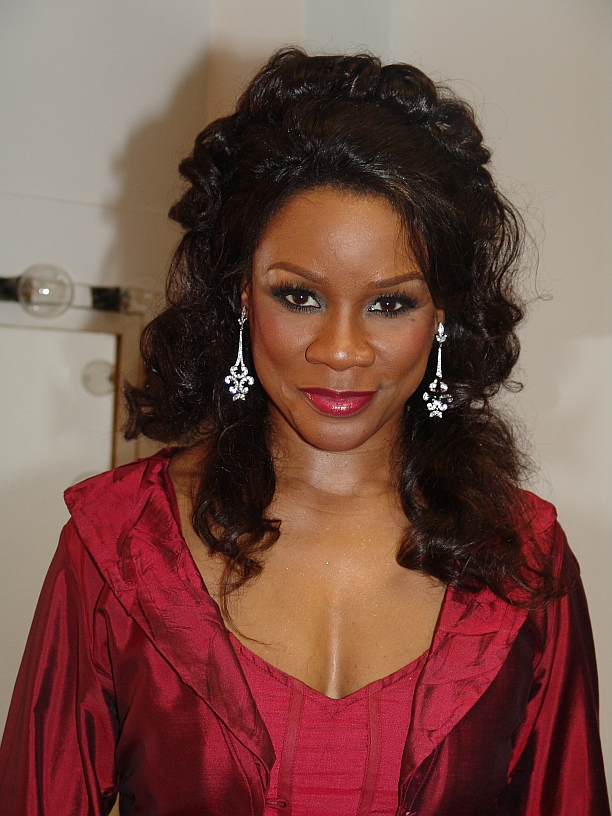
- Denyce Graves in Baltimore, Maryland, 2013
- Born: March 7, 1964 (age 62); Washington, D.C. United States
- Occupation: Opera singer (mezzo-soprano)
- Years active: 1995–2026
- Spouse: David Perry (guitarist/lutenist) 1990-2001 Robert Montgomery
- Parents: Charles Graves (father); Dorothy Graves-Kenner (mother)

Denyce Graves (born March 7, 1964) is an American mezzo-soprano opera singer.

== Early life ==
Graves was born on March 7, 1964, in Washington, D.C., to Charles Graves and Dorothy (Middleton) Graves-Kenner. She is the middle of three children and was raised by her mother on Galveston Street, S.W., in the Bellevue section of Washington. Despite Graves' shyness, her mother encouraged her to sing in church as a child. She took music lessons with Judith Allen, who took her to watch rehearsals of D.C.'s All City Chorus at Constitution Hall. At age 13, Graves heard a record of Puccini arias sung by Leontyne Price, and decided she wanted to become an opera singer.

Allen encouraged Graves to audition for Duke Ellington School of the Arts, which she was accepted into. She graduated in 1981. Graves studied voice at the Oberlin Conservatory of Music and the New England Conservatory with Helen Hodam. At Oberlin, Graves experienced racist comments from people who believed opera was for white people, including a professor who told her "This is not a place for you."

== Career ==
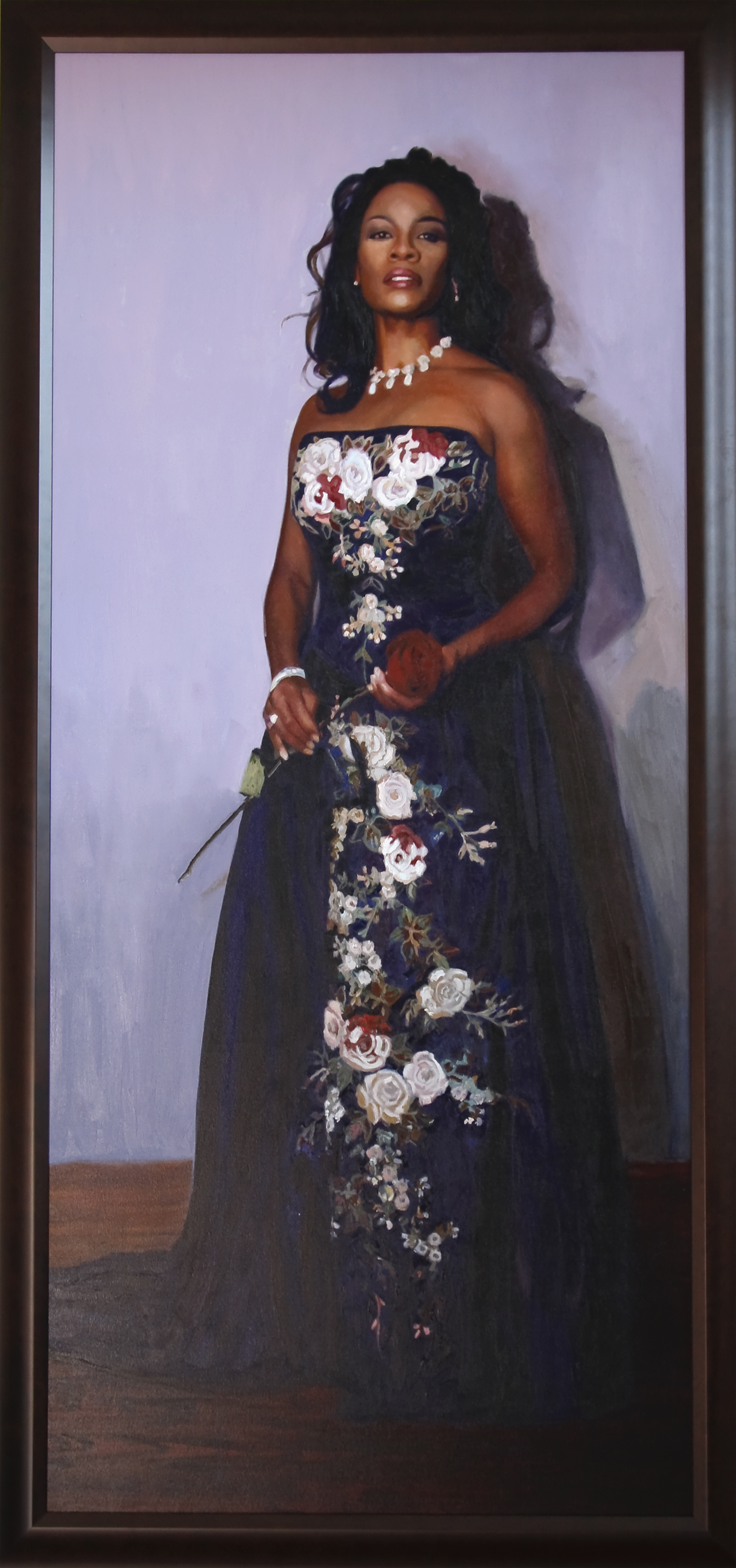
Portrait painted by Ben Fortunado Marcune

=== Performing ===
In 1985, she signed a contract with the Tulsa Opera and performed in Porgy and Bess and The Magic Flute.

She worked at the Wolf Trap Opera Company, which provides further training and experience for young singers who are between their academic training and full-time professional careers. Soon after, she was invited by David Gockley to participate in the Houston Opera Studio, from 1988 to 1990, where she studied with Elena Nikolaidi.

She made her Metropolitan Opera debut in 1995 as Carmen from Carmen. Before the performance, she was interviewed by Morley Safer for an episode of 60 Minutes.

Graves has appeared at many opera houses. Though her repertoire is extensive, her signature parts are the title roles in Carmen and Samson et Dalila. Graves also made many appearances on the children's television series Between the Lions and Sesame Street. In one Sesame Street episode, she sang Elmo a lullaby based on "Habanera."

Graves sang "America the Beautiful" and "The Lord's Prayer" at the Washington National Cathedral during a memorial service for the victims of 9/11 on September 14, 2001, attended by President Bush, members of Congress, other politicians and representatives of foreign governments.

In 2003, Graves performed in front of a live audience at the Mann Center for the Performing Arts in Philadelphia for a television special, Denyce Graves: Breaking the Rules. In 2005, she hosted the radio show Voce di Donna (Voice of a Lady) on Vox!, the vocal classical music channel of XM Satellite Radio, on which she interviewed various opera singers. Graves often was heard on The Tony Kornheiser Show radio program with her rendition of the "Mailbag Theme".

On January 20, 2005, she sang the patriotic song "American Anthem" during the 55th Presidential Inauguration, between the swearing-in ceremonies of Vice President Dick Cheney and President George W. Bush for their second terms in office.

In 2005, she sang the lead role in the world premiere of Margaret Garner, an opera by Richard Danielpour and Toni Morrison.

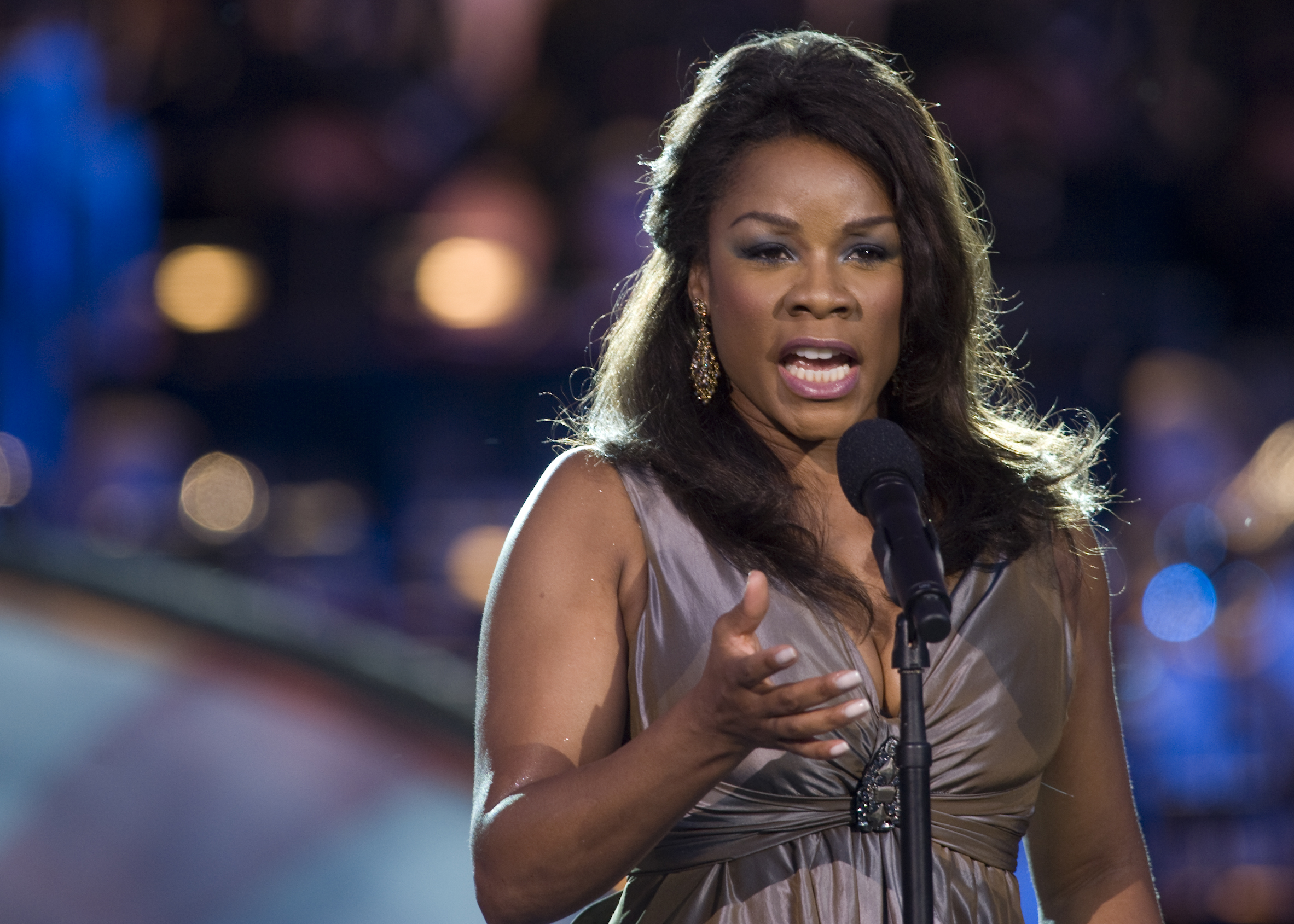
Graves performing at the PBS National Memorial Day Concert in Washington, D.C., 2009

In May 2010, Graves performed a concert with tenor Lawrence Brownlee in the United States Supreme Court Building for the Supreme Court justices.

On June 15, 2013, Graves sang in the world premiere of Terence Blanchard's and Michael Cristofer's boxing opera, Champion with the Opera Theatre of Saint Louis.

In 2014, a recording of We Shall Overcome arranged by composer Nolan Williams, Jr. and featuring Graves was among several works of art, including the poem A Brave and Startling Truth by Maya Angelou, sent to space on the first test flight of the spacecraft Orion.

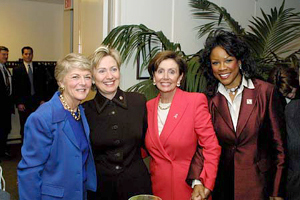
Graves marked Women's History Month in 2003, with Senator Hillary Clinton, House Minority Leader Nancy Pelosi, and former vice presidential candidate Geraldine Ferraro.

On September 25, 2020, Graves sang at the US Capitol as her friend Ruth Bader Ginsburg's casket was lying in state. Ginsburg was a devoted fan of opera.

In 2021, she performed at the Tulsa Opera in Greenwood Overcomes, which memorialized the Tulsa Race Massacre.

On November 22, 2022, she sang the role of Sally in the stage premiere of Kevin Puts's opera The Hours at the Metropolitan Opera. The performance of December 10 was video-cast as part of the Metropolitan Opera Live in HD series.

In 2025, Graves announced plans to retire from the stage. Her final appearance was on January 24, 2026, in the Metropolitan Opera's performance of Porgy and Bess. She played Maria, a supporting character. The company's general manager, Peter Gelb, presented her with a commemorative plaque, which was then installed in the Met's List Hall.

=== Directing ===
She made her directorial debut in May 2022: Carmen at the Minnesota Opera.

In 2025, she directed another opera: the premiere of Loving v. Virginia, composed by Damine Geter with a libretto written by Jessica Murphy Moo. The opera tells the story of the court case of the same name.

In March of 2026, she directed Treemonisha, the opening production of Washington National Opera's 70th spring season. The opera's original orchestration was lost, and Graves worked with composer Damien Sneed and librettist Kyle Bass to create a restoration. It was originally scheduled to debut at the Kennedy Center Opera House, but the Washington National Opera ended its residence at the building due to a disagreement with Donald Trump. Loving v. Virginia debuted at the Lisner Auditorium instead.

== Recognition ==
In 2017, Graves was honored by The Washington Performing Arts with the Ambassador of the Arts Award.

In 2019, Graves received the Golden Plate Award of the American Academy of Achievement presented by Awards Council member Dr. Ben Carson.
