= Robert Montgomery (physician) =

American transplant surgeon (born 1960)

- Born: 1960 (age 65–66); Buffalo, New York, US
- Spouse: Denyce Graves
- Children: 4
- Awards: Thomas J. Watson Fellowship
- Scientific career
- Fields: Transplant Surgery
- Workplaces: New York University; Johns Hopkins University

Robert Montgomery is an American transplant surgeon. He is currently director of the Transplant Institute at NYU Langone Health. In 2026, he was elected to the American Philosophical Society.

== Early life and education ==
Montgomery was born in January 1960, in Buffalo, New York, and spent his early years on Potter Avenue in Orchard Park, New York, growing up with his three older brothers and all the kids on the street. The fourth of four male siblings, he decided to pursue a career in medicine after the long illness and death of his father from familial cardiomyopathy at age 52. He received his undergraduate degree from St. Lawrence University in 1982 and his medical degree from the University of Rochester School of Medicine in 1987. As a Fulbright Scholar, he completed a doctorate in molecular immunology from Balliol College in Oxford, England.

== Career ==
Montgomery received his general surgical training at Johns Hopkins Hospital from 1987 to 1995. He was a co-resident with Peter Attia. During his residency, he took time out to complete his D.Phil in Transplantation Biology at the University of Oxford, graduating in 1993. He did a post-doctoral fellowship at Johns Hopkins in Human Genetics. He then finished his clinical training in Multi-Organ Transplantation at Johns Hopkins from 1997-1999 after which he joined the clinical staff as an Assistant Professor of Surgery. In 2003 Montgomery became Chief of the Division of Transplantation and Director of the Comprehensive Transplant Center at Johns Hopkins, positions he held until 2016. In the first year at those positions Montgomery was lead physician in what Johns Hopkins called the world's first simultaneous "triple swap" kidney transplant operation. Other such surgeries with Montgomery as lead physician occurred at Johns Hopkins during the decade. In 2003, Montgomery was the inaugural recipient of the Margery K. and Thomas Pozefsky Professorship in Kidney Transplantation. In 2016, he accepted a position as the inaugural Director of the NYU Langone Transplant Institute in New York.

== Innovations in transplant surgery ==
Montgomery was among a team of surgeons at Johns Hopkins who develop a laparoscopic method for removing a kidney from a living donor that is now common practice.

He developed the idea of domino kidney paired donation to find matches for a series of living donors whose kidneys were not compatible with their desired recipient.

On September 25, 2021, Montgomery performed the first genetically engineered pig kidney xenotransplantation to a human. The kidney was engineered by Revivicor, Inc., a subsidiary of United Therapeutics, to remove the alpha-gal sugar, which is associated with hyperacute rejection. It was transplanted to a deceased human body donor, which did not reject the kidney while ventilated for 54 hours.

In summer 2023, Montgomery led the longest study of a genetically engineered kidney xenotransplant in a human body to date. The pig kidney was observed for two months in a neurologically deceased human, and maintained optimal kidney function throughout the study.

== Awards and recognition ==
He received the Genius Award from the Liberty Science Center in 2022.

He was elected to the National Academy of Medicine in 2023.

He received the Jacobson Innovation Award from the American College of Surgeons in 2024.

== Marriage and health ==
Montgomery is married to opera singer Denyce Graves. His favorite opera is Carmen. He has a transplanted heart.
