= Robert I. Grossman =

American physician-researcher

Robert I. Grossman is an American physician-researcher. He is the former dean of NYU Grossman School of Medicine (formerly NYU School of Medicine) and chief executive officer of NYU Langone Health (formerly NYU Medical Center).

== Early life and education ==
In 1969, Grossman earned a bachelor of science degree in biology from Tulane University, where he was a Tulane Scholar. He was elected to Phi Beta Kappa. In 1973, he earned a medical degree from the University of Pennsylvania School of Medicine and was elected Alpha Omega Alpha.

Grossman completed an internship at Beth Israel Hospital in Boston, Massachusetts, two years of a neurosurgery residency at the Hospital of the University of Pennsylvania in Philadelphia, Pennsylvania, a radiology residency at the Hospital of the University of Pennsylvania, and a neuroradiology fellowship at Massachusetts General Hospital. He is board certified in diagnostic radiology.

== Career ==
=== Academic appointments ===
Grossman joined the faculty of the University of Pennsylvania School of Medicine as an assistant instructor in the Department of Neurosurgery. He later served as chief of neuroradiology, associate chairman of the Department of Radiology, and professor of radiology, neurosurgery, and neurology.

In 2001, he was appointed the Louis Marx Professor of Radiology, Chairman of the Department of Radiology, and professor of neurology, neurosurgery, and neuroscience and physiology at NYU School of Medicine.

In 2007, he was named dean of NYU School of Medicine, later renamed NYU Grossman School of Medicine, and chief executive officer of NYU Medical Center, later renamed NYU Langone Health. NYU Langone is one of the largest health systems in the Northeast.

In 2025, Grossman retired from his role as dean of NYU Grossman School of Medicine CEO of NYU Langone. He has assumed a new role as executive vice president to the NYU Langone Health Board of Trustees.

=== Research ===
Grossman has been awarded over 25 grants from the National Institutes of Health (NIH). In 1999, he was one of ten scientists in the U.S. to receive the Javits Neuroscience Investigator Award from the NIH. The nearly $4 million grant supported his ongoing research on multiple sclerosis. Grossman was a member of the Diagnostic Radiology Study Section at the NIH and served as its chairman. He was also a member of the NIH's National Advisory Council for Biomedical Imaging and Bioengineering.

=== Milestones ===
In 2008, Grossman launched a decade-long Campus Transformation Plan, an infrastructure modernization program that has expanded NYU Langone's footprint to more than 14 million square feet of clinical, educational, and research space across its campuses in Manhattan, Brooklyn, and Long Island.

On October 29, 2012, he oversaw the safe evacuation of 322 patients during Hurricane Sandy, which flooded NYU Langone Health's midtown Manhattan campus with more than 15 million gallons of water from the East River, inflicting more than $1 billion of damage to the institution's infrastructure and forcing a temporary shutdown. Grossman coordinated restoration efforts and NYU Langone Health was able to reopen major clinical units on December 27, 2012.

In 2013, he established an accelerated three-year MD pathway for select medical students to ease the financial burden of medical school and launch medical careers one year earlier than traditional students. The initiative made NYU School of Medicine the first nationally ranked medical school in the U.S. to enable medical students to graduate in three years, providing a directed pathway into any one of NYU Langone's twenty residency programs and accelerated entry into a variety of medical specialties. A paper published in Academic Medicine shows that graduates who went to medical school for three years performed equally well on tests of skill and knowledge as their peers who followed a four-year program. The study, led by Joan F. Cangiarella, MD, the Elaine Langone Professor of Pathology in the Department of Pathology at NYU Grossman School of Medicine, represents the largest analysis of three-year MD programs introduced in the last decade.

In 2018, the medical school implemented full-tuition scholarships for all current and future students in NYU School of Medicine's MD degree program, making the school the first top-10-ranked medical school in the nation to provide full-tuition scholarships to all of its students.

In 2024, NYU Langone Health was ranked the #1 comprehensive academic medical center for quality in the U.S. by Vizient, Inc., the nation's largest healthcare performance improvement organization. In 2024, NYU Langone's revenue was $14.2 billion, including more than $5 billion in philanthropy since 2007.

== Awards and honors ==
In 2004, Grossman was the first recipient of the Outstanding Contributions in Research Award from the Foundation of the American Society of Neuroradiology.

In 2010, he received the Gold Medal from the International Society for Magnetic Resonance in Medicine for his research in magnetic resonance imaging and was awarded an honorary doctorate from the University of Bordeaux, France. He also received the Distinguished Graduate Award from the University of Pennsylvania School of Medicine.

In 2013, he was named a "Living Landmark" by the New York Landmarks Conservancy for his leadership during Hurricane Sandy, when he oversaw the safe evacuation of 322 patients from NYU Langone's midtown Manhattan campus.

In 2018, he was named to Time magazine's inaugural "Health Care 50" list of the 50 most influential healthcare leaders who changed the state of healthcare in America.

In 2019, he was awarded the Lifetime Achievement of the Emeritus Class Award by Tulane University.

In 2021, he was an American Society of Neuroradiology Gold Medal Award recipient.

In 2022, he was elected to the American Academy of Arts and Sciences.

In 2024, he received the Distinguished Alumni Award from Tulane University.

In 2025, Dr. Grossman was recognized with the Award of Distinction from Healthcare Leaders of New York and a Doctor of Science honoris causa degree by New York University.

== Professional and scientific societies ==
Grossman is a member of the American Society of Neuroradiology and a fellow of the International Society for Magnetic Resonance in Medicine.

=== Boards ===
- Tulane University (2015–present)
- Greater New York Hospital Association; past chair

=== Editorial boards ===
- American Journal of Neuroradiology; past Editor-in-Chief

== Personal life ==
Grossman is married to Elisabeth J. Cohen, a physician-researcher, who serves as vice chair for academic affairs and professor of ophthalmology in the Department of Ophthalmology at NYU Grossman School of Medicine. She is the study chair and principal investigator for the Zoster Eye Disease Study, a multicenter, international, randomized, placebo-controlled clinical trial supported by the National Eye Institute, part of the National Institutes of Health. Grossman and Cohen have two sons.

== Publications ==
Grossman has published more than 330 articles in professional and scientific journals and has authored and co-authored several journals:

- Grossman RI, Yousem DM (2003) Neuroradiology: The Requisites (second edition), Mosby ISBN 978-0-323-00508-1
- Yousem DM, Grossman RI, (2010) Neuroradiology: The Requisites (third edition), Mosby ISBN 978-0-323-04521-6
- Filippi M, Grossman RI, Comi G. (2012) Magnetic Resonance Techniques in Clinical Trials in Multiple Sclerosis, Springer Milan; ISBN 978-88-470-2153-2
- Filippi M, Grossman RI, Comi G (1999). Magnetization Transfer Imaging in Multiple Sclerosis. Lippincott Williams & Wilkins
- Grossman RI, Yousem DM, C. Arbós (translator) (2013). Neurorradiologia, Marban; ISBN 978-84-7101-478-8

In 2024, Grossman penned an op-ed published in The Wall Street Journal encouraging the Liaison Committee on Medical Education to review the way medical schools are evaluated and accredited.

In 2025, Grossman published an article in Radiology on the characteristics of effective leaders and the critical roles they play in successful organizations.
