= List of Messianic Jewish organizations =

Messianic Judaism is a religious movement that arose in the 1960s and 1970s. Its members declared themselves as followers of Judaism and believers in Yeshua (Jesus). Messianic Judaism is not accepted as a valid form of Judaism by most Jewish communities, who have declared it as a form of Christianity.

== Associations of congregations ==
Name	Formed	Focus	Current (or last) Leader	Headquartered In
Chosen People Ministries	1894 by Leopold Cohn	Chosen People Ministries, formerly known as the American Board of Missions to the Jews, is an organization founded in 1894 by Leopold Cohn as the Brownsville Mission to Jews. It purpose is to convince Jews that worship of Jesus is compatible with Judaism. It currently focuses on the production of evangelistic material geared towards converting Jews and material which links aspects of the Torah as the Passover Seder with Jesus.	Mitch Glaser	New York City
Menorah Ministries	1984	Menorah Ministries is a nonprofit Messianic Jewish organization focused on sharing the belief in Jesus (Yeshua) as the Messiah, particularly with Jewish audiences. Its stated mission includes communicating this message to Jewish people, creating a model Messianic synagogue for both Jewish and Gentile believers, and producing materials to support outreach, discipleship, and training. The organization also emphasizes educating Christians about the Jewish roots of their faith, promoting greater understanding of Jewish culture within the broader church, and opposing antisemitism. In support of these goals, it offers classes, seminars, and a range of educational resources aimed at deepening understanding of biblical Jewish foundations and effective communication of faith.	Rabbi Dr. John Fischer and Patrice Fischer	Palm Harbor, Florida
Messianic Jewish Alliance of America (MJAA)	1915	Formerly known as Hebrew Christian Alliance of America, MJAA renamed itself in 1975 to Messianic Jewish Alliance of America to change tactics in evangelism and to coincide with terminology changes in the wider movement.	MJAA General secretary Joel Chernoff	Springfield, Pennsylvania
Jews for Jesus	1973 by Moishe Rosen	Jews for Jesus is a Messianic Jewish non-profit organization founded in 1973 which seeks to share its belief that Jesus is the promised Messiah of the Jewish people.	David Brickner	San Francisco
Union of Messianic Jewish Congregations	1979	Cooperating congregations focused on relational unity of Jews and Gentiles in the Messiah.	Jeffrey Seif, Executive Director	Albuquerque, New Mexico
Messianic Jewish Fellowship International	2016	Jews who consider themselves descendants of the first Jewish messianic community in Jerusalem. Converts are welcome, the Old Testament is accepted as well as the four Gospels of the New Testament. The remaining books of the New Testament are understood as additional inspirations from God. No membership fees, non-profit. The Fellowship is running the Jewish University of Colorado, the only Messianic Jewish university worldwide.	William Smith sr., Primus inter pares.	Los Angeles, Fort Lauderdale, Denver, Boise
Jewish University of Colorado (JUC)	1980	The only messianic Jewish university which is fully accredited and tuition-free. It is funded by the Messianic Jewish Fellowship International, a religious society under the law of the State of Colorado (CO Rev Stat § 7-50-101 [2020]). Consequently, JUC is a strictly ecclesiastical not-for-profit institution providing higher education in the broad field of theology. Under Colorado law, specifically CO Rev Stat § 7-50-105 (2020), the Jewish University of Colorado is permitted to operate similarly to any secular university within the state. This provision allows JUC to award and grant degrees, equivalent to other universities, under the laws of the State of Colorado. JUC meets all state requirements for religious exemption as stipulated in CO Rev Stat § 7-50-105 (2020).	Dean Bill Jefferson	Denver and global
TTN - The Torah Network	2021	The Torah Torah Network (TTN) is a social platform catering to followers of Yeshua worldwide who adhere to Torah principles. It provides a space for individuals to convene and exchange their interpretations and insights on the entirety of the Bible.	Rhy Bezuidenhout	Leeds, United Kingdom
Messianic Covenant Fellowship International (MCFI)	2025	MCFI promote Messianic through education, mission, evangelism, and congregation planting. The organization emphasizes Torah observance within a New Covenant framework, targeting unreached regions like Asia.	Dr Boaz Kok, President	United States and Asia
