= Hebrew Christian Prayer Union =

The Hebrew Christian Prayer Union may refer to two Hebrew Christian organizations:

- Hebrew Christian Prayer Union of London, founded by Henry Aaron Stern in 1882, included into the Hebrew Christian Alliance of Great Britain.
- The Hebrew Christian Prayer Union (America), informally organised 1813 under the sponsorship of the Rev. Philip Milledoler of the Reformed Dutch Church, incorporated 1820-1867 American Society for Meliorating the Condition of the Jews, then wound up. Now included into the Hebrew Christian Alliance of America.
