= Messianic Judaism =

Protestant Christian religious sect

Messianic Judaism is a syncretic Protestant Christian religious sect that incorporates elements of Jewish practice. It considers itself to be a form of Judaism but is generally considered to be a form of Christianity, including by all mainstream Jewish religious movements. Its roots are in Christian missionary activity aimed at Jews in the 19th and 20th centuries, particularly in North America.

Messianic Jews believe that Jesus was the Messiah and a divine being in the form of God the Son (a member of the Trinity), thus taking characteristically Christian positions on distinctions that number among those that most strongly distinguish Christianity and Judaism. Messianic Judaism is also generally considered a Protestant Christian sect by scholars and other Christian groups.

It emerged in the United States between the 1960s and 1970s from the earlier Hebrew Christian movement, and was most prominently propelled through the non-profit organization Jews for Jesus founded in 1973 by Martin "Moishe" Rosen, an American minister in the Conservative Baptist Association.

Messianic Jews adhere to conventional Christian doctrine, including the concept of salvation by believing in Jesus (referred to by the Hebrew name Yeshua among adherents) as the Jewish Messiah and humanity's redeemer, and in the spiritual authority of the Bible (including the Hebrew Bible and New Testament).

In Hebrew, Messianics tend to identify themselves with the terms maaminim (מאמינים, lit. 'believers') and yehudim (יְהוּדִים, lit. 'Jews') in opposition to being identified as notzrim (נוצרים, lit. 'Christians'). (Note: Followers are called either יְהוּדִים מְשִׁיחִיִּים y'hudím mešiḥiyim; Yehudim Meshikiyim or simply נוֹצְרִים nocirim (Christians).) Jewish organizations inside and outside of Israel reject this framing. The Supreme Court of Israel declared Messianic Judaism a Christian sect for purposes of the Law of Return.

== Demographics ==
From 2003 to 2007, the movement grew from 150 Messianic houses of worship in the United States to as many as 438, with over 100 in Israel and more worldwide; congregations are often affiliated with larger Messianic organizations or alliances. As of 2012, Messianic population estimates were between 175,000 and 250,000 members in the United States. As of 2025, Messianic populations include roughly 30,000 members in Israel, and an estimated total worldwide membership of up to 1.5 million.

== History ==
=== Pre-19th century ===
Efforts by Jewish Christians to proselytize to Jews began in the 1st century, when Paul the Apostle preached at the synagogues in each city that he visited. However, by the 4th century CE, non-biblical accounts of missions to the Jews (Note: Such as Epiphanius of Salamis' record of the conversion of Count Joseph of Tiberias and Sozomen's accounts of other Jewish conversions.) do not mention converted Jews playing any leading role in proselytization. Notable converts from Judaism who attempted to convert other Jews are more visible in historical sources beginning around the 13th century when Jewish convert Pablo Christiani attempted to convert other Jews. This activity, however, typically lacked any independent Jewish-Christian congregations and was often imposed through force by organized Christian churches.

=== 19th and early 20th centuries ===
In the 19th century, some groups attempted to create congregations and societies of Jewish converts to Christianity, though most of these early organizations were short-lived. Early formal organizations run by converted Jews include the Anglican London Society for promoting Christianity among the Jews of Joseph Frey (1809), which published the first Yiddish New Testament in 1821; the "Beni Abraham" association, established by Frey in 1813 with a group of 41 Jewish Christians who started meeting at Jews' Chapel, London for prayers Friday night and Sunday morning; and the London Hebrew Christian Alliance of Great Britain founded by Dr. Carl Schwartz in 1866.

The September 1813 meeting of Frey's "Beni Abraham" congregation at the rented "Jews' Chapel" in Spitalfields is sometimes pointed to as the birth of the semi-autonomous Hebrew Christian movement within Anglican and other established churches in Britain. However, the minister of the chapel at Spitalfields evicted Frey and his congregation three years later, and Frey severed his connections with the society. A new location was found and the Episcopal Jew's Chapel Abrahamic Society registered in 1835.

In Eastern Europe, Joseph Rabinowitz established a Hebrew Christian mission and congregation called "Israelites of the New Covenant" in Kishinev, Bessarabia, in 1884. In 1865, Rabinowitz created a sample order of worship for Sabbath morning service based on a mixture of Jewish and Christian elements. Mark John Levy pressed the Church of England to allow members to embrace Jewish customs.

In the United States, a congregation of Jewish converts to Christianity was established in New York City in 1885. In the 1890s, immigrant Jewish converts to Christianity worshipped at the Methodist "Hope of Israel" mission on New York's Lower East Side while retaining some Jewish rites and customs. In 1895, the 9th edition of Hope of Israel's Our Hope magazine carried the subtitle "A Monthly Devoted to the Study of Prophecy and to Messianic Judaism", the first use of the term "Messianic Judaism". In 1894, Christian missionary Leopold Cohn, a convert from Judaism, founded the Brownsville Mission to the Jews in the Brownsville neighborhood of Brooklyn, New York as a Christian mission to Jews. After several changes in name, structure, and focus, the organization is now called Chosen People Ministries.

In the early 1900s, there was a community of Messianic Jews in South Africa representing themselves as "Christian Jews" whose goal was to create a "true and genuine Christ-loving Jewish Christian Synagogue".

Missions to the Jews saw a period of growth between the 1920s and the 1960s. In the 1940s and 1950s, missionaries in Israel, including the Southern Baptists, adopted the term meshichyim (משיחיים, "messianics") to counter negative connotations of the word notsrim (נוצרים, "Christians"). The term was used to designate all Jews who had converted to Protestant Evangelical Christianity.

=== Modern-day Messianic Judaism movement, 1960s onwards ===
The Messianic Jewish movement emerged in the United States in the 1960s. Prior to this time, Jewish converts assimilated into gentile Christianity, as the church required abandoning their Jewishness and assuming gentile ways to receive baptism. Peter Hocken postulates that the Jesus movement, which swept the nation in the 1960s, triggered a change from Hebrew Christians to Messianic Jews and was a distinctly charismatic movement. These Jews wanted to "stay Jewish while believing in Jesus". This impulse was amplified by the results of the Six-Day War and the restoration of Jerusalem to Jewish control.

In 2018 Vered Hillel became the first woman to be ordained as a rabbi by the Messianic Jewish Rabbinical Council.

==== Foundational organizations ====
In 2004, there were 300 Messianic congregations in the United States, with roughly half of all attendants being Gentiles and roughly one-third of all congregations comprising 30 or fewer members. Many of these congregations belong to the International Association of Messianic Congregations and Synagogues (IAMCS), the Union of Messianic Congregations (UMJC), or Tikkun International.

The Messianic Jewish Alliance of America (MJAA) began in 1915 as the Hebrew Christian Alliance of America (HCAA). As the idea of maintaining Jewish identity spread in the late 1960s, the Hebrew Christian Alliance of America (HCAA) changed its name to the Messianic Jewish Alliance of America (MJAA). David Rausch writes that the change "signified far more than a semantical expression—it represented an evolution in the thought processes and religious and philosophical outlook toward a more fervent expression of Jewish identity." As of 2005, the MJAA was an organization of Jewish members who welcome non-Jews as "honored associates". In 1986, the MJAA formed a congregational branch called the International Alliance of Messianic Congregations and Synagogues (IAMCS).

In June 1979, 19 congregations in North America met at Mechanicsburg, Pennsylvania, and formed the Union of Messianic Jewish Congregations (UMJC). In 2022, it would have 75 congregations in 8 countries. In 2016, Douglas Hamp founded The Way Congregation near Denver, CO. with the concept of recognizing fundamentalist Christian beliefs and yet embracing One Law Theology, Two House Theology (see sections below), and Commonwealth Theology. Their website states the fellowship was founded "to serve as a bridge between the Jews and the gentile Church." Non-Jewish congregants are not encouraged to convert to Judaism and Jewish attendants are encouraged to celebrate their Jewish heritage. Hamp blames the heretic Marcion for mainstream Christianity's juxtaposition of Law and Grace. On the other hand, the Congregation meets on the Sabbath, celebrates the Feasts, and teaches conformance to the Dietary Laws given through Moses.

== Messianic Seal of Jerusalem ==
The Messianic Seal

The "Messianic Seal of Jerusalem" is a symbol used by Messianic Judaism. It is a depiction of the Temple menorah, an ancient symbol of Judaism, together with the ichthys, a depictive representation of Christianity, intersected by a Star of David.

There is an ongoing dispute as to whether the seal dates from the 1st century CE or if it is a 20th-century invention.

Other symbols of Messianic Judaism include a cross inside a Star of David; a dolphin; and a lit menorah.

== Theology and core doctrines ==
=== The Trinity ===
Many Messianic Jews affirm the doctrine of the Trinity: God the Father, God the Son, and God the Holy Spirit as three representations of the same divinity.

1. God the Father: Messianic Jews believe in God, and that he is all-powerful, omnipresent, eternally existent outside of creation, and infinitely significant and benevolent. Some Messianic Jews affirm both the Shema and the Trinity, understanding the phrase "the LORD is One" to be referring to "a differentiated but singular deity", and "eternally existent in plural oneness".
2. God the Son: Most Messianic Jews consider Jesus to be the Messiah and divine as God the Son, in line with mainstream Christianity, and will even pray directly to him. Many also consider Jesus to be their "chief teacher and rabbi" whose life should be copied.
3. God the Holy Spirit: According to some Messianic Jews, the Spirit is introduced in the Old Testament, is the inspirer of prophets, and is the spirit of truth described in the New Testament.

=== God, Jesus, and the Holy Spirit ===
1. God the Father: Some Messianic Jews profess only a strict view of monotheism, rejecting Trinitarian doctrine and Arian doctrine.
2. Jesus the Son of God: Some Messianic Jews, who reject Trinitarian doctrine and Arian doctrine, believe that the Jewish Messiah is the son of God in the general sense (Jewish people are children of God) and that the Jewish Messiah is a mere human, the promised Prophet. Some Messianic Jews believe Jewish Messiah is the pre-existent Word of God, the mighty God, and the only begotten God. Some congregations do not directly ascribe divinity to Jesus, considering him a man, yet not just a man, fathered by the Holy Spirit, who became the Messiah. Even others consider him "Word made flesh" and the "human expression of Divinity".
3. The Holy Spirit (Hebrew: רוח הקודש, ruach ha-kodesh) refers to the divine force, or to the word or spirit of God.

=== Scriptures and writings ===
==== The Bible ====
Both the Hebrew Bible and the New Testament (Note: The name of the New Testament is often translated back into Hebrew as "Brit Chadasha". This directly means "New Covenant", however "Testament" is traditionally taken from the Latin translation of Chadasha ("testamentum"), and therefore can mean both English words.) are usually considered to be the established and divinely inspired biblical scriptures by Messianic Jews. With a few exceptions, Messianic believers generally consider the written Torah, the five books of Moses, to remain in force as a continuing covenant, revised by Jesus and the Apostles in the New Testament, that is to be observed both morally and ritually. Jesus did not annul the Torah, but its interpretation is revised through the Apostolic scriptures.

==== Jewish oral tradition ====
There is no unanimity among Messianic congregations on the issue of the Talmud and the Oral Torah. There are congregations which believe that adherence to the Oral Law, as encompassed by the Talmud, is against Messianic beliefs. Similarly, there are congregations which deny the authority of the Pharisees, believing that they were superseded, and their teachings contradicted, by Messianism. There are adherents which call rabbinic commentaries such as the Mishnah and the Talmud "dangerous", and state that followers of rabbinic and halakhic explanations and commentaries are not believers in Jesus as the Messiah. Other congregations are selective in their applications of Talmudic law, and may believe that the rabbinic commentaries such as the Mishnah and the Talmud, while historically informative and useful in understanding tradition, are not normative and may not be followed where they differ from the New Testament. Still others encourage a serious observance of Jewish halakha.

==== Messianic publications ====
David H. Stern has released a one-volume Jewish New Testament Commentary, providing explanatory notes from a Messianic Jewish point of view. Other New Testament commentary authors include Arnold Fruchtenbaum of Ariel Ministries, who has written commentaries on the Epistles, Judges and Ruth, Genesis, and 7 systematic doctrinal studies.

=== Sin and atonement ===
Some Messianic believers define sin as transgression of the Law of God and include the concept of original sin. Some adherents atone for their sins through prayer and repentance – the acknowledgment of the wrongdoing and seeking forgiveness for their sins (especially on Yom Kippur, the Day of Atonement). Disagreeing with these rites and practices, other Messianics hold to a belief that all sin (whether committed yet or not) is already atoned for because of Jesus's death and resurrection.

=== Evangelism and attitudes toward Jews and Israel ===
Messianic Jews believe God's people have a responsibility to spread his name and fame to all nations. It is believed that the Children of Israel were, remain, and will continue to be the chosen people of the God, and are central to his plans for existence. Most Messianic believers, whether Jewish or non-Jewish, can be said to oppose supersessionism (popularly referred to as replacement theology), the view that the Church has replaced Israel in the mind and plans of God.

According to certain branches of Messianic Judaism, Jews are individuals who have one or more Jewish parents, or who have undergone halakhic conversion to Judaism.

=== One Law theology ===
One Law theology (also known as "One Torah for All") teaches that anyone who is a part of Israel is obligated to observe the Covenant and its provisions as outlined in the Torah. Dan Juster of Tikkun, and Russ Resnik of the UMJC, have argued against the One Law movement's insistence on gentiles being required to observe the entirety of Torah in the same way as Jews. Tim Hegg, author and founder of the Messianic congregation Beit Hallel, responded to their article defending what he believes to be the biblical teaching of "One Law" theology and its implications concerning the obligations of Torah obedience by new Messianic believers from the nations. The Coalition of Torah Observant Messianic Congregations (CTOMC) likewise rejects bi-lateral Ecclesiology in favor of the One Torah for All (One Law) position.

=== Two House theology ===
Proponents of Two House theology espouse their belief that the phrase "House of Judah" in scripture refers to Jews, while "the House of Israel" refers to the Ten Lost Tribes of Israel, or Ephraim. Where scripture states the House of Israel and Judah will again be "one stick" (Ezekiel 37:15–23), it is believed to be referring to the End Times, immediately prior to the Second Coming, when many of those descended from Israel will come back to Israel. Advocates of this theology postulate that the reason so many gentiles convert to Messianic Judaism is that the vast majority of them are truly Israelites. Like One Law groups, the Two House movement has many superficial similarities to Messianic Judaism, such as their belief in the ongoing validity of the Mosaic Covenant. While much of the Two House teaching is based on interpretations of Biblical prophecy, the biggest disagreements are due to inability to identify the genealogy of the Lost Tribes. Organizations such as the Messianic Jewish Alliance of America and Union of Messianic Jewish Congregations have explicitly opposed the Two House teaching.

=== Supersessionism ===
Historically, Christianity has promoted supersessionism, a doctrine which implies or outright states that Christianity has superseded Judaism, and that the Mosaic Covenant of the Hebrew Bible has been superseded by the New Covenant of Jesus, wherein salvation is brought about by the grace of God and not by obedience to the Torah. This is generally complemented with the concept of God having transferred the status of "God's people" from the Jews to the Christian Church. Messianic Jews, in varying degrees, challenge both thoughts, and instead believing that although Israel has rejected Jesus, it has not forfeited its status as God's chosen people. Often cited is Romans 11:29: "for God's gifts and his call are irrevocable". The core of supersessionism, in which the Mosaic Covenant is canceled, is less agreed upon. Though the mitzvot may or may not be seen as necessary, most are still followed, especially the keeping of Shabbat and other holy days.

=== Eschatology ===
All Messianic Jews hold to certain eschatological beliefs such as the End of Days, the Second Coming of Jesus as the conquering Messiah, the re-gathering of Israel, a rebuilt Third Temple, a resurrection of the dead, and many believe in the Millennial Sabbath, although some are Amillenialist. Some Messianic Jews believe that all of the Jewish holidays, and indeed the entire Torah, intrinsically hint at the Messiah, and thus no study of the End Times is complete without understanding the major Jewish Festivals in their larger prophetic context. To certain believers, the feasts of Pesach and Shavuot were fulfilled in Jesus's first coming, and Rosh Hashanah, Yom Kippur, and Sukkot will be at his second. Some also believe in a literal 7000-year period for the human history of the world, with a Millennial Messianic kingdom prior to a final judgment.

== Religious practices ==
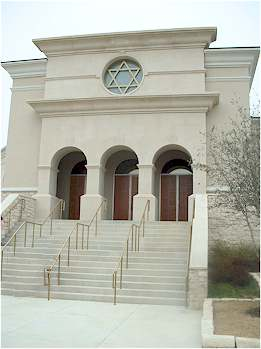
Baruch Hashem Messianic Synagogue in Dallas, Texas

=== Torah observance ===
There is a variety of practice within Messianic Judaism regarding the strictness of Torah observance. Generally, Torah observant congregations observe Jewish prayers, biblical feasts, and the Sabbath. While most traditional Christians deny that the ritual laws and specific civil laws of the Torah apply to gentiles, some Messianic believers say certain passages regarding Torah observance in the New Testament are cited by as proof that the Torah was not abolished for Jews. They say that in Acts 21:17–26, Jewish believers in Jerusalem are described as "zealous for the Law".

=== Sabbath and holiday observances ===
Some Messianic Jews observe Shabbat on Saturdays. Worship services are generally held on Friday evenings (Erev Shabbat) or Saturday mornings. According to the Southern Baptist Messianic Fellowship (SBMF), services are held on Saturday to "open the doors to Jewish people who also wish to keep the Sabbath". The liturgy used is similar to that of a Jewish siddur with some important differences including the omission of "salvation by works" as the Messianic belief is salvation through Jesus. Other branches of the movement have attempted to "eliminate the elements of Christian worship [such as frequent communion (Note: Communion in Messianic Judaism is often celebrated as a fully reenacted Passover Seder meal, in accordance with its description in the Synoptic Gospels, making it slightly more difficult to setup and more lengthy.)] that cannot be directly linked to their Jewish roots". Almost all such congregations in Israel observe Jewish holidays, which they understand to have their fulfillment in Jesus."

The Messianic Jewish Rabbinical Council recommends the observance of Jewish holidays. Most larger Messianic Jewish congregations follow Jewish custom in celebrating the three biblical feasts (Pesach, Shavuot, and Sukkot), as well as Yom Kippur and Rosh Hashanah.

=== Dietary laws ===
The observance of the kashrut dietary laws is a subject of continued debate among Messianic Jews. Some Messianic believers keep kosher purely for the purposes of evangelism to Jewish people. Most avoid pork and shellfish, but there is disagreement on more strict adherence to kosher dietary laws.

=== Conversion to Messianic Judaism ===
Large numbers of those calling themselves Messianic Jews are not of Jewish descent, but join the movement as they "enjoy the Messianic Jewish style of worship". Messianic perspectives on "Who is a Jew?" vary. The Messianic Jewish Rabbinical Council says a Jew is one born to a Jewish mother or who has converted to Judaism. Copying from the Reform stream of Judaism, the council also says a Jew is one who was born to a Jewish father but not a Jewish mother on the condition that the family of the child, or the individual as an adult, has undertaken public and formal acts of identification of the individual with the Jewish faith and people. The MJAA accepts gentiles into their congregations, but views gentiles and Jews as spiritually distinct and conversion as an "unbiblical practice".

==== Baptism ====
Messianic Jews practice baptism, calling it a mikveh ("cistern", from Leviticus 11:36) rather than the term tvila ("baptism" (טבילה) in the Hebrew New Testament).

==== Circumcision ====
Some within the Ephraimite movement seek to convert themselves for identification with Israel, but most Messianic governing bodies acknowledge the presence of gentiles in the congregations, and do not see a need for them to convert to worship in the Messianic style and understanding. When conversion is sincerely desired by a gentile Messianic believer, Messianic Jewish halachic standards (including circumcision) are imposed to maintain integrity among the world Messianic Jewish community.

=== Use of Hebrew names and vocabulary in English ===
The movement generally avoids common Christian terms, such as Jesus, Christ, or cross and prefers to use Hebrew or Aramaic terms.

== Culture ==
=== Music ===
Messianic Jewish hymns differ from evangelical Christian ones in their focus on Israel's role in history and messianic hope. Other differences include reference to Jesus—usually using the name Yeshua—as the "Savior of Israel". Messianic hymnals often incorporate Israeli songs. The movement has several recording artists who consider their music to be Messianic in message, such as Joel Chernoff of the duo Lamb, Ted Pearce, and Chuck King.

== Reception ==
=== Among mainstream Christianity ===
In the United States, the emergence of the Messianic Jewish movement created some stresses with other Jewish-Christian and missionary organization. In 1975, the Fellowship of Christian Testimonies to the Jews condemned several aspects of the Messianic Jewish movement.

In Israel, the linguistic distinction between Messianic Jews and mainstream Christians is less clear, and the name meshihiy (משיחי, 'messianic') is commonly used by churches in lieu of notsri (נוצרי, 'Christian'). The Israel Trust of the Anglican Church, based at Christ Church, Jerusalem, an organization that is ecumenical in outlook and operates an interfaith school in Jerusalem, gives some social support to Messianic Jews in Israel.

=== Among Jews ===
Opponents of Messianic Judaism, via traditional Jewish objections to Christian theology, hold that Christian proof texts, such as prophecies in the Hebrew Bible purported to refer the Messiah's suffering and death, have been taken out of context and misinterpreted. Jewish theology rejects the idea that the Messiah, or any human being, is a divinity. Belief in the Trinity is considered idolatrous by most rabbinic authorities. Even if considered shituf (literally, "partnership")—an association of other individuals with the God of Israel—this is only permitted for gentiles, and that only according to some rabbinic opinions. It is universally considered idolatrous for Jews. Further, Judaism does not view the role of the Messiah to be the salvation of the world from its sins, an integral teaching of Christianity and Messianic Judaism.

Jewish opponents of Messianic Judaism often focus their criticism on the movement's radical ideological separation from traditional Jewish beliefs, stating that the acceptance of Jesus as Messiah creates an insuperable divide between the traditional messianic expectations of Judaism, and Christianity's theological claims. They state that while Judaism is a messianic religion, its messiah is not Jesus, and thus the term is misleading. All denominations of Judaism, as well as national Jewish organizations, reject Messianic Judaism as a form of Judaism. The Central Conference of American Rabbis states that "'Jewish Christians' or 'Messianic Jews' have never been considered believers in Judaism." Regarding this divide, Reconstructionist Rabbi Carol Harris-Shapiro said: "To embrace the radioactive core of goyishness—Jesus—violates the final taboo of Jewishness. ... Belief in Jesus as Messiah is not simply a heretical belief, as it may have been in the first century; it has become the equivalent to an act of ethno-cultural suicide."

B'nai Brith Canada considers Messianic activities as antisemitic incidents. Rabbi Tovia Singer, founder of the anti-missionary organization Outreach Judaism, noted of a Messianic religious leader in Toledo: "He's not running a Jewish synagogue. ... It's a church designed to appear as if it were a synagogue and I'm there to expose him. What these irresponsible extremist Christians do is a form of consumer fraud. They blur the distinctions between Judaism and Christianity in order to lure Jewish people who would otherwise resist a straightforward message."

Association by a Jewish politician with a Messianic religious leader, inviting him to pray at a public meeting, even though made in error, resulted in nearly universal condemnation by Jewish congregations in Detroit in 2018, as the majority opinion in both Israeli and American Jewish circles is to consider Messianic Judaism as Christianity and its followers as Christians.

In 1999, Pardes Shalom Cemetery in Toronto, Canada, barred Reverend Malvern Jacobs from being buried in the cemetery as Jacobs had converted to Christianity and become a Messianic Jewish minister and dean of Canada Christian College's Jewish Studies department. Pardes Shalom locked its gates to prevent Jacobs's casket and his funeral procession of 400 mourners from entering the cemetery.

A small minority of Jewish scholars, notably Dan Cohn-Sherbok, have accepted the practice of Messianic Judaism as a legitimate Jewish religious expression within a "pluralistic model" of Judaism. By contrast, most other Jewish thinkers have placed Messianic Judaism outside of mainstream Jewish legitimacy and within the camp of the Christian faith. Some, like David Novak and Michael Wyschogrod, have come to the conclusion that Messianic Jews are still halachically Jews even though Messianic Judaism is not at all Jewish. In regard to Jews who convert to Christianity, Novak writes that "these great existential decisions are not meant to be cost-free. In any religious conversion, something is gained and something lost."

=== Response of Israeli government ===
A Messianic Jew's eligibility for the State of Israel's Law of Return depends on their Halakhic status; while those who are Jewish by halakha are excluded, those who are not Jewish by halakha may be eligible based on Jewish descent. An assistant to one of the two lawyers involved with an April 2008 Supreme Court of Israel case explained to the Jerusalem Post that Messianic Jews who are not Jewish according to Jewish rabbinic law, but who had sufficient Jewish descent to qualify under the Law of Return, could claim automatic new immigrant status and citizenship despite being Messianic. The state of Israel grants Aliyah (right of return) and citizenship to Jews, and to those with Jewish parents or grandparents who are not considered Jews according to halakha, such as people who have a Jewish father but a non-Jewish mother. The old law had excluded any "person who has been a Jew and has voluntarily changed his religion", and an Israeli Supreme Court decision in 1989 had ruled that Messianic Judaism constituted another religion. However, on April 16, 2008, the Supreme Court of Israel ruled in a case brought by a number of Messianic Jews with Jewish fathers and grandfathers. Their applications for Aliyah had been rejected on the grounds that they were Messianic Jews. The argument was made by the applicants that they had never been Jews according to halakha, and were not therefore excluded by the conversion clause. This argument was upheld in the ruling.

The International Religious Freedom Report 2008, released by the Bureau of Democracy, Human Rights, and Labor in the US, stated that discrimination against Messianic Jews in Israel was increasing. Some acts of violence have also occurred; in one incident on March 20, 2008, a bomb concealed as a Purim gift basket was delivered to the house of a prominent Messianic Jewish family in Ariel, in the West Bank, which severely wounded the son. Eventually, Yaakov Teitel was arrested for the attempted murder.

This antagonism has led to harassment and some violence, especially in Israel, where there is a large and militant Orthodox community. Several Orthodox organizations, including Yad L'Achim and Lehava, are dedicated to rooting out missionary activity in Israel, including the Messianic Jewish congregations. One tactic is to plaster posters asking Israelis to boycott shops where Messianic Jews are owners or employees; another is to report Messianic Jews to the Interior ministry, which is charged with enforcing an Israeli law forbidding proselytizing. In another incident, the mayor of Or Yehuda, a suburb of Tel Aviv, held a public book-burning of literature passed out to Ethiopian immigrants. He later apologized for the action. On other occasions, Lehava activists attempted to interrupt Messianic Jewish and violently harass the participants.

=== Response of US governments ===
The US Navy made a decision that Messianic Jewish chaplains must wear as their insignia the Christian cross, and not the tablets of the law, the insignia of Jewish chaplains. According to Yeshiva World News, the Navy Uniform Board commanded that Michael Hiles, a candidate for chaplaincy, wear the Christian insignia. Hiles resigned from the program, rather than wear the cross. Eric Tokajer, a spokesman for the Messianic Jewish movement, responded that "This decision essentially bars Messianic Jews from serving as chaplains within the U.S. Navy because it would require them to wear an insignia inconsistent with their faith and belief system."

A Birmingham, Alabama, police employee's religious discrimination case was settled in her favor after she filed suit over having to work on the Jewish Sabbath.

== Messianic organizations ==
- Chosen People Ministries (CPM)
- HaYesod (First Fruits of Zion)
- International Alliance of Messianic Congregations and Synagogues (IAMCS)
- Jewish University of Colorado
- Jews for Jesus (contested)
- Messianic Jewish Alliance of America (MJAA)
- Messianic Jewish Rabbinical Council
- Union of Messianic Jewish Congregations (UMJC)
- Messianic Covenant Fellowship International (MFCI)

== See also ==
- Black Hebrew Israelites
- Ebionites
- Hebrew Catholics
- Hebrew Roots
- Jews for Jesus
- Judeo-Christian
- Makuya
- Twelve Tribes of Israel (Rastafari)
- Xueta Christianity

== Works cited ==
- Ariel, David S. (1996). What Do Jews Believe? The Spiritual Foundations of Judaism. Schocken Books. ISBN 9780805210590.
- Ariel, Yaakov S. (2000). Evangelizing the chosen people: missions to the Jews in America, 1880–2000. Chapel Hill: University of North Carolina Press. ISBN 978-0-8078-4880-7. OCLC 43708450.
- Ariel, Yaakov (2005) [1995]. "Protestant Attitudes to Jews and Judaism During the Last Fifty Years". In Robert S. Wistrich (ed.). Terms of survival: the Jewish world since 1945 (Digital Printing ed.). London; New York: Routledge. ISBN 978-0-415-10056-4. LCCN 94022069.
- Ariel, Yaakov S. (2006). Gallagher, Eugene V.; Ashcraft, W. Michael (eds.). Jewish and Christian Traditions. Introduction to New and Alternative Religions in America. Vol. 2. Westport, Conn: Greenwood Publishing Group. ISBN 978-0-275-98714-5. LCCN 2006022954. OCLC 315689134.
- Ariel, Yaakov S. (2013). "2 The Evangelical Messianic Faith and the Jews". An Unusual Relationship: Evangelical Christians and Jews. New York University Press. pp. 35–57. doi:10.18574/nyu/9780814770689.003.0002. ISBN 9780814770689.
- Balmer, Randall Herbert (November 2004a) [2002]. "Chosen People Ministries". Encyclopedia of evangelicalism (Rev. and expanded ed.). Waco, Texas: Baylor University Press. ISBN 9781932792041. LCCN 2004010023.
- Balmer, Randall Herbert (November 2004) [2002]. "Messianic Judaism". Encyclopedia of evangelicalism (Rev. and expanded ed.). Waco, Texas: Baylor University Press. ISBN 9781932792041. LCCN 2004010023.
- Barnett, Paul (2002). "17.4 The Churches of Paul". Jesus & the Rise of Early Christianity: A History of New Testament Times. Westmont, Illinois: InterVarsity Press. ISBN 978-0-8308-2699-5. LCCN 99036943. "Nonetheless, Paul appears always to have preached first in the synagogues to offer his fellow Israelites the first opportunity to hear about their Messiah (cf. Rom 1:16)."
- Berger, David (February 28, 2003). Dabru Emet: Some Reservations about a Jewish Statement on Christians and Christianity. Inaugural meeting of the Council of Centers on Jewish-Christian Relations (CCJR) in Baltimore, October 28, 2002.
- Berkley, George E. (February 1997). Jews. Boston, Massachusetts: Branden Books. ISBN 978-0-8283-2027-6. LCCN 96047021.
- Brown, Michael L. (2000). General and Historical Objections. Answering Jewish Objections to Jesus. Vol. 1. Baker Books. ISBN 978-0801060632.
- Burgess, Stanley M., ed. (2006). "Messianic Jews". Encyclopedia of Pentecostal and Charismatic Christianity. Religion & Society. Vol. 7. London; New York: Routledge. ISBN 978-0415969666.
- Cohn-Sherbok, Dan (2000). Messianic Judaism. London; New York: Continuum. ISBN 978-0-8264-5458-4. LCCN 99050300.
- Cohn-Sherbok, Dan (2003). "Modern Hebrew Christianity and Messianic Judaism". In Tomson, Peter J.; Lambers-Petry, Doris (eds.). The Image of the Judaeo-Christians in Ancient Jewish and Christian Literature. Colloquium of the Institutum Iudaicum, Brussels 18–19 November 2001. Wissenschaftliche Untersuchungen zum Neuen Testament. Vol. 158. Tübingen: Mohr Siebeck. p. 287. ISBN 978-3-16-148094-2. Archived from the original on 2013-11-10.
- Cohn-Sherbok, Dan (2010). Judaism Today. London; New York: Continuum. ISBN 978-0-8264-3829-4. LCCN 2009045430.
- Feher, Shoshana (1998). Passing over Easter: Constructing the Boundaries of Messianic JudaismWalnut Creek, Ca. AltaMira Press. ISBN 978-0761989523.
- Flannery, Edward H. (1985) [1965]. "An Oasis and an Ordeal". The Anguish of the Jews: Twenty-Three Centuries of Antisemitism (3rd revised ed.). Paulist Press. ISBN 978-0-8091-4324-5. LCCN 85060298.
- Foreman, Esther (2006). "Messianic Judaism". In Clarke, Peter B. (ed.). Encyclopedia of new religious movements. London; New York: Routledge. pp. 397–399. ISBN 9-78-0-415-26707-6.
- Gidney, William Thomas (1908). The History of the London Society for Promoting Christianity Amongst the Jews: From 1809 to 1908. London Society for Promoting Christianity Amongst the Jews.
- Goble, Phillip E. (1974). Everything You Need to Grow a Messianic Synagogue (PDF). William Carey Library. ISBN 0878084215. LCCN 74-028017.
- Greenspoon, Leonard Jay, ed. (1998). Yiddish Language and Culture: Then and Now. Studies in Jewish Civilization. Vol. 9. Fordham University Press. ISBN 9781881871255. OCLC 59308743.
- Grudem, Wayne A. (1994). Systematic Theology: an introduction to biblical doctrine. Grand Rapids, Mich.: Zondervan. ISBN 978-0-310-28670-7. OCLC 29952151.
- Harries, Richard (August 2003). After the evil: Christianity and Judaism in the shadow of the Holocaust. New York, New York: Oxford University Press. ISBN 978-0-19-926313-4. LCCN 2003273342.
- Harris-Shapiro, Carol (1999). Messianic Judaism: A Rabbi's Journey through Religious Change in America. Boston: Beacon Press. ISBN 0807010405. LCCN 98054864.
- Hocken, Peter (2009). The Challenges of the Pentecostal, Charismatic, and Messianic Jewish Movements: The Tensions of the Spirit. Routledge. ISBN 978-0754667469.
- Juster, Dan (1995) [1985]. Jewish Roots: A Foundation of Biblical Theology. Shippensburg: Destiny Image. ISBN 1560431423. LCCN 94074707.
- Juster, Dan; Hocken, Peter (2004). The Messianic Jewish Movement: An Introduction (PDF) (booklet). TJCII Booklet Series. Vol. 1. Toward Jerusalem Council II.
- Kessler, Edward (2005). "Messianic Jews". In Kessler, Edward; Wenborn, Neil (eds.). A Dictionary Of Jewish-Christian Relations. Cambridge, England: Cambridge University Press. ISBN 978-0-521-82692-1. LCCN 2005012923.
- Kinzer, Mark S. (2005). Postmissionary Messianic Judaism: Redefining Christian Engagement with the Jewish People. Brazos Press. ISBN 9781587431524.
- Kinzer, Mark S. (2010). "Finding Our Way Through Nicaea: The Deity of Yeshua, Bilateral Ecclesiology, and Redemptive Encounter with the Living God". Kesher (24). San Diego: Messianic Jewish Theological Institute. Archived from the original on September 29, 2020.
- Kinzer, Mark S. (2018). "Beginning with the End: the Place of Eschatology in the Messianic Jewish Canonical Narrative". Kesher. 32. San Diego: Messianic Jewish Theological Institute.
- Kok, Boaz (2025). The Samaritan Upper Room (The Hidden Passover Plot That Changed History). MCFI. ISBN 979-8-2311-5962-8.
- Lewis, James R. (2001). Odd Gods: New Religions & the Cult Controversy. Prometheus Books. ISBN 978-1-57392-842-7.
- Lotker, Michael (May 2004). "It's More About What is the Messiah than Who is the Messiah". A Christian's guide to Judaism. New York, New York: Paulist Press. ISBN 978-0-8091-4232-3. LCCN 2003024813.
- Melton, J. Gordon, ed. (2005). "Messianic Judaism". Encyclopedia of Protestantism. Encyclopedia of World Religions. New York: Facts On File. p. 373. ISBN 0-8160-5456-8. Archived from the original on 2024-06-30.
- Moscrop, John James (2000). "Remembering Jerusalem: 1799–1839". Measuring Jerusalem: The Palestine Exploration Fund and British Interests in the Holy Land. A & C Black. ISBN 9780718502201.
- Nuesner, Jacob (February 2000) [1994]. "Come, Let us Reason Together". A Rabbi Talks With Jesus. Donald H. Akerson (forward) (Revised ed.). Canada: McGill-Queen's University Press. ISBN 978-0-7735-2046-2. LCCN 2001339789.
- Rausch, David (1982a). Messianic Judaism: Its History, Theology, and Polity. Texts and studies in religion. Vol. 14. Edwin Mellen Press. ISBN 9780889468030.
- Rausch, David A. (September 1982b). "The Messianic Jewish Congregational Movement". The Christian Century. 99 (28): 926.
- Reason, Gabriela (2005). "Competing Trends In Messianic Judaism: The Debate Over Evangelicalism". Kesher: A Journal of Messianic Judaism. 18 (Winter).
- Robinson, Rich (2005). The Messianic Movement: A Field Guide for Evangelical Christians. San Francisco: Purple Pomegranate Production. ISBN 978-1881022626.
- Schoeman, Roy H. (2003). Salvation is from the Jews: the role of Judaism in salvation history from Abraham to the Second Coming. San Francisco: Ignatius Press. ISBN 9780898709759. LCCN 2003105176.
- Schoen, Robert (April 2004). "Jews, Jesus, and Christianity". What I Wish My Christian Friends Knew about Judaism. Chicago: Loyola Press. ISBN 978-0-8294-1777-7. LCCN 2003024404.
- Simmons, Shraga (March 6, 2004). "Why Jews Don't Believe In Jesus". Aish HaTorah.
- Sobel, B.Z. (December 1968). "The Tools of Legitimation—Zionism and the Hebrew Christian Movement" (PDF). The Jewish Journal of Sociology. 10 (2).
- Spector, Stephen (2008). Evangelicals and Israel. Oxford University Press. ISBN 978-0195368024. LCCN 2008026681.
- "Editorial" (PDF). The Messianic Jew. Vol. 1, no. 1. Johannesburg: The Jewish Messianic Movement. December 1910.
