= Daniel Juster =

American Messianic Jewish leader

Daniel C. Juster (born 1947) is an author and advocate of Messianic Judaism. He has served in the Messianic Jewish movement since 1972.

== Early life ==
Juster was born to a Jewish father and a nominally-Christian mother. His father died when he was nine years old, and he has spoken of its effect on his life. Not having had a Jewish mother or upbringing, he would not be considered Jewish by any mainstream Jewish religious movement and was therefore able to immigrate to Israel as the non-Jewish relative of a Jew.

== Roles in the movement ==
He has had various leadership roles including:

- Pastor for over 27 years (including First Hebrew Christian Church in Chicago and Beth Messiah Congregation in Rockville, Maryland)
- Founding President (1979–1986) of the Union of Messianic Jewish Congregations (UMJC)
- General Secretary (1996–1998) of the UMJC
- Co-founder of Messianic Jewish Biblical Institute (MJBI)
- Professor in various institutes of higher learning.
- Juster is also a founding board member of Toward Jerusalem Council II.

== Current position ==
Juster presently serves as the Founder and Director of Tikkun International, a network of congregations and ministries in the United States and abroad dedicated to the restoration of Israel and the Church, which involves:

1. Training, sending out and supporting congregational planters in the US, Israel and other countries
2. Fostering Jewish ministry in local churches
3. Helping to support a full-time Bible and Graduate School of training leaders for the Messianic Jewish community
4. Sending people to preach and teach in conferences, evangelistic campaigns and Messianic congregations and churches.

== Notability ==
Juster helped to frame the differences between Hebrew Christianity and Messianic Judaism. Juster's book, Jewish Roots, presents a positive, critical approach to Rabbinic Judaism and is widely recognized as a foundational treatise on Messianic Judaism and its practice.

Juster is an acclaimed international speaker on the relationship of Israel and the Church and an author of several books relating the modern Church's responsibility to embrace Israel as a key to the Kingdom of God. His articles have been published in various periodicals such as People of Destiny, Christianity Today, Journal of the Evangelical Theological Society, Mishkan, and others.

Juster was honored with a Lifetime Sacrifice and Service Award (2009) from the Union of Messianic Jewish Congregations for his contributions to Messianic Judaism and advancement of theology.

== Education and Teaching ==
Juster has taught apologetics and theology since 1971 in many schools around the world. His academic background includes a B.A. in philosophy, Wheaton College; M.Div., McCormick Seminary; Philosophy of Religion Graduate Program, Trinity Evangelical Divinity School, and Th.D., New Covenant International Seminary, an unaccredited Florida seminary. Juster was adjunct professor at Fuller Seminary. He now teaches at The King's University in Van Nuys, California.

== Books ==
- Conveying A Heritage: A Messianic Jewish Guide to Home Practice
- Due Process: A Plea for Biblical Justice Among God's People
- Growing to Maturity
- Inclusion versus Replacement: A Reformed Theology for the Church
- Israel, the Church, and the Last Days
- Jewish Roots
- Jewishness and Jesus
- Models of Accountability
- Mutual Blessing: Discovering the Ultimate Destiny of Creation
- One People, Many Tribes
- Passion for Israel
- Passover: The Key that Unlocks the Book of Revelation
- Relational Leadership
- That They May be One
- The Biblical World View: An Apologetic
- The Dynamics of Spiritual Deception
- The Irrevocable Calling
