= Israelsunday =

Special religious day in the Netherlands

Israelsunday is in the Netherlands held on the first Sunday of October.

Israelsunday is a special Sunday for many Lutheran, Protestant and Reformed churches. Often the liturgy, sermon and collection are attuned to this Sunday. Churches, deputies and foundations provide preparatory material for the sermon and the child subsidiary service. The relationship between the Church and Israel is much discussed among Christians and there are different views. Because of this, Israel Sunday is also valued differently. The name Israelsunday does not intend to draw attention and limit prayers to the modern state of Israel. Topics of speaking and prayer include Jews worldwide, Messianics, the State of Israel, and the Palestinians.
