= Jewish Christianity =

Proto-Christian breakaway Jewish movement

Jewish Christianity is the historical foundation of Early Christianity, which later developed into Nicene Christianity (which comprises the Catholic, Protestant, Eastern Orthodox, Oriental Orthodox, and Church of the East traditions) and other Christian denominations. Jewish Christians were the followers of a Jewish religious sect that was viewed by the Sanhedrin as being heretical, which emerged in Roman Judea during the late Second Temple period, under the Herodian tetrarchy (1st century AD). These Jews believed that Jesus was the prophesied Messiah and they continued their adherence to Jewish law.

Christianity started with Jewish eschatological expectations, and it developed into the worship of Jesus as the result of his earthly ministry in Galilee and Jerusalem, his crucifixion, and the post-crucifixion experiences of his followers. Jewish Christians drifted apart from Second Temple Judaism, and their form of Judaism eventually became a minority strand within mainstream Judaism, as it had almost disappeared by the 5th century AD. Jewish–Christian gospels are lost except for fragments, so there is a considerable amount of uncertainty about the scriptures which were used by this group of Christians.

While previous scholarship viewed the First Jewish–Roman War and the destruction of the Second Temple (70 AD) as the main events, more recent scholarship tends to argue that the Bar Kochba revolt (132–136 AD) was the main factor in the separation of Christianity from Judaism. The split was a long-term process, in which the boundaries were not clear-cut.

== Etymology ==
Early Jewish Christians (i.e., the Jewish followers of Jesus) referred to themselves as followers of "The Way" (ἡ ὁδός: hė hodós), probably coming from John 14:6, "I am the way and the truth and the life. No one comes to the Father except through me." (Note: It appears in the Acts of the Apostles, Acts 9:2, Acts 19:9 and Acts 19:23. Some English translations of the New Testament capitalize 'the Way' (e.g. the New King James Version and the English Standard Version), indicating that this was how 'the new religion seemed then to be designated' whereas others treat the phrase as indicative—'the way', 'that way' or 'the way of the Lord'. The Syriac version reads, "the way of God" and the Vulgate Latin version, "the way of the Lord".)

According to Acts 11:26, the term Christian (Koine Greek: Χριστιανός) was first used in reference to the disciples of Jesus in the city of Antioch, meaning "followers of Christ", by the non-Jewish inhabitants of Antioch. The earliest recorded use of the term Christianity (Koine Greek: Χριστιανισμός) is attested by the ante-Nicene Father and theologian Ignatius of Antioch (c. 107 AD).

The term Jewish Christian is used in the academic fields of Biblical studies and historiography of early Christianity in order to distinguish the early Christians of Jewish origins from those of Gentile origins, both in discussion of the New Testament church and the 2nd and 3rd centuries AD.

== Origins ==
Christianity originated as a Jewish movement in Judaea during the 1st century AD, within the context of late Second Temple Judaism. The earliest followers of Jesus were Jews who understood his life, death and expected return through familiar Jewish apocalyptic and messianic frameworks. They remained embedded in Jewish religious life and did not initially conceive of themselves as departing from Israel or founding a new faith. Following their conviction that Jesus had been raised from the dead, they established a community in Jerusalem that awaited Jesus’s return and eschatological renewal, seeking to spread this message throughout Israel and the Jewish diaspora. (Note: Many scholars consider the Parousia in the gospels to be contingent, though with detractors. The timing of the end in early Christian expectation is also debated.) Early Jewish Christianity maintained a high Christology alongside monotheism. This early community was led by the three Pillars of the Church, namely James the Just, Peter, and John. What eventually became of this earliest Christ-following community remains unclear; they were possibly displaced, relocated, or killed when the Romans destroyed Jerusalem in 70 AD.

Meanwhile, as the message about Jesus spread beyond Judea and Galilee into the broader Greco-Roman world, it increasingly attracted Gentile adherents, especially among "God-fearers": non-Jews who were attracted to Judaism and participated in synagogal worship without fully converting. This created a challenge for the movement's Jewish religious outlook, which insisted on close observance of the Jewish commandments. Against this backdrop, Paul the Apostle, a Jew of the Pharisaic school who had initially persecuted the Jesus movement, became one of its most influential missionaries following his conversion, focusing on spreading the message to non-Jews in the Eastern Mediterranean. Paul argued that Gentiles could participate in the promises of Israel through exclusive devotion to the God of Israel, faith in Christ, baptism, and participation in his death and resurrection, without full adherence to the Torah, including circumcision. This had a formative effect on the emerging Christian identity as separate from Judaism. Over time, such developments contributed to the gradual differentiation between the Jesus movement and other Jewish communities, a process that resulted in the emergence of Christianity as a separate religion.

=== Jewish-Hellenistic background ===
==== Hellenism ====
Christianity arose as a separate movement within the syncretist Hellenistic world of the first century AD, dominated by Roman law and Greek culture. Hellenistic culture had a profound influence on the customs and practices of Jews, both in the Land of Israel and in the Diaspora. The inroads into Judaism gave rise to Hellenistic Judaism in the Jewish diaspora, which sought to establish a Hebraic-Jewish religious tradition within the culture and language of Hellenism.

According to Burton Mack and a minority of commentators, the Christian vision of Jesus's death for the redemption of humankind was only possible in a Hellenised milieu. (Note: Eddy & Boyd 2007, p. 136: "Burton Mack argues that Paul's view of Jesus as a divine figure who gives his life for the salvation of others had to originate in a Hellenistic rather than a Jewish environment. Mack writes, "Such a notion [of vicarious human suffering] cannot be traced to old Jewish and/ or Israelite traditions, for the very notion of a vicarious human sacrifice was anathema in these cultures. But it can be traced to a Strong Greek tradition of extolling a noble death." More specifically, Mack argues that a Greek "myth of martyrdom" and the "noble death" tradition are ultimately responsible for influencing the hellenized Jews of the Christ cults to develop a divinized Jesus." Eddy & Boyd (2007, p. 93) further note that "The most sophisticated and influential version of the hellenization thesis was forged within the German Religionsgeschichtliche Schule of the late nineteenth and early twentieth centuries—now often referred to as the "old history of religions school." Here, the crowning literary achievement in several ways is Wilhelm Bousset's 1913 work Kyrios Christos. Bousset envisions two forms of pre-Pauline Christianity: [1. In the early Palestinian community, and 2. In the Hellenistic communities.]")

==== Jewish sects ====
During the early first century AD, there were many competing Jewish sects in the Holy Land, and those that became Rabbinic Judaism and Proto-orthodox Christianity were but two of these. There were Pharisees, Sadducees, and Zealots, but also other less influential sects, including the Essenes. The first century BC and first century AD saw a growing number of charismatic religious leaders contributing to what would become the Mishnah of Rabbinic Judaism; the ministry of Jesus would lead to the emergence of the first Jewish Christian community.

The Gospels contain strong condemnations of the Pharisees, though there is a clear influence of Hillel's interpretation of the Torah in the Gospel sayings. However, certain laws followed the more stringent views of Shammai, such as regarding divorce. Belief in the resurrection of the dead in the Messianic age was a core Pharisaic doctrine.

==== Jewish and Christian messianism ====
Most of Jesus's teachings were intelligible and acceptable in terms of Second Temple Judaism. However, what set early Christians apart from Jews was their belief that Jesus was the Messiah. While Christianity acknowledges only one ultimate Messiah, Judaism can be said to hold to a concept of multiple messiahs. The two most frequently mentioned are the Messiah ben Joseph and the Messiah ben David. Some scholars have argued that the idea of two messiahs—one "suffering" and the other fulfilling the traditionally conceived messianic role—was normative to ancient Judaism, predating Jesus, as can be seen from the Dead Sea Scrolls. Many would have viewed Jesus as one or both.

Jewish messianism has its root in the apocalyptic literature of the 2nd century BC to the 1st century AD, promising a future "anointed" leader or Messiah to resurrect the Israelite "Kingdom of God", in place of the foreign rulers of the time. According to Shaye J.D. Cohen, the fact that Jesus did not establish an independent Israel, combined with his death at the hands of the Romans, caused many Jews to reject him as the Messiah. (Note: See for comparison: prophet and false prophet.) Jews at that time were expecting a military leader as a Messiah, such as Bar Kokhba.

Psalm 2 was another source of Jewish messianism, which was prompted by Pompey's conquest of Jerusalem in 63 BC. Early Christians cited this chapter to claim that Jesus was the Messiah and the son of god and negate Caesar's claim to the latter.

== Early Jewish Christianity ==
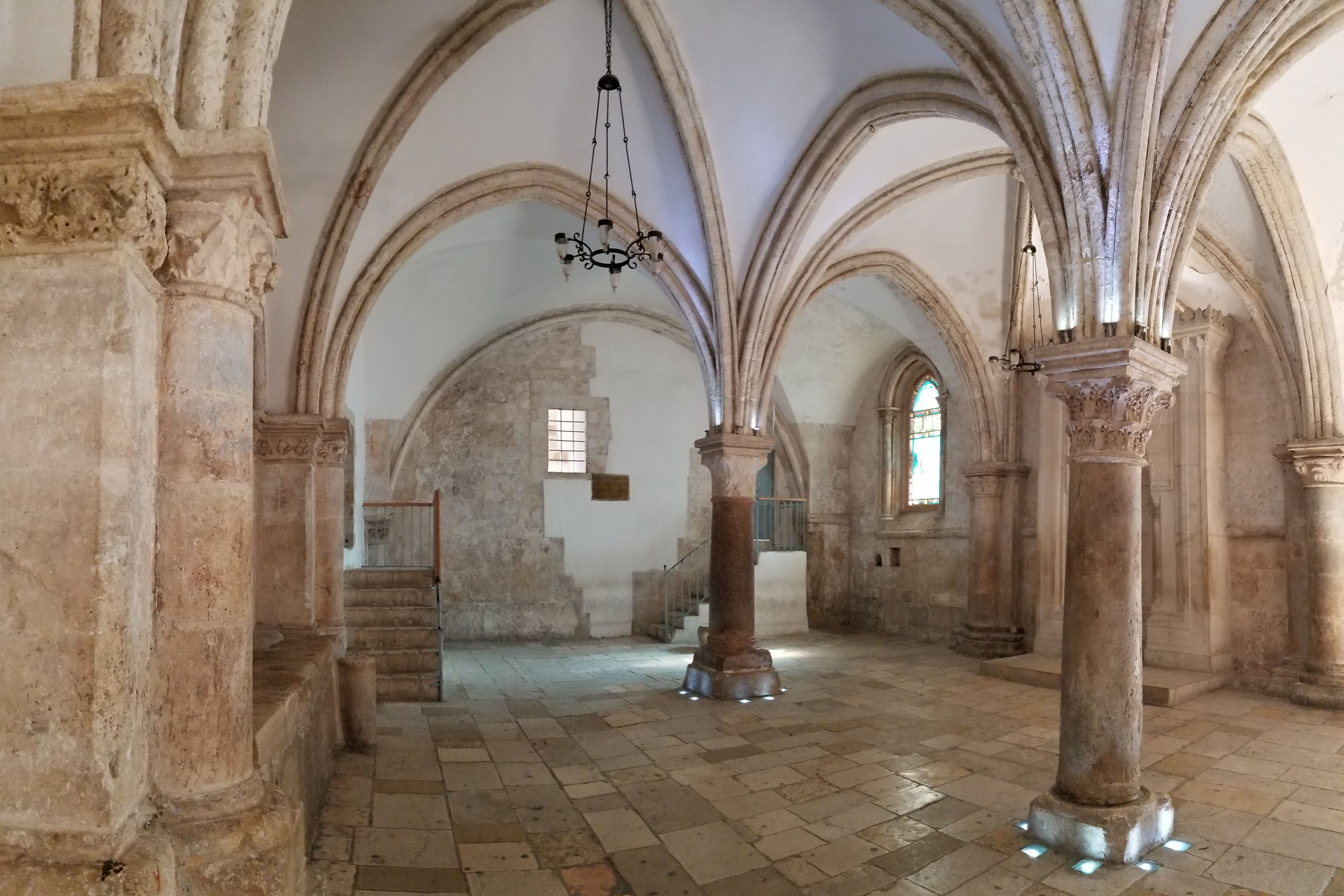
The Cenacle on Mount Zion in Jerusalem, claimed to be the location of the Last Supper and Pentecost, and center of Jewish Christians in the first century

Most historians agree that Jesus or his followers established a new Jewish sect, one that attracted both Jewish and gentile converts. The self-perception, beliefs, customs, and traditions of the Jewish followers of Jesus, Jesus's disciples and first followers, were grounded in first-century Judaism. According to New Testament scholar Bart D. Ehrman, a number of early Christianities existed in the first century AD, from which developed various Christian traditions and denominations, including proto-orthodoxy, Marcionites, Gnostics and the Jewish followers of Jesus. According to theologian James D. G. Dunn, four types of early Christianity can be discerned: Jewish Christianity, Hellenistic Christianity, Apocalyptic Christianity, and early Catholicism.

The first followers of Jesus were essentially all ethnically Jewish or Jewish proselytes. Jesus was Jewish, preached to the Jewish people, and called from them his first followers. According to McGrath, Jewish Christians, as faithful religious Jews, "regarded their movement as an affirmation of every aspect of contemporary Judaism, with the addition of one extra belief – that Jesus was the Messiah."

Conversely, Margaret Barker argues that early Christianity has roots in pre-Babylonian exile Israelite religion. The Expositor's Greek Testament interprets John 4:23 as being critical of Judaism and Samaritanism. John Elliott also characterizes early Christianity as an 'Israelite sect' or a 'renewal movement within Israel', where followers were called 'Galileans', 'Nazarenes' or members of 'the Way' by the native inhabitants of 1st century Judea. Paul the Apostle's criticism of the contemporary Jewish community most likely derive from Hebrew Bible theology rather than internalized antisemitism.

Jewish Christians were the original members of the Jewish movement that later became Christianity. In the earliest stage the community was made up of all those Jews who believed that Jesus was the Jewish messiah. As Christianity grew and developed, Jewish Christians became only one strand of the early Christian community, characterised by combining the confession of Jesus as Christ with continued observance of the Torah and adherence to Jewish traditions such as Sabbath observance, Jewish calendar, Jewish laws and customs, circumcision, kosher diet and synagogue attendance, and by a direct kinship ties to the earliest followers of Jesus.

=== Jerusalem ekklēsia ===
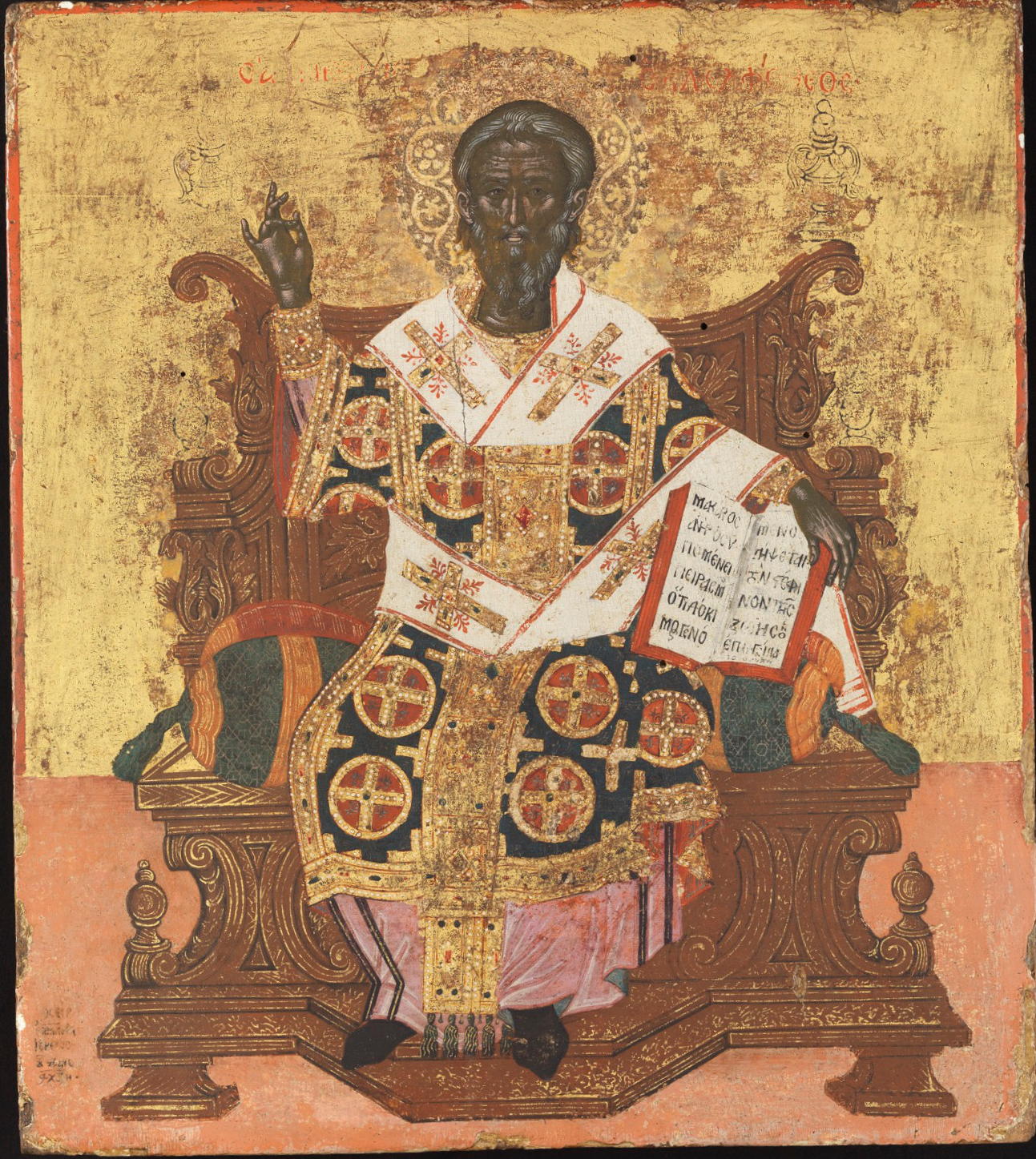
Icon of James by Emmanuel Tzanes, 1668

The Jerusalem Church was an early Christian community located in Jerusalem, of which James the Just, the brother of Jesus, and Peter were leaders. Paul was in contact with this community. Legitimised by Jesus' appearance, Peter was the first leader of the Jerusalem ekklēsia. He was soon eclipsed in this leadership by James the Just, "the Brother of the Lord," which may explain why the early texts contain scarce information about Peter. According to Lüdemann, in the discussions about the strictness of adherence to the Jewish Law, the more conservative view of James the Just became more widely accepted than the more liberal position of Peter, who soon lost influence. According to Dunn, this was not an "usurpation of power," but a consequence of Peter's involvement in missionary activities.

According to Eusebius' Church History 4.5.3–4: the first 15 Christian Bishops of Jerusalem were "of the circumcision". The Romans destroyed the Jewish leadership in Jerusalem in year 135 during the Bar Kokhba revolt, but it is traditionally believed the Jerusalem Christians waited out the Jewish–Roman wars in Pella in the Decapolis.

=== Beliefs ===
The Pauline epistles incorporate creeds, or confessions of faith, of a belief in an exalted Christ that predate Paul, and give essential information on the faith of the early Jerusalem Church around James, brother of Jesus. This group venerated the risen Christ, who had appeared to several persons, as in Philippians 2:6–11, the Christ hymn, which portrays Jesus as an incarnated heavenly being and a subsequently exalted one.

==== Messiah/Christ ====
Early Christians regarded Jesus to be the Messiah, the promised king who would restore the Jewish kingdom and independence. Jewish messianism has its root in the apocalyptic literature of the 2nd century BC to 1st century BC, promising a future "anointed" leader or messiah to restore the Israelite "Kingdom of God", in place of the foreign rulers of the time. This corresponded with the Maccabean Revolt directed against the Seleucid Empire. Following the fall of the Hasmonean kingdom, it was directed against the Roman administration of Judea Province, which, according to Josephus, began with the formation of the Zealots and Sicarii during the Census of Quirinius (6 AD), although full-scale open revolt did not occur until the First Jewish–Roman War in 66 AD.

==== Resurrection ====
According to the New Testament, people reported that they encountered Jesus after his crucifixion. They believed that he had been resurrected (belief in the resurrection of the dead in the Messianic Age was a core Pharisaic doctrine), and his resurrection provided the belief that he would soon return and fulfill the rest of Messianic prophecy such as the resurrection of the dead and the Last Judgment.

1 Corinthians 15:3-9 gives an early testimony, which was delivered to Paul, of the atonement of Jesus and the appearances of the risen Christ to "Cephas and the twelve", and to "James [...] and all the apostles", possibly reflecting a fusion of two early Christian groups:

3 For I delivered unto you first of all that which also I received: that Christ died for our sins according to the scriptures;

4 and that he was buried; and that he hath been raised on the third day according to the scriptures;
5 and that he appeared to Cephas; then to the twelve;
6 then he appeared to above five hundred brethren at once, of whom the greater part remain until now, but some are fallen asleep;
7 then he appeared to James; then to all the apostles;

8 and last of all, as to the [child] untimely born, he appeared to me also.

The later canonical gospels provide more detailed narratives about the resurrection of Jesus. The New Testament accounts do not describe the resurrection itself, but rather accounts of appearances of Jesus. Jesus is described as the "firstborn from the dead", prōtotokos, the first to be raised from the dead, thereby acquiring the "special status of the firstborn as the preeminent son and heir". (Note: Justin S. Holcomb, "What Does It Mean that Jesus Is 'The Firstborn from the Dead?'") Scholars debate on the historicity of specific details of these narratives such as the empty tomb and burial of Jesus along with the resurrection itself. While Conservative Christian scholars argue in favor of a real, concrete, material resurrection of a transformed body, (Note: Habermas (2005), Research from 1975 to the Present: What are Critical Scholars Saying?) secular and Liberal Christian scholars typically argue in favor of more naturalistic explanations, such as the vision theory. Other scholars such as Craig L. Blomberg argue that there are sufficient arguments for the historicity of the resurrection. According to Géza Vermes, the concept of resurrection formed "the initial stage of the belief in his exaltation", which is "the apogee of the triumphant Christ". The focal concern of the early communities is the expected return of Jesus, and the entry of the believers into the kingdom of God with a transformed body.

Proponents of the vision theory argue that cognitive dissonance influenced the inspiration for resurrection belief. According to Bart Ehrman, the resurrection appearances were a denial response to his disciples' sudden disillusionment following Jesus' death. According to Ehrman, some of his followers claimed to have seen him alive again, resulting in a multitude of stories which convinced others that Jesus had risen from death and was exalted to Heaven. (Note: Ehrman: "What started Christianity was the Belief in the Resurrection. It was nothing else. Followers of Jesus came to believe he had been raised. They did not believe it because of "proof" such as the empty tomb. They believed it because some of them said they saw Jesus alive afterward. Others who believed these stories told others who also came to believe them. These others told others who told others – for days, weeks, months, years, decades, centuries, and now millennia. Christianity is all about believing what others have said. It has always been that way and always will be. Easter is the celebration of the first proclamation that Jesus did not remain dead. It is not that his body was resuscitated after a Near Death Experience. God had exalted Jesus to heaven never to die again; he will (soon) return from heaven to rule the earth. This is a statement of faith, not a matter of empirical proof. Christians themselves believe it. Non-Christians recognize it as the very heart of the Christian message. It is a message based on faith in what other people claimed and testified based on what others claimed and testified based on what others claimed and testified – all the way back to the first followers of Jesus who said they saw Jesus alive afterward.) According to Paula Fredriksen, Jesus's influence on his followers was so great that they could not accept the failure implicit in his death. According to Fredriksen, before his death Jesus created amongst his believers such certainty that the Kingdom of God and the resurrection of the dead was at hand, that with few exceptions (John 20: 24–29) when they saw him shortly after his execution, they had no doubt that he had been resurrected, and the general resurrection of the dead was at hand. These specific beliefs were compatible with Second Temple Judaism.

According to N.T. Wright, "there is substantial unanimity among the early Christian writers (first and second century) that Jesus had been bodily raised from the dead," "with (as the early Christians in their different ways affirmed) a 'transphysical' body, both the same and yet in some mysterious way transformed," reasoning that as a matter of "inference" both a bodily resurrection and later bodily appearances of Jesus are far better explanations for the empty tomb and the 'meetings' and the rise of Christianity than are any other theories. Rejecting the visionary theories, Wright notes that visions of the dead were always associated with spirits and ghosts, and never with bodily resurrection. Thus, Wright argues, a mere vision of Jesus would never lead to the unprecedented belief that Jesus was a physically resurrected corpse; at most, he would be perceived as an exalted martyr standing at the right hand of God.

According to Johan Leman, the resurrection must be understood as a sense of presence of Jesus even after his death, especially during the ritual meals which were continued after his death. His early followers regarded him as a righteous man and prophet, who was therefore resurrected and exalted. In time, Messianistic, Isaiahic, apocalyptic and eschatological expectations were blended in the experience and understanding of Jesus, who came to be expected to return to earth.

==== Bodily resurrection ====
A point of debate is how Christians came to believe in a bodily resurrection, which was "a comparatively recent development within Judaism." According to Dag Øistein Endsjø, "The notion of the resurrection of the flesh was, as we have seen, not unknown to certain parts of Judaism in antiquity", but Paul rejected the idea of bodily resurrection, and it also can't be found within the strands of Jewish thought in which he was formed. According to Porter, Hayes and Tombs, the Jewish tradition emphasizes a continued spiritual existence rather than a bodily resurrection.

Nevertheless, the origin of this idea is commonly traced to Jewish beliefs, a view against which Stanley E. Porter objected. According to Porter, Jewish and subsequent Christian thought were influenced by Greek thoughts, where "assumptions regarding resurrection" can be found, which were probably adopted by Paul. (Note: Porter, Hayes and Tombs: "Stanley Porter's paper brings together a body of literature, hitherto largely neglected, which highlights the fact that the Greeks, contrary to much scholarly opinion, did have a significant tradition of bodily resurrection, and that the Jewish tradition emphasizes a continued spiritual existence rather than a bodily resurrection. Thus, Paul in the New Testament probably adopted Graeco-Roman assumptions regarding the resurrection, although he was not blindly derivative in developing his conceptual framework.") According to Ehrman, most of the alleged parallels between Jesus and the pagan savior-gods only exist in the modern imagination, and there are no "accounts of others who were born to virgin mothers and who died as an atonement for sin and then were raised from the dead."

==== Exaltation and deification ====
According to Ehrman, a central question in the research on Jesus and early Christianity is how a human came to be deified in a relatively short time. Jewish Christians like the Ebionites had an Adoptionist Christology and regarded Jesus as the Messiah while rejecting his divinity, while other strands of Christian thought regard Jesus to be a "fully divine figure", a "high Christology". How soon the earthly Jesus was regarded to be the incarnation of God is a matter of scholarly debate.

Philippians 2: 5–11 contains the Christ hymn, which portrays Jesus as an incarnated and subsequently exalted heavenly being:

5 Have this mind in you, which was also in Christ Jesus:

6 who, existing in the form of God, counted not the being on an equality with God a thing to be grasped,
7 but emptied himself, taking the form of a servant, being made in the likeness of men;
8 and being found in fashion as a man, he humbled himself, becoming obedient [even] unto death, yea, the death of the cross.
9 Wherefore also God highly exalted him, and gave unto him the name which is above every name;
10 that in the name of Jesus every knee should bow, of [things] in heaven and [things] on earth and [things] under the earth,

11 and that every tongue should confess that Jesus Christ is Lord, to the glory of God the Father.

According to Dunn, the background of this hymn has been strongly debated. Some see it as influenced by a Greek worldview (Note: Several authors have even argued for influences from a "pre-Christian Gnostic redeemer myth". According to Dunn, this interpretation is dated, and based on "a most questionable historical foundation".) while others have argued for Jewish influences. According to Dunn, the hymn contains a contrast with the sins of Adam and his disobedience. Dunn further notes that the hymn may be seen as a three-stage Christology, starting with "an earlier stage of mythic pre-history or pre-existence," but regards the humility-exaltation contrast to be the main theme.

This belief in the incarnated and exalted Christ was part of Christian tradition a few years after his death and over a decade before the writing of the Pauline epistles.

According to Burton L. Mack the early Christian communities started with "Jesus movements", new religious movements centering on a human teacher called Jesus. A number of these "Jesus movements" can be discerned in early Christian writings. According to Mack, within these Jesus-movements developed within 25 years the belief that Jesus was the Messiah, and had risen from death.

According to Erhman, the gospels show a development from a "low Christology" towards a "high Christology". Yet, a "high Christology" seems to have been part of Christian traditions a few years after his death, and over a decade before the writing of the Pauline epistles, which are the oldest Christian writings. According to Martin Hengel, as summarized by Jeremy Bouma, the letters of Paul already contain a fully developed Christology, shortly after the death of Jesus, including references to his pre-existence. According to Hengel, the Gospel of John shows a development which builds on this early high Christology, fusing it with Jewish wisdom traditions, in which Wisdom was personified and descended into the world. While this "Logos Christology" is recognizable for Greek metaphysics, it is nevertheless not derived from pagan sources, and Hengel rejects the idea of influence from "Hellenistic mystery cults or a Gnostic redeemer myth".

According to Margaret Baker, Christian trinitarian theology derived from pre-Christian Judean beliefs about angels. These beliefs revolved around the idea that there was a High God and several Sons of God, one of which was Yahweh. Yahweh was believed to manifest as an angel, human being or a Davidic king, which led some 1st century Jews to believe that Jesus was the Son of God, Messiah and Lord.

== Paul and the inclusion of gentiles ==
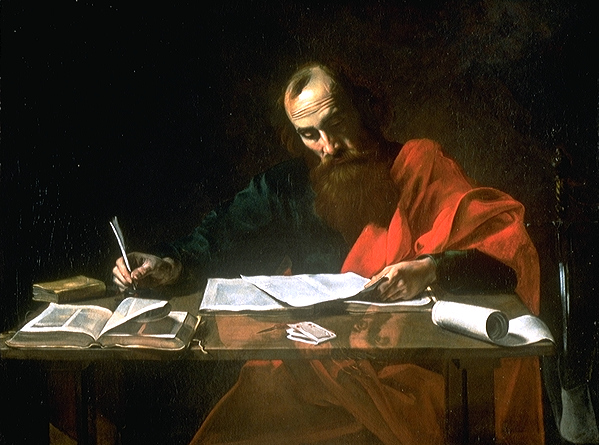
Valentin de Boulogne's depiction of Saint Paul Writing His Epistles, c. 1618-1620 (Blaffer Foundation Collection, Houston, Texas)

=== Saul of Tarsus (Paul the Apostle) ===
According to Larry Hurtado, "the christology and devotional stance that Paul affirmed (and shared with others in the early Jesus-movement) was... a distinctive expression within a variegated body of Jewish messianic hopes." According to Dunn, Paul presents, in his epistles, a Hellenised Christianity. (Note: The term "Pauline Christianity" is generally considered a pejorative by mainstream Christianity, as it carries the implication that Christianity is a corruption of the original teachings of Jesus, as for example in the belief of a Great Apostasy as found in Restorationism. Most of orthodox Christianity relies heavily on these teachings and considers them to be amplifications and explanations of the teachings of Jesus.) According to Ehrman, "Paul's message, in a nutshell, was a Jewish apocalyptic proclamation with a seriously Christian twist." Paul was in contact with the early Christian community in Jerusalem, led by James the Just. (Note: According to Mack, he may have been converted to another early strand of Christianity, with a High Christology.) Fragments of their beliefs in an exalted and deified Jesus, what Mack called the "Christ cult," can be found in the writings of Paul. (Note: According to Mack, "Paul was converted to a Hellenized form of some Jesus movement that had already developed into a Christ cult. [...] Thus his letters serve as documentation for the Christ cult as well." Price (2000), p. 75, §. The Christ Cults comments: "By choosing the terminology "Christ cults," Burton Mack means to differentiate those early movements that revered Jesus as the Christ from those that did not. [...] Mack is perhaps not quite clear about what would constitute a Christ cult. Or at least he seems to me to obscure some important distinctions between what would appear to be significantly different subtypes of Christ movements.") According to the New Testament, Saul of Tarsus first persecuted the early Jewish Christians, but then converted. (Note: Galatians 1:13. According to Dunn, Paul persecuted the "Hellenists" of Acts 6. According to Larry Hurtado, there was no theological divide between "Hellenists" (Greek speaking Jews from the diaspora who had returned to Jerusalem) and their fellow Jesus-followers; Paul's persecution was directed against the Jesus-movement in general, because it offended his Pharisaic convictions.) He adopted the name Paul and started proselytizing among the gentiles, adopting the title "Apostle to the Gentiles". Saint Peter, Paul and other Jewish Christians told the Jerusalem council that Gentiles were receiving the Holy Spirit, and so convinced the leaders of the Jerusalem Church to allow gentile converts exemption from most Jewish commandments at the Council of Jerusalem, which opened the way for a much larger Christian Church, extending far beyond the Jewish community.

While Paul was inspired by the early Christian apostles, his writings elaborate on their teachings, and also give interpretations which are different from other teachings as documented in the canonical gospels, early Acts and the rest of the New Testament, such as the Epistle of James.

=== Inclusion of gentiles ===
Some early Jewish Christians believed that non-Jews must convert to Judaism and adopt Jewish customs in order to be saved. Paul criticized Peter for himself declining to eat with gentiles during a visit by some of these Christians and therefore presenting a poor example to non-Jews joining the Christians. Paul's close coworker Barnabas sided with Peter in this dispute. Those that taught that gentile converts to Christianity ought to adopt more Jewish practices to be saved, however, were called "Judaizers". Though the Apostle Peter was initially sympathetic, the Apostle Paul opposed the teaching at the Incident at Antioch (Gal. 2:11–21) and at the Council of Jerusalem (Acts 15:6–35). Nevertheless, Judaizing continued to be encouraged for several centuries, particularly by Jewish Christians.

Paul opposed the strict applications of Jewish customs for gentile converts, and argued with the leaders of the Jerusalem Church to allow gentile converts exemption from most Jewish commandments at the Council of Jerusalem, where Paul met with the "pillars of Jerusalem Church" (whom Paul identifies as Peter, Jesus's brother James, and John) over whether gentile Christians need to keep the Jewish Law and be circumcised. According to Acts, James played a prominent role in the formulation of the council's decision (Acts 15:19 NRSV) that circumcision was not a requirement. In Galatians, Paul says that James, Peter and John will minister to the "circumcised" (in general Jews and Jewish proselytes) in Jerusalem, while Paul and his fellows will minister to the "uncircumcised" (in general, gentiles) (Galatians 2:9). (Note: These terms (circumcised/uncircumcised) are generally interpreted to mean Jews and Greeks, who were predominant; however, this is an oversimplification, as 1st-century Judaea Province also had some Jews who no longer circumcised and some Greeks and others such as Egyptians, Ethiopians, and Arabs who did.)

The Catholic Encyclopedia claims: "St. Paul's account of the incident leaves no doubt that St. Peter saw the justice of the rebuke." However, L. Michael White's From Jesus to Christianity claims: "The blowup with Peter was a total failure of political bravado, and Paul soon left Antioch as persona non grata, never again to return." Scholar James D. G. Dunn, who coined the phrase "New Perspective on Paul", has proposed that Peter was the "bridge-man" (i.e., the pontifex maximus) between the two other "prominent leading figures" of early Christianity: Paul and James, the brother of Jesus.

=== Hellenistic influences ===
Talmud scholar Daniel Boyarin has argued that Paul's theology of the spirit is more deeply rooted in Hellenistic Judaism than generally believed. In A Radical Jew, Boyarin argues that the Apostle Paul combined the life of Jesus with Greek philosophy to reinterpret the Hebrew Bible in terms of the Platonic opposition between the ideal (which is real) and the material (which is false). Judaism is a material religion, in which membership is based not on belief but rather descent from Abraham, physically marked by circumcision, and focusing on how to live this life properly. Paul saw in the symbol of a resurrected Jesus the possibility of a spiritual rather than corporeal Messiah. He used this notion of Messiah to argue for a religion through which all people—not just descendants of Abraham—could worship the God of Abraham. Unlike Judaism, which holds that it is the proper religion only of the Jews, Pauline Christianity claimed to be the proper religion for all people.

By appealing to the Platonic distinction between the material and the ideal, Paul showed how the spirit of Christ could provide all people a way to worship the God who had previously been worshipped only by Jews, Jewish proselytes and God-fearers, although Jews claimed that he was the one and only God of all. Boyarin roots Paul's work in Hellenistic Judaism and insists that Paul was thoroughly Jewish, but argues that Pauline theology made his version of Christianity appealing to gentiles. Boyarin also sees this Platonic reworking of both Jesus's teachings and Pharisaic Judaism as essential to the emergence of Christianity as a distinct religion, because it justified a Judaism without Jewish law.

== Split of early Christianity and Judaism ==
=== Emergence as separate religious communities ===
As Christianity grew throughout the gentile world, the developing Christian tradition diverged from its Jewish and Jerusalemite roots. Historians continue to debate the precise moment when early Christianity established itself as a new religion, apart and distinct from Judaism. It is difficult to trace the process by which the two separated or to know exactly when this began. Jewish Christians continued to worship in synagogues together with fellow Jews for centuries. Some scholars have found evidence of continuous interactions between Jewish-Christian and Rabbinic movements from the mid-to late second century CE to the fourth century CE. Philip S. Alexander characterizes the question of when Christianity and Judaism parted company and went their separate ways as "one of those deceptively simple questions which should be approached with great care". The first centuries of belief in Jesus were characterized by great uncertainty and religious creativity. "Groups of believers coalesced into proto-factions of like-minded individuals, and then into factions. [...] The degree of doctrinal cohesion of these groups is unknown. As attested by the extant texts, confusion and chaos were rampant." At first, early belief in Jesus was very much a local phenomenon with some degree of coordination among communities on a regional basis.

Both Early Christianity and Early Rabbinic Judaism were far less orthodox and less theologically homogeneous than in modern day. Both religions were significantly influenced by Hellenistic religion and borrowed allegories and concepts from Classical Hellenistic philosophy and the works of the Greek-speaking Jewish authors of the end of the Second Temple period. The two schools of thought eventually firmed up their respective "norms" and doctrines, notably by increasingly diverging on key issues such as the status of "purity laws", the validity of Judeo-Christian messianic beliefs, and, more importantly, the use of Koine Greek and Latin as sacerdotal languages replacing Biblical Hebrew.

=== Trajectory ===
Heinrich Graetz postulated a Council of Jamnia in 90 that excluded Christians from the synagogues, but this is disputed. Jewish Christians continued to worship in synagogues for centuries.

According to historian Shaye J. D. Cohen, "the separation of Christianity from Judaism was a process, not an event", in which the church became "more and more gentile, and less and less Jewish". (Note: Cohen 1987, p. 228: "The separation of Christianity from Judaism was a process, not an event. The essential part of this process was that the church was becoming more and more gentile, and less and less Jewish, but the separation manifested itself in different ways in each local community where Jews and Christians dwelt together. In some places, the Jews expelled the Christians; in other, the Christians left of their own accord.") According to Cohen, early Christianity ceased to be a Jewish sect when it ceased to observe Jewish practices, such as circumcision. According to Cohen, this process ended in 70 AD, after the great revolt, when various Jewish sects disappeared, and Pharisaic Judaism evolved into Rabbinic Judaism, and Christianity emerged as a distinct religion.

Talmudist and professor of Jewish studies Daniel Boyarin proposes a revised understanding of the interactions between nascent Christianity and Judaism in late antiquity, viewing the two "new" religions as intensely and complexly intertwined throughout this period. According to Boyarin, Judaism and Christianity "were part of one complex religious family, twins in a womb", for at least three centuries. (Note: Boyarin 1999: "for at least the first three centuries of their common lives, Judaism in all of its forms and Christianity in all of its forms were part of one complex religious family, twins in a womb, contending with each other for identity and precedence, but sharing with each other the same spiritual food.") Alan Segal also states that "one can speak of a 'twin birth' of two new Judaisms, both markedly different from the religious systems that preceded them". (Note: Segal 1986: "one can speak of a 'twin birth' of two new Judaisms, both markedly different from the religious systems that preceded them. Not only were Rabbinic Judaism and Christianity religious twins, but, like Jacob and Esau, the twin sons of Isaac and Rebecca, they fought in the womb, setting the stage for life after the womb.")

According to Robert Goldenberg, it is increasingly accepted among scholars that "at the end of the 1st century AD there were not yet two separate religions called 'Judaism' and 'Christianity'". (Note: Boyarin (1999, p. 15) adds that "without the power of the orthodox Church and the rabbis to declare people heretics and outside the system it remained impossible to declare phenomenologically who was a Jew and who was a Christian. At least as interesting and significant, it seems more and more clear that it is frequently impossible to tell a Jewish text from a Christian text. The borders are fuzzy, and this has consequences. Religious ideas and innovations can cross the borders in both directions.")

Jewish Christianity fell into decline during the Jewish–Roman wars (66–135) and the growing anti-Judaism perhaps best personified by Marcion of Sinope (c. 150). With persecution by the Nicene Christians from the time of the Roman Emperor Constantine in the 4th century, Jewish Christians sought refuge outside the boundaries of the Empire, in Arabia and further afield. Within the Empire and later elsewhere it was dominated by the gentile-based Christianity which became the State church of the Roman Empire and which took control of sites in the Holy Land such as the Church of the Holy Sepulchre and the Cenacle and appointed subsequent Bishops of Jerusalem.

=== First Jewish–Roman War and the destruction of the Temple ===
Full-scale, open revolt against the Romans occurred with the First Jewish–Roman War in 66 AD. In 70 AD, Jerusalem was besieged and the Second Temple was destroyed. This event was a profoundly traumatic experience for the Jews, who were now confronted with difficult and far-reaching questions. (Note: Such as: How to achieve atonement without the Temple?; How to explain the disastrous outcome of the rebellion?; How to live in the post-Temple, Romanized world?; How to connect present and past traditions?; How people answered these questioned depended largely on their position prior to the revolt.) After the destruction of the Second Temple in 70 AD, sectarianism largely came to an end. The Zealots, Sadducees, and Essenes disappeared, while the Early Christians and the Pharisees survived, the latter transforming into Rabbinic Judaism, today known simply as "Judaism". The term "Pharisee" was no longer used, perhaps because it was a term more often used by non-Pharisees, but also because the term was explicitly sectarian, and the rabbis claimed leadership over all Jews.

Many historians argue that the gospels took their final form after the Great Revolt and the destruction of the Temple, although some scholars put the authorship of Mark in the 60s. Strack theorizes that the growth of a Christian canon (the New Testament) was a factor that influenced the rabbis to record the oral law in writing. (Note: The theory that the destruction of the Temple and subsequent upheaval led to the committing of Oral Law into writing was first explained in the Epistle of Sherira Gaon and often repeated. See, for example, Grayzel, A History of the Jews, Penguin Books, 1984, p. 193.)

A significant contributing factor to the split was the two groups' differing theological interpretations of the Temple's destruction. Rabbinic Judaism saw the destruction as a chastisement for neglecting the Torah. The early Christians, however, saw it as God's punishment for the Jewish rejection of Jesus, leading to the claim that the 'true' Israel was now the Church. Jews believed this claim was scandalous. According to Fredriksen, since early Christians believed that Jesus had already replaced the Temple as the expression of a new covenant, they were relatively unconcerned with the destruction of the Temple during the First Jewish-Roman War.

=== Growing anti-Jewish sentiment in Christian writings ===
Growing anti-Jewish sentiment among early Christians is evidenced by the Epistle of Barnabas, a late-1st/early-2nd century letter attributed to Barnabas, the companion of Paul mentioned in the Acts of the Apostles, although it could be by Barnabas of Alexandria, or an anonymous author using the name Barnabas. In no other writing of that early time is the separation of the gentile Christians from observant Jews so clearly insisted upon. Christians, according to Barnabas, are the only true covenant people, and the Jewish people are no longer in covenant with God. Circumcision and the entire Jewish sacrificial and ceremonial system have been abolished in favor of "the new law of our Lord Jesus Christ". Barnabas claims that Jewish scriptures, rightly understood, serve as a foretelling of Christ and its laws often contain allegorical meanings.

While 2nd-century Marcionism rejected all Jewish influence on Christianity, Proto-orthodox Christianity instead retained some of the doctrines and practices of 1st-century Judaism while rejecting others. (Note: See the Historical background to the issue of Biblical law in Christianity and Early Christianity.) They held the Jewish scriptures to be authoritative and sacred, employing mostly the Septuagint or Targum translations, and adding other texts as the New Testament canon developed. Christian baptism was another continuation of a Judaic practice.

=== Rejection of Jewish Christianity ===
In Christian circles, the term "Nazarene" later came to be used as a label for those Christians who were faithful to Jewish law; in particular, it was used as a label for a certain sect of Christians. At first, these Jewish Christians, originally the central group in Christianity, were not declared unorthodox but they were later excluded from the Jewish community and denounced. Some Jewish Christian groups, such as the Ebionites, were accused of having unorthodox beliefs, particularly in relation to their views of Christ and gentile converts. The Nazarenes, who held to orthodoxy but adhered to Jewish law, were not deemed heretical until the dominance of orthodoxy in the 4th century. The Ebionites may have been a splinter group of Nazarenes, with disagreements over Christology and leadership. After the condemnation of the Nazarenes, the term "Ebionite" was often used as a general pejorative for all related "heresies".

Jewish Christians constituted a community which was separate from the Pauline Christians. There was a post-Nicene "double rejection" of the Jewish Christians by adherents of gentile Christianity and Rabbinic Judaism. It is believed that no direct confrontation occurred between the adherents of gentile Christianity and the adherents of Judaic Christianity. However, by this time, the practice of Judeo-Christianity was diluted by internal schisms and external pressures. Gentile Christianity remained the sole strand of orthodoxy and it imposed itself on the previously Jewish Christian sanctuaries, taking full control of those houses of worship by the end of the 5th century.

Justin Martyr in the Dialogue with Trypho, distinguishes between Jewish Christians who observe the Law of Moses but do not require its observance upon others, and those who believe the Mosaic Law to be obligatory on all.

== Later Jewish Christianity ==
=== Antiquity ===
==== Ebionites ====
The Ebionites were a Jewish Christian movement that existed during the early centuries of the Christian Era. They show strong similarities with the earliest form of Jewish Christianity, and their specific theology may have been a "reaction to the law-free Gentile mission." They regarded Jesus as the Messiah while rejecting his divinity and his virgin birth, and insisted on the necessity of following Jewish law and rites. Most Church Fathers characterize Ebionites as holding a functional adoptionist Christology that rejects the belief that Jesus was a divine person (God the Son) at any stage of his earthly life, whether before (pre-existence), during (incarnation), or after it (exaltation), and instead presents him as a righteous human being who, through faithful observance of the Law of Moses, was adopted by God at his baptism to fulfill the role of prophet and Jewish Messiah, along with being the final sacrifice for all sins by dying on the cross and resurrecting. They used the Gospel of the Ebionites, one of the Jewish–Christian gospels or the Gospel of Matthew starting at chapter 3 as their principal scriptural authority; revered James the brother of Jesus (James the Just); and rejected Paul the Apostle as an apostate from the Law. Their name (Ancient Greek: Ἐβιωναῖοι Ebionaioi, derived from Hebrew אביונים ebyonim, ebionim, meaning "the poor" or "poor ones") suggests that they placed a special value on voluntary poverty.

Distinctive features of the Gospel of the Ebionites include the absence of the virgin birth and of the genealogy of Jesus; an Adoptionist Christology, in which Jesus is chosen to be God's Son at the time of his Baptism; the abolition of the Jewish sacrifices by Jesus; and an advocacy of vegetarianism.

==== Nazarenes ====
The Nazarenes originated as a sect of first-century Judaism. The first use of the term "sect of the Nazarenes" is in the Book of Acts in the New Testament, where Paul is accused of being a ringleader of the sect of the Nazarenes ("πρωτοστάτην τε τῆς τῶν Ναζωραίων αἱρέσεως"). (Note: Acts 24:5 "For we have found this man a pestilent fellow, and a mover of sedition among all the Jews throughout the world, and a ringleader of the sect of the Nazarenes.") The term then simply designated followers of "Yeshua Natzri" (Jesus the Nazarene), (Note: As the Hebrew term נוֹצְרִי (nôṣrî) still does.) but in the first to fourth centuries the term was used for a sect of followers of Jesus who were closer to Judaism than most Christians. They are described by Epiphanius of Salamis and are mentioned later by Jerome and Augustine of Hippo, who made a distinction between the Nazarenes of their time and the "Nazarenes" mentioned in Acts 24:5.

The Nazarenes were similar to the Ebionites, in that they considered themselves Jews, maintained an adherence to the Law of Moses, but they considered as their holy scriptures: the Hebrew Bible and the New Testament, which included the Gospel of Matthew in Hebrew or Aramaic, believed that Jesus was the Christ, born of a virgin, suffered and resurrected again under Pontius Pilate, believed in the resurrection of the dead, and accepted Paul's mission to the gentiles. Unlike half of the Ebionites, they accepted the Virgin Birth.

The Gospel of the Hebrews was a syncretic Jewish–Christian gospel, the text of which is lost; only fragments of it survive as brief quotations by the early Church Fathers and in apocryphal writings. The fragments contain traditions of Jesus' pre-existence, incarnation, baptism, and probable temptation, along with some of his sayings. Distinctive features include a Christology characterized by the belief that the Holy Spirit is Jesus' Divine Mother; and a first resurrection appearance to James, the brother of Jesus, showing a high regard for James as the leader of the Jewish Christian church in Jerusalem. It was probably composed in Greek in the first decades of the 2nd century, and is believed to have been used by Greek-speaking Jewish Christians in Egypt during that century.

The Gospel of the Nazarenes is the title given to fragments of one of the lost Jewish-Christian Gospels of Matthew partially reconstructed from the writings of Jerome.

==== Elcesaites ====
The Elcesaites (also spelled Elkesaites or Elchasaites) were a Jewish-Christian sect that emerged in the early 2nd century CE, primarily in the region of Syria or Mesopotamia. The group is named after its founder, Elchasai (or Elxai), a prophet who claimed to have received a revelation from a heavenly book delivered by an angel of enormous size. The teachings of the Elcesaites are known mostly through the writings of early Church Fathers, particularly Hippolytus of Rome, Origen, and Epiphanius of Salamis.

The Elcesaites combined elements of Jewish law, early Christianity, Gnosticism, and apocalyptic thought. They emphasized strict observance of the Mosaic Law, including circumcision, ritual purity, and sabbath keeping, while also promoting baptism as a means of forgiveness and spiritual cleansing. The sect believed in repeated baptisms for the remission of sins and rejected certain parts of Pauline Christianity, particularly doctrines about the divinity of Christ and the abolition of the Law.

One of the distinctive aspects of Elcesaite belief was their rejection of animal sacrifice and their focus on angelic intermediaries. They also held to a unique cosmology, including a belief in giant angelic beings and a dualistic view of the cosmos. Their sacred book was said to have originated during the reign of the Roman emperor Trajan (98–117 CE).

The Elcesaites had an influence on later sects such as the Ebionites and possibly on early Islamic thought. By the 4th century, references to the Elcesaites become increasingly rare, suggesting that the movement had either declined or merged with other religious groups.

==== Cerinthians ====
The Cerinthians were a Christian sect in the late 1st and early 2nd centuries CE, associated with the teachings of Cerinthus, a Jewish-Christian teacher who lived in Asia Minor, possibly in Ephesus. Most of what is known about Cerinthus and his followers comes from early Church Fathers such as Irenaeus, Hippolytus, and Epiphanius, as well as from critical remarks attributed to the Apostle John.

Cerinthus taught a form of Christian Gnosticism that emphasized a strict adherence to Jewish law while introducing speculative theological concepts. He distinguished between Jesus the man and the divine "Christ," asserting that the Christ descended upon Jesus at his baptism and departed before the crucifixion and that Jesus suffered and resurrected while "Christ" remained a spiritual being.

According to Irenaeus, Cerinthus believed in a materialistic view of the Kingdom of God, teaching that after the resurrection, there would be a thousand-year reign of Christ on Earth filled with physical pleasures, such as eating, drinking, and marriage. This millenarian doctrine was controversial and rejected by many early Church leaders.

Cerinthus also rejected the idea that the supreme God had created the world, teaching instead that the world was made by a lesser, ignorant power (a common theme in Gnostic cosmology). His views placed him at odds with both orthodox Christians and more developed Gnostic sects.

While the Cerinthians did not become a lasting or widely influential movement, their teachings reflect the diversity and theological debates present in early Christianity. The opposition to Cerinthus by figures such as John the Apostle—who, according to tradition, once fled a bathhouse upon learning Cerinthus was inside—highlights the intensity of early doctrinal disputes.

==== Saint Thomas Christians ====
The Saint Thomas Christians of Kerala, known locally as Nasranis or Nazarenes, have long been associated with Jewish and Hebrew origins. This nomenclature was historically used to describe early Jewish Christians, suggesting that the Nasrani community have roots in Jewish communities of the Near East. Apostle Thomas, during his missionary endeavors, preached to dispersed Israelite communities in India, aligning with patterns observed in other apostles' missions. Dr. Ray A Pritz, in his thesis Nazarene Jewish Christianity mentions that "Christian" (followers of Christ) was originally used by the non-christians to designate believers among the Gentiles while the Nazarenes was already used in Israel to describe Jewish adherents to the new Messianic sect. Further supporting this hypothesis are cultural and linguistic parallels between the Nasranis and Jewish communities in Kerala, such as shared traditions and place names with Hebrew connotations. Also the fact that they enjoyed elite and commercial rights by the Chera king could've been possible since they share with the jews having received the royal charter engraved on copper plates from Cheraman Perumal would be only possible if they were ethnically jews because lower caste converts didn't have this privilege. They had the rights to sit before kings, ride horses, elephants, chariots and wear headgears just like the brahmins.They were also given lordship over seventeen underprivileged castes. They also practiced and till today practices strict endogamy among themselves, also conversions are discouraged in the non-Catholic traditional Syrian Christian denomination. Even catholic nazranis do not let converts or non nazarenes to participate or involve in their practices and customs and are given separate dioceses/parishes. Until the arrival of the Portuguese they had strict dietary customs, and observed Jewish holidays such as passover and yom kippur.Till today Pesaha is observed and unleavened bread similar to a matzah is prepared in every Syrian Christian household on Maundy Thursday.In fact Y-DNA genetic signatures have been reported which indicate clear Cohen (Aaronic) ancestry, Levite ancestry and Judahite ancestry. The brahmin origin of these Christians are merely namesake which was the term used to denote priests in the Indian languages then is another claim. It is also a fact that the Apostle Thomas came in search for the jews in India first to preach the gospel.

The Knanaya of India descend from Syriac Christians of Jewish origin who migrated to India from Mesopotamia between the 4th and 9th century under the leadership of the merchant Knai Thoma. In the modern age, they are another minority ethnic group found among the St. Thomas Christians. The culture of the Knanaya has been analyzed by a number of Jewish scholars who have noted that the community maintains striking correlations to Jewish communities, in particular the Cochin Jews of Kerala. The culture of the Knanaya is a blend of Jewish-Christian, Syriac, and Hindu customs reflecting both the foreign origin of the community and the centuries that they have lived as a minority community in India.

=== Surviving Byzantine and 'Syriac' communities in the Middle East ===
The unique combination of ethnocultural traits inhered from the fusion of a Greek cultural base, Hellenistic Judaism and Roman civilization gave birth to the distinctly Antiochian "Middle Eastern-Roman" Christian traditions of Cilicia (Southeastern Turkey) and Syria/Lebanon:

The mixture of Roman, Greek, and Jewish elements admirably adapted Antioch for the great part it played in the early history of Christianity. The city was the cradle of the church.

Members of these communities still call themselves Rûm which literally means "Eastern Roman", "Byzantine" or "Asian Greek" in Turkish, Persian and Arabic. The term "Rûm" is used in preference to "Ionani" or "Yāvāni" which means "European Greek" or "Ionian" in Classical Arabic and Ancient Hebrew.

Most Middle-Eastern "Melkites" or "Rûms", can trace their ethnocultural heritage to the Southern Anatolian ('Cilician') and Syrian Hellenized Greek-speaking Jewish communities of the past and Greek settlers ('Greco-Syrians'), founders of the original "Antiochian Greek" communities of Cilicia, Northwestern Syria and Lebanon. Counting members of the surviving minorities in the Hatay Province of Turkey, in Syria, Lebanon, Northern Israel and their relatives in the diaspora, there are more than 1.8 million Greco-Melkite Christians residing in the Northern-MENA, the US, Canada and Latin America today, i.e., Greek Orthodox and Greek Catholic Christians under the ancient jurisdictional authority of the patriarchates of Antioch and Jerusalem ("Orthodox" in the narrow sense) or their Uniat offshoots ("Catholic" or "united" with Rome).

== In Islamic origins ==
In the field of Quranic studies, it has long been argued that Jewish Christianity played an important role in the formation of Quranic conceptions of Christians in Muhammad's Arabia. The first major author to assert that Jewish Christianity played an important role in the formation of Quranic tradition was Aloys Sprenger in his 1861 book Das Leben und die Lehre des Moḥammad. Since then, numerous other authors have followed this argument, including Adolf von Harnack, Hans-Joachim Schoeps, M. P. Roncaglia, and others. The most recent notable defenders of this thesis have been Francois de Blois and Holger Zellentin, the latter in the context of his research into the historical context of the legal discourses present in the Quran especially as it resembles the Syriac recension of the Didascalia Apostolorum and the Clementine literature. In turn, several critics of this thesis have appeared, most notably Sidney Griffith. De Blois provides three arguments for the importance of Jewish Christianity: the use of the term naṣārā in the Quran (usually taken as a reference to Christians, as in Griffith's work) which resembles the Syriac term used for Nazoreans, the resemblance between the description of Mary as part of the Trinity with traditions attributed to the Gospel of the Hebrews, and dietary restrictions associated with the Christian community. In turn, Shaddel argued that naṣārā merely may have etymologically originated as such because Nazoreans were the first to interact with the Arabic community in which this term came into use. Alternative sources as well as hyperbole may explain the reference to Mary in the Trinity. However, Shaddel does admit the ritual laws as evidence for the relevance of Jewish Christians. In the last few years, the thesis for the specific role played by Jewish Christians has been resisted by Gabriel Said Reynolds, Stephen Shoemaker, and Guillaume Dye.

== Contemporary movements ==
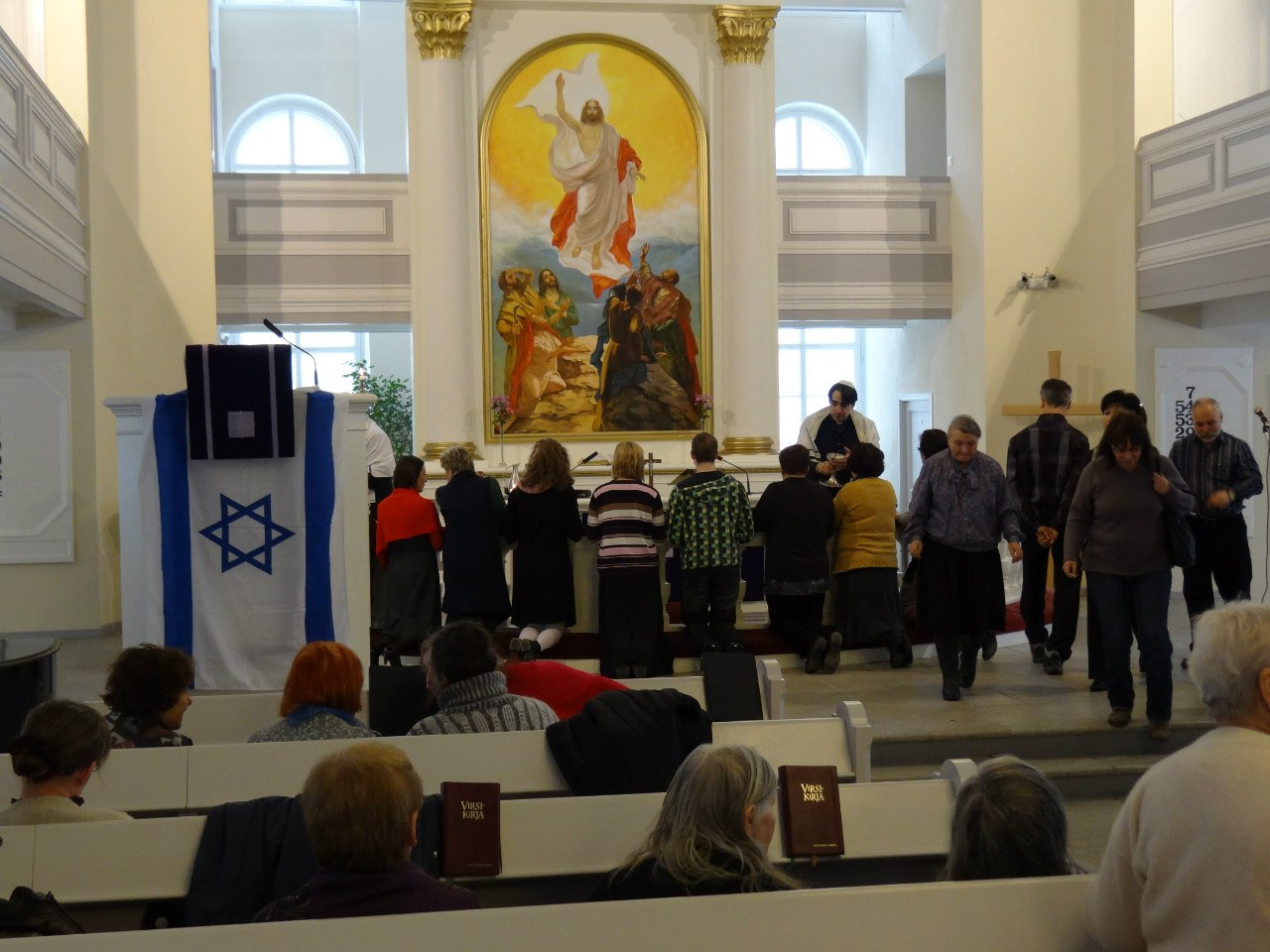
Purim of Messianic Jews, Saint Petersburg

In modern times, the term "Jewish Christian" or "Christian Jew" is generally used in reference to ethnic Jews who have either converted to or been raised in Christianity. They are mostly members of Catholic, Protestant and Orthodox Christian congregations, and they are generally assimilated into the Christian mainstream, but they may also retain a strong sense of attachment to their Jewish identity. Some Jewish Christians also refer to themselves as "Hebrew Christians".

The Hebrew Christian movement of the 19th century was an initiative which was largely led and integrated by Anglicans, and they included figures such as Michael Solomon Alexander, Bishop of Jerusalem 1842–1845; some figures, such as Joseph Frey, the founder of the London Society for Promoting Christianity amongst the Jews, were more assertive of their Jewish identity and independence.

The 19th century saw at least 250,000 Jews convert to Christianity according to existing records of various societies. According to data from the Jewish Encyclopedia, around 204,542 Jews converted to Christianity during the nineteenth century. The largest number joined the Eastern Orthodox Church, at about 74,500 converts, followed by Protestantism with approximately 72,742, and the Roman Catholic Church with around 57,300.

According to data which was provided by the Pew Research Center, as of 2013, about 1.6 million adult American Jews identify themselves as Christians, and most of them identify themselves as Protestants. According to the same data, most of the Jews who identify themselves as some sort of Christian (1.6 million) were either raised as Jews or are Jews by ancestry. According to a 2020 study by the Pew Research Center, 19% of those who say they were raised Jewish, consider themselves Christian. According to a 2012 study, 17% of Jews in Russia identify themselves as Christians.

Messianic Judaism is a religious movement which incorporates elements of Judaism with the tenets of Christianity. Its adherents, many of whom are ethnically Jewish, worship in congregations which recite Hebrew prayers. They also baptize messianic believers who are of the age of accountability (able to accept Jesus as the Messiah), often observe kosher dietary laws and keep Saturday as the Sabbath. Additionally, they recognize the Christian New Testament as holy scripture, though most of them do not use the label "Christian" to describe themselves.

The two groups are not completely distinct; some adherents, for example, favor Messianic congregations but they freely choose to live in both worlds, such as the theologian Arnold Fruchtenbaum, the founder of Ariel Ministries.

The Hebrew Catholics are a movement of Jews who converted to Catholicism and Catholics of non-Jewish origin who choose to keep Jewish customs and traditions in light of Catholic doctrine.

== See also ==
- Anti-Judaism
- Antisemitism in Christianity, a form of religious antisemitism
- Anti-Zionism, opposition to Zionism
- Christianity and Hellenistic philosophy
- Christianity and Judaism
- Christianity in Israel
- Christianity in the Middle East
- Christian–Jewish reconciliation
- Christian observances of Jewish holidays
- Christian Torah-submission
- Christian views on the Old Covenant
- Christian Zionism
- Church's Ministry Among Jewish People
- Church of Zion, Jerusalem
- Conversion of the Jews
- Adventism
- Biblical criticism
- Criticism of the Bible
- Criticism of Christianity
- Criticism of Judaism
- Dispensationalism
- Hebrew Catholics
- Hebrew Christian movement
- Hebrew Roots – A religious movement which accepts both the Old and New Testaments but rejects the Talmud and many Jewish traditions which are not supported by Scripture.
- Hellenistic Judaism
- Higher criticism
- Historicity of the Bible
- History of the Catholic Church
- History of Christianity
- History of Judaism
- History of Zionism
- Jesus in the Talmud
- Jesuism
- Jewish history
- Jewish religious movements
- Jewish schisms
- Jews for Jesus
- Judaism's view of Jesus
- Judaizers
- Judeo-Christian
- Life of Jesus
- Mandaeans
- Messianic Judaism
- Nazarene (sect)
- Noahidism
- People of the Book
- Philo-Semitism
- Religious perspectives on Jesus
- Restoration Movement
- Sabbatarianism
- Saint Thomas Christians
- Sacred Name Movement
- Synagogal Judaism
- Therapeutae
- Timeline of antisemitism
- Timeline of anti-Zionism
- Timeline of the Catholic Church
- Timeline of Christianity
- Timeline of Christian missions
- Timeline of Jewish history

== Bibliography ==
- Blomberg, Craig L. (2007) [1987]. The historical reliability of the gospels (2nd ed.). InterVarsity Press. ISBN 978-0-8308-2807-4.
- Bockmuehl, Markus N. A. (2010). The Remembered Peter: In Ancient Reception and Modern Debate. Mohr Siebeck.
- Cameron, Ron (1992). "Hebrews, Gospel of the". In Freedman, David Noel (ed.). The Anchor Bible Dictionary. Vol. 3 (1 ed.). Doubleday. pp. 105–6. ISBN 978-0-385-42583-4.
- Casey, Maurice (2010). Jesus of Nazareth: An Independent Historian's Account of His Life and Teaching. New York and London: T & T Clark. ISBN 978-0-567-64517-3.
- Crone, Patricia (2015). "Jewish Christianity and the Qurʾān (Part One)". Journal of Near Eastern Studies. 74 (2): 225–253. doi:10.1086/682212. JSTOR 10.1086/682212.
- Cwiekowski, Frederick J. (1988). The Beginnings of the Church. Paulist Press.
- Cohen, Shaye J.D. (1987). From the Maccabees to the Mishnah. The Westminster Press. ISBN 0-664-25017-3.
- Dauphin, C. (1993), "De l'Église de la circoncision à l'Église de la gentilité – sur une nouvelle voie hors de l'impasse", Studium Biblicum Franciscanum. Liber Annuus XLIII, archived from the original on 2013-03-09
- Dunn, James D. G. (2006) [1977]. Unity and diversity in the New Testament: An inquiry into the character of earliest Christianity (3rd ed.). London: SCM Press. ISBN 978-0-334-02998-4. OCLC 64450678.
- Dye, Guillaume (2021). "Mapping the Sources of the Qur'anic Jesus". In Mortensen, Mette Bjerregaard; Dye, Guillaume; Oliver, Isaac W.; Tesei, Tommaso (eds.). The Study of Islamic Origins: New Perspectives and Contexts. De Gruyter.
- Eddy, Paul Rhodes; Boyd, Gregory A. (2007). The Jesus Legend: A Case for the Historical Reliability of the Synoptic Jesus Tradition. Baker Academic. ISBN 978-0-8010-3114-4.
- Ehrman, Bart (2005). Lost Christianities: The Battles for Scripture and the Faiths We Never Knew. Oxford University Press. ISBN 978-0-19-518249-1.
- Ehrman, Bart D. (2012). Did Jesus Exist?: The Historical Argument for Jesus of Nazareth. HarperOne. ISBN 978-0-06220644-2.
- Ehrman, Bart (2014). How Jesus became God: The Exaltation of a Jewish Preacher from Galilee. Harper Collins.
- Ehrman, Bart D. (2018). The Triumph of Christianity: How a Forbidden Religion Swept the World. Simon & Schuster. ISBN 1501136704.
- Ehrman, Bart D.; Evans, Craig A.; Stewart, Robert B. (2020). Can we trust the Bible on the Historical Jesus?. Westminster John Knox Press. ISBN 978-0-664-26585-4.
- Elwell, Walter; Comfort, Philip Wesley (2001). Tyndale Bible Dictionary. Tyndale House. ISBN 0-8423-7089-7.
- Esler, Philip F. (2004), The Early Christian World, Routledge, ISBN 0-415-33312-1
- Evans, Craig (1993). "Life-of-Jesus Research and the Eclipse of Mythology". Theological Studies. 54: 3–36. doi:10.1177/004056399305400102.
- Fredriksen, Paula (2000) [1988]. From Jesus to Christ: The origins of the new testament images of Christ (2nd ed.). Yale University Press. ISBN 978-0-300-08457-3.
- Gamliel, Ophira (April 2009). Jewish Malayalam Women's Songs (PDF) (PhD). Hebrew University. Archived from the original (PDF) on 26 March 2017.
- Grant, Robert McQueen (1963). "10: The Gospel of Luke and the Book of Acts". A Historical Introduction to the New Testament. Harper & Row. Archived from the original on 21 June 2010.
- Griffith, Sidney (2011). "Al-Naṣārā in the Qurʾān: A hermeneutical reflection". In Reynolds, Gabriel Said (ed.). New Perspectives on the Qur'an: The Qur'an in its Historical Context 2. Routledge. pp. 301–322.
- Jussay, P. M. (2005). The Jews of Kerala. Calicut: Publication division, University of Calicut.
- Kloppenborg, John S. (1994) [1992]. "The Gospel of the Ebionites". In Miller, Robert J. (ed.). The Complete Gospels. Polebridge Press. pp. 435–40. ISBN 0-06-065587-9.
- Koch, Glenn Alan (1990). "Hebrews, Gospel of the". In Mills, Watson E.; Bullard, Roger Aubrey (eds.). Mercer Dictionary of the Bible. Mercer University Press. p. 364. ISBN 978-0-86554-373-7.
- Lapham, Fred (2003). An Introduction to the New Testament Apocrypha. Continuum. ISBN 978-0-8264-6979-3.
- Leiva-Merikakis, E. (1996). Fire of Mercy, Heart of the Word: Chapters 12-18. Vol. 2. Ignatius Press. ISBN 978-0-89870-976-6.
- Leman, Johan (2015) [2014]. Van totem tot verrezen Heer. Een historisch-antropologisch verhaal (second ed.). Pelckmans.
- Lüdemann, Gerd; Özen, Alf (1996). De opstanding van Jezus. Een historische benadering (Was mit Jesus wirklich geschah. Die Auferstehung historisch betrachtet). The Have/Averbode.
- Maccoby, Hyam (1986). The Mythmaker. Paul and the Invention of Christianity. Barnes & Noble.
- Mack, Burton L. (1988). "The Congregations of the Christ". A Myth of Innocence: Mark and Christian Origins. Fortress Press. ISBN 978-0-8006-2549-8.
- Mack, Burton L. (1995). Who wrote the New Testament? The making of the Christian myth. Harper San Francisco. ISBN 978-0-06-065517-4.
- Mack, Burton L. (1997) [1995]. Wie schreven het Nieuwe Testament werkelijk? Feiten, mythen en motieven. Uitgeverij Ankh-Hermes.
- Novakovic, Lidija (2014), Raised from the Dead According to Scripture: The Role of the Old Testament in the Early Christian Interpretations of Jesus' Resurrection, A&C Black
- Pagels, Elaine (2005). De Gnostische Evangelien [The Gnostic Gospels]. Servire.
- Pao, David W. (2016). Acts and the Isaianic New Exodus. Wipf and Stock Publishers.
- Porter, Stanley E. (1999). "Resurrection, the Greeks and the New Testament". In Porter, Stanley E.; Hayes, Michael A.; Tombs, David (eds.). Resurrection. Sheffield Academic Press.
- Reynolds, Gabriel Said (2014). "On the Presentation of Christianity in the Qura'n and the Many Aspects of Qur'anic Rhetoric" (PDF). Al-Bayan Journal of Qur'an and Hadith Studies. 12 (1): 42–54. doi:10.1163/22321969-12340003.
- Reynolds, Gabriel Said (2019). "On the Qur'an and Christian heresies". The Qur'an's Reformation of Judaism and Christianity: Return to the Origins. Routledge.
- Price, Robert M. (2000). Deconstructing Jesus. Prometheus Books. ISBN 978-1-57392-758-1.
- Price, Robert M. (2003). The Incredible Shrinking Son of Man: How Reliable Is the Gospel Tradition?. Prometheus Books. ISBN 978-1-59102-121-6.
- Sanders, Ed Parish (1993). The historical figure of Jesus. London: Allen Lane. ISBN 978-0-7139-9059-1.
- Sanders, E. P. (1995). The Historical Figure of Jesus. London: Penguin. ISBN 978-0-14-192822-7.
- Shaddel, Mehdy (2016). "Qurʾānic ummī: Genealogy, Ethnicity, and the Foundation of a New Community". Jerusalem Studies in Arabic and Islam. 43: 1–60.
- Shoemaker, Stephen (2018). "Jewish Christianity, Non-Trinitarianism and the Beginnings of Islam". In Mimouni, Simon (ed.). Judaïsme ancien et origines du christianisme. Brepols. pp. 105–116.
- Stanton, Graham (2002) [1989]. The Gospels and Jesus. Oxford Bible Series (Second ed.). Oxford University Press. ISBN 0-19-924616-5.
- Strousma, Guy (2015). The Making of the Abrahamic Religions in Late Antiquity. Oxford University Press.
- Tabor, James D. (1998). "Ancient Judaism: Nazarenes and Ebionites". The Jewish Roman World of Jesus. Department of Religious Studies; University of North Carolina at Charlotte. Archived from the original on 2010-06-10..
- Vielhauer, Philipp; Strecker, Georg [in German] (1991). "Jewish–Christian gospels". In Schneemelcher, Wilhelm; Wilson, Robert McLachlan (eds.). New Testament Apocrypha: Gospels and Related Writings Volume 1. translated by George Ogg (2 ed.). John Knox Press. pp. 134–78. ISBN 0-664-22721-X. (6th German ed.)
- Vermes, Geza (2008). The Resurrection. Penguin Books.
- Weil, Shalva (1982). "Symmetry between Christians and Jews in India: The Cananite Christians and Cochin Jews in Kerala". Contributions to Indian Sociology. 16 (2): 175–96. doi:10.1177/006996678201600202. S2CID 143053857.
- Wright, Nicholas Thomas (2003). The resurrection of the son of God. Christian origins and the question of God. Vol. 3. Minneapolis: Fortress Press. ISBN 978-0-8006-2679-2. OCLC 52077589.
- Zellentin, Holger (2013). The Qur ͗ān's legal culture: the "Didascalia Apostolorum" as a point of departure. Mohr Siebeck.
