= Hebrew Christian movement =

1800s–1900s UK and US religious movement

The Hebrew Christian movement of the 19th and early 20th centuries consisted of Jews who converted to Christianity, but worshiped in congregations separate from denominational churches. In many cases, they retained some Jewish practices and liturgy, with the addition of readings from the Christian New Testament. The movement was incorporated into the parallel Messianic Jewish movement in the late 1960s.

== First century to Reformation ==
From Jewish Christian origins, through to the split of early Christianity and Judaism, to the development of Christianity in the 1st century, the Christian mission to Jews was first led by Jewish Christians, but later by the established (Gentile) churches, with Jewish converts sometimes proselytizing to their own people.

== Precursor movements ==
The general missionary movement awakening in the Protestant church during the latter 18th century and the early 19th century motivated many missionaries to proselytize to Jews in a more 'humane' manner. With societies in England, Scotland and Germany, missionaries went all over Europe and had some success, as Aaron Bernstein noted in a number of examples. The 19th century saw at least 250,000 Jews convert to Christianity according to existing records of various societies.

Beginning in the 19th century, some groups had attempted to create congregations and societies primarily of Jews who had converted to Christianity. The London Society for promoting Christianity amongst the Jews (currently known as "Church's Ministry Among Jewish People") was formed in 1809 with the motto "Jesus Christ is the Messiah." The list of supporters for the early Messianic Jewish movement included the Duke of Devonshire, seven English Earls, five viscounts and several members of the British Parliament, alongside social engineers such as William Wilberforce and Charles Simeon.

== Early congregations ==
The first identifiable congregation made up exclusively of Jews who had converted to Christianity was established in the United Kingdom in 1813. a group of 41 "Hebrew Christians" established an association called "Beni Abraham", and started meeting at Jews' Chapel in London for prayers Friday night and Sunday morning. In 1885, the first Hebrew Christian church was established in New York. In the 1890s, immigrant Jews who converted to Christianity established the "Hope of Israel" mission on New York's Lower East Side while retaining Jewish rites and customs. In 1895, Hope of Israel's Our Hope magazine carried the subtitle "A Monthly Devoted to the Study of Prophecy and to Messianic Judaism". Hope of Israel was controversial: other missionary groups accused its members of being Judaizers, and one of the two editors of Our Hope magazine, Arno C. Gaebelein, eventually repudiated his views, and, as a result, was able to become a leader in the mainstream Christian evangelical movement. In 1915, when the Hebrew Christian Alliance of America (HCAA) was founded, it "consistently assuaged the fears of fundamentalist Christians by emphasizing that it is not a separate denomination but only an evangelistic arm of the evangelical church", and insisted that it would be free of these Judaizing practices "now and forever". In the 1940s and 50s, missionaries in Israel adopted the term meshichyim ("Messianic") to counter negative connotations of the traditional word notzrim.

== Early organizations ==
- The American Society for Meliorating the Condition of the Jews was incorporated April 14, 1820, "to invite and receive, from any part of the world, such Jews as do already profess the Christian religion, or are desirous to receive Christian instruction, to form them into a settlement, and to furnish them with the ordinances of the gospel, and with such employment in the settlement as shall be assigned them; but no one shall be received, unless he comes well recommended for morals and industry, and without charge to this society." In 1855 scandalous reports affecting the character of its leader caused the suspension of all activity of that society, and it finally ceased to exist in 1867.
- The "Jewish Converts' Society" was formed in November 1823 for the purpose of mutual edification and the furtherance of gospel work among the Jews. In 1824, Gentile Christians began to be admitted to the society. Many of the members also joined the ASMCJ. In 1826, the leader was accused of heresy and the Jewish Converts' Society ceased to exist after a life of almost four years.
- Brotherhood of Jewish Proselytes was formed in 1844. Its founder was Silian Bonhomme, a French Jew, for many years the faithful traveling missionary of the ASMCJ, but he was restricted mostly to prayer meetings. In 1844 the brotherhood succumbed to attacks by the American Baptist Association for Evangelizing the Jews
- The American Baptist Association for Evangelizing the Jews was formed in December 1844 by S. H. Cone and Joseph Frey, at this point a zealous Baptist, who thought it his duty to counteract as much as possible the work of all non-Baptists. Both SBSEJ and a companion organization, the Brotherhood of Jewish Converts, created conflict with the ASMCJ resulting in the speedy decline and death of both brotherhoods.
- The Brownsville Mission to the Jews was formed in 1894 by Leopold Cohn, a Jewish immigrant who converted to Christianity. In 1924, the organization of Jews who had converted to Christianity changed its name to "American Board of Missions to the Jews". In 1984, the name was changed again to its current name, "Chosen People Ministries".

== Movement established ==
The Hebrew Christian Alliance was formed in Britain in 1860.

The Hebrew Christian Alliance of American (HCAA) was founded in 1915, in part to emphasize to fundamentalist Christians that while it used Jewish forms, it was a cooperating evangelistic arm of the evangelical church.

In 1975, the HCAA changed its name to the Messianic Jewish Alliance of America.

== See also ==
- Church's Ministry Among Jewish People
- Hebrew Catholics
- Hebrew Christian Alliance of Great Britain
- Jewish Christian
- Messianic Jewish Alliance of America
- Messianic Judaism
- Union of Messianic Jewish Congregations
