= Fellowship of Christian Testimonies to the Jews =

Christian organization

The Fellowship of Christian Testimonies to the Jews (FCTJ) was formed in the 1950s by Fred Kendal, founder of a Christian proselytizing group called "Israel's Remnant", with Emil Elbe as a Christian mission to Jews. In 1975, the group condemned Messianic Judaism.
