= Carol Harris-Shapiro =

American rabbi and scholar

- Education: Michigan State University (BA); Reconstructionist Rabbinical College (ordination); Temple University (PhD)
- Occupations: Rabbi, scholar, professor
- Employer: Temple University
- Known for: Scholarship on Messianic Judaism and American Jewish identity
- Spouse: Jon Harris-Shapiro

Carol Harris-Shapiro is a professor at Temple University in the Intellectual Heritage Department and a rabbi ordained in the Reconstructionist movement. She is known for writing a controversial book on Messianic Judaism, a belief system considered by most Christians and Jews to be a form of Christianity, adhered to by groups that seek to combine Christianity and Judaism.

== Early life and education ==
Harris-Shapiro grew up in Northeast Philadelphia, and graduated from Michigan State University in 1982. She received her rabbinical ordination at the Reconstructionist Rabbinical College in 1988, and religiously affiliates with Reconstructionist Judaism. She received a Ph.D. in religion from Temple University in 1992.

== Career ==
Harris-Shapiro has taught at Temple University since 2007. Previously she worked at Villanova University, La Salle University, Philadelphia University, Rosemont College, and Gratz College.

Along with her expertise on Messianic Judaism, Harris-Shapiro is also a scholar on the history of Jewish foods.

== Views ==
She looks at religion from a sociological standpoint, and sees that although Jewish community as a whole accepts Secular Humanistic Jews and Jewish Buddhists as still being "in the fold," Messianic Jews are considered to be heretics. It was this puzzle in the behavior of the Jewish community—accepting atheist and Buddhist Jews, while rejecting Jews practicing Christianity—that led her to explore the Messianic Jewish community in a focused ethnographic study and to think through the issue of legitimacy surrounding Messianic Judaism.

Following the 2015 decision by the Reconstructionist Rabbinical College to ordain rabbis in interfaith marriages, Harris-Shapiro resigned from the Reconstructionist Rabbinical Association (RRA) in protest. She described the decision as the "straw that broke the camel’s back" and that "I immediately resigned."

== Book controversy ==
Her book Messianic Judaism: A Rabbi's Journey through Religious Change in America was the focus of a controversy when it was published in 1999. Harris-Shapiro concluded that given the Jewish community's tacit acceptance of other seemingly "heretical" Jews as part of the ethnic Jewish community, it would be difficult to find a consistently logical reason to reject Messianic Judaism, although she was quite clear that communities can draw boundaries as they see fit. Theologically, she affirmed that Messianic Jews are adherents of Evangelical Christianity.

This was reiterated in an interview with World: The Journal of the Unitarian Universalist Association, where Harris-Shapiro reiterated that she views messianic Judaism as a form of Christianity.

World: Describe the Christianity practiced by Messianic Jews and in particular their appropriation of Jesus.

CHS: They practice evangelical Christianity. Like evangelical Christians, they believe Jesus was both God and man, came to earth, died for our sins, was resurrected on the third day, performed the miracles, and that the New Testament is literally true. Some also hold some fundamentalist beliefs about exactly how one interprets the New Testament. Some are very interested in the millennium, in prophecy, in when or if the rapture is going to happen. Many congregations, though not all, are Pentecostal—that is, they believe in gifts of the spirit such as speaking in tongues, charismatic healing, exorcising demons, and the real presence of Satan that has to be battled.

As for how they see Jesus, that's interesting. Although they accept the theological doctrine that Jesus is both God and human, they don't pray to him. They don't feel comfortable with that. Some Messianic rabbis have even had difficulty accepting Yeshua as God and have been kicked out of the movement.

The idea that "messianic Judaism" could be considered a form of Judaism has been rejected by the overwhelming majority of Jewish historians and rabbis. In a review of her book published in The Forward, Reform Rabbi Eric Yoffie, president of the Union of American Hebrew Congregations called her conclusions absurd, writing that "there's no such thing as a 'messianic Jew.' The whole notion is a fraud.…There will be no compromise on that point." In the same newspaper article on this book, Conservative Rabbi Jerome Epstein, vice president of the United Synagogue of Conservative Judaism and Orthodox Rabbi Lawrence Shiffman, professor of Judaic Studies at New York University also stated that Harris-Shapiro was egregiously incorrect. Shiffman wrote that she "has been sucked into the very conception the missionaries want to create."

Other reviews of the book were more positive. Moment Magazine said that Harris-Shapiro's work was "evenhanded" and "an important book for all those concerned about Judaism's future." Library Journal recommended the book and called it "an unbiased academic study of a community's theology." Booklist said that Harris-Shapiro used "an effective blend of scholarship, interviews, and personal insights" and called the book "compelling and evenhanded."

== Personal life ==
Harris-Shapiro is married to Jon Harris-Shapiro, and lives in Elkins Park near Philadelphia.

== See also ==
- Dan Cohn-Sherbok

== Bibliography ==
- Messianic Judaism: A Rabbi's Journey through Religious Change in America. Beacon Press, 1999 (ISBN 0-8070-1040-5)
- "Sectarian Schooling and Civic Responsibility: 'Social Capital' in American Jewish Day Schools," in Public Education, Democracy and the Common Good (2004), Phi Delta Kappa Press, pp. 141–153.
- "Union of Messianic Jewish Congregations," pp. 1340–1341, in Religions of the World, Vol. 4, ed. J. Gordon Melton and Martin Baumann. Santa Barbara, CA: ABC Clio, 2002.
- "Academic Approaches to Teaching Jewish Studies." Review. Journal of Ecumenical Studies, Winter 2000, 84–85.
- "Sanctifying Relations: American Jews, African-Americans and the Passover Seder" at the AAR Boston, November 1999.
- "'Christian' is a Four-Letter Word: The Construction of Messianic Jewish Identity" at the AAR, November 1997.
- "Double Resistance to the Jewish/Christian Division: The Case of Messianic Judaism" at the Mid-Atlantic Region American Academy of Religion Conference, March 1997.
- "Messianic Jews as Mirror," Reconstructionist, Fall 1994, 36–43.
- "Gender Healing in Messianic Judaism," and "Heteroglossic Identity in Messianic Judaism" at the Pacific Northwest Regional AAR, April 1994.
