= Hebrew Christian Alliance of Great Britain =

The Hebrew Christian Alliance of Great Britain, known today as the British Messianic Jewish Alliance, was founded in 1866 by Carl Schwartz "to promote the combination of Jewish heritage and Christian theology." It incorporated the Hebrew Christian Prayer Union, founded by Henry Aaron Stern in 1882.

== Foundations ==
Beginning in the 19th century, some groups had attempted to create congregations and societies of Jews who had converted to Christianity. The London Society for promoting Christianity amongst the Jews (currently named "Church's Ministry Among Jewish People") was formed in 1809.

The first identifiable congregation made up exclusively of Jews who had converted to Christianity was established in the United Kingdom as early as 1860.

== First congregations ==
The first congregation of Jewish Christians in the United Kingdom was Beni Abraham "which came into existence in London when forty-one Hebrew Christians assembled as Jewish Christians". "In 1866 the Hebrew Christian Alliance of Great Britain was organised with branches in several European countries and the United States. These organisations had the combined effect of encouraging Jewish believers in Jesus to think of themselves as a community with a unique identity."

The International Hebrew Christian Alliance, established 1925, was an initiative of the Hebrew Christian Alliance of America (established 1915) and the Hebrew Christian Alliance of Great Britain.

== See also ==
- Hebrew Christian movement
- Hebrew Christian Alliance of America
- Messianic Judaism
