= Chosen People Ministries =

Evangelical Christian nonprofit organization

Chosen People Ministries (CPM) is an evangelical Christian nonprofit organization that engages in evangelization of Jews. It is headquartered in New York City and led by Mitch Glaser, who was raised Jewish and converted to Christianity.

Its stated mission is to "pray for, evangelize, disciple, and serve Jewish people everywhere and to help fellow believers do the same". It supports the establishment of Messianic Jewish congregations, which it describes as "faith communities that stress the Jewish context of the Gospel of Jesus".

== History ==
Leopold Cohn, a Hungarian-Jewish immigrant to the United States who became a Christian, founded the Brownsville Mission to the Jews in 1894. The Brownsville Mission later expanded to the Williamsburg section of Brooklyn, New York and became the Williamsburg Mission to the Jews from 1897 until 1924. In 1897, the Williamsburg Mission headquarters housed a medical clinic, boys' club, Girl Scouts, and sewing and English classes, in addition to evening Gospel services.

Leopold Cohn died in 1937. His son, Joseph Hoffman Cohn, became executive director, running ABMJ until his death in 1953. From 1924 until 1986 the organization was known as the American Board of Missions to the Jews, but in 1986 it changed its name to Chosen People Ministries (CPM).

Between 1953 and 1997, various Christian leaders served as head of CPM. In 1997, former Jews for Jesus missionary Mitch Glaser became president of CPM.

== Methods and locations ==
Chosen People Ministries has staff in 16 countries. It also sends out missionaries and conducts evangelism in areas of high Jewish concentration, teaches in churches, and produces evangelical literature and media.

=== Centers ===
==== Brooklyn, New York - The Charles L. Feinberg Center ====
In 2010, Chosen People Ministries attracted attention when it acquired a former funeral home in the heart of an Orthodox Jewish community located in Midwood, Brooklyn. This acquisition sparked anger from the Jewish community in New York. The Center opened in 2014 and houses an English-speaking congregation, a Russian-speaking congregation, and an accredited seminary program.

The seminary program, The Charles L. Feinberg Center for Messianic Jewish Studies, is co-sponsored with Talbot School of Theology and offers an accredited Master of Divinity program in Messianic Jewish Studies. The program is designed to train Messianic congregational leaders, outreach workers and educators. In addition to the full Master of Divinity program, it offers a 6-course Certificate in Messianic Jewish studies. Classes are held in Brooklyn at the Feinberg Center, though the summer program includes classes at Talbot's Los Angeles campus.

==== Berlin, Germany ====
In 2012, the organization a building dedicated to Jewish evangelism in Berlin, Germany. The Berlin center hosts a hospitality network, Shabbat fellowships, tandem language partnerships, and friendship ministries.

==== Ramat Gan, Israel ====
In 2017, Chosen People Ministries opened a Messianic Center in the Ramat Gan area of Greater Tel Aviv. The center hosts seminars on parenting, financial management, biblical counseling, as well as a bi-weekly women's Bible study.

==== Toronto, Canada ====
In 2019, Chosen People Ministries opened the Toronto Messianic Centre in Toronto, Ontario, Canada. The centre houses the headquarters of Chosen People Ministries in Canada, as well as serves as the meeting place for Kehillat Eytz Chaim (Tree of Life Congregation).

== Church affiliations and memberships ==
Chosen People Ministries has stated that it is a member of the Evangelical Council for Financial Accountability, CrossGlobal Link, the Canadian Council of Christian Charities, the Christian Stewardship Association and the Evangelical Fellowship of Canada.

== Suggested reading ==
- Evangelizing the chosen people: missions to the Jews in America, by Yaakov Shalom Ariel, published in 2000
