= Messianic Jewish Alliance of America =

US Messianic Jewish organization

The Messianic Jewish Alliance of America (MJAA) is an American Messianic Jewish organization. Founded in 1915 as the Hebrew Christian Alliance of America, it adopted its present name in 1975. It follows on from the International Hebrew Christian Alliance between the Hebrew Christian Alliance of Great Britain and that of America.

As Messianic Jews, MJAA congregations teach a belief in Jesus Christ (whom they call "Yeshua") as their messiah. They identify as Jewish and continuing to celebrate Jewish customs. For Messianic Jews, the Bible, the Old Testament (whom Jews call the "Tanakh") and the New Testament (especially the 4 Gospels) form the basis of their faith. They are convinced that the Bible in its entirety is inspired by God. They further believe that one day all Jews will be Messianic Jews and that they will lead all of Israel, the Jews, and the gentile Christian world in worship of the one true God, understanding this to be the Messianic Age.

== History ==
The Hebrew Christian Alliance of America began in the early 19th century as a mission by Hebrew Christians to Jews. The organization was under the sponsorship of Philip Milledoler of the Reformed Dutch Church. Their efforts led to the formation in December 1816 of the first American Christian mission to Jews, which was incorporated on April 14, 1820, as the American Society for Meliorating the Condition of the Jews, spearheaded by Joseph Samuel C. F. Frey. There were, however, few Jews in the US at the time, and the organization was run by Christian leaders of a variety of denominations.

Various independent efforts were united at the Hebrew Christian Alliance of the United States in 1905, in partnership with Hebrew Christian Alliances of other countries, most notably the Hebrew Christian Alliance of Great Britain founded by Carl Schwartz in 1866.

in 1975, the Hebrew Christian Alliance of America changed its name to the Messianic Jewish Alliance of America under the leadership of Martin Chernoff.

== Youth organization ==
The Young Messianic Jewish Alliance (YMJA) is a national organization for members of the Messianic Jewish Alliance of America between 13 and 30 years old.

== See also ==
- Church's Ministry Among Jewish People (CMJ), Anglican body, formerly the London Jews' Society.
- Hebrew Christian movement, description of various 19th-century bodies and individuals.
- Union of Messianic Jewish Congregations
