= David A. Rausch =

American author and academic (1947–2023)

- Born: June 22, 1947; Warren, Ohio, U.S.
- Died: January 4, 2023 (aged 75)
- Occupations: Historian, author

David A. Rausch (1947–2023) was an author and Professor of History at Ashland University in Ohio.

== Early life ==
Rausch was born on June 22, 1947, in Warren, Ohio, to Samuel Albert Rausch and Marion June Palette Rausch.

== Education and career ==
Rausch received his M.A. in history from Youngstown State University in 1973 with a thesis "The Historical Jesus: A Current Perspective," and his Ph.D. in history from Kent State University in 1978 with a thesis "Proto-Fundamentalism's Attitudes toward Zionism, 1878–1918."

He spent most of his academic career as a professor at Ashland University in Ohio — first as Professor of Church History and Judaic Studies at Ashland Theological Seminary (a seminary associated with The Brethren Church and graduate school within Ashland University) from 1980 to 1990, then as Professor of History at Ashland University from 1990 to 2005. He served as Chair of the History and Political Science Department at Ashland University.

Rausch wrote hundreds of articles more than three dozen books.

== Death ==
Rausch died on January 4, 2023, aged 75.

== Books ==
Among the most widely held books by Rausch are the following

- Zionism within Early American Fundamentalism, 1878–1918: A Convergence of Two Traditions (Lewiston, New York: Edwin Mellen Press, 1979)
- Messianic Judaism: Its History, Theology, and Polity (Lewiston, New York: Edwin Mellen Press, 1982)
- Arno C. Gaebelein, 1861–1945: Irenic Fundamentalist and Scholar; including conversations with Dr. Frank E. Gaebelein (Lewiston, New York: Edwin Mellen Press, 1983)
- (editor) Louis Meyer's Eminent Hebrew Christians of the Nineteenth Century: Brief Biographical Sketches (1983)
- A Legacy of Hatred: Why Christians must not Forget the Holocaust (Baker, 1984)
- Protestantism: Its Modern Meaning (Fortress Press, 1987)
- Building Bridges: Understanding Jews and Judaism (1988)
- World Religions: Our Quest for Meaning (Trinity Press International, 1989)
- The Middle East Maze: Israel and her Neighbors (Moody, 1991)
- Communities in Conflict: Evangelicals and Jews (Trinity Press International, 1991)
- Fundamentalist-Evangelicals and Anti-Semitism (Trinity Press International, 1992)
- Native American Voices (Baker Books, 1994)
- A Historical, Philosophical, and Pragmatic Approach to Penology (Lewiston, New York: Edwin Mellen Press, 1995)
- Friends, Colleagues, and Neighbors: Jewish Contributions to American History (Baker, 1996)
