= Union of Messianic Jewish Congregations =

Religious organization based in the United States

The Union of Messianic Jewish Congregations (UMJC) is an international Messianic Jewish organization which supports Messianic Jewish congregations. The organization is based in Melbourne, Florida, US.

== History ==
The organisation grew out of the early Hebrew Christian Movement. In the 19th century, Jews who converted to Christianity would normally join a Christian church. After World War II, many Messianic Jews decided to continue to identify as Jewish. As such, many new Messianic Jewish congregations appeared, especially across the US. Some of these congregations came together to form alliances. One of these alliances was the UMJC.

The Messianic Jewish Alliance of America (MJAA) was founded in 1915. In 1979, nineteen congregations broke away and formed the UMJC in Mechanicsburg, Pennsylvania. The previous division has now been healed.

In 2010, there were 65 congregations in the United States. As of 2023, it has 70 congregations in 6 countries. The President is Rabbi Barney Kasdan.

== Mission ==
UMJC has the following missions;

- To further the establishment, and growth of MJ Congregations worldwide.
- To be a voice for MJs worldwide.
- To provide a forum for the discussion of issues relevant to MJs
- To aid in the causes of Jewish people worldwide, especially in Israel.
- To support the training of Messianic Leaders.

To carry out this work, they have several programmes;

- Planters Program to establish new congregations.
- Internship Program to trains Bible school and seminary graduates.
- Humanitarian aid and scholarships.
- Continuing education programs to equip congregational leaders.

The UMJC is seen as emphasizing Jewish tradition, stressing the duty of MJs to keep Jewish traditions, such as circumcision and keeping kosher, as they are a part of God’s special calling for Jews.
