= Carl Schwartz =

Polish-born British clergyman (1817–1870)

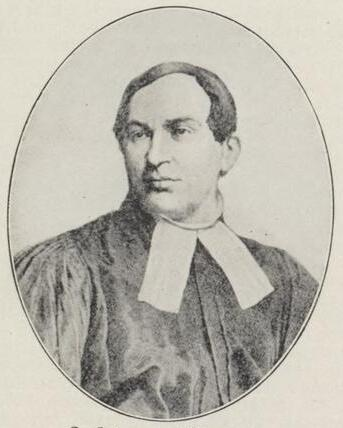
Carl Schwartz

August Ferdinand Carl Schwartz DD (1817–1870) was a Hebrew Christian clergyman and minister of the Free Church of Scotland serving in Amsterdam and London.

== Life ==
He was born on 20 January 1817 in Meseritz in Prussia, now Międzyrzec Podlaski in Poland, the son of Isaac Levin Schwartz and Bertha Wollstein. He studied at the universities of Berlin and Halle.

Carl Schwartz converted to Christianity while at university in Prussia. He appears to have moved to London in the 1840s and was representative of the London Jews' Society in Constantinople in 1842. While there he met Rev Robert Walter Stewart of the Leghorn mission. The Society abandoned their mission there in 1843 and by some mechanism he transferred to the mission linked to the newly created Free Church of Scotland (possibly the latter took over his existing mission building). In 1844 he took on the role of Free Church of Scotland missionary to the Jews in Berlin, staying in this position until 1849. He then served a similar role for the Free Church of Scotland in Amsterdam from 1849 to 1864.

Letter by Carl Schwartz (1851)

From 1864 Schwartz was minister of Trinity Chapel, in Newnham Street (earlier John Street) off the Edgware Road in London. There he succeeded the previous minister, Ridley Herschell, himself also a Polish-born Jew who had been converted to evangelical Christianity. Schwartz in 1865 sent letters to many Christians of Jewish origin known to him, calling for a united Hebrew Christian congregation. In 1867 he became minister of Harrow Road Presbyterian Church, also continuing on his work of converting Jews, now in London.

He died on 24 August 1870 in Kensington in London.

== Family ==
Schwartz married twice; first, in 1843, Maria Dorothea Saphir of Budapest, the sister of Adolph Saphir, another Jewish-convert Protestant minister. She died in 1850; he then, in 1851, married Cornelia van Vollenhoven of Rotterdam. Among his children was Jozua Marius Willem Schwartz (known under his pen-name as novelist Maarten Maartens).

== Publications ==
- The Scattered Nation in 3 volumes (Vol. 1, Vol. 2, Vol. 3)
