= Joseph Samuel C. F. Frey =

German missionary to the Jews (1771–1850)

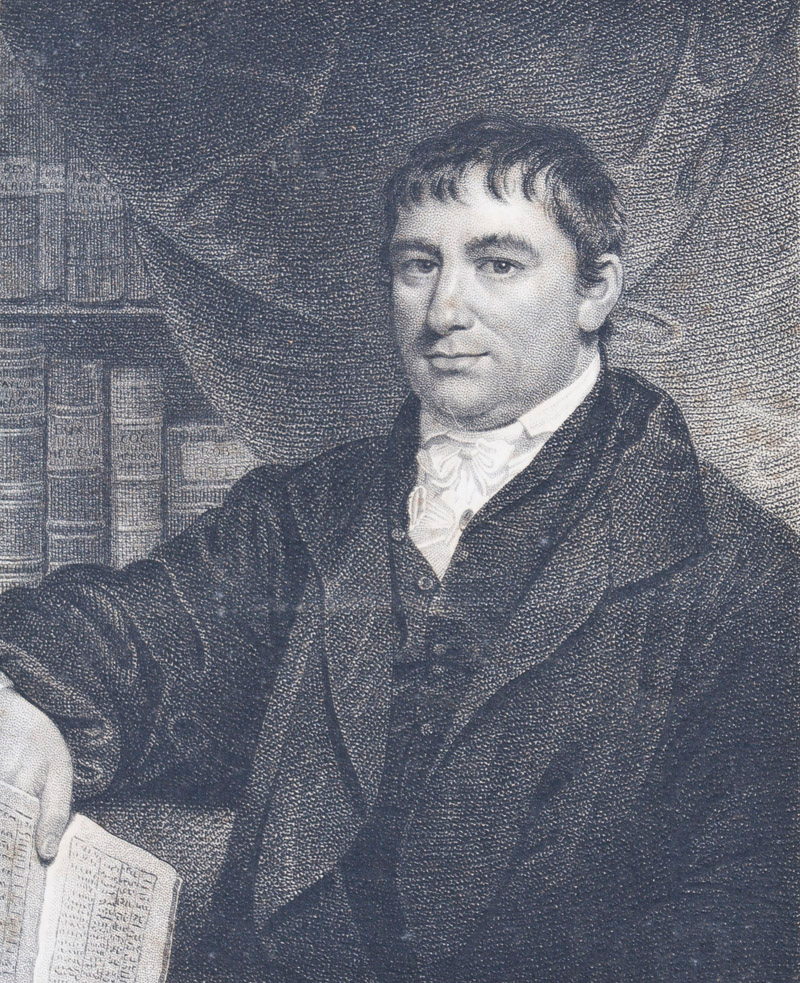
Joseph Samuel Frey.

Joseph Samuel Christian Frederick Frey (born Joseph Levi; September 21, 1771–1850) was a German activist who sought to convert Jews to Christianity. He was active in London and in the United States.

He was born in Maynstockheim, Franconia, the third of ten children. He was raised in an orthodox Jewish home. He converted to Lutheranism on May 8, 1798. He subsequently became an activist, seeking to convert other Jews to Christianity. He was active in London before migrating to New York. His writings portrayed Jews very negatively.

In 1809 he founded the London Society for promoting Christianity amongst the Jews after disagreements with the London Missionary Society.

== Works ==
- Joseph and Benjamin: letters on the controversy between Jews and Christians : comprising the most important doctrines of the Christian religion. 1837
- A Hebrew, Latin and English Dictionary; containing all the Hebrew and Chaldee Words used in the Old Testament, published in 1815 by Gale and Fenner, Paternoster-Row
- Narrative of the Rev. Joseph Samuel C. F. Frey, 1834, digital at archive.org
