= Paul Feinberg =

American theologian (1938–2004)

- Born: Paul David Feinberg; August 13, 1938; Dallas, Texas, U.S.
- Died: February 21, 2004 (aged 65); Highland Park, Illinois, U.S.
- Education: University of California at Los Angeles (B.A., 1960); Talbot Theological Seminary (B.D., 1963 and Th.M., 1964); Dallas Theological Seminary (Th.D., 1968); Roosevelt University (M.A., 1971)
- Spouse: Iris Nadine
- Children: 3
- Relatives: John (brother); Charles (father)
- Scientific career
- Fields: Theology
- Workplaces: Moody Bible Institute; Trinity College; Evangelical Philosophical Society; Japan Bible Seminary; Asian Theological Seminary of Manila; Tyndale Theological Seminary; Italian Bible Institute of Rome
- Thesis: The doctrine of God in the Pentateuch (1968)

Paul David Feinberg (August 13, 1938 – February 21, 2004) was an American theologian, author, and professor of systematic theology and philosophy of religion at Trinity Evangelical Divinity School.

== Education and family ==
Feinberg was born on August 13, 1938, to Charles Lee and Anne Priscilla (née Fraiman) Feinberg. His family moved from Dallas, Texas to Los Angeles, California in 1948 when his father became the first dean of Talbot Theological Seminary. Feinberg graduated from the University of California, Los Angeles with a B.A. in history in 1960. For the next four years, he studied divinity at Talbot Theological Seminary, completing his B.D. in 1963 and Th.M. in 1964. He completed doctoral studies at Dallas Theological Seminary, graduating with a Th.D. in 1968. He completed additional studies in philosophy at Roosevelt University, completing an M.A. with a thesis on the verification principle in 1971.

Feinberg was married in 1967 to Iris Nadine (née Taylor), whom he met at Moody. Paul's brother John (born 1946) served as the chair of the Department of Biblical and Systematic Theology at Trinity Evangelical Divinity School.

== Career ==
Feinberg taught from 1966 to 1970 at Moody Bible Institute, then from 1970 to 1972 at Trinity College. From 1972 through 1974, he served as a field representative for the American Board of Missions to the Jews, and then joined the faculty of Trinity Evangelical Divinity School, where he taught the rest of his life.

Feinberg was also an ordained minister in the Evangelical Free Church of America, and in 1977 he helped found the Village Church (EFCA) of Lincolnshire, Illinois. From 1978 to 1979, he served a year as president of the Evangelical Philosophical Society. He also taught at the Japan Bible Seminary, Asian Theological Seminary in Manila, Tyndale Theological Seminary in the Netherlands, and the Italian Bible Institute in Rome.

He was also a pitcher at UCLA during his college career.

== Works ==
=== Thesis ===
- Feinberg, Paul D. (1968). The Doctrine of God in the Pentateuch (Th.D.). Dallas, TX: Dallas Theological Seminary. OCLC 38029512.
- ——— (1971). A survey of the primary formulations of and major objections to the verification principle (M.A.). Roosevelt University. OCLC 19818142.

=== Books ===
- ———; Geisler, Norman L. (1980). Introduction to Philosophy: A Christian Perspective. Grand Rapids, MI: Baker Book House. ISBN 978-0-801-03735-1. OCLC 6681647.
- ———; Feinberg, John S., eds. (1981). Tradition and Testament: essays in honor of Charles Lee Feinberg. Chicago, IL: Moody Press. ISBN 978-0-802-42544-7. OCLC 7653379.
- ———; Feinberg, John S. (1993). Ethics for a Brave New World. Wheaton, IL: Crossway Books. ISBN 978-1-433-51696-2.

=== Chapters ===
- Feinberg, Paul D. (1981). "An Exegetical and Theological Study of Daniel 9:24-27". In ———; Feinberg, John S. (eds.). Tradition and Testament: Essays in Honor of Charles Lee Feinberg. Chicago: Moody Press. ISBN 0-8024-2544-5. OCLC 1302552237.
- ———; et al. (1984). "The Case for the Pretribulation Rapture Position". The Rapture: Pre-, Mid-, or Post-Tribulational?. Contemporary Evangelical Perspectives. Grand Rapids, MI: Academie Books. ISBN 978-0-310-44741-2. OCLC 10229066.
- ——— (2000). "Cumulative Case Apologetics". In Cowan, Steven B. (ed.). Five Views on Apologetics. Counterpoints. Grand Rapids, MI: Zondervan. ISBN 978-0-310-22476-1. OCLC 42680575. - and responses to other views.

He also contributed articles to Baker's Dictionary of Christian Ethics and the Wycliffe Bible Encyclopedia, as well as a chapter in Inerrancy by Norman Geisler.

=== Journal articles ===
- ——— (1980). "The Kenosis And Christology: An Exegetical-Theological Analysis Of Phil 2:6-11". Trinity Journal. 1 (1): 21–46.
- ——— (Spring 1999). "The Christian and Civil Authorities". The Master's Seminary Journal. 10 (1): 87–99.

== Death ==
Feinberg died of congestive heart failure on February 21, 2004, in Highland Park, Illinois, after earlier falling and fracturing a hip at Trinity.
