= Marie A. Kelleher =

Medieval history scholar

Marie A. Kelleher (1970–May 6, 2024) was a medieval history scholar and professor at California State University, Long Beach. She has published several works of scholarship in medieval Iberia, the Mediterranean, and regarding the medieval world, gender, and law. One of which is her book The Measure of Woman: Law and Female Identity in the Crown of Aragon (2011), which focuses on a large analysis over the relationship between law and gender, especially that of women, in 14th century Crown of Aragon. It is also the winner of the American Historical Association's 2012 Premio del Rey. She also has another book, The Hungry City: Food, Famine, and a Year in the Life of Medieval Barcelona, which was published posthumously in January 2025 via Cornell University Press. She was diagnosed with cancer in March 2024, and died on May 6.

== Life ==
Dr. Kelleher, as her faculty page notes, "was raised in Portland, Oregon and completed her Ph.D. at the University of Kansas." Since 2003, Dr. Kelleher "has taught courses in medieval history at CSULB" and also, within that topic, taught about the Mediterranean medieval world, and medieval gender, in a broad range of topics. She "has been the recipient of numerous national grants and fellowships," including a Solmsen fellowship from 2007 to 2008. Dr. Kelleher was a member and board member of the American Academy of Research Historians of Medieval Spain as the Conference Organizer/Events Coordinator. In 2021, she participated in the Media-Eval podcast, where she talked about the Netflix miniseries The Cathedral of the Sea.

== Research interests ==
=== Piracy and Famine in Iberia ===
Dr. Kelleher has researched in-depth on many topics regarding medieval Iberia, especially in the Crown of Aragon and/or Barcelona. She has written and researched regarding Iberian law and governance, highlighting topics such as state-sponsored piracy and corsairing, where the “boundary between lawfulness and outlawry” is vaguely distinguished, and how they relate or were invoked by famines. In regards to famines, she has also published research relating to how the government and citizens would react to famines, and what consisted of their consumer basket and how it related to social status within Barcelona.

=== Law and Women in the Crown of Aragon ===
Dr. Kelleher has also contributed to feminine medieval studies, exploring the "negotiable space" in which society had interpreted "in ways that suggest that the relationship between law and gender was negotiable, at least within limits." Within this context, she also explored the law of dowry and it's customary system within the Crown, and also how women used their husbands' financial responsibility over property in order to litigate to their own economic benefit. She highlights the expansion of female agency with this research, which contrasts with the common idea that women had no authority over their marital property.

She also expands with her first book, The Measure of Woman: Law and Female Identity in the Crown of Aragon, to extend her research over factors such as the imported combination of Roman law and canon law called the "ius commune," or common law. The book also covers the complexity of this combination in female topics which appear in court, such as sexual transgression, violence and persecution, as well as gendered legal assumptions being adopted by women willingly in order to leverage being deserving of protection.

== Awards and Recognitions ==
- 2007-2008 Solmsen Fellowship
- American Historical Association’s 2012 “Premio del Rey” for her book The Measure of Woman: Law and Female Identity in the Crown of Aragon.

== Works ==
Dr. Kelleher has published numerous scholarly works:

=== Books ===
- The Measure of Woman: Law and Female Identity in the Crown of Aragon, University of Pennsylvania Press, 2011.
- The Hungry City: Food, Famine, and a Year in the Life of Medieval Barcelona, Cornell University Press, 2025.

=== Journal Articles ===
- "Hers by Right: Gendered Legal Assumptions and Women's Property in the Medieval Crown of Aragon." Journal of Women's History 22, no. 2 (2010).
- “Eating from a Corrupted Table: Food Regulations and Civic Health in Barcelona’s ‘First Bad Year.’” Journal of Iberian Studies 25, (2013), pgs. 61-64.
- “What Do We Mean by ‘Women and Power’?” Medieval Feminist Forum 51, no. 2 (2015), pgs. 104-15.
- “‘The Sea of Our City’: Famine, Piracy, and Urban Sovereignty in Medieval Barcelona.” Mediterranean Studies 24, no. 1 (2016), pgs. 1–22.
- “Witnessing from the Margins: Legal Testimony of Doubly Differenced Women in the Middle Ages.” Quaestiones Medii Aevi Novae 19 (2014), pgs. 145–158.
- “Later Medieval Law in Community Context.” The Oxford Handbook of Women and Gender in Medieval Europe, Judith Bennett and Ruth Mazo Karras, eds., pgs. 133–147. Oxford University Press, 2013.
- “Law and the Maiden: Inquisitio, Fama, and the Testimony of Children in Medieval Catalonia.” Viator 37 (2006), pgs. 351–367.
- “‘Like Man and Wife’: Clerics’ Concubines in the Diocese of Barcelona.” Journal of Medieval History 28 (2002), pgs. 349–360.
