= Pamela Ayo Yetunde =

Buddhist counselor, hospice worker, and educator (born 1961)

- Born: 1961 (age 64–65); Indianapolis, Indiana, United States
- Education: Zen Hospice Project; Sati Center for Buddhist Studies; Ball State University; Indiana University Maurer School of Law; Holy Names University; Columbia Theological Seminary
- Occupations: Buddhist pastoral counselor, hospice worker writer and educator
- Employer(s): Harvard Divinity School; United Theological Seminary
- Website: pamelaayoyetunde.com

Pamela Ayo Yetunde (born 1961) is an American Buddhist pastoral counselor, hospice worker, writer and educator. She is the author of Casting Indra's Nett: Fostering Spiritual Kinship and Community (2023) and Object Relations, Buddhism, and Relationality in Womanist Practical Theology (2018) and co-editor of Black and Buddhist: What Buddhism Can Teach Us about Race, Resilience, Transformation, and Freedom (2020).

== Biography ==
Yetunde was born in 1961 in Indianapolis, Indiana, United States. She attended the United Methodist Church while growing up. Her father died of cardiac arrest when she was eight years old, which made her fearful of death.

After graduating from high school, Yetunde attended Ball State University in Muncie, Indiana, to study journalism. After graduating from college in 1984, she joined the Anabaptist Church of the Brethren service organization and spent two years working on nuclear disarmament and human rights in the Netherlands. She also travelled to Zimbabwe for six weeks with Operation Crossroads Africa. After returning to the United States, she enrolled in at Indiana University Maurer School of Law, graduating in 1992, then worked as a Naturalization and Immigration Political Asylum officer.

After coming out as a lesbian, Yetunde was shunned by her family. She attended the LGBTQ-affirming Glide Memorial United Methodist Church in California. Her cousin died from HIV/AIDS in 1992, leading Yetunde to hospice and counselling training with the Zen Hospice Project in San Francisco. Questioning her Christian faith, she studied Zen and Buddhism then undertook Buddhist chaplaincy training at the Sati Center for Buddhist Studies in Redwood City, California. She then worked as a hospice chaplain.

While working as a hospice chaplain, Yetunde studied a master's degree in Culture and Spirituality at the Holy Names University in Oakland, California, graduating in 2007. She studied a Doctor of Theology in Pastoral Counseling at Columbia Theological Seminary in Decatur, Georgia, graduating in 2016, and completed post-doctoral work at Harvard Divinity School in Cambridge, Massachusetts.

In 2020, Yetunde co-founded the Center of the Heart wellness practice. In February 2021, Yetunde convened the first week-long Black and Buddhist Summit. She has presented at the Parliament of the World's Religions and the American Psychosocial Oncology Society on the feminist writer Audre Lorde.

In 2022, Yetunde was named an Outstanding Woman in Buddhism by the International Women's Meditation Center Foundation. She currently works as an Assistant Professor of Pastoral and Spiritual Care at United Theological Seminary in Ohio.

== Select publications ==
- Object Relations, Buddhism, and Relationality in Womanist Practical Theology (2018)
- "Audre Lorde's Hopelessness and Hopefulness: Cultivating a Womanist Nondualism for Psycho-Spiritual Wholeness". Feminist Theology, 27(2), 2019.
- Black and Buddhist: What Buddhism Can Teach Us about Race, Resilience, Transformation, and Freedom (2020), co-edited with Cheryl A. Giles
- "Buddhism in the Age of #Black Lives Matter." Lion's Roar (2020)
- Casting Indra's Nett: Fostering Spiritual Kinship and Community (2023)
- Dearly Beloved: Prince, Spirituality, and This Thing Called Life (2025)

Yetunde also provided the foreword for Midwifing--A Womanist Approach to Pastoral Counseling. Investigating the Fractured Self, Slavery, Violence, and the Black Woman (2019) by Myrna Thurmond-Malone.
