= Michael Bauman =

Michael Bauman may refer to:

- Michael Bauman (cinematographer), American cinematographer
- Michael Bauman (theologian) (1950–2019), American theologian

== See also ==
- Michael Baumann (disambiguation)
