= Paul Copan =

American philosopher (born 1962)

- Born: September 26, 1962 (age 64); Cleveland, Ohio, U.S.

Education
- Education: Columbia International University (BA); Trinity International University (MA, MDiv); Marquette University (PhD)
- Thesis: The Moral Dimensions of Michael Martin's Atheology: A Critical Assessment (2000)

Philosophical work
- School: Analytic
- Institutions: Palm Beach Atlantic University
- Main interests: Ethics, Philosophy of Religion
- Website: www.paulcopan.com

Paul Copan (/koʊpæn/, born September 26, 1962) is an American Christian theologian, analytic philosopher, apologist, and author. He is currently a professor at the Palm Beach Atlantic University and holds the endowed Pledger Family Chair of Philosophy and Ethics. He has written and edited over 45 books in the area of philosophy of religion, apologetics, theology, and ethics in the Bible. He has contributed a great number of articles to various professional journals and has written many essays for edited books. For six years he served as the president of the Evangelical Philosophical Society.

== Early life and education ==
Paul Copan's father, Valery Copan, was of Ukrainian origin, and his mother, Valtraut (Kirsch) Copan, was born in Riga, Latvia. He was born in Cleveland, Ohio and then moved to Connecticut as a teenager.

From 1980 to 1984, he attended Columbia International University and earned a B.A. degree in biblical studies. Copan attended Trinity International University, where he received his M.A. in philosophy of religion, as well as his M.Div. at Trinity International. Copan received the Prof. C.B. Bjuge Award for a thesis that “evidences creative scholarship in the field of Biblical and Systematic Theology.”

In May 2000, Copan received his Ph.D. in philosophy of religion from Marquette University in Milwaukee, Wisconsin. His dissertation topic was "The Moral Dimensions of Michael Martin’s Atheology: A Critical Assessment."

== Career ==
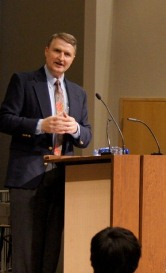
Copan at Tyndale University College. His talk, "Slavery and Genocide? A Fresh Look at Two Old Testament Ethical Issues" addressed charges that the Old Testament condones slavery and genocide.

Copan started his career by working on the pastoral staff of First Presbyterian Church in Schenectady, NY from July 1989 – December 1995. He also served as a volunteer campus minister for InterVarsity Christian Fellowship at Union College from 1992 – 1995.

He was an Adjunct Associate Professor of Philosophy of Religion/Systematic Theology at Trinity International University (Deerfield, Illinois) from September 1996 – May 1998, and returned as a Visiting associate professor from June 2000 – June 2003. He was a Visiting associate professor of Christian Thought at Alliance Theological Seminary in Nyack, NY from January 2002 – January 2004. He was Adjunct Associate Professor of Theology and Philosophy at Bethel Seminary in St. Paul, MN from Fall 2003 – March 2004.

He has lectured and debated at many universities over the course of his career, including the University of Helsinki (2016), Aarhus University in Denmark (2015), Moscow State University (2002), Cal Poly (2009), Nanyang University in Singapore (2019), the University of Reading (2017), Cambridge University (2017), Wycliffe Hall, Oxford University (2017) and Oriel College, Oxford University (2024), Boston College (2001, 2002) and Boston College Law School (2012), the University of Miami (2009), the University of Northern Colorado (2005), Harvard University (2000), and many others.

Currently, Copan holds the Pledger Family Chair of Philosophy and Ethics, and is a professor of Philosophy and Ethics at Palm Beach Atlantic University in West Palm Beach, FL, where he has worked since 2004. He helped establish the university's M.A. in Philosophy of Religion program, which began in 2021. Additionally, an undergraduate degree in Apologetics at Palm Beach Atlantic University was launched in August 2022, with Copan teaching several of its courses.

== Views ==
=== Atheism ===
He has criticized the presumption of atheism (i.e., the notion that atheism should be one's default position when evaluating arguments over the existence of God). He argues that such a position rigs the rules, since atheism is just as much a claim to knowledge as theism. The only natural default position is agnosticism. Copan cites atheists such as Baggini and Flew in arguing that atheism is not a mere lack of belief but a rejection of belief in God or gods. He argues that atheists often slide into defending agnosticism when asked for reasons for their view.

He suggests that scientific naturalists will argue that all claims of knowledge have to be scientifically verifiable; otherwise, they are meaningless. Copan argues that such a position commits the fallacy exemplified in Horton Hears a Who: "If you cannot see, hear, or feel something, it does not exist." Copan argues that this position is an arbitrary philosophical (rather than scientific) pronouncement. He also argues that the position of the scientific naturalist is self-refuting because scientism itself cannot be scientifically verified.

Copan also believes that belief in God is generally not a psychological crutch, claiming that the argument that Christianity is wish fulfillment itself falls victim to a number of fallacies. He notes that Freud himself admitted to Oskar Pfister that psychoanalysis of religion has no clinical evidence, and are merely Freud's personal views. Copan also argues that it is odd and arbitrary to claim that whatever brings comfort and solace is false. He notes that a comforting father figure, while unique to the biblical faith, is not at the heart of the other world religions. Copan also notes that the wish fulfillment argument against Christianity is a classic example of the genetic fallacy, claiming that because one can explain how the belief arose, that the belief is therefore false.

=== Presuppositionalism ===
Copan is also a critic of presuppositionalism, arguing that Christians can use common ground to engage non-Christians in debate. He argues that presuppositionalism begs the question. It assumes that God exists in order to argue that God exists. Instead, Christians can begin dialogues with non-Christians with common ground such as the law of non-contradiction. Copan uses Genesis 9:6 to make his point. He claims that the image of God was not completely destroyed in the fall, meaning that non-Christians can respond to general revelation, arguments from cosmology and history, as well as personal testimony and living a godly life. Ultimately, Copan argues, presuppositionalism confuses private knowledge of God with public proclamation and argument for God. One can have epistemic certainty of God's existence from private experience and still appeal to public evidence to persuade others of that fact.

=== Old Testament Ethics ===
Copan is known for responding to Old Testament ethical challenges and difficulties, particularly charges of "genocide" and "slavery."

==== Warfare ====
He argues that the books of Joshua and Judges are literarily connected, and therefore need to be read in light of one another. The book of Judges demonstrates that military engagement is indeed a part of biblical history.

As for the commands to execute herem, he argues that phrases such as "utterly destroy" are hyperboles. Evidence includes Joshua warning the Israelites to not follow the religious practices of the "nations among you" even though Joshua was described to "utterly destroy" these nations in the previous chapters. Other contemporary Near Eastern military reports use this language to describe attacks that left many survivors, for the purposes of expressing bravado.

Copan also observes that the herem commands include merisms such as "young and old", "man and woman", which denoted total warfare in the Near Eastern context, even if the victims were combatants living in military garrisons and forts, which were unlikely to have women and children. He argues that no civilians existed in cities such as Jericho and Ai, which were targets of herem, based on the archaeological evidence.

Copan also comments on Numbers 31 in his work on Old Testament warfare. He argues that this passage may have used hyperbolic warfare language when Moses commanded the Israelites to wipe out the Midianites, or Moses may have issued an unauthorized command.

==== Slavery ====
Copan argues that the Biblical concept of slavery is misunderstood. He says that we should compare Hebrew debt-servanthood (many translations render this “slavery”) more fairly to apprentice-like positions to pay off debts. This resembles indentured servitude during America's founding when people worked for approximately 7 years to pay off the debt for their passage to the New World. Copan states that God did not allow physical abuse of servants. If a servant was harmed, for example, by having a tooth or eye knocked out, the servant received freedom immediately. Masters who killed their servants were put to death.

He also argues that the New Testament is not silent on the issue of slavery. During the first century, 85 to 90 percent of Rome's population consisted of slaves in both lowly and prestigious positions. This was a much higher percent than Israel had in the Old Testament, but this was due to Rome's policies and laws. Copan uses James 3:9 to argue that the New Testament presupposes a fundamental equality because all humans are created in God's image. Christian masters called Christian slaves “brothers” or “sisters.” The New Testament commanded masters to show compassion, justice, and patience. Their position as master meant responsibility and service, not oppression and privilege. Given the spiritual equality of slave and free, slaves even took on leadership positions in churches. He states that early Christians undermined slavery indirectly, rejecting many common Greco-Roman assumptions about it and acknowledging the intrinsic, equal worth of slaves.

Copan argues that if the New Testament authors had been too explicit about overthrowing Rome's slavery system, it would have done the gospel a disservice. Rome would have quashed any such flagrant opposition with speedy, lethal force. Copan concludes that the New Testament took a more subversive strategy, by opposing oppression, slave trade, and treating humans as cargo (Revelation 18:13).

==== Imprecatory Psalms ====
Copan defends the Old Testament imprecatory psalms, which are psalms that call down curses and divine judgments against Israel's enemies. He argues that they fit into the literary genre of the time. He states "Consider how you would react if a neighbor tried to seduce your daughter or give your children drugs. Outrage indicates that we care and take injustice seriously." Copan also compares these psalms to the emotional rants of Jeremiah, wishing he had remained in his mother's womb until he died. Jeremiah's desire was one of emotional outburst, and he did not sincerely believe what he said. Copan argues that the imprecatory Psalms should be read in the same way.

== Personal life ==
Copan is married to Jacqueline Mariette (van Tol) Copan, the daughter of Dutch parents, and they have six children.

He is an avid birder and loves history (particularly the periods of the Renaissance and Reformation, colonial America, the Civil War/Abraham Lincoln, and World War II). He and his wife enjoy classical music (particularly Bach, Handel, Mendelssohn), art (particularly Rembrandt, Vermeer, and other Dutch/Flemish painters; the Impressionists, especially van Gogh), gardening, hiking, visiting national parks, taking epic road US trips, international traveling, and frequenting museums, and exploring their favorite part of the US—New England.

== Memberships ==
=== Society memberships ===
- Society of Christian Philosophers, 1986–present.
- Evangelical Theological Society, 1995–present.
- Evangelical Philosophical Society, 1997–present.
  - President, 2006–2012
- Society of Biblical Literature (and American Academy of Religion), 1999–present.

=== Other Involvements ===
- Board of Contributors, Christian Research Journal, 2006–present.
- Editorial reviewer, Philosophia Christi
- Former board member of PEER Servants
- Global Scholars: Member, Board of Advisors
- Tyndale Fellowship, Chair of Philosophy of Religion Study Group
- Blind reviewer for the following journals: Res Philosophica, Philosophia Christi, Faith and Philosophy, The Christian Scholar’s Review, Religious Studies, Religions, and Perspectives on Science and the Christian Faith.

== Bibliography ==
=== Edited ===
- Holy War in the Bible: Christian Morality and an Old Testament Problem. (Downers Grove, IL: IVP Academic, 2013.)
- The Routledge Companion to Philosophy of Religion. (2nd edn.: London: Routledge, 2013.)
- Come Let Us Reason: New Essays in Christian Apologetics. (Nashville: B&H Academic, 2012.)
- Contending With Christianity's Critics: Answering New Atheists & Other Objectors. (Nashville: B&H Academic, 2009.)
- Zondervan Dictionary of Christianity and Science (Zondervan)
- Christianity Contested: Replies to Critics' Toughest Objections. Eugene, OR: Wipf and Stock Publishers. Dec 2024. ISBN 978-1666743258.
- What Would Jesus REALLY Eat? The Biblical Case for Eating Meat. Burlington: Castle Quay Books. 2019. ISBN 978-1988928173.
- Transformed into the Same Image: Constructive Investigations into the Doctrine of Deification. Downers Grove, IL: IVP Academic, An imprint of InterVarsity Press. 2024. ISBN 978-1514009840.
- Ruse, Michael; McGrath, Alister E.; Gordon, Bruce L.; Copan, Paul; Reese, Christopher L. (2021). Three Views on Christianity and Science. Grand Rapids, MI: Zondervan Academic. ISBN 978-0310598541.
- The Naturalness of Belief: New Essays on Theism's Rationality. Lanham: Lexington Books. 2018. ISBN 978-1498579902.
- KJV Apologetics Study Bible. Nashville, Tennessee: Holman Bible Publishers. 2019. ISBN 978-1535934732.
- CSB Apologetics Study Bible. Nashville: B&H Publishing Group. 2017. ISBN 978-1433644092.
- The Kalām Cosmological Argument. Vol. 1. New York: Bloomsbury Academic, an imprint of Bloomsbury Publishing Inc. 2017. ISBN 9781501330803.
- The Kalām Cosmological Argument. Vol. 2. New York: Bloomsbury, Bloomsbury Academic, an imprint of Bloomsbury Publishing Inc. 2018. ISBN 9781501335891.
- Philosophy of Religion: Classic and Contemporary Issues. Malden, MA: Blackwell Pub. 2008. ISBN 978-1405139908.
- Passionate Conviction: Contemporary Discourses on Christian Apologetics. Nashville, Tenn: B & H Academic. 2007. ISBN 978-0805445381.
- The Rationality of Theism. London: Routledge. 2005. ISBN 978-0415263320.
- Who Was Jesus? A Jewish-Christian Dialogue. Louisville, KY: Westminster John Knox Press. 2001. ISBN 978-0664224622.
- Jesus' Resurrection: Fact or Figment?: A Debate Between William Lane Craig & Gerd Lüdemann. Downers Grove, Ill: InterVarsity Press. 2000. ISBN 978-0830815692.
- Craig, William Lane; Crossan, John Dominic; Buckley, William F.; Copan, Paul (1998). Will the Real Jesus Please Stand up? A Debate Between William Lane Craig and John Dominic Crossan. Grand Rapids, Mich: Baker Books. ISBN 978-0801021756.

=== Authored ===
- Is God a Moral Monster?: Making Sense of the Old Testament God. (Grand Rapids: Baker, 2011.)
- When God Goes to Starbucks: A Guide to Everyday Apologetics. (Grand Rapids: Baker, 2008.)
- Loving Wisdom: Christian Philosophy of Religion. (St. Louis: Chalice Press, 2007)
- What Is Truth? Series edited by Danielle DuRant. (Downers Grove, IL: InterVarsity Press, 2007.)
- "How do you know you're not wrong?": Responding to Objections that Leave Christians Speechless. (Grand Rapids: Baker, 2005).
- (Co-authored with William Lane Craig), Creation ex Nihilo: A Biblical, Philosophical, and Scientific Exploration (Grand Rapids: Baker Book House, 2004).
- "That’s Just Your Interpretation": Responding to Skeptics Who Challenge Your Faith (Grand Rapids: Baker, 2001)
- True for You, But Not for Me: Overcoming Objections to Christian Faith (Minneapolis: Bethany House, 2009).
- An Introduction to Biblical Ethics: Walking in the Way of Wisdom. IVP Academic. July 2014. ISBN 978-0-8308-2818-0.
- The Gospel in the Marketplace of Ideas: Paul's Mars Hill Experience for Our Pluralistic World. IVP Academic. July 2014. ISBN 978-0-8308-4043-4.
- Did God Really Command Genocide? Coming to Terms with the Justice of God. Baker Books. Oct 2014.
- A Little Book for New Philosophers. IVP Academic.
- Is Everything Really Relative?. Norcross, GA: RZIM. 1999.
- Is God a Vindictive Bully? Reconciling Portrayals of God in the Old and New Testaments (1st ed.). Grand Rapids: Baker Academic. 2022. ISBN 978-1540964557.
- Is Relativism Absolutely True? Why “Your Truth” and “My Truth” Is False, Selective, and Unlivable. Lafayette, IN: Ratio Christi. 2022.
- Christianity and the War in Ukraine. Lublin, Poland: Christian Open Academy. 2025.
- Origins: Ancient Impact and Modern Implications of Genesis 1-11. New York: Morgan James Publishers. 2018. ISBN 978-1683509509.
