= Charles L. Feinberg =

American biblical scholar and academic (1909–1995)

Charles Lee Feinberg
- Born: June 12, 1909; Pittsburgh, Pennsylvania, U.S.
- Died: August 22, 1995 (aged 86)
- Occupations: Professor of Semitics and Old Testament
- Spouse: Anne Priscilla (nee Fraiman)
- Children: Paul, Lois and John

Academic background
- Education: University of Pittsburgh (BA); Dallas Theological Seminary (ThM, ThD); Southern Methodist University (MA); Johns Hopkins University (PhD)
- Thesis: (1945)

Academic work
- Discipline: Biblical studies
- Sub-discipline: Old Testament studies
- Institutions: Dallas Theological Seminary; Talbot Theological Seminary

Charles Lee Feinberg (June 12, 1909 – August 22, 1995) was an American biblical scholar and professor of Semitics and Old Testament. He was an authority on the Jewish history, languages and customs of the Old Testament and biblical prophecies.

== Background and education ==
Feinberg was born in Pittsburgh, Pennsylvania, and raised in an Orthodox Jewish community, graduating from the Hebrew Institute of Pittsburgh and the University of Pittsburgh in preparation to be a rabbi. In 1930, he converted from Judaism to Protestantism through the ministry of Chosen People Ministries. He went on to earn his Th.M. (1934) and Th.D. (1935) from Dallas Theological Seminary, his A.M. (1943) from Southern Methodist University and his Ph.D. (1945) in Archaeology and Semitic languages from Johns Hopkins University. Feinberg married Anne Priscilla Fraiman in 1935, and together they had three children (Paul, Lois and John).

== Career ==
Feinberg joined the faculty of Dallas Theological Seminary as professor of Old Testament in 1934 and began radio broadcasting messages the following year. During that time, he also served as pastor of a church from 1936 to 1940. In 1948, Feinberg joined the faculty of what would later become Talbot Theological Seminary, and in 1952 became its first and longest-serving dean. He also served as pastor at two Los Angeles churches until 1955. In 1958, he oversaw an update to The Fundamentals, a defense of the central teachings of Christianity, and later was on the team that originally translated the New American Standard Bible.

In 1981, a Festschrift was published in his honor. Tradition and Testament : Essays in Honor of Charles Lee Feinberg included contributions from John F. Walvoord, Bruce K. Waltke, Walter C. Kaiser Jr., and Gleason L. Archer.

== Works ==
=== Books ===
- Feinberg, Charles L. (1947). Hosea: God's love for Israel. Major messages of the Minor Prophets. New York: American Board of Missions to the Jews. OCLC 188793.
- ——— (1950). God Remembers: A Study of Zechariah (1st ed.). Wheaton, IL: Van Kampen Press. OCLC 2867948.
- ——— (1951). Habakkuk: problems of faith. Zephaniah: the day of the Lord. Haggai: rebuilding the temple. Malachi: formal worship. Major messages of the Minor Prophets. New York: American Board of Missions to the Jews. OCLC 188777.
- ——— (1952). Zechariah: Israel's comfort and glory. Major messages of the Minor Prophets. New York: American Board of Missions to the Jews. OCLC 3465344.
- ——— (1954). Premillennialism or Amillennialism? The premillennial and amillennial systems of Biblical interpretation analyzed and compared (2nd enlarged ed.). Wheaton, IL: Van Kampen Press.
- ———, ed. (1958). The Fundamentals for Today. Grand Rapids, MI: Kregel Publications. OCLC 5886368.
- ———, ed. (1964). Focus on Prophecy: messages delivered at the Congress on Prophecy convened by the American Board of Missions to the Jews at the Moody Memorial Church in Chicago. Westwood, NJ: Revell. OCLC 3080229.
- ———, ed. (1968). Prophetic Truth Unfolding Today: messages delivered at the Congress on Prophecy convened by the American Board of Mission[s] to the Jews, inc., in the metropolitan New York area. Westwood, NJ: Revell. OCLC 184035.
- ——— (1969). The Prophecy of Ezekiel: The Glory of the Lord (1st ed.). Chicago, IL: Moody Press. OCLC 72075.
- ———, ed. (1971). Prophecy and the Seventies. Chicago, IL: Moody Press. ISBN 978-0-802-46898-7. OCLC 138668.
- ——— (1975). Israel in the Spotlight. Chicago, IL: Moody Press. ISBN 978-0-802-44178-2. OCLC 1926019.
- ——— (1975). Jesus the King is Coming. Chicago, IL: Moody Press. ISBN 978-0-802-44331-1. OCLC 1205983.
- ——— (1976). The Minor Prophets. Chicago, IL: Moody Press. OCLC 1975342.
- ——— (1979). God Remembers: A Study of Zechariah (Reprint ed.). Portland, OR: Multnomah Press. ISBN 978-0-930-01433-9. OCLC 5708009.
- ——— (1980). Millennialism - The Two Major Views (3rd enlarged ed.). Chicago, IL: Moody Press. ISBN 978-0-802-46815-4. OCLC 6200112. - First-2d ed. published under title: Premillennialism or amillennialism?
- ——— (1980). Israel at the Center of History & Revelation (Reprint ed.). Portland, OR: Multnomah Press. ISBN 978-0-930-01438-4. OCLC 6200173. - previous editions published under title: Israel in the Spotlight
- ——— (1982). Jeremiah: a commentary. Grand Rapids, MI: Zondervan. ISBN 978-0-310-45330-7. OCLC 8727824.
- ———; Torrey, R. A., eds. (1990). The Fundamentals: the famous sourcebook of foundational biblical truths. Grand Rapids, MI: Kregel Publications. ISBN 978-0-8254-2633-9. OCLC 20991703. - Updated ed. of: Fundamentals for Today
- ——— (2003). The Prophecy of Ezekiel: The Glory of the Lord (Reprint ed.). Eugene, OR: Wipf and Stock. ISBN 978-1-5924-4270-6.

=== Articles and chapters ===
- ——— (Jan 1943). "'Old Hundredth' - Psalm C". Bibliotheca Sacra: 53–66.
- ——— (July 1947). "Parallels to the Psalms in Near Eastern Literature". Bibliotheca Sacra. 104: 290–97.
- ——— (Oct 1947). "The Date of the Psalms". Bibliotheca Sacra. 104: 426–40.
- ——— (Jan 1948). "Are There Maccabean Psalms in the Psalter?". Bibliotheca Sacra. 105: 44–55.
- ——— (Apr 1948). "The Uses of the Psalter: Pt. 1". Bibliotheca Sacra. 105: 154–69.
- ——— (Jan 1954). "The Old Testament in Jewish Thought and Life Part 1". Bibliotheca Sacra. 111 (441): 27–38.
- ——— (April 1954). "The Old Testament in Jewish Thought and Life Part 2". Bibliotheca Sacra. 111 (442): 125–136.
- ——— (Oct 1955). "The State of Israel". Bibliotheca Sacra. 112 (448): 311–319.
- ——— (Oct 1958). "The Scapegoat of Leviticus Sixteen". Bibliotheca Sacra. 115 (460): 320–333.
- ——— (July 1959). "The Accuser and the Advocate in Jewish Liturgy". Bibliotheca Sacra. 116 (463): 212–220.
- ——— (Oct 1960). "The Virgin Birth in the Old Testament". Bibliotheca Sacra. 117: 313–324.
- ——— (July 1962). "The Virgin Birth in the Old Testament and Isaiah 7:14". Bibliotheca Sacra. 119: 251–258.

== Festschrift ==
- Feinberg, John S.; Feinberg, Paul D., eds. (1981). Tradition and Testament: Essays in Honor of Charles Lee Feinberg. Chicago, IL: Moody Press. ISBN 978-0-802-42544-7. OCLC 7653379.
