= Evangelical Philosophical Society =

Academic association

- Abbreviation: EPS
- Founded: December 28, 1974; 51 years ago
- Type: Academic association
- Tax ID no.: 33-0197224
- Legal status: 501(c)(3) nonprofit organization
- Purpose: Evangelical Philosophy
- Location: La Mirada, California
- President: Keith Hess
- First President: Norman Geisler
- Publication: Philosophia Christi
- Affiliations: Evangelical Theological Society

The Evangelical Philosophical Society (EPS) is an organization devoted to the study of philosophy, philosophy of religion, philosophical theology, apologetics, and ethics from an evangelical perspective. Membership is open to professional scholars, and associate membership is available to laypersons and students. The current president of the organization is Keith Hess.

== Philosophia Christi ==
Philosophia Christi is a peer-reviewed academic journal published twice a year by the Evangelical Philosophical Society with the support of Biola University as a vehicle for the scholarly discussion of philosophy and philosophical issues as well as philosophy of religion, philosophical theology, and philosophical apologetics. Its editor is Ross Inman.

== History ==
The Evangelical Philosophical Society (EPS) is considered a "sister society" to the Evangelical Theological Society (ETS). EPS was founded in 1974 at Dallas Theological Seminary when a group of scholars from ETS met at the ETS annual meeting in December 1974 to discuss concerns related to philosophy of religion. At this meeting, a steering committee was established to explore the idea of forming a new society to focus on philosophy. EPS was then officially organized at the ETS annual meeting in Philadelphia on December 28, 1976, with Norman Geisler serving as its first president. There were twenty charter members of the EPS. In 1978, EPS began publishing its own journal, the Bulletin of the Evangelical Philosophical Society, which was later renamed Philosophia Christi in 1994.

In 1998, plans were made to restructure the Evangelical Philosophical Society in several ways. Among these was lengthening the term of officers from one to three years and relaunching the EPS journal, Philosophia Christi, starting with "Series 2" in 1999.

== Presidents ==
#	Years	President	Ref
1	1976–1977	Norman Geisler	
2	1977–1978	Gordon R. Lewis	
3	1978–1979	Paul Feinberg	
4	1979–1980	Stanley R. Obitts	
5	1980–1981	John Jefferson Davis	
6	1981-1982	William F. Luck, Sr.	
7	1982–1983	Stephen M. Clinton	
8	1983–1984	Gary Habermas	
9	1984–1985	Winfried Corduan	
10	1985–1986	John Feinberg	
11	1986–1987	Terry L. Miethe	
12	1987–1988	Stephen R. Spencer	
13	1988–1989	L. Russ Bush	
14	1989–1990	Gordon R. Lewis (Note: Second term in office. First term was 1977–1978.)	
15	1990–1991	Millard Erickson	
16	1991–1992	Francis J. Beckwith; R. Douglas Geivett (Note: Beckwith and Geivett both served as presidents for one year in this span, but it cannot be determined from sources which served in which term.)	
17	1992–1993	Francis J. Beckwith; R. Douglas Geivett	
18	1993–1994	Michael Bauman	
19	1994–1995	William Johnson	
20	1995–1996	Donald T. Williams	
21	1996–1997	William Lane Craig	
22	1997–1998 (Note: In prior years, the vice president of the evangelical philosophical society was also the president-elect for the subsequent year. However, due to the restructuring of EPS in 1998, David K. Clark, who served as the vice president of EPS in 1998 and who was set to become president of the EPS in 1999, did not become the president of EPS, although he is anticipatorily listed as such in Philosophia Christi in 1998. As a result of this, Clark was not listed as a past president on the EPS website in 1999.)	W. David Beck	
23	1998–2005 (Note: In 1998, the Evangelical Philosophical Society was restructured and began electing officers for longer terms than just one year.)	William Lane Craig	
24	2005–2012	Paul Copan	
25	2012–2018	Angus Menuge	
26	2018–2024	Michael W. Austin	
27	2024–present	Keith Hess	

== See also ==
- Society of Christian Philosophers
- Evangelical Theological Society
