= Philosophia Christi =

- Discipline: Philosophy, religious studies
- Language: English
- Edited by: Ross D. Inman

Publication details
- Former name: Bulletin of the Evangelical Philosophical Society
- History: 1978–1998 (Series 1); 1999–present (Series 2)
- Publisher: Evangelical Philosophical Society (United States)
- Frequency: Biannually

Standard abbreviations
- ISO 4: Philos. Christi

Indexing
- ISSN: 1529-1634 (print); 2640-2580 (web)
- LCCN: 00213442
- OCLC no.: 41963391

Links
- Journal homepage; Table of contents, 1999-present

Philosophia Christi is a biannual peer-reviewed academic journal published by the Evangelical Philosophical Society with the support of Biola University. It covers philosophical issues in the fields of apologetics, ethics, theology, and religion from an evangelical perspective and publishes articles, philosophical notes, and book reviews. The editor-in-chief is Ross Inman.

The journal is abstracted and indexed by The Philosopher's Index, Religious and Theological Abstracts, the American Theological Library Association, and Index Theologicus. Online access is provided by the Philosophy Documentation Center.

== Editors ==
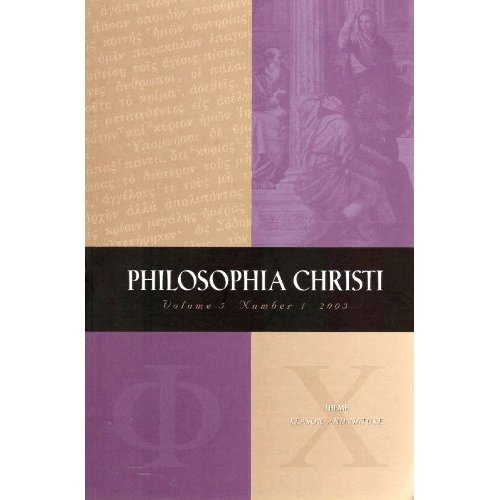
Philosophia Christi cover during the editorship of Craig Hazen

#	Years	Editor	Volumes	Ref
Series 1
1	1978	Norman Geisler	1	
2	1979–1981	Stephen M. Clinton	2–4	
3	1982–1983	John Feinberg	5–6	
	1984–1998	Stephen M. Clinton	7–21	
Series 2
4	1999–2018	Craig J. Hazen	1–20	
5	2019–Present	Ross D. Inman	21–Present	
