= John Feinberg =

American theologian (born 1946)

John Samuel Feinberg
- Born: April 2, 1946 (age 80); Dallas, Texas, U.S.
- Education: University of California, Los Angeles (BA); Talbot Theological Seminary (MDiv); Trinity Evangelical Divinity School (ThM); University of Chicago (MA, PhD)
- Occupations: Theologian; author; professor
- Spouse: Patricia (1972-2025)
- Children: 3

Academic background
- Thesis: Theologies and Evil (1979)
- Doctoral advisor: Alan Donagan
- Other advisors: Warner Wick; Paul Ricoeur

Academic work
- School or tradition: Dispensationalism, Calvinism
- Main interests: Ethics

John Samuel Feinberg (born April 2, 1946) is an American theologian, author, and professor of biblical and systematic theology. He is currently listed as Professor of Biblical and Systematic Theology (retired) at Trinity Evangelical Divinity School in Deerfield, Illinois. He is noted for his expertise in theodicy.

== Background and education ==
Feinberg was born in 1946 to Charles Lee and Anne Priscilla (Fraiman) Feinberg in Dallas, Texas. His family moved from Dallas, Texas to Los Angeles, California in 1948 when his father became the first dean of Talbot Theological Seminary. Feinberg earned his Bachelor of Arts degree in English from the University of California at Los Angeles, his Master of Divinity from Talbot Theological Seminary, his Master of Theology degree (1972) in systematic theology from Trinity, and his Master of Arts (1971) and Doctor of Philosophy (1979) degrees from the University of Chicago.

Feinberg lives in Vernon Hills, Illinois and has three children. His wife Patricia died in 2025. His brother Paul David (1938 - 2004) also taught Systematic Theology and Philosophy of Religion at Trinity Evangelical Divinity School for thirty years.

== Career ==
In his early career, Feinberg served as a missionary in Los Angeles on staff for the American Board of Missions to the Jews. He began his teaching career in 1969 at the Los Angeles Bible Training School in Watts, California. Feinberg was ordained to ministry in 1971 and served as pastor of the Elmwood Park Bible Church in Elmwood Park, Illinois, from 1974 to 1976. He resumed teaching in 1976 at Western Conservative Baptist Seminary in Portland, Oregon, before moving in 1981 to teach at Liberty Baptist Seminary and College in Lynchburg, Virginia. In 1983, he joined the faculty of Trinity Evangelical Divinity School.

During the mid-1980s, Feinberg served on the national membership committee of the Evangelical Theological Society. He also served as editor of the Bulletin of the Evangelical Philosophical Society from 1982 to 1983, and from 1985 to 1986 he served a term as president of the Evangelical Philosophical Society. Since then, he has authored several books and serves as a theological consultant for the academic division of Crossway Books. He serves as general editor for the series Foundations of Evangelical Theology.

In 2015 a Festschrift was published in his honor. Building on the Foundations of Evangelical Theology: Essays in Honor of John S. Feinberg includes contributions from Kevin Vanhoozer, Bruce A. Ware, and Walter Kaiser Jr.

== Selected works ==
=== Books ===
- Feinberg, John S. (1979). Theologies and Evil. Washington, DC: University Press of America. ISBN 978-0-819-10839-5. OCLC 5819758.
- ———; Feinberg, Paul D. (1993). Ethics for a Brave New World. Wheaton, IL: Crossway Books. ISBN 978-1-433-51696-2.
- ——— (1994). The Many Faces of Evil: Theological Systems and the Problem of Evil (1st ed.). Grand Rapids, MI: Zondervan. ISBN 978-1-433-51696-2.
- ——— (1997). Deceived By God?: A Journey Through Suffering. Wheaton, IL: Good News Publishing. ISBN 978-0-891-07886-9.
- ——— (2004). Where Is God: A Personal Story of Finding God in Grief and Suffering (Revised ed.). B&H Publishing. ISBN 978-0-805-43041-7.
- ——— (2004). The Many Faces of Evil: Theological Systems and the Problem of Evil (Revised and expanded ed.). Wheaton, IL: Crossway Books. ISBN 978-1-581-34567-4.
- ——— (2005). No One Like Him: The Doctrine of God. Foundations of Evangelical Theology. Wheaton, IL: Crossway Books. ISBN 978-1-581-34275-8.
- ———; Feinberg, Paul D. (2010). Ethics for a Brave New World (2nd ed.). Wheaton, IL: Crossway Books. ISBN 978-1-58134-712-8.
- ——— (2013). Can you believe it's true?: Christian apologetics in a modern and postmodern era. Wheaton, IL: Crossway Books. ISBN 978-1-433-53900-8. OCLC 821025154.
- ——— (2016). When there are no easy answers: thinking differently about god, suffering and evil, and ... evil. Kregel Publications. ISBN 978-0-825-44412-8. OCLC 923650452.
- ——— (2018). Light in a Dark Place: The Doctrine of Scripture. Wheaton, IL: Crossway Books. ISBN 978-1-4335-3927-5.

=== Edited by ===
- ———; Feinberg, Paul D., eds. (1981). Tradition and Testament: essays in honor of Charles Lee Feinberg. Chicago, IL: Moody Press. ISBN 978-0-802-42544-7. OCLC 7653379.
- ———, ed. (1988). Continuity and Discontinuity: Perspectives on the Relationship Between the Old and New Testaments: Essays in Honor of S. Lewis Johnson, Jr. Wheaton, IL: Crossway Books. ISBN 0-89107-468-6.

=== Chapters ===
- ——— (1986). "God Ordains All Things". In Basinger, David; Basinger, Randall (eds.). Predestination & Free Will: Four Views of Divine Sovereignty & Human Freedom. Spectrum Multiview Book Series. Downers Grove, IL: Inter-Varsity Press. pp. 19–44. ISBN 978-0-877-84567-6. - plus his responses
- ——— (1988). "Systems of Discontinuity". In Feinberg, John S. (ed.). Continuity and Discontinuity: Perspectives on the Relationship Between the Old and New Testaments: Essays in Honor of S. Lewis Johnson, Jr. Wheaton, IL: Crossway Books. ISBN 0-89107-468-6.

=== Articles ===
- ——— (Fall 1989). "Review Article: Rationality, Objectivity, and Doing Theology: Review and Critique of Wentzel Van Huysteen's Theology and the Justification of Faith". Trinity Journal. New Series. 10 (2): 161–184.
- ——— (Fall 1993). "A Baby At Any Cost And By Any Means? The Morality Of In Vitro Fertilization And Frozen Embryos". Trinity Journal. New Series. 14 (2): 143–173.
- ——— (1986). "1 Peter 3:18-20, Ancient Mythology, and the Intermediate State". Westminster Theological Journal. 48 (2): 303–336.

== Festschrift ==
- Wellum, Stephen J.; Allison, Gregg R., eds. (2015). Building on the Foundations of Evangelical Theology. Wheaton, IL: Crossway Books. ISBN 978-1-433-53817-9.
