= Currents in Biblical Research =

Academic journal

- Discipline: Biblical studies
- Language: English
- Edited by: Catherine E. Bonesho, Brad E. Kelle, & Drew Strait

Publication details
- Publisher: SAGE Publications
- Frequency: Triannually

Standard abbreviations
- ISO 4: Curr. Biblic. Res.

Indexing
- ISSN: 1476-993X (print); 1745-5200 (web)
- LCCN: 2003200186
- OCLC no.: 645357170

Links
- Journal homepage; Online access; Online archive

Currents in Biblical Research is a triannual peer-reviewed academic journal that covers the field of biblical studies.

In 2023, associate editors include Catherine E. Bonesho (University of California, Los Angeles) and Annette Yoshiko Reed (Harvard Divinity School). Although the journal's first issue was released in 1993, Currents in Biblical Research began publishing with SAGE Publications in 2002.

== Areas of interest ==
The journal covers recent research on ancient literature, historical studies and archaeology.

== Abstracting and indexing ==
The journal is abstracted and indexed in:

- Academic Search Premier
- ATLA Religion Database
- Index Theologicus
- Religion & Philosophy Collection
- Religious and Theological Abstracts
