= Michael W. Austin =

American philosopher

- Born: 1969 (age 56–57)

Education
- Education: University of Colorado at Boulder (Ph.D.); Talbot School of Theology (M.A.)
- Thesis: Parental Rights and Obligations (2004)
- Doctoral advisor: David Boonin

Philosophical work
- Era: 21st-century philosophy
- Region: Western philosophy
- Institutions: Eastern Kentucky University
- Main interests: philosophy of religion, moral philosophy

Michael W. Austin (born 1969) is an American philosopher and Professor of Philosophy at Eastern Kentucky University. He is known for his works on moral philosophy and philosophy of religion. Austin served as the president of the Evangelical Philosophical Society from 2018 to 2024. He is a founding member of the Jimmy Friggers Spiritual Formation Group.

== Books ==
- Football and Philosophy: Going Deep
- God and Guns in America
- Wise Stewards: Philosophical Foundations of Christian Parenting
- Being Good: Christian Virtues for Everyday Life
- Cycling - Philosophy for Everyone: A Philosophical Tour de Force
- Coffee - Philosophy for Everyone: Grounds for Debate
- Running and Philosophy: A Marathon for the Mind
- Fatherhood - Philosophy for Everyone: The Dao of Daddy
- Conceptions of Parenthood: Ethics and The Family
- Virtues in Action: New Essays in Applied Virtue Ethics
- The Olympics and Philosophy (The Philosophy of Popular Culture)
- Humility and Human Flourishing: A Study in Analytic Moral Theology (Oxford Studies in Analytic Theology)
