= Michael Baumann =

Michael Baumann may refer to:

- Bommi Baumann (Michael Baumann, 1947–2016), German anarchist and writer
- Mike Baumann (born 1995), American baseball pitcher

== See also ==
- Michael Bauman (disambiguation)
