= Tyndale Theological Seminary (Europe) =

- Established: 1985
- President: Gunnar Mägi
- Location: Badhoevedorp, Netherlands; 52.3322°N 4.7935°E
- Campus: Suburban
- Website: tyndale-europe.edu

Tyndale Theological Seminary is an interdenominational Evangelical Christian seminary in Badhoevedorp, The Netherlands.

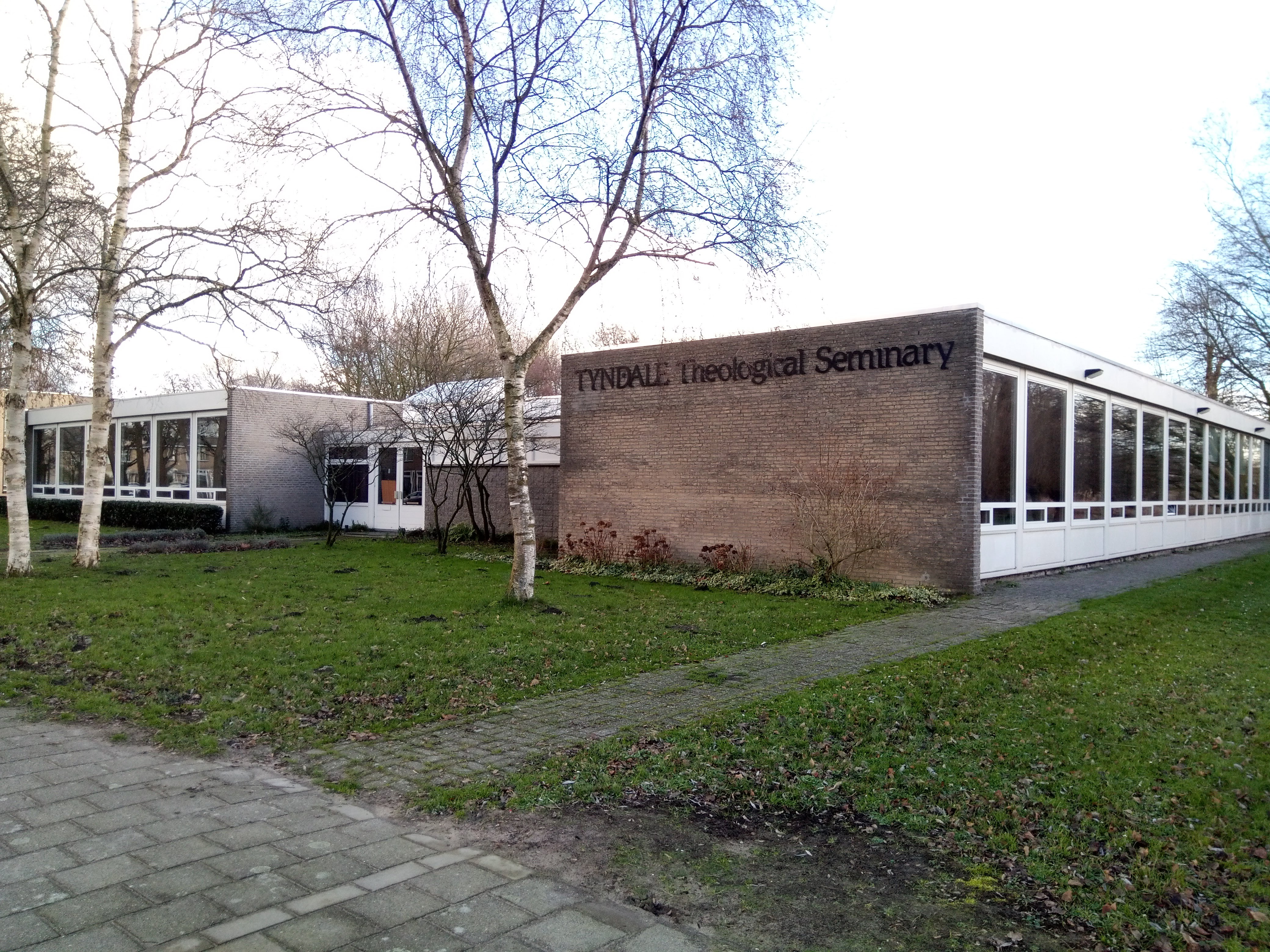
Tyndale Theological Seminary Main Building

== History ==
The school was founded in 1985 by the American organization Greater Europe Mission.

Tyndale prepares students to become pastors, teachers, missionaries and denominational leaders. It is a graduate professional school (Dutch hogerberoepsonderwijs), offering accredited masters programs in the English language.

Tyndale has had students from a number of different countries, including Ghana, Cameroon, Burma, and Ukraine. As of 2010, it had graduated more than 250 students.
