= Michael Bauman (theologian) =

American theologian

Michael Edward Bauman (February 14, 1950 – October 2, 2019) was an American theologian. He served as professor of theology and culture and director of Christian studies at Hillsdale College in Hillsdale, Michigan. He was also a member of the faculty of Summit Ministries, in Manitou Springs, Colorado.

== Early life and education ==
Bauman was born on February 14, 1950, in Moline, Illinois, and graduated from Moline High School. He received his Bachelor of Arts in the Old Testament from Trinity College (now known as Trinity International University) in 1977, a Master of Arts in Church History from McCormick Theological Seminary in 1979. He went on to a PhD in theology from Fordham University, which he completed in 1983, with a dissertation titled Milton's Arianism: "Following The Way Which Is Called Heresy".

== Career ==
After several years as an assistant professor at Northeastern Bible College, Bauman began work at Hillsdale College in 1988. He continued at Hillsdale for the rest of his life, later serving as the director of the Christian Studies program. Between 1989 and 1997, he was associate dean of the summer school at the Centre for Medieval and Renaissance Studies, in Oxford, England.

Bauman wrote or edited more than 20 books, and published more than 50 academic articles on topics spanning theology, politics, history and literature. He also wrote several popular articles on athletics, especially competitive cycling. He was a member of the editorial department of Newsweek magazine for 2½ years and a book review editor for the Journal of the Evangelical Theological Society for 12 years. He was also a president of the Evangelical Philosophical Society.

== Personal life ==
Bauman died on October 2, 2019, following a stroke.

== Selected publications ==
- Milton's Arianism (1986)
- 'A Scripture Index to John Milton's De Doctrina Christiana (1989)
- Roundtable: Conversations With European Theologians (1990)
- Man and Marxism: Religion and the Communist Retreat with Lissa Roche (1991)
- Are You Politically Correct?: Debating America's Cultural Standards with Francis J. Beckwith (1993)
- Historians of the Christian Tradition with Martin Klauber (1995)
- The Creed: Beliefs that Matter (2002)
- Pilgrim Theology: Taking the Path of Theological Discovery (2007)
- Long Walk Home: Life with My Two Fathers, God and Ed (2018)
