= Feminist Theology (journal) =

- Discipline: Theology
- Language: English
- Edited by: Lisa Isherwood, Lillalou Hughes, Beverley Clack

Publication details
- History: 1992 -present
- Publisher: SAGE Publications
- Frequency: Tri-annually
- Impact factor: (2010)

Standard abbreviations
- ISO 4: Fem. Theol.

Indexing
- ISSN: 0966-7350

Links
- Journal homepage; Online access; Online archive

Feminist Theology is a peer-reviewed academic journal that publishes papers four times a year in the field of Theology. The journal's editors are Lisa Isherwood (University of Winchester), Lillalou Hughes, Beverley Clack (Westminster Institute of Education) and Janet Wootton. It has been in publication since 1992 and is published by SAGE Publications in association with the Britain and Ireland School of Feminist Theology (BISFT).

== Scope ==
Feminist Theology, whilst academic in its orientation, aims to be seen as accessible to a wide range of readers, whether theologically trained or not. The journal provides a forum for the discussion of contemporary issues in a practical perspective.

== Abstracting and indexing ==
Feminist Theory is abstracted and indexed in the following databases:

- ATLA Religion Database
- Index Theologicus
- New Testament Abstracts
- Religion & Philosophy Collection
- SCOPUS
