= Viator (journal) =

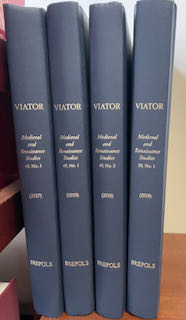
- Discipline: Literature, history, medieval studies
- Language: English
- Edited by: Matthew Fisher

Publication details
- History: 1971-present
- Publisher: Brepols (Belgium)
- Frequency: Biannual

Standard abbreviations
- ISO 4: Viator

Indexing
- ISSN: 0083-5897 (print); 2031-0234 (web)
- OCLC no.: 1769080

Links
- Journal homepage; Online access

Viator is an academic peer-reviewed journal published by Brepols for the University of California, Los Angeles. It publishes scholarly articles on medieval and Renaissance studies, and increasingly focuses on articles addressing topics from late antiquity to early modernity. Founded in 1971 by Lynn Townsend White Jr., the journal published its 50th volume in 2020. In 2021, Viator adopted a new mission statement and assembled a new External Editorial Board. Also in 2021, longstanding editor Henry A. Kelly stepped down from his position.

The journal is housed at UCLA's CMRS Center for Early Global Studies.

Viator published a special issue in 2011, Medieval manuscripts, their makers and users : a special issue of Viator in honor of Richard and Mary Rouse, edited by Christopher Baswell (ISBN 9782503538945).
