= Index Theologicus =

International open access bibliography

The Index Theologicus (IxTheo) is an international scientific open access bibliography for theology and religious studies.

It covers scientifically relevant information on Christianity as well as on dialog with other religions from all confessions, in several languages and media types and throughout history. Publishers are the University Library of Tübingen, the Faculty of Protestant Theology and the Faculty of Roman-Catholic Theology, University of Tübingen.

== History ==
Its predecessor, the Zeitschrifteninhaltsdienst Theologie ("Theology Journals Content Service") or ZID, was started in 1975. This was a current content service which reprinted the table of contents of the main theology journals; monthly ZID issues included an index of authors, Biblical references and persons, which were later combined in an annual and a five-year index.

In 1994-1995, the ZID was converted into a database using allegro-C (a library software developed by the Library of the University of Braunschweig); the bibliographic data extracted from the journals was now stored electronically before it was published in the ZID issues, and the data which had been published in the prior ZID issues was retrospectively catalogued. In addition to subject indexing with standardized index terms, a faceted classification with 130 classes was introduced at that time.

The database itself was made available to the public in German first on floppy disks, later on CD-ROM. Starting in 2001, the subject headings and the user interface were also translated into English.

At the end of 2000, the ZID ceased the publication of its print version. The name of the database was changed to Index Theologicus in 2002, when the publishing house Mohr Siebeck started managing its distribution. Since 2007, the database is only available online and free of charge.

== Features ==
As of July 2022, IxTheo comprised over 4 million records on theological literature (including monographs and articles), and about 15,000 records are added each year. Subject headings and search capabilities are provided in 9 languages: English, German, French, Italian, Spanish, Portuguese, Greek, Russian and Chinese. A special search capability for specific Bible passages using standard abbreviations is also available.

The faceted classification (named "IxTheo classification") now comprises 139 classes divided into 13 main groups.

Since 2013, IxTheo uses the database of the regional cataloguing network "Südwestdeutscher Bibliotheksverbund" (SWB, in south-western Germany), which is shared i.a. by the theological faculties of Tübingen, Heidelberg and Freiburg. The data from the former allegro-c database (over 500,000 records) was migrated into the SWB catalog in 2016.

Since 2015, IxTheo has been managed and further developed by the "Fachinformationsdienst/FID Theologie" (a "specialised information service" in theology) thanks to grants from the German Research Foundation ("Deutsche Forschungsgemeinschaft" or DFG).

IxTheo is implemented as a faceted Discovery System built on the VuFind library search engine. A growing number of journals are processed using semi-automated production procedures with software such as Imageware and Zotero.

== Services ==
In addition to the standard search capabilities for theological literature (including articles, monographs, databases, reviews and internet links), IxTheo offers the following services:

- Hosting of open access publications through Open Journal Systems.
- Digital repository for article reprints.
- Patron-driven acquisition.
- Personalized search queries.
- Bible passage search
- Full-text search

== Partnerships ==
IxTheo has partnerships with a number of libraries, bibliographic tools and publishing houses:

- The Faculty of Catholic Theology at the University of Innsbruck and its bibliographic tools BILDI (Biblical studies), KALDI (Canon law) and MIMESIS (on René Girard's mimetic theory).
- The Institute of Canon Law ("Institut für kanonisches Recht", IKR) at the University of Münster and its database DaKaR.
- The Augustine Research Center ("Zentrum für Augustinusforschung") at the University of Würzburg.
- The publishing houses Walter de Gruyter and Brill Publishers provide the metadata of their journals to IxTheo for cataloguing purposes.
- The publishing house Mohr Siebeck cooperates with IxTheo to facilitate searches in their publications.
- The European Academy of Religion (EUuARe) cooperates with IxTheo in the field of Open Access publishing and public relations.
