= Conversions of Jews to Christianity =

There is a long history of Jewish conversion to Christianity, including both voluntary and forced conversion. Voluntary conversion stems from the Christian mission to Jews, evangelism among Jews, or proselytism to Jews, which is a subset of Christian missionary activities. This contrasts with forced conversion.

== Roman Empire ==
Christianity emerged in Roman Judea during the late Second Temple period (first century AD), and the earliest Christians were Jews. These early Christians of Jewish origin fell into two groups: those who observed the Jewish law and those "who felt themselves to be released from ordinances" like Paul. The term Jewish Christians is often reserved for the first group to distinguish those who continued Jewish practice while believing Jesus to be the prophesied Messiah.

=== Early Christianity ===
The Gospels record that Jesus focused on preaching and teaching among the Jews in Judea and Galilee. Although he briefly visited Samaria to speak with Samaritans (John 4), he largely avoided ministering to Gentiles. In one encounter with a Gentile woman, he said, "I was sent only to the lost sheep of the house of Israel" (Mt 15:24). To be sure, the Gospel of Matthew and the Acts of the Apostles record Jesus commissioning his followers to take his message beyond the confines of Judea after his resurrection (Mt 28:18-20; Acts 1:8).

After Jesus's crucifixion, the focus of Christianity shifted as Gentiles were often more receptive to their message than fellow Jews. Joel Marcus writes, "As these fellow Jews came, for the most part, to reject the Christian message, while Gentiles proved astonishingly receptive to it, a problem surfaced that had not arisen before – did Gentile believers in Jesus need to convert to Judaism?" This question was debated among early Christians, and the debates would constitute some of Christianity's earliest writings.

Apostles Peter and James were two early leaders of the Christianity who preached belief in Jesus and observance of Jewish law. The first recorded sermon by one of Jesus's apostles is by Peter, speaking to fellow Jews in Jerusalem. The themes of Peter's message (see kerygma) included the death and resurrection of Jesus, the fulfillment of biblical prophecy, and the need for his Jewish audience to repent, be baptized, and believe in Jesus for the forgiveness of sins (Acts 2:14-36).

Acts states that three thousand Jews joined the Jesus movement as a result of Peter's preaching (Acts 2:41). This number expanded to five thousand Jewish men shortly thereafter (Acts 4:4). Eventually, James, brother of Jesus, became the leader of the Jerusalem congregation (Acts 21:17), which continued to grow through the preaching of the apostles. Around 57 CE, Acts reports that the Jerusalem congregation included at least Jewish 20,000 members (Acts 21:20, Greek: μυριάδες, myriades), likely as a result of mission activity.

Jerusalem was familiar territory to the apostles, but soon they expanded their mission beyond Judea. It is often noted that Peter was entrusted with going on missions to Jews, and Paul of Tarsus was entrusted with going on missions to Gentiles (Gal 2:9). Indeed, Peter addressed one of his letters to the Jewish diaspora (1 Pe 1:1), and Paul emphasized Gentile missions throughout the Roman world.

Paul continued to preach about Jesus to Jewish people throughout the diaspora (Acts 17-19); however, his message differed from that of Jewish Christians. Marcus writes, "Frequently throughout his ministry, then, Paul encountered Law-observant Jewish Christians, sometimes of a zealous and proselytising sort, and much of his surviving correspondence is an attempt to refute their insistence that Christians need to observe the Law."

Commenting on Romans 1:16, Douglas Moo writes, "However much the church may seem to be dominated by Gentiles, Paul insists that the promises of God realized in the gospel are 'first of all' for the Jew. To Israel the promises were first given, and to the Jews they still particularly apply. Without in any way subtracting from the equal access that all people now have to the gospel, then, Paul insists that the gospel, 'promised beforehand … in the holy Scriptures' (1:2), has a special relevance to the Jew." According to Acts, Paul illustrated this continued commitment to Jewish mission by preaching in synagogues and reasoning with Jewish people about Jesus's death and resurrection (Acts 17:2-3). He conveyed his deep desire that the Jewish people would believe in Jesus (Rom 9:1-5, 10:1), and exhorted his readers to send preachers to share the message of Jesus to the Jewish people (Rom 10:15-17).

After the close of the New Testament, Christian missions to Jews continued to exist. An important second century source is the Dialogue with Trypho of Justin Martyr (c.140) which may be partially fictionalized, and "Trypho" may be a cypher for rabbi Tarfon but otherwise shows a level playing field and mutual respect as each participant appeals to the other. Many Church Fathers contributed treatises for the purpose of Jewish mission, as surveyed by A. Lukyn Williams.

Despite the prominence of Jewish Christianity alongside Pauline (or Gentile) Christianity for a few centuries, Pauline Christianity would come to dominate the Christian world in the wake of the Jewish-Roman wars. Marcus writes, "the first of these wars not only destroyed the temple, a unifying force for all Jews, including Jewish Christians, but it also devastated Jerusalem, the birthplace of Torah-observant Jewish Christianity." Jewish leadership shifted towards the rabbis, and Rabbinic Judaism "sought to define the parameters of acceptable Jewish thought and practice" to the exclusion of Christian Jews. "For all these reasons," Marcus writes, "the outreach of Christian Jews to their co-religionists became less and less effective over time." This was part of a larger historical process shaped by multiple factors resulting in an eventual split between Jewish and Christian practice.

=== After Constantine ===
Emperor Constantine I brought about the end of state persecution of Christians—"imperial hostility had turned into enthusiastic support"—and the position of Christians to Jews changed. Some laws were instituted which protected the rights of Jewish converts from disinheritance, other laws also protected from abuse of the privileges of conversion from those who converted from Judaism "only for a cancellation of debt;" which suggests that in some areas of the empire local incentives to conversion existed. Accounts of conversion itself are not mentioned in rabbinical sources and are not frequent in Christian sources - excepting Epiphanius of Salamis' account of the conversion of Count Joseph of Tiberias, and Sozomen's accounts of Jewish conversions in Constantinople.

== Middle Ages ==
During the medieval period, conversions in Christian ruled lands were frequently conducted by force.

Forced conversions of Jews were carried out with support of rulers during Late Antiquity and the early Middle Ages in Gaul, the Iberian Peninsula and in the Byzantine Empire.

Royal persecutions of Jews from the late eleventh century onward generally took form of expulsions, with some exceptions, such as conversions of Jews in southern Italy of the 13th century, which were carried out by Dominican Inquisitors but instigated by King Charles II of Naples.

Jews were forced to convert to Catholicism before and during the First Crusade by the Crusaders in Lorraine, on the Lower Rhine, in Bavaria and Bohemia, in Mainz and in Worms.

=== Conversos and Marranos in the Iberian Peninsula ===
The Spanish Inquisition began in 1478 by the edict of King Ferdinand II of Aragon and Queen Isabella I of Castile and lasted until 1834. It began toward the end of the Reconquista and aimed to maintain Catholic orthodoxy. There were many converted Jews in Spain due to Catholic persecution. For example, over a hundred thousand of Spain's Jews converted to Catholicism as a result of pogroms in 1391.

In 1492, the Alhambra Decree was issued, ordering the expulsion of unconverted Jews from the Crowns of Castile and Aragon and its territories and possessions. This increased the number of conversos, Jews who were converted by force, and Marranos, Jews who voluntarily converted or were converted by force but continued to practice Judaism in secret in Spain. In Muslim lands, dialogue between Jews and Christians was more equal, and Jewish apologists were able to openly argue against Christianity. In Christian lands, those such as Hasdai Crescas (c.1340–1411) could only write arguments against Christian beliefs at great risk to themselves.

Those remaining practicing Jews were expelled by the Catholic monarchs Ferdinand and Isabella in the Alhambra Decree in 1492, following the Catholic Reconquest of Spain. As a result of the Alhambra Decree and persecution in prior years, over 200,000 Jews converted to Catholicism and between 40,000 and 100,000 were expelled.

Meanwhile, in Portugal, although an order for their expulsion was given in 1496, only a handful were allowed to leave, the rest being forced to convert.

== Early Modern Period ==
In Europe, the Reformation did not immediately give rise to increased proselytism to Jews, in part, this was due to Luther's antisemitism and Calvin's indifference.

=== Eastern Europe ===
Between 1648 and 1649, a large-scale uprising of Cossacks and Ukrainian peasants led by Bohdan Khmelnytsky swept through the Polish–Lithuanian Commonwealth, the area of today's Ukraine. In the course of the fighting, there were many Jewish casualties, and many Jewish communities were destroyed. A large number also converted to Eastern Orthodoxy.

In the 18th century, Elizabeth of Russia launched a campaign of forced conversion of Russia's non-Orthodox subjects, including Muslims and Jews.

Also, in the second half of the 18th century, a mass conversion to Catholicism occurred by followers of Jacob Frank.

== Modern Era ==
=== British proselytization ===
In 1809, Joseph Frey (born Joseph Levi), founded the London Society for Promoting Christianity Amongst the Jews after disagreements developed between him and the generic London Missionary Society. Frey's organization was the first of its kind and its founding marked the dawn of a new period of missions to the Jews. Later, the London Society was renamed the London Jews' Society and later, it was renamed the Church's Ministry Among Jewish People. Its missionaries included Alexander McCaul, the author of The Old Paths, and the grammarian C. W. H. Pauli (born Zebi Nasi Hirsch Prinz). After Frey's group, which was largely led by converted Jews, the generic missionary organisations also attempted more culturally sensitive efforts and in 1841 the Church of Scotland appointed a Gentile missionary, John Duncan to the Jews of the Austro-Hungarian Empire, to be based in Budapest. At the same time "John Nicolayson" (the Dane Hans Nicolajsen), bishop Michael Solomon Alexander, and other missionaries were sent to Palestine. Responses came such as Louis Stern's Anti-Jewish Conversionist Society of Birmingham. David Ruderman has provided a survey of the London Society's work in the 19th century in his study on Alexander McCaul.

A comprehensive book about 19th century Jewish missions was written by Albert Edward Thompson in 1902. In his introduction to the work, William Blackstone wrote, "The Church is slowly awakening to a sense of her obligation and privilege as the custodian of the Jewish oracles, and the herald of the Jewish Messiah, to include this nation [Jews] in her missionary enterprises. Much has been attempted and more is being planned." Thompson provided detailed accounting of all the Jewish missions then known in the United States, the British Isles, continental Europe, Africa, Asia, and Australia, totalling 90 missions around the globe.

Although forced conversions were less common in the 20th century, missionary activity remained strong, and many Jews chose to convert in order to integrate into secular society. A critical period in Britain followed when many of the chief Sephardic families — including the Bernals, Furtados, Ricardos, Disraelis (most prominently, Benjamin Disraeli twice prime minister of the United Kingdom), Ximenes, Lopezs and Uzziellis joined the church.

=== Germany ===
Germany had three main periods of conversion, the first beginning with the Mendelssohnian era (see the Haskalah, the Jewish Enlightenment) and a second wave occurred during the first half of the 19th century. A list of 32 Jewish families and 18 unmarried Jews who had recently converted was given by David Friedlander to Prussian State Chancellor Hardenberg in 1811. In the eight old Prussian provinces between the years of 1816–43, during the reign of Frederick William III., 3,984 Jews were baptized, among them the many of richest and most cultured (2,200 from 1822 to 1840, according to the Jewish Encyclopedia). The third and longest period of secession was due to antisemitism, and began in the year 1880. Across the German states, with the exception of Austria and France, many Jews obtained high stations and large revenues in return for their renouncing Judaism.

=== Russia ===
In Russia, 40,000 are believed to have been converted between 1836 and 1875. while in Britain during that period, the number has been estimated at 50,000.

According to a 2012 study 17% of Jews in Russia identify themselves as Christians.

=== To Catholicism ===
Various estimates have been put forward as to the total number of conversions during the 19th century. One Catholic encyclopedia writes that the number exceeded 100,000; while the Jewish Encyclopedia records approximately 190,000. Other contemporary sources put the number at 130,000 or even as many as 250,000.

As a result of the high rate of conversion, many Catholics can be found with a measure of Jewish parentage. In 1930s Germany, Nazi officials discovered that the German Catholic population with some level of Jewish ancestry almost equalled that of the Jewish community of just over five hundred thousand.

=== Shifts in the early 20th century ===
Early 20th century Jewish missions built upon the growth of the 19th century, with England, the United States, and continental Europe serving as major missions hubs. The largest English mission was the London Society, and the largest American mission was the American Board of Missions to the Jews. These two missions, among many others, were highly involved in continental Europe and Ottoman Palestine (later, the British Mandate).

In his thesis which was titled, "A Survey of Missions to the Jews in Continental Europe, 1900-1950," Mitchell Leslie Glaser divided his study into three periods:

- The period prior to World War I (1900-1914): "In the midst of widespread geographic redistribution of the Jewish people, missions to the Jews flourished until the First World War."
- The period between the wars (1918-1939): "Missions recovered from the destruction of World War I and entered a period of resurgence."
- World War II and the immediate post war period (1939–50): "Undercurrents of lessened commitment to Jewish evangelization were already surfacing before the end of the war, but missions to the Jews, particularly in Europe, were decimated along with the Jewish population. In general, missions to the Jews declined during this period because of the Holocaust and the theological shifts within the mainline sending churches and the national churches of Continental Europe."

== After the Second World War ==
With the decimation of European missions, and with the disappearance of Jewish populations in Europe as a result of the Holocaust, the center of post-World War II missions shifted from Europe to Britain and the United States.

=== United States ===
The American Board of Missions to the Jews (ABMJ), not attached to any denomination, survived the wider decline in Jewish missions and arose to become the largest Jewish mission in the postwar era. The ABMJ pioneered new ministry strategies which included radio broadcasts, television specials, and newspaper ad campaigns. One of the ABMJ's missionaries was Moishe Rosen, who established the San Francisco branch of the ABMJ in the early 1970s. Rosen ended his relationship with the mission because he did not like its methodology, and in 1973, he transformed the San Francisco branch of the mission into a new organization, Jews for Jesus. Jews for Jesus' focus on street evangelism and media campaigns brought it into the national spotlight, and it rapidly grew and eventually became the largest and most influential Jewish mission of the late 20th century. In 1984, the ABMJ changed its name to Chosen People Ministries.

In the 21st century, Jews for Jesus and Chosen People Ministries operate in dozens of American cities and they also operate throughout the world. Other prominent Jewish missions include the Church's Ministry Among Jewish People, Life in Messiah, Friends of Israel Gospel Ministry, the International Board of Jewish Missions, and CJF Ministries. The Lausanne Consultation on Jewish Evangelism, founded in 1980, serves as an international society for Jewish missions to network, share resources, and minister together.

Today, according to 2013 data from the Pew Research Center, about 1.6 million adult American Jews identify themselves as Christians, most of them Protestant. Of those, most were raised as Jews or are Jews by ancestry. According to a 2020 study by the Pew Research Center, 19% of those who say they were raised Jewish in the United States, consider themselves Christian.

== Jewish responses ==
Initial Jewish responses to Christian activity are documented in reports (through Christian eyes) of the response of the priestly authorities in the Book of Acts, through mentions of Jesus in the Talmud, then they are documented in rabbinical texts, such as those which are cited by Steven T. Katz in The Rabbinic Response to Christianity (2006).

During the Middle Ages, rabbinical scholars combated missionary activities with works such as Ibn Shaprut's Touchstone. In modern times, Jews for Judaism and other organizations were founded in response to the activities of organizations such as Moishe Rosen's Jews for Jesus.

== See also ==
- Conversion of the Jews (future event)
