= We have become a grandmother =

1989 quotation by Margaret Thatcher

- Remarks on becoming a grandmother
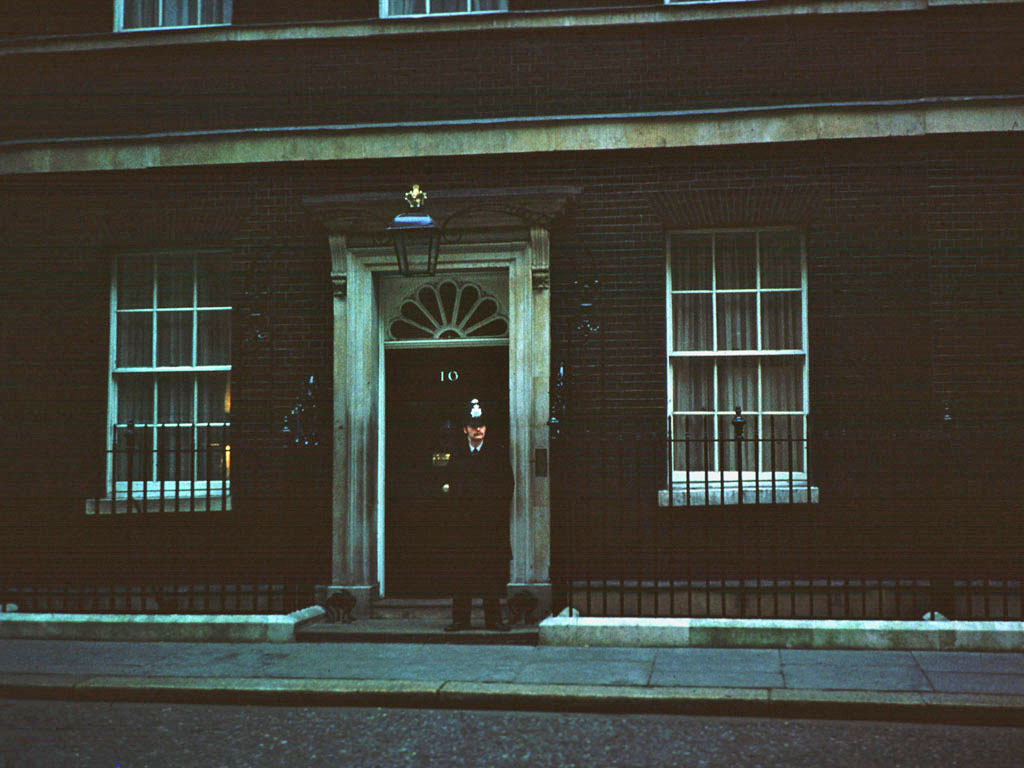
- Entrance to 10 Downing Street in 1977
- Statement outside No. 10 on YouTube

"We have become a grandmother" was a phrase uttered by Margaret Thatcher, Prime Minister of the United Kingdom, in 1989. It has attracted notoriety for her unconventional usage of the royal we. (Note: However, that interpretation may be mistaken as Thatcher had trained herself systematically to use the first person plural when speaking of herself. The apparent intention was to counter the accusation that she made too many government decisions unilaterally, denying her cabinet a say. To imply that, "The cabinet and I have become a grandmother" would still have been a notable gaffe.)

Thatcher made the remark on 3 March 1989 following the birth of her first grandchild, Michael Thatcher, the child of her son Mark Thatcher and his wife Diane Burgdorf. Thatcher made the statement to press gathered outside 10 Downing Street. Dean Palmer, in his 2015 book The Queen and Mrs Thatcher, wrote that Thatcher emerged from Downing Street at "great speed" and that she was dressed in "oversized" pearl earrings, a purple coat trimmed with fur and "blonde hair as rigid as fibreglass".

Her grandson was born close to the tenth anniversary of the start of Thatcher's premiership. The academic Heather Nunn wrote in her 2002 book Thatcher, Politics and Fantasy that the birth of Michael showed that "As a grandmother her maternal credentials were extended a generation to fuel [her] political vision for the next twenty years".

Thatcher's Downing Street press secretary, Bernard Ingham, wrote in his diary that he would "never live down" the incident, as prime ministers are "thought to be intensively rehearsed before they utter a word to the world", but that the incident "add[ed] to the gaiety of the nation".

== Use of the royal we ==
In the United Kingdom, the usage of the royal we is typically restricted to the monarch.

Thatcher's biographer, Charles Moore, after noting that the public interpreted the usage as an example of Thatcher's "pseudo-royal grandiosity", offered different explanations: that she had always had a perpetual embarrassment with using the word "I" to describe herself, and that perhaps she had been trying to include her husband, Denis, in her statement but made a simple slip of the tongue: the intended statement may have been "we have become grandparents", rather than "a grandmother".

Dean Palmer felt Thatcher's use of the royal we showed how it "seemed to the world" that Thatcher was losing touch with reality. The sociologist Louise Hadley wrote in her 2014 book Responding to Margaret Thatcher's Death that her use of the we "seemed to include the public in the celebration, breaking down the distinction between public and private".

The Churchill Archives Centre, holders of Thatcher's papers, describe the comment as having caused a "huge negative public reaction" to its use by a prime minister, as opposed to a member of the royal family, coupled with Thatcher's "imperious personal manner" was "the source of considerable disdain at the time".

== See also ==
- Personal pronoun
