= C. W. H. Pauli =

Convert to Anglicanism from Judaism

Zebi Nasi Hirsch Prinz (Hebrew Tzvi Nassi) in German Heinrich Prinz, and later Rev. Christian William Henry Pauli (11 August 1800, in Breslau – 4 May 1877, in Amsterdam) was a convert to Christianity, missionary for the London Jewish mission, and Hebrew grammarian.

He was born as the youngest of six children, and orphaned at 14. Although he is referred to as "Rabbi Tzvi Nassi" in some Messianic Jewish reprints of his proof of the Trinity from the Zohar, there is no indication that he was ever a rabbi. At the age of 21 he published in German, under the name Heinrich Prinz Sermons for pious Israelites. He was converted by L. A. Petri.

In England as Rev. Christian William Henry Pauli he became a missionary for the London Society for promoting Christianity among the Jews of Joseph Frey, first in Berlin, then at Amsterdam. In 1839 as C. W. H. Pauli he published Analecta Hebraica, a Hebrew grammar.

In 1844 as Rev. Christiaan Wilhelm Hirsch Pauli he moved to the Netherlands, Zion's Chapel where he worked for 30 years. In 1844 he reported on an outrage committed on the Jews at Weesp, near Amsterdam.

== Works ==
- 1824 Heinrich Prinz Predigten für fromme Israeliten zur Erbauung und zur wahren Aufklärung in Sachen Gottes. in Jahrbücher der Theologie und theologischer Nachrichten, Volume 2 Friedrich Heinrich Christian Schwarz
- 1839 Christian William Henry Pauli Analecta Hebraica Oxford 1839
- 1871 The Chaldee Paraphrase on the Prophet Isaiah of Jonathan ben Uzziel translated by C.W.H. Pauli. - Targum Isaiah.
- 1863 The Great Mystery, or How can Three be One (London, 1863) - an endeavour to prove the doctrine of the Trinity from the Zohar, in which he made further critical comments against Gesenius including that he had misunderstood the grammar and perpetuated a hoax concerning the pluralis excellentiae of Elohim.
