= Elohim =

Word for deity or deities in the Hebrew Bible

Elohim in Hebrew script. The letters are, right-to-left: aleph-lamed-he-yud-mem.

Elohim (Hebrew: אֱלֹהִים, romanized: ʾĔlōhīm [(ʔ)eloˈ(h)im]) is a Hebrew word meaning "gods" or "godhood". Although the word is plural in form (as an abstract noun referring to the concept of "divinity"), in the Hebrew Bible it most often takes singular verbal or pronominal agreement and refers to a single deity, particularly but not always the God of Judaism. In other verses it takes plural agreement and refers to gods in the plural. It is also the word used for judges.

Morphologically, the word is the plural form of the word אֱלוֹהַּ (Note: Because of the mappiq under the Heh, the patach is pronounced before the Heh.) (ʾĔlōah) and is related to El (אֵל ʾēl). It is cognate to the Ugaritic word ʾ-l-h-m (block script transliteration אלהם (Note: The Proto-Canaanite script is not generally considered to have yet evolved into the Phoenician alphabet (much less into modern block script) by the extinction of the Ugaritic language, (Note: Ugaritic went extinct around the 12th century BCE. Conventionally, inscriptions predating 1050 BCE are considered to be Proto-Canaanite and later ones are considered to be the Phoenician alphabet. The Phoenician alphabet would later evolve into the Imperial Aramaic alphabet, adopted by Jews during the Babylonian exile, ultimately being stylized into block script.) which used its own distinct alphabet, but a transliteration is provided to demonstrate similarity.)), which is used for the pantheon of Canaanite gods, the children of El, and conventionally vocalized as "Elohim". Most uses of the term ʾElohim in the later Hebrew text imply a view that is at least monolatrist at the time of writing, and such usage (in the singular), as a proper title for Deity, is distinct from generic usage as elohim, "gods" (plural, simple noun).

== Grammar and etymology ==
The word Hebrew: אֱלֹהִים, romanized: elohim is the plural of אֱלוֹהַּ (eloah, meaning "god", "diety"). Although the word elohim or 'elohiym (/ʼĕlôhîym/) is a grammatically plural noun, Biblical Hebrew often treats it as singular in, e.g., judges. When referring to the Jewish/Israelite God, Elohim is usually understood to be grammatically singular (i.e., it governs a singular verb or adjective). In Modern Hebrew, it is often referred to in the singular despite the -im ending that denotes plural masculine nouns in Hebrew.

The related nouns eloah (אלוה) and el (אֵל) are used as proper names or as generics, as proper names they are interchangeable with elohim. The term אלוה contains an added heh as third radical to the biconsonantal root. Discussions of the etymology of elohim essentially concern this expansion. An exact cognate outside of Hebrew is found in Ugaritic ʾlhm, the family of El, the creator god and chief deity of the Canaanite pantheon, in Biblical Aramaic ʼĔlāhā and later Syriac Alaha ("God"), and in Arabic ʾilāh ("god, deity") (or Allah as "The [single] God"). "El" (the basis for the extended root ʾlh) is usually derived from a root meaning "to be strong" and/or "to be in front".

Rabbinic scholar Maimonides wrote that Elohim "Divinity" and elohim "gods" are commonly understood to be homonyms. One modern theory suggests that the term elohim originated from changes in the early period of the Semitic languages and the development of Biblical Hebrew. In this view, the Proto-Semitic *ʾilāh- originated as a broken plural of *ʾil-, but was reanalyzed as singular "god" due to the shape of its unsuffixed stem and the possibility of interpreting suffixed forms like *ʾilāh-ū-ka (literally: "your gods") as a polite way of saying "your god"; thus the morphologically plural form elohim would have also been considered a polite way of addressing the singular God of the Israelites.

Another theory, building on an idea by Gesenius, argues that even before Hebrew became a distinct language, the plural elohim had both a plural meaning of "gods" and an abstract meaning of "godhood" or "divinity", much as the plural of "father", avot, can mean either "fathers" or "fatherhood". Elohim then came to be used so frequently in reference to specific deities, both male and female, domestic and foreign (for instance, the goddess of the Sidonians in 1 Kings 11:33), that it came to be concretized from meaning "divinity" to meaning "deity", though still occasionally used adjectivally as "divine".

== Canaanite religion ==
The word el (singular) is a standard term for "god" in Aramaic, paleo-Hebrew, and other related Semitic languages including Ugaritic. The Canaanite pantheon of gods was known as 'ilhm, the Ugaritic equivalent to elohim. For instance, the Ugaritic Baal Cycle mentions "seventy sons of Asherah". Each "son of god" was held to be the originating deity for a particular people (KTU 2 1.4.VI.46).

== Hebrew Bible ==
Elohim occurs frequently throughout the Torah. In some cases (e.g., Exodus 3:4, "Elohim called unto him out of the midst of the bush ..."), it behaves like a singular noun in Hebrew grammar and is then generally understood to denote the single God of Israel. In other cases, elohim acts as an ordinary plural of the word eloah and refers to the polytheistic notion of multiple gods (for example, Exodus 20:3, "You shall have no other gods before me").

The word Elohim occurs more than 2500 times in the Hebrew Bible, with meanings ranging from "gods" in a general sense (as in Exodus 12:12, where it describes "the gods of Egypt"), to specific gods (the frequent references to Yahweh as the "elohim" of Israel), to seraphim, and other supernatural beings, to the spirits of the dead brought up at the behest of King Saul in 1 Samuel 28:13, and even to kings and prophets (e.g., Exodus 4:16). The phrase bene elohim, translated "sons of the Gods", has an exact parallel in Ugaritic and Phoenician texts, referring to the council of the gods.

=== With plural verb ===
In the Hebrew Bible, 1 Samuel 28:13, elohim is used with a plural verb. The witch of Endor tells Saul that she saw elohim ascending (olim עֹלִים, plural verb) out of the earth when she summoned the spirit of the Prophet Samuel at Saul's request. The word elohim, in this context, can refer to spirits as well as deities. Some traditional Jewish sources say that the spirits of deceased human beings are being referred to. The Babylonian Talmud states: "olim indicates that there were two of them. One of them was Samuel, but the other, who was he? – Samuel went and brought Moses with him." Rashi gives this interpretation in his commentary on the verse. Regarding this, Sforno states that "every disembodied creature is known as elohim; this includes the soul of human beings known as [the] 'Image of God'."

In Genesis 20:13, Abraham, before the polytheistic Philistine king Abimelech, says that "Elohim (translated as 'God') caused (התעו, plural verb) me to wander". Whereas the Greek Septuagint (LXX) has a singular verb form (ἐξήγαγε(ν), aorist II), most English versions usually translate this as "God caused" (which does not distinguish between a singular and plural verb). Regarding this, the Jerusalem Talmud states: "All Names written regarding our father Abraham are holy [i.e., referring to the one God] except one which is profane, it was when the gods made me err from my father's house. But some say this one also is holy, [i.e.,] 'were it not for God, they [humans] already would have made me err'." The same disagreement appears in Tractate Soferim, where Haninah ben Ahi R. Joshua maintained that the word is "holy". An alternative view (held by Onkelos, Bahya ben Asher, Jacob ben Asher, Sforno, and Rabbi Yaakov Tzvi Mecklenburg) is that the word means "gods" and the verse means that Abraham's distaste for the idolatry of his father Terah led him to decide to wander far from home. Others, such as Chizkuni, interpret elohim as a reference to wicked rulers like Amraphel (often equated with Nimrod).

In Genesis 35:7, Jacob builds an altar at El-Bethel "because there elohim revealed himself [plural verb] to [Jacob]". The verb niglu ("revealed himself") is plural, even though one would expect the singular. This is one of several instances where the Bible uses plural verbs with the name elohim. Some Jewish sources (e.g., Targum Jonathan, Ibn Ezra, add Chizkuni), seeking to explain the plural language of Genesis 35:7, translate elohim here as "angels", noting that in the story being referenced Jacob experiences a vision of malakhei elohim (angels of God) ascending and descending the ladder. Radak agrees that this is a reference to angels but also presents the alternative view that the plural form in the verse is a majestic plural, as seen in other verses such as Psalms 149:2 and Job 35:10. Elohim can be seen used in reference to the angels in a variety of other cases, such as in Psalms 8:6 and 82:1–6.

=== With singular verb ===
Elohim, when meaning the God of Israel, is mostly grammatically singular, and is commonly translated as "God", and capitalised. For example, in Genesis 1:26, it is written: "Then Elohim (translated as God) said (singular verb), 'Let us (plural) make (plural verb) man in our (plural) image, after our (plural) likeness'". In the traditional Jewish understanding of the verse, the plural refers to God taking council with His angels (who He had created by this point) before creating Adam. It should also be noted that in the following verse of Genesis 1:27: "So God created man in his [own] image, in the image of God He created him; male and female He created them"; the singular verb בָּרָא (bārāʾ), meaning "He created" is used as it is elsewhere in all the acts of creation featured in Genesis. This shows us that the actual creation of man (and everything else) in Genesis was a singular act by God alone.

Wilhelm Gesenius and other Hebrew grammarians traditionally described this as the pluralis excellentiae (plural of excellence), which is similar to the pluralis majestatis (plural of majesty, or "Royal we"). (Note: According to Rabbi Joseph Hertz, the word's use in Genesis 1:1 "indicates that God comprehends and unifies all the forces of eternity and infinity".) Gesenius comments that the singular Hebrew term Elohim is to be distinguished from elohim used to refer to plural gods, and remarks that:

The supposition that אֱלֹהִים (elohim) is to be regarded as merely a remnant of earlier polytheistic views (i.e. as originally only a numerical plural) is at least highly improbable, and, moreover, would not explain the analogous plurals (see below). That the language has entirely rejected the idea of numerical plurality in אֱלֹהִים (whenever it denotes one God), is proved especially by its being almost invariably joined with a singular attribute (cf. §132h), e.g. אֱלֹהִים צַדִּיק Psalms 7:10, &c. Hence אֱלֹהִים may have been used originally not only as a numerical but also as an abstract plural (corresponding to the Latin numen, and our Godhead), and, like other abstracts of the same kind, have been transferred to a concrete single god (even of the heathen).

To the same class (and probably formed on the analogy of אֱלֹהִים) belong the plurals קְדשִׁים (kadoshim), meaning the Most Holy (only of Yahweh, Hosea 12:1, Proverbs 9:10, 30:3 – cf. אֱלֹהִים קְדשִׁים elohiym kadoshim in Joshua 24:19 and the singular Aramaic עֶלְיוֹנִין the Most High, Daniel 7:18, 7:22, 7:25); and probably תְּרָפִים (teraphim) (usually taken in the sense of penates), the image of a god, used especially for obtaining oracles. Certainly in 1 Samuel 19:13, 19:16 only one image is intended; in most other places a single image may be intended; in Zechariah 10:2 alone is it most naturally taken as a numerical plural.

— Gesenius, Wilhelm (1910). "124. The Various Uses of the Plural-form" . In Kautzsch, Emil (ed.). Gesenius' Hebrew Grammar. Translated by Cowley, Arthur Ernest (2nd, revised and enlarged ed.). Oxford University Press. p. 399 – via Wikisource.

There are a number of notable exceptions to the rule that Elohim is treated as singular when referring to the God of Israel, including Genesis 20:13, Genesis 35:7, 2 Samuel 7:23 and Psalms 58:11, and notably the epithet of the "Living God" (Deuteronomy 5:26 etc.), which is constructed with the plural adjective, Elohim ḥayyim (אלהים חיים) but still takes singular verbs. The treatment of Elohim as both singular and plural is, according to Mark Sameth, consistent with a theory put forth by Guillaume Postel (16th century) and Michelangelo Lanci (19th century) that the God of Israel was understood by the ancient priests to be a singular, dual-gendered deity.

In the Septuagint and New Testament translations, Elohim has the singular ὁ θεός even in these cases, and modern translations follow suit in giving "God" in the singular. The Samaritan Torah has edited out some of these exceptions.

=== Angels and judges ===
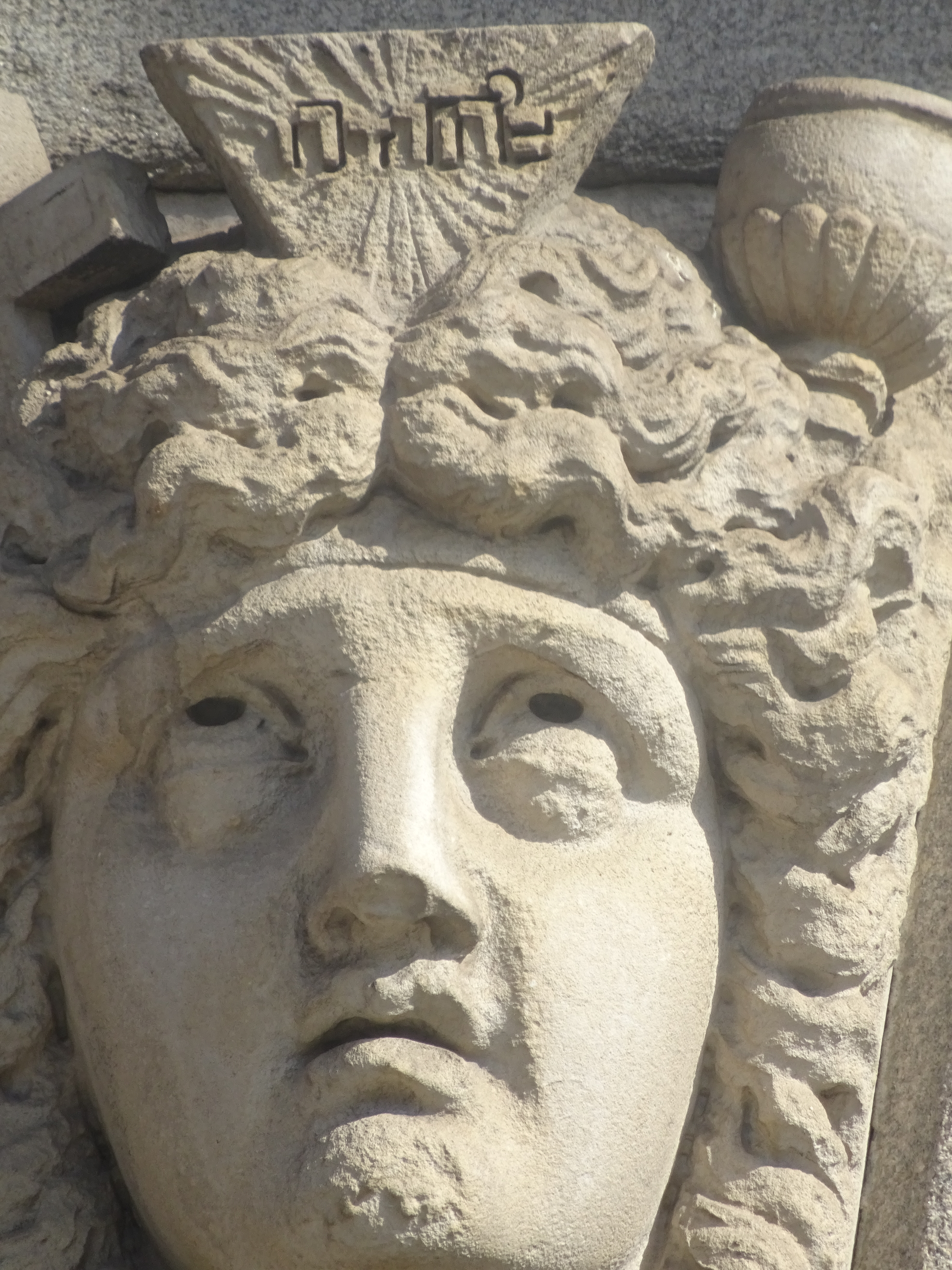
Carved angel's head with Hebrew text "Elohim", from St. George's Church, Dublin.

Elohim occupy the seventh rank of ten in the medieval rabbinic scholar Maimonides' Jewish angelic hierarchy. Maimonides wrote: "I must premise that every Hebrew [now] knows that the term Elohim is a homonym, and denotes God, angels, judges, and the rulers of countries ...".

In a few cases in the Greek Septuagint (LXX), Hebrew elohim with a plural verb, or with implied plural context, was rendered either angeloi ("angels") or to kriterion tou Theou ("the judgement of God"). These passages then entered first the Latin Vulgate, then the English King James Version (KJV) as "angels" and "judges", respectively. From this came the result that James Strong, for example, listed "angels" and "judges" as possible meanings for elohim with a plural verb in his Strong's Concordance, and the same is true of many other 17th–20th century reference works. Both Gesenius' Hebrew Lexicon and the Brown–Driver–Briggs Lexicon list both "angels" and "judges" as possible alternative meanings of elohim with plural verbs and adjectives.

Gesenius and Ernst Wilhelm Hengstenberg have questioned the reliability of the Septuagint translation in this matter. Gesenius lists the meaning without agreeing with it. Hengstenberg stated that the Hebrew Bible text never uses elohim to refer to "angels", but that the Septuagint translators refused the references to "gods" in the verses they amended to "angels". Cyrus H. Gordon extended this critique, arguing that in the ancient Near Eastern context deities could exercise judicial functions, so references to appearing before elohim need not be interpreted as referring to human judges.

The Greek New Testament (NT) quotes Psalms 8:4–6 in Hebrews 2:6b-8a, where the Greek NT has ἀγγέλους (angelous) in vs. 7, quoting Psalms 8:5 (8:6 in the LXX), which also has ἀγγέλους in a version of the Greek Septuagint. In the KJV, elohim (Strong's number H430) is translated as "angels" only in Psalm 8:5.

The KJV translates elohim as "judges" in Exodus 21:6; Exodus 22:8; twice in Exodus 22:9 as "judge" in 1 Samuel 2:25, and as "gods" in Exodus 22:28, Psalm 82:1, Psalm 82:6, Psalm 95:3, Psalm 96:4, Psalm 97:9, and Psalm 138:1.

Earlier Jewish interpretive tradition also rendered elohim in certain juridical contexts as referring to human judges. The Aramaic Targum Onkelos translates elohim as dayyanei (judges) in several passages in Exodus 21–22, including Exodus 21:6 and Exodus 22:8–9. This interpretive approach was followed by some later medieval Jewish commentators, including Rashi, in their exegetical traditions.

Angels cited in the Hebrew Bible and external literature often contain the related noun ʾĒl (אֵל) in their theophoric names such as Michael and Gabriel.

=== Other plural-singulars in biblical Hebrew ===
The Hebrew language has several nouns with -im (masculine plural) and -oth (feminine plural) endings which nevertheless take singular verbs, adjectives and pronouns. For example, Baalim, Adonim, Behemoth. This form is known as the "honorific plural", in which the pluralization is a sign of power or honor. A very common singular Hebrew word with plural ending is the word achoth, meaning sister, with the irregular plural form achioth.

Alternatively, there are several other frequently used words in the Hebrew language that contain a masculine plural ending but also maintain this form in singular concept. The major examples are: Sky/Heavens (שמים shamayim), Face (פנים panim), Life (חיים - chayyim), Water (מים mayim). Of these four nouns, three appear in the first sentence of Genesis (along with elohim). Three of them also appear in the first sentence of the Eden creation story (also along with elohim). Instead of "honorific plural" these other plural nouns terms represent something which is constantly changing. Water, sky, face, life are "things which are never bound to one form".

=== The Divine Council ===
God standeth in the congregation of the mighty; he judgeth among the gods. ...

I have said, Ye [are] gods; and all of you [are] children of the most High.

But ye shall die like men, and fall like one of the princes.

— Psalm 82:1, 6–7 (AV)

Marti Steussy, in Chalice Introduction to the Old Testament, discusses: "The first verse of Psalm 82: 'Elohim has taken his place in the divine council.' Here elohim has a singular verb and clearly refers to God. But in verse 6 of the Psalm, God says to the other members of the council, 'You [plural] are elohim.' Here elohim has to mean gods."

Mark Smith, referring to this same Psalm, states in God in Translation: "This psalm presents a scene of the gods meeting together in divine council ... Elohim stands in the council of El. Among the elohim he pronounces judgment: ..."

In Hulsean Lectures for..., H. M. Stephenson discussed Jesus' argument in John 10:34-36 9 concerning Psalm 82:6-7. (In answer to the charge of blasphemy Jesus replied:) "Is it not written in your law, I said, Ye are gods. If he called them gods, unto whom the word of God came, and the scripture cannot be broken; Say ye of him, whom the Father hath sanctified, and sent into the world, Thou blasphemest; because I said, I am the Son of God?" – "Now what is the force of this quotation 'I said ye are gods.' It is from the Asaph Psalm which begins 'Elohim hath taken His place in the mighty assembly. In the midst of the Elohim He is judging.'"

=== Sons of God ===
The Hebrew word for "son" is ben; plural is bānim (with the construct state form being "benei"). The Hebrew term benei elohim ("sons of God" or "sons of the gods") in Genesis 6:2 compares to the use of "sons of gods" (Ugaritic: b'n il) sons of El in Ugaritic mythology. Karel van der Toorn states that gods can be referred to collectively as bene elim, bene elyon, or bene elohim.

== Elohist ==
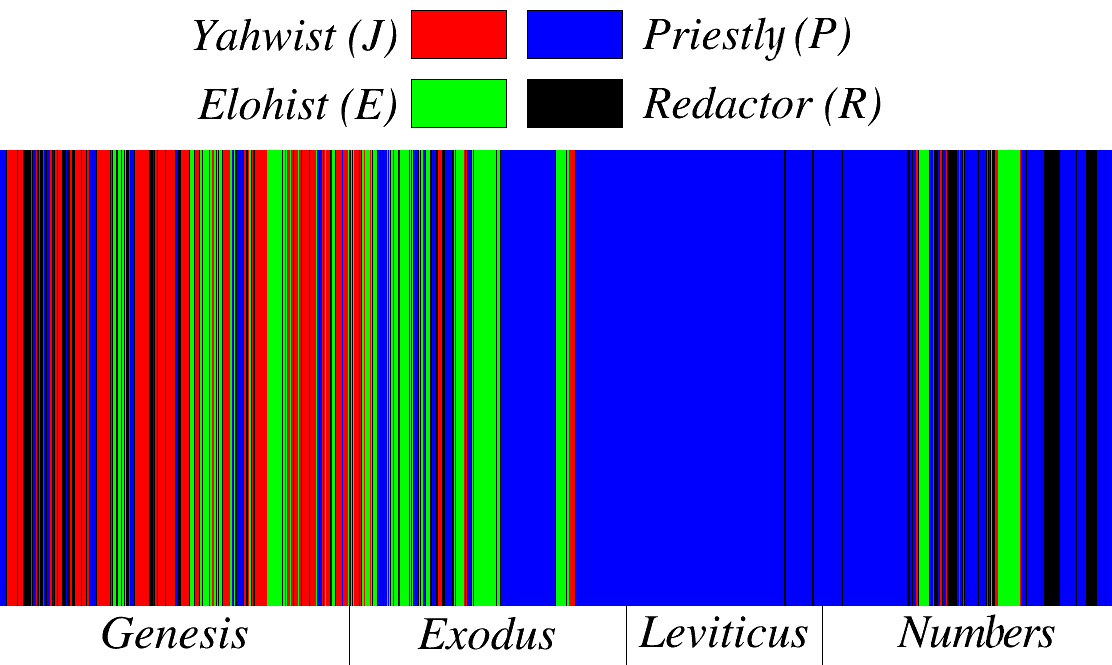
Friedman's distribution of materials by source of the first four books of the Hebrew Bible, including a redactor (black), according to the documentary hypothesis.

The Hebrew Bible uses various names for the God of Israel. According to the documentary hypothesis, these variations are the products of different source texts and narratives that constitute the composition of the Torah: Elohim is the name of God used in the Elohist (E) and Priestly (P) sources, while Yahweh is the name of God used in the Jahwist (J) source. Form criticism postulates the differences of names may be the result of geographical origins; the P and E sources coming from the North and J from the South. There may be a theological point, that God did not reveal his name, Yahweh, before the time of Moses, though Hans Heinrich Schmid showed that the Jahwist was aware of the prophetic books from the 7th and 8th centuries BCE.

The Jahwist source presents Yahweh anthropomorphically: for example, walking through the Garden of Eden looking for Adam and Eve. The Elohist source often presents Elohim as more distant and frequently involves angels, as in the Elohist version of the tale of Jacob's Ladder, in which there is a ladder to the clouds, with angels climbing up and down, with Elohim at the top. In the Jahwist version of the tale, Yahweh is simply stationed in the sky, above the clouds without the ladder or angels. Likewise, the Elohist source describes Jacob wrestling with an angel.

The classical documentary hypothesis, first developed in the late 19th century among biblical scholars and textual critics, holds that the Jahwist portions of the Torah were composed in the 10th-9th century BCE and the Elohist portions in the 9th-8th century BCE, i.e. during the early period of the Kingdom of Judah. This, however, is not universally accepted as later literary scholarship seems to show evidence of a later "Elohist redaction" (post-exilic) during the 5th century BCE which sometimes makes it difficult to determine whether a given passage is "Elohist" in origin, or the result of a later editor.

== Latter Day Saint movement ==
In the Latter Day Saint movement and Mormonism, Elohim refers to God the Father. Elohim is the father of Jesus in both the physical and the spiritual realms, whose name before birth is said to be Jehovah.

In the belief system held by the Christian churches that adhere to the Latter Day Saint movement and most Mormon denominations, including the Church of Jesus Christ of Latter-day Saints (LDS Church), the term God refers to Elohim (the Eternal Father), whereas Godhead means a council of three distinct gods: Elohim (God the Father), Jehovah (the Son of God, Jesus Christ), and the Holy Ghost, in a non-trinitarian conception of the Godhead. In Mormonism, the three persons are considered to be physically separate beings, or personages, but united in will and purpose; this conception differs significantly from mainline Christian trinitarianism. As such, the term Godhead differs from how it is used in mainstream Christianity. This description of God represents the orthodoxy of the LDS Church, established early in the 19th century.

The Book of Abraham, a sacred text accepted by some branches of the Latter Day Saint movement, contains a paraphrase of the first chapter of Genesis which explicitly translates Elohim as "the Gods" multiple times; this is suggested by Mormon apostle James E. Talmage to indicate a "plurality of excellence or intensity, rather than distinctively of number", in contrast to his contemporary apostle Orson F. Whitney's explanation that, while to "the modern Jew [Elohim] means the plural of majesty, not of number...to the Latter-day Saint it signifies both."

== Raëlism ==
The new religious movement and UFO religion International Raëlian Movement, founded by the French journalist Claude Vorilhon (who later became known as "Raël") in 1974, claims that the Hebrew word Elohim from the Book of Genesis actually means "those who came from the sky" and refers to a species of extraterrestrial aliens.

== Gnosticism ==
In the Gnostic text known as the Secret Book of John, Elohim is another name for Abel, whose parents are Eve and Yaldabaoth. He rules over the elements of water and earth, alongside Cain, who is seen as Yahweh ruling over the elements of fire and wind. However, the 2nd century Gnostic teacher Justin proposed a cosmological model with three original divinities. The first is a transcendental being called the Good, the second is Elohim, appearing here as an intermediate male figure, and the third is an Earth-mother called Eden. The world along with the first humans are created from the love between Elohim and Eden, but when Elohim learns about the existence of the Good above him and ascends trying to reach it, he causes evil to enter the universe.

== See also ==
- Allahumma
- Anunnaki
- Elyon
- Genesis creation narrative
- Henotheism § Canaanite religion and Yahwism
- Monolatry § In ancient Israel
- Names of God
- Theophory in the Bible
