= Pluralis excellentiae =

Aspect of Hebrew grammar

The pluralis excellentiae is the name given by early grammarians of the Hebrew language, such as Wilhelm Gesenius, to a perceived anomaly in the grammatical number and syntax in Hebrew. It is distinct from the plural of abstraction. In some cases it bears some similarity to the pluralis maiestatis, or "royal plural". However, the idea of excellence is not necessarily present:

Of (c): the pluralis excellentiae or maiestatis, as has been remarked above, is properly a variety of the abstract plural, since it sums up the several characteristics belonging to the idea, besides possessing the secondary sense of an intensification of the original idea. It is thus closely related to the plurals of amplification, treated under e, which are mostly found in poetry.

— Gesenius' Grammar

Hebrew distinguishes grammatical number by endings in nouns, verbs and adjectives. A grammatical phenomenon occurs with a small number of Hebrew nouns, such as elohim 'great god' and behemoth 'giant beast', whereby a grammatically redundant plural ending (-im, usually masculine plural, or -oth, usually feminine plural) is attached to a noun, but the noun nevertheless continues to take singular verbs and adjectives.

== Abstract plurals with feminine singular ==
Abstract plurals with -im endings such as in words for 'uprightness', 'blessedness', 'sweetness', 'youth', 'strength', etc. take feminine singular verbs and adjectives.

== Behemoth—beasts or great beast ==
Sometimes the normal plural of a noun and the intensive plural are the same. For example behem, 'beast' singular, conjugates with the common feminine plural -oth, and behemoth + plural verb in, for example, the Genesis account of Noah's Ark indicates 'beasts' plural. But in the Book of Job behemoth + singular verb indicates 'giant beast', i.e. the sense of behemoth in English. Leviathan is also intensive: "You crushed the heads of Leviathan. You gave it as food for people, for[?] beasts".

== Intensive plurals with masculine or feminine singular ==
An adjective qualifying a noun in the plural of excellence is more often found in the singular than in the plural. Examples of the singular include

- Deuteronomy 5:23
- 1 Samuel 17:26, 36
- 2 Kings 19:4, 16 Elohim hay 'living God'.
- Psalm 7:10 "a just God"
- Isaiah 19:4 adonim qaseh 'a hard master'
- Isaiah 37:4, 17
- Jeremiah 10:10, 23:36

== Objections ==
Against this are objections such as that of the Hebrew grammarian and Messianic Jewish missionary C. W. H. Pauli (1863) that Gesenius had misunderstood the grammar and perpetuated a hoax. Pauli writes: "Such a pluralis excellentiæ was, however, a thing unknown to Moses and the prophets. ... kings throughout ת״ב״ד, (the Law, the Prophets, and the Hagiographa) speak in the singular, and not as modern kings in the plural. They do not say we, but I, command; as in Gen xli. 41; Dan. iii. 29; Ezra i. 2, etc., etc."

== Other correspondence of number in Hebrew ==
Singular nouns may also take plural adjectives.

== Related grammatical constructs ==
Distinct from the apparent "plural" of nouns with singular verbs is the "plural of deliberation", for "Let us make man in our own image". The plural is usually identified by a -im, -ot, or -ei ending.
