= Hezekiah ben Manoah =

French rabbi and Bible commentator

Hezekiah ben Manoah, or Hezekiah bar Manoah, was a French rabbi and Bible commentator of the 13th century. He is generally known by the title of his commentary, Chizkuni (Hebrew: חזקוני).

In memory of his father, who lost his right hand through his steadfastness in the faith, Hezekiah wrote a commentary on the Pentateuch, under the title Ḥazzeḳuni (ca. 1240). It was printed at Venice in 1524. Other editions appeared at Cremona (1559), Amsterdam (1724, in the Rabbinical Bible of M. Frankfurter), Lemberg (1859), etc.

The commentary is one of the first systematic supercommentaries on the classical commentary of Rashi predating in this field the work of Nachmanides, but it also uses digests and brings selectively quotes and material from about twenty other commentaries as is stated in the introduction. The commentary is based to large extent on the works of Abraham ibn Ezra, Rashbam, Joseph ben Isaac Bekhor Shor and other commentators of the French school. In addition to commentaries and critical analysis and elucidation of Rashi's work, he also contributed original analysis in the form of psychological profiles and historical analysis. The work contains a significant amount of references to Latin biblical terms.

Despite being obviously based on existing material, the author quotes explicitly as his sources only classical Talmudic and Mishanaic sources and Rashi, Dunash ben Labrat, the "Yosippon", and a Sefer haToladot (which may be the work mentioned in the Tosafot's commentary to Leviticus 12:2). Hezekiah stated in his work that the lack of citations was to avoid bias and "glorify the great with the small".
