= Bertrand du Castel =

French-American author and scientist (born 1952)

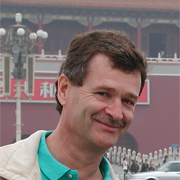
- Du Castel in Beijing in April 2002 during a visit to Peking and Tsinghua universities
- Born: February 8, 1952; France
- Died: February 2019 (aged 66–67)
- Education: University of Paris; Ecole Polytechnique
- Known for: Computer Theology; Java Card; POSC
- Awards: Visionary Award (2005)
- Scientific career
- Fields: Computer science
- Workplaces: Schlumberger

Bertrand du Castel (February 8, 1952 – February 2019) was a French-American author and scientist who won in 2005 the Visionary Award from Card Technology Magazine for pioneering the Java Card, which by 2007 had sold more than 3.5 billion units worldwide. In 2008, du Castel and Timothy M. Jurgensen published Computer Theology: Intelligent Design of the World Wide Web, a theology of the World Wide Web based on a comparative study of human societies and computer networks.

== Biography ==
Du Castel was born in 1952 in France a descendant of Louis-Eugène Cavaignac, who governed France as Prime Minister before being defeated by Napoléon III, and Paul Dubois, whose Joan of Arc sculpture stands in Washington D.C. A graduate of Ecole Polytechnique with a 1977 PhD from the University of Paris in Theoretical Computer Science, he was a Post-Doctoral Fellow at the IBM France Research Center before hiring with Schlumberger in France in 1978. He emigrated to the United States in 1983 where he has lived in Austin, Texas since, becoming an American citizen in 1994.

In 2000, du Castel was invited by the Association for the Advancement of Artificial Intelligence to make a presentation of artificial intelligence advances in the industry that were original to academia. Consequently, du Castel was invited to present at the University of Maryland, Baltimore County (2001), Massachusetts Institute of Technology (2001), University of Texas at Austin (2002), Peking University (2002), Tsinghua University (2002), Purdue University (2002), Grenoble Institute of Technology (2003), University of Paris (2004) and University of Hamburg (2004), which increasingly constituted the matter of a book on the relationship between religion and digital networks.

In 2005 du Castel joined with Timothy M. Jurgensen, author of two books on computer security, to write Computer Theology: Intelligent Design of the World Wide Web, which uses theological principles to study the role of religion in computer networks, and reciprocally studies religion in the light of well-established computer concepts such as trust. The book eventually proposed in 2008 a reference for the field of Computer Theology, following the road traced earlier by Donald Knuth and Anne Foerst, aiming at a better understanding of computer evolution as well as religion.

== Positions ==
- Schlumberger Fellow (2002–)
- Head of Research Axalto (2003–2006)
- Chairman of the Java Card Forum Technical Committee (1997–2006)
- Director and vice-chairman of the Petrotechnical Open Standards Consortium (1996–2002)
- Chairman and President of the WLAN Smart Card consortium (2004–2006)

== Publications ==
Book

- du Castel, Bertrand; Jurgensen, Timothy M. (2008). Computer Theology: Intelligent Design of the World Wide Web. Austin, Texas: Midori Press. ISBN 978-0-9801821-1-8.

Main publications in neuroscience, computer security, logic, artificial intelligence, software engineering, and linguistics:

- du Castel, Bertrand (July 15, 2015). "Pattern Activation/Recognition Theory of Mind". Frontiers in Computational Neuroscience. 9 (90). Lausanne: EPFL: 90. doi:10.3389/fncom.2015.00090. PMC 4502584. PMID 26236228.
- Vassilev, Apostol T.; du Castel, Bertrand; Ali, Asad M. (September–October 2007). "Personal Brokerage of Web Service Access". IEEE Security & Privacy. 5 (5). IEEE: 24–31. doi:10.1109/MSP.2007.118. S2CID 7173579.
- du Castel, Bertrand; Mao, Yi (November 2006). "Generics and Metaphors Unified under a Four-Layer Semantic Theory of Concepts" (PDF). Third Conference on Experience and Truth. Taipei, Taiwan: Soochow University. Archived from the original (PDF) on September 27, 2011.
- du Castel, Bertrand (July–August 2000). "Intelligence in "Artificial Wireless" (Death of the Washing Machine)". Twelfth Conference on Innovative Applications of Artificial Intelligence (IAAI-2000). Austin, Texas: Association for the Advancement of Artificial Intelligence.
- Rosenbaum, Susan; du Castel, Bertrand (April 1995). Managing Software Reuse – An Experience Report. 17th International Conference on Software Engineering. Seattle, Washington: Association for Computing Machinery.4
- du Castel, Bertrand (Spring 1978). "Form and Interpretation of Relative Clauses in English". Linguistic Inquiry. 9 (2). MIT Press: 275–289.

== Patents ==
- US patent 6,591,229, Neville Pattinson, Tibor Somogyi, Jean-Marc Pietrzyk and Bertrand du Castel, "Metrology Device with Java Programmable Smart Card", issued July 8, 2003
- US patent 6,157,966, Michael A. Montgomery, Scott B. Guthery and Bertrand du Castel, "System and Method for an ISO7816 Compliant Smart Card to Become Master over a Terminal", issued December 5, 2000
- US patent 7,127,529, Michael A. Montgomery, Scott B. Guthery and Bertrand du Castel, "Smart Card System Having Asynchroneous Communication With the Smart Card Operating System either as Master or Slave", issued October 24, 2006
- US patent 7,926,096, Asad Ali, Bertrand du Castel, Apostol Vassilev, Sylvain Prevost and Kapil Sachdeva, "Enforcing Time-based Transaction Policies on Devices Lacking Independent Clocks", issued April 12, 2011
- US patent 8,266,451, Robert Leydier and Bertrand du Castel, "Voice Activated Smart Card", issued September 11, 2012

== Awards ==
- Visionary Award (2005): Card Technology Magazine
