= Royal we =

Use of a first-person plural pronoun to refer to a single person

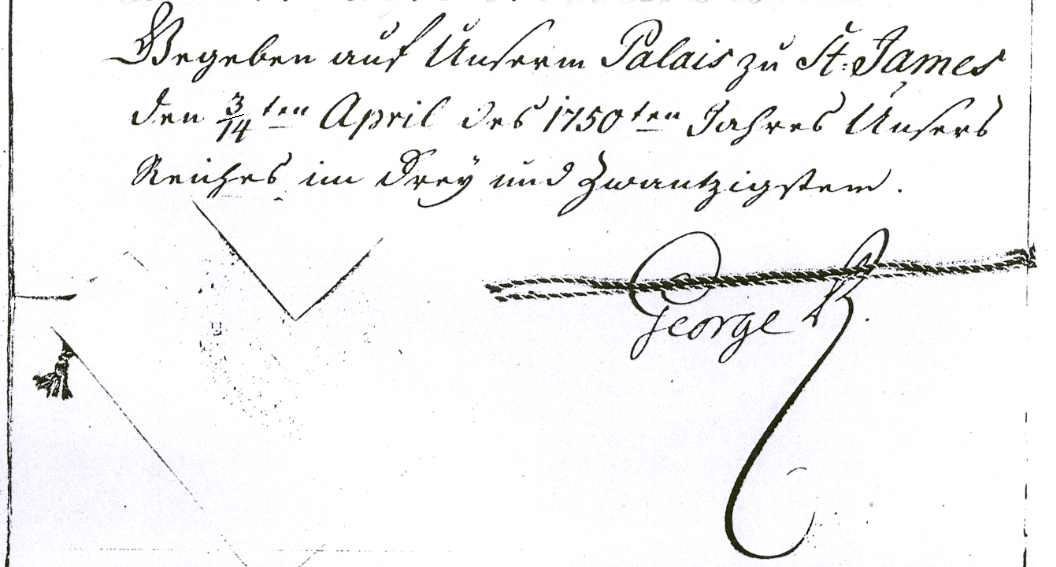
Document of 1750 signed by George II of Great Britain, using the royal we in German: Gegeben auf Unserm Palais zu St. James den 3/14ten April des 1750ten Jahres Unsers Reiches im Dreÿ und Zwantzigstem. George R ("Issued in Our Palace of St. James, on 3rd/14th April in the 1750th year in the three and twentieth of Our Reign. George R")

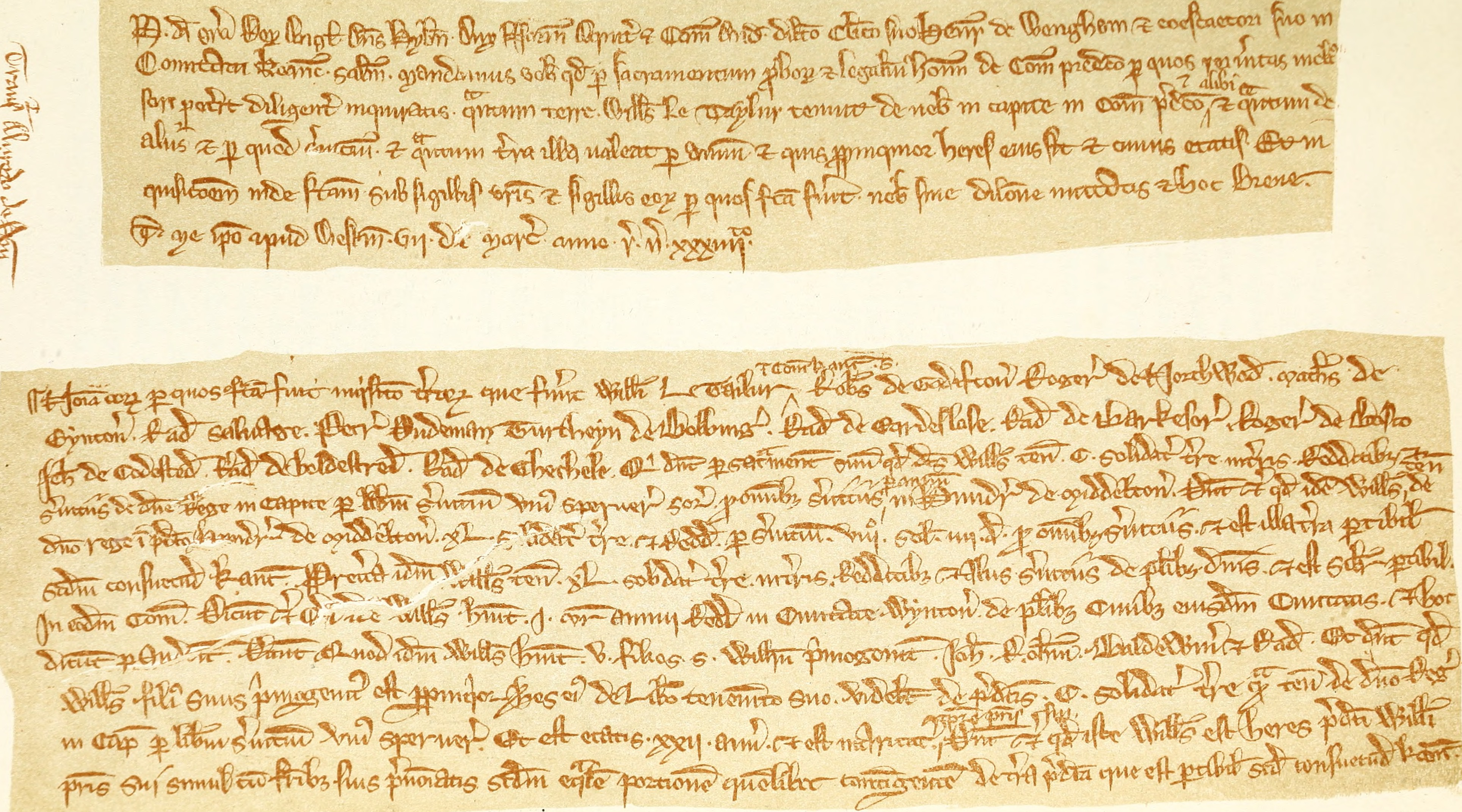
Latin document of 1249–50 issued by Henry III of England; he uses the phrase Mandamus vobis ("We command you").

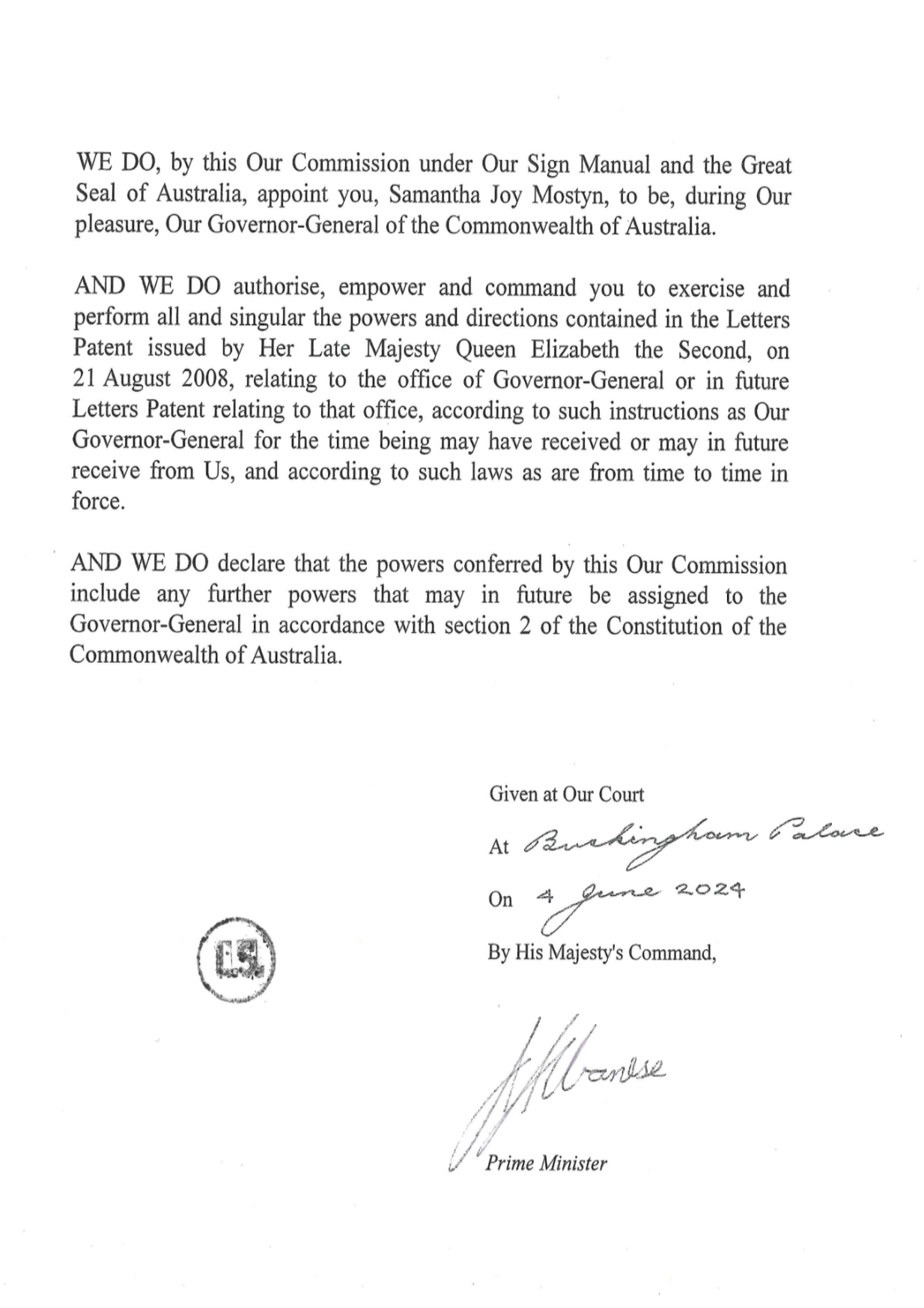
2024 Commission of Australian Governor-General Sam Mostyn, issued by Charles III

The royal we, also known as the majestic plural (Latin: pluralis maiestatis) or royal plural, is the use of a plural pronoun (or corresponding plural-inflected verb forms) by one who is a monarch or high office holder to refer to oneself. A more general term for the use of a we, us, or our to refer to oneself is nosism.

== Example ==
In 1902, after the United Kingdom had been asked to arbitrate a boundary dispute between Argentina and Chile, King Edward VII issued the adjudication of the requested arbitration, known as the Cordillera of the Andes Boundary Case. The sentence following the preamble of the award begins as follows:

Now, We, Edward, by the grace of God, King of the United Kingdom of Great Britain and Ireland and of the British Dominions beyond the Seas King, Defender of the Faith, Emperor of India, etc., etc., have arrived at the following decisions upon the questions in dispute, which have been referred to Our arbitration, ...

In this quotation, underlining has been added to the words that exemplify the use of the majestic plural.

== Western usage ==
The royal we is commonly employed by a person of high office, such as a monarch or other type of sovereign. It is also used in certain formal contexts by bishops and university rectors. William Longchamp is credited with its introduction to England in the late 12th century, following the practice of the Chancery of Apostolic Briefs.

In the public situations in which it is used, the monarch or other dignitary is typically speaking not only in their own personal capacity but also in an official capacity as leader of a nation or institution. In the grammar of several languages, plural forms tend to be perceived as deferential and more polite than singular forms.

In diplomatic letters, such as letters of credence, it is customary for monarchs to use the singular first-person (I, me, my) when writing to other monarchs, while the majestic plural is used in royal letters to a president of a republic.

In Commonwealth realms, the sovereign discharges their commissions to ranked military officers in the capacity of we. Many official documents published in the name of the monarch are also presented with royal we, such as letters patent, proclamations, etc.

Popes have historically used the we as part of their formal speech, for example as used in Notre charge apostolique, Mit brennender Sorge, and Non abbiamo bisogno. Since Pope John Paul I, however, the royal we has been dropped by popes in public speech, although formal documents may have retained it. Recent important papal documents still use the majestic plural in the original Latin but are given with the singular I in their official English translations.

In 1989, Margaret Thatcher, then Prime Minister of the United Kingdom, was met with disdain by some in the press for using the royal we when announcing to reporters that she had become a grandmother in her "We have become a grandmother" statement.

== Non-Western usage ==
Several prominent epithets of the Bible describe the Hebrew God in plural terms: Elohim, Adonai, and El Shaddai. Many Christian scholars, including the post-apostolic leaders and Augustine of Hippo, have seen the use of the plural and grammatically singular verb forms as support for the doctrine of the Trinity: since the "royal we" was not used at the time, it points to the intra-Trinitarian dialogue or divine dialogue that is between the Father, the Son, and the Holy Spirit. The earliest known use of this poetic device ("royal we") is somewhere in the 4th century AD, during the Byzantine period; nevertheless, scholars such as Mircea Eliade, Wilhelm Gesenius, and Aaron Ember claim that Elohim is a form of majestic plural in the Torah.

In Imperial China and every monarchy within its cultural sphere (including Japan, Korea, Ryukyu, and Vietnam), the majestic imperial pronoun was expressed by the character zhèn (朕, Old Chinese: *lrəmʔ). It was in fact the former Chinese first-person singular pronoun (that is, 'I'). However, following his unification of China, the Chinese emperor Qin Shi Huang arrogated it entirely for his personal use. Previously, in the Chinese cultural sphere, the use of the first-person pronoun in formal courtly language was already uncommon, with the nobility using the self-deprecating term guǎrén 寡人 ('lonely one') for self-reference, while their subjects referred to themselves as chén 臣 ('subject', originally meaning 'servant' or 'slave'), with an indirect deferential reference like zúxià 足下 ('below [your] foot'), or by employing a deferential epithet (such as the adjective yú (愚), 'foolish'). While this practice did not affect non-Chinese countries as much since their variants of zhèn (朕) and other terms were generally loanwords, the polite avoidance of pronouns nevertheless spread throughout East Asia. This still persists, except in China, where, following the May Fourth Movement and the Communist Party victory in the Chinese Civil War, the use of the first-person pronoun 我 wǒ, which dates to Shang dynasty oracle inscriptions as a plural possessive pronoun, is common. The pronoun 朕 remained in use by Japanese emperors until 1945, when watakushi (私) became more favoured.

In Hindustani (Hindi-Urdu, especially that of Western Hindi languages) and many other Indo-Aryan languages (maybe except that of the Eastern Indo-Aryan languages, such as Bihari languages, but also Bihari and other varieties of Eastern Hindi languages), the majestic plural is a common way for elders and those of higher social rank to refer to themselves. In certain communities, the first-person singular ma͠i (Hindi: मैं, Urdu: میں, lit. 'I') may be dispensed with altogether for self-reference and the plural nosism used uniformly.

In the Qur'ān, although many verses stress that Allah is the supreme unity, the grammatical structure of the text makes use of more complex patterns than the straightforward first-person singular pronouns ('Behold I, even I, am against thee...') or third-person singular pronouns ('And he said to me, "Go, and tell this people..."') that are used in the narratives of the Hebrew prophets. Here, instead, the royal we is used just as often as (if not more than) first-person singular pronouns and verb conjugations, such as when the revelations of Allah recount stories or convey lessons. Divine pronouns even sometimes rotate in the same sentence or paragraph while referring to the same events, moving between first-person singular, first-person plural (i.e., the royal we), second-person singular ('your Lord')/third-person plural ('their Lord'), and third-person masculine singular pronouns within the same context (cf. Sūrah al-Hijr 15:25-28). Qur'ānic scholars call this rotation of divine pronouns iltifāt (إلتِفات).

In Malaysia, before the Yang di-Pertuan Agong takes office, he will first swear an oath where he refers to himself with the Malay first person plural kami ("we"). This is because His Majesty represents the other Malay Rulers during his reign as the Yang di-Pertuan Agong.

In Indonesia, the royal we was historically used in the preambles of early legislative documents, such as Government Regulation No. 1/1945 and Law No. 1/1945. This was abandoned in 1946 since the issuance of Government Regulation No. 1/1946 and Law No. 1/1946. However, in very special case of President Sukarno's 1959 Decree, the royal we was used once more as a form of the unity of power held by Sukarno as the President and Commander-in-Chief of the National Armed Forces.

In Biblical Hebrew and rabbinic Jewish Aramaic, plural Elohim and ʾĕlāhīn (אֱלָהִין, "gods") are used as a plural of majesty. Rabbinic literature was itself aware of the theological questions raised by such plural forms: the Babylonian Talmud records minim ("heretics") citing plural expressions such as "Let us make man" (Genesis 1:26) as evidence for multiple deities, and answers that in each such verse the surrounding text uses the singular, as in "God created man" in the following verse.

== See also ==
- Generic you
- Pluralis excellentiae
- Royal one
- Singular they
- T–V distinction
