= Proselytization and counter-proselytization of Jews =

A number of religious groups, particularly Christians and Muslims, proselytize to Jews. In response, some Jewish groups have formed counter-missionary/counter-proselytization organizations to discourage missionary and messianic groups such as Jews for Jesus from using practices that they say are deceptive.

== Christian missions ==
According to Rabbi Tovia Singer, counter-missionary expert and director of Outreach Judaism, there are well over 1,000 messianic congregations and other missions to the Jews worldwide.

=== Catholic Church ===
The Catholic Church has historically been instrumental in its attempt to convert Jews. Such examples include conversos during the Inquisition, especially within Spain. However, since the Second Vatican Council and the production of the document Nostra aetate, the Catholic Church's attitude towards Jewish conversion has been that of sensitivity.

Pope Benedict XVI suggested that Jews should not be targeted for conversion. In his book, Jesus of Nazareth: Holy Week, he stated "Israel is in the hands of God, who will save it 'as a whole' at the proper time, when the number of Gentiles is full".

A document released by the Commission for Religious Relations with the Jews under Pope Francis stated "In concrete terms this means that the Catholic Church neither conducts nor supports any specific institutional mission work directed towards Jews", though it also says "Christians are nonetheless called to bear witness to their faith in Jesus Christ also to Jews." The document also denies that there is more than one path to salvation stating "Confessing the universal and therefore also exclusive mediation of salvation through Jesus Christ belongs to the core of Christian faith."

=== Protestantism ===
A number of Christian denominations have programs to reach Jews. The JTA, a Jewish news service, conducted an extensive analysis of Christian efforts to convert Jews to Christianity and found that some of the largest evangelical denominations – the Southern Baptists, the Assemblies of God, and the Lutheran Church–Missouri Synod – have all increased their efforts to evangelize Jews in the recent past.

The article states that the Christian missionary organization Jews for Jesus completed a five-year tour called "Behold Your God" that brought its message to 53 cities worldwide, and the Christian Chosen People Ministries saw its income grow by 31% to $7.9 million between 2003 and 2006.

Moody Bible Institute, a Protestant evangelical school, offers its students a major in Jewish evangelism, as does Biola University through its New York satellite program of Talbot School of Theology.

Jews for Judaism, a Jewish counter-missionary group, writes that there are over 900 Christian groups in North America actively involved in missionizing the Jewish people. Jews for Judaism further states that these groups are currently spending over $250 million each year on efforts to convert Jews to Christianity. Jews for Jesus, the best known single ministry to the Jews, spent over $15 million in 2008. The Assemblies of God has an extensive organization targeting Jews for conversion to Christianity.

Israel has more than one hundred Messianic congregations according to Yaakov Shalom Ariel, an associate professor of religious studies at the University of North Carolina and author of Evangelizing The Chosen People.

Proselytizing is legal in the country and missionaries of all religious groups are allowed to proselytize all citizens; however, a 1977 law prohibits any person from offering material benefits as an inducement to conversion. It was also illegal to convert persons under 18 years of age unless one parent were an adherent of the religious group seeking to convert the minor. Despite the legality of proselytism, the government has taken a number of steps that encouraged the perception that proselytizing is against government policy. For example, the MOI has detained individuals suspected of being "missionaries," and required of such persons bail and a pledge to abstain from missionary activity, in addition to refusing them entry into the country. It maintained denunciations of such activity from antimissionary groups like Yad L'Achim in its border control databases. The MOI has also cited proselytism as a reason to deny student, work, and religious visa extensions, as well as to deny permanent residency petitions. The Church of Jesus Christ of Latter-day Saints (Mormons) promised the Knesset in 1986 to refrain from all proselytism voluntarily in conjunction with receiving a building permit for its Jerusalem Center following protests from the Orthodox community.

— A 2010 US State Department report on religious freedom in Israel

A prominent effort to convert Jews to Christianity is known as Jews for Jesus. It was founded by Martin "Moishe" Rosen, who is of Jewish descent and grew up in a non-observant home, converted to Christianity, and was ordained as a Baptist minister in 1957. In 1973, Rosen left the employment of the American Board of Missions to the Jews, now called Chosen People Ministries, to incorporate a separate mission which became known as Jews for Jesus. In 1986, he received an honorary Doctor of Divinity Degree from Western Conservative Baptist Seminary in Portland, Oregon. Jews for Jesus is now led by David Brickner, who has been working for the organization since 1977.

The 19th century saw at least 250,000 Jews convert to Christianity according to existing records of various societies. Data from the Pew Research Center has it that, as of 2013, about 1.6 million adult American Jews identify themselves as Christians; most as Protestants. According to the same data, most of the Jews who identify themselves as some sort of Christian (1.6 million) were raised as Jews or are Jews by ancestry. According to a 2012 study, 17% of Jews in Russia identify themselves as Christians.

Efforts to convert Jews to Christianity are sometimes regarded as antisemitic. Most Progressive Christian and Mainline Christian denominations have publicly declared that they no longer proselytize Jews.

== Muslim missions ==
Muslims have also targeted Jews for conversion. Rabbi Moshe Cohen, of Yad L'Achim, an Israel-based counter-missionary organization, has identified Al Dawaa, an Israel-based Muslim group headed by Sheikh Abu Yassin of Kafr Manda.

== Jewish response ==
Jewish counter-missionary organizations respond to these efforts by offering personal counseling, web sites with articles addressing common missionary tactics, and discussion forums where Jews who have questions about the differences between Judaism and other religions can be answered by observant Jews.

Some Jewish resources are specifically aimed at countering the missionary efforts aimed at Jews.

- Jews for Judaism is an international organization that provides a wide variety of counseling services, along with education, and outreach programs that enable Jews of all ages to rediscover and strengthen their Jewish heritage. Jews for Judaism has offices in Baltimore, Toronto, Los Angeles, Australia and South Africa. On their website, Jews for Judaism offers many articles discussing missionary tactics towards Jews, approaches by Mormons, Jehovah's Witnesses and various "proof texts" and other arguments often used by missionaries as they evangelize Jews.
- Outreach Judaism, a site run by Rabbi Tovia Singer. Outreach Judaism is an international organization that responds directly to the issues raised by missionaries and cults, by exploring Judaism in contradistinction to fundamentalist Christianity. Outreach Judaism provides full-time, multi-level informational resources.
- Beyneynu (בינינו) was founded by former Evangelical missionary Shannon Nuszen. Beyneynu is a non-profit organization that monitors missionary activity in Israel and abroad. Based in Israel, Beyneynu works with government and community leaders to raise awareness of Jewish evangelism, its danger to the Jewish people, and encourage safe and consistent boundaries in the interfaith relationships of Jewish communities worldwide.
- Kiruv Organization (Mizrachi) – an outreach organization founded in 1995 by Rabbi Yosef Mizrachi in New York for the purpose of teaching Torah to both secular and religious Jews.
- In the late 20th century, in large cities throughout North America, Jewish communal organizations, including the Jewish Federations, Jewish Community Relations Councils, and Jewish Family Services, set up task forces on cults and missionaries to combat evangelistic activity in the Jewish community.

Rabbi Moshe Shulman has responded to specific missionaries who target Jews, including Michael Brown, Rachmiel Frydland, Risto Santala, and David H. Stern (author of the Complete Jewish Bible). Rabbi Shulman's website offers scholarly articles on the misuse of the Targums, Midrash and Talmud by non-Jews who quote from Jewish sources in an attempt to convert Jews.

The leading counter-missionary organization in Israel is Yad L'Achim, an organization focusing on Orthodox Judaism outreach and counter-missionary activity. Yad L'Achim is made up of both paid staff and volunteers, and is largely supported by donations both from Israel and the diaspora.

== See also ==
- Apostasy in Judaism
- Baal teshuva
- Jewish polemics and apologetics in the Middle Ages
- Jewish views on religious pluralism
- Judaism's view of Jesus
- David Klinghoffer
