= Interfaith marriage in Judaism =

Jewish religious views on interfaith marriages

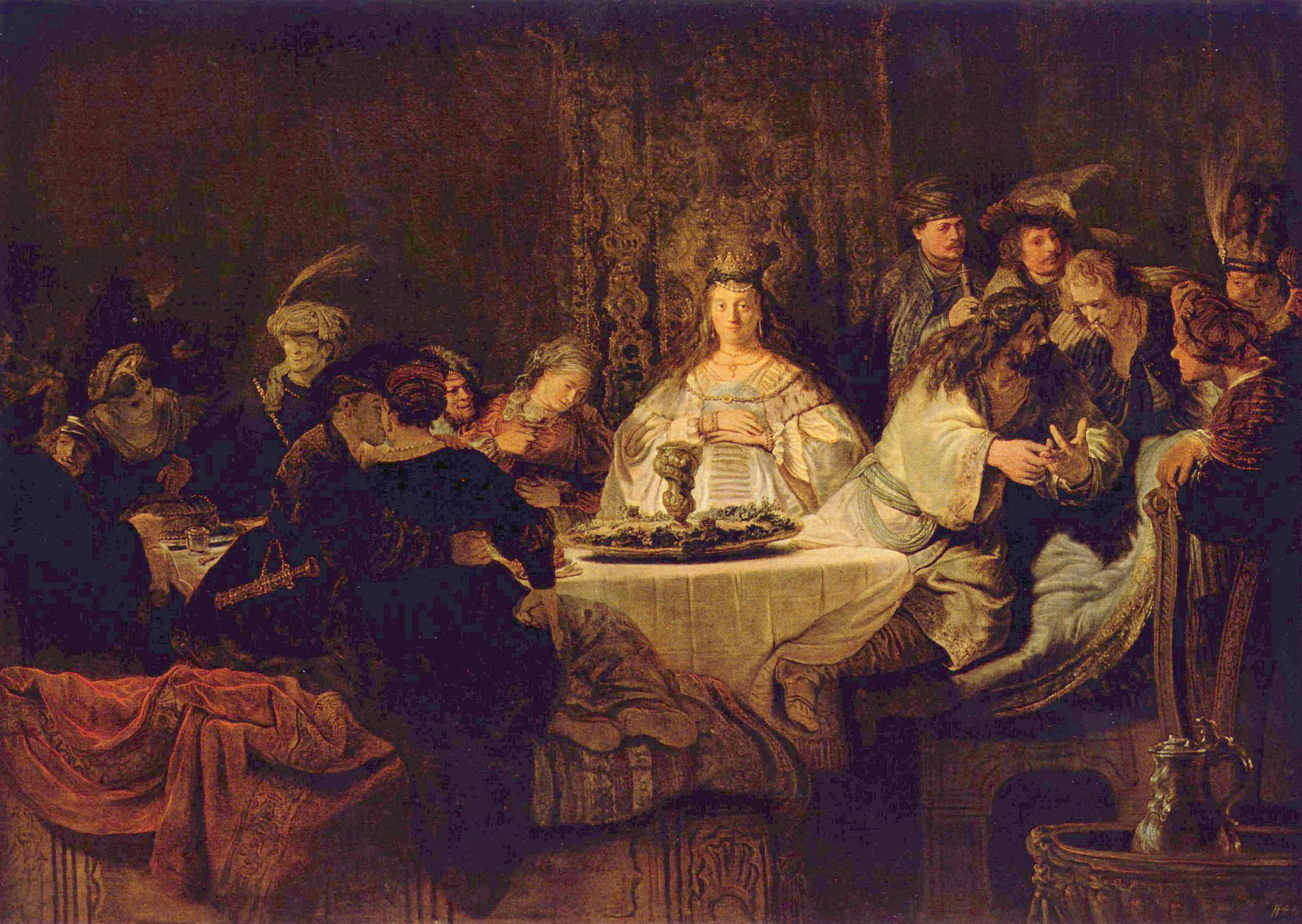
The Wedding Feast of Samson by Rembrandt, depicting the marriage of Samson and Delilah

In Judaism, interfaith marriage has historically been viewed with strong disapproval by Jewish leaders and remains a contentious issue within the Jewish community. According to Halakha (Jewish law), as derived from the Talmud, marriage between a Jew and a non-Jew is both prohibited and considered void under Jewish law. The Haskalah influenced more diverse perspectives on interfaith marriage.

A 2020 survey conducted by the Pew Research Center in the United States reported that 42% of married American Jewish respondents had a non-Jewish spouse. Among those who married after 2010, the intermarriage rate was 61%, rising to 72% when excluding Orthodox Jews from the data.

== In the Hebrew Bible ==
The Hebrew Bible contains numerous accounts of interethnic marriages. Prominent figures, such as Abraham, Moses, and David, are described as taking non-Israelite women as wives or consorts. The books of Ezra–Nehemiah describe widespread intermarriage between Jews and Samaritans and, to a lesser extent, Philistines. Interfaith marriage, however, was widely condemned, as it was believed that such a union could result in the perversion or abandonment of the Israelite religion. Since the notion of these interethnic marriages was inextricably tied to the potential mixing of Israelite and foreign religions, the biblical text uses the condition of having "foreign" spouses to illustrate the concerns surrounding interfaith unions.

The Hebrew Bible contains numerous laws restricting or forbidding interethnic and, by extension, interfaith marriages. Ancient Israelites were prohibited from marrying individuals from the Seven Nations residing within the Land of Israel. Israelites were permitted to marry foreign female prisoners of war under strict conditions: the women could not be from cities within the Land of Israel, as these might have been inhabited by the forbidden nations. Additionally, the captive woman was to be a virgin and not allowed to have any sexual relations with her captor until after she had mourned her absent parents for a full month. If a soldier became tired of her, he was to give her freedom if she asked for it; he was not to sell her or enslave her since this was a marriage under compulsion.

The Torah posits that a Jewish soldier should not marry a captive non-Jewish woman as a wife because the son would rebel against his father; this would later happen to King David and Absalom.

The crisis of the Babylonian exile renewed concerns for maintaining the "purity" of the ethnic Israelite population. Ezra is described as urging his fellow Jews to separate from their "foreign" wives and children. Under his tutelage, intermarriage came to be highly discouraged.

== Later laws and rulings ==
In the first century CE, Jewish marriage customs seem to have generally favored endogamy, and conversion before marriage was often expected in cases of intermarriage. This practice was upheld by members of the Herodian dynasty, who insisted that their spouses convert. The Roman historian Tacitus, in Histories (c. 100–110 CE), describes Jews as maintaining social separation, stating that they "sit apart at meals, they sleep apart, and [...] abstain from intercourse with foreign women". Many Jews likely viewed intermarriage with non-Jews with distaste, asserting the importance of conversion in maintaining group boundaries. The insistence on conversion was not a missionary effort, but a means of preserving Jewish identity, as post-marital conversion—allowed in Christian practice—was not customary in Judaism.

The Talmud asserts that a marriage between a Jew and a non-Jew is prohibited and does not constitute a valid marriage under Jewish law unless the non-Jew converts to Judaism. From biblical times through the Middle Ages, exogamy—marriage outside the Jewish community—was common, as was conversion to Judaism.

In medieval Europe, Christian rulers prohibited marriages between Jews and Christians, often under penalty of death.

Over time, these restrictions were lifted in many regions, and interfaith marriages involving Jews became more frequent. In 1236, Moses ben Jacob of Coucy induced Jews bespoused by such marriages to dissolve them. In 1807, Napoleon's Grand Sanhedrin declared these marriages civilly valid, though not recognized under Jewish law, and stated that they should not be treated as anathema. This stance was extended in 1844 by the Rabbinical Conference of Brunswick to include any adherent of a monotheistic religion, but forbade marriages involving those who lived in states where children of the marriage could not be raised Jewish. The conference was controversial and one member later became an opponent of intermarriage.

Traditional Judaism does not consider marriages between a Jew by birth and a convert as interfaith marriages. Classical rabbinic interpretations maintain that biblical intermarriages, such as that of Joseph and Asenath or Ruth to Boaz, occurred after the non-Israelite partner's conversion. Opinions vary on whether certain groups, such as Canaanites, were eligible for marriage even after conversion; this did not necessarily apply to their children. The Shulchan Aruch and its commentaries bring various opinions as to whether intermarriage is a Torah prohibition and when the prohibition is rabbinic.

Foundlings—children abandoned without identifiable parents—were generally classified as non-Jews concerning intermarriage if found in areas with at least one non-Jewish resident. This contrasted with other areas of Jewish law that classified foundlings as Jewish if the majority of the people were Jewish in the area in which they were found. If a child's mother was known, but not the father, the child was treated as a foundling, unless the mother claimed that the child was an Israelite.

Marriages between Jews and "German-blooded" people were banned in Nazi Germany under the Nuremberg Laws.

=== Modern attitudes ===
The Talmud and subsequent classical sources of Jewish law state that the institution of Jewish marriage, kiddushin, can only be effected between Jews.

A 2013 Pew Research Center study found that children of intermarriages were more likely to intermarry themselves and to identify as religiously unaffiliated. Younger generations of intermarried families showed a higher rate of Jewish identification compared to older generations. The study noted that the long-term effects of intermarriage on Jewish identity remain uncertain.

==== Orthodox Judaism ====
Orthodox Judaism adheres strictly to historic Jewish attitudes to intermarriage, refusing to accept intermarriages as valid or legitimate, along with strictly forbidding sexual intercourse with a member of a different faith. Orthodox rabbis do not officiate at interfaith weddings and generally avoid facilitating them, also try to avoid assisting them in other ways. Secular intermarriage is seen as apostasy, and intermarried individuals are effectively cut off from most Orthodox communities. Outreach efforts by some groups, such as Chabad and Modern Orthodox Jews, do reach out to intermarried Jews, particularly target intermarried Jewish women, since Orthodox law considers the children of Jewish women to be Jewish regardless of the father's status. Orthodox teachings view marriage between a Jewish man and woman as a reunion of two halves of the same soul, making relationships with non-Jews a disgrace. Some Orthodox families observe shiva (mourning rites) for relatives who marry outside the faith, symbolically mourning the potential loss of future generations who may not be raised as Jewish.

Intermarriage is controversially referred to as the "Silent Holocaust" (Hebrew: שואה שקטה, romanized: Shoah Shketa) in some Orthodox circles. Communal leaders, such as Rabbi Ephraim Buchwald of the National Jewish Outreach Program, popularized the phrase. Buchwald claimed in 1992 that the Jewish community would not be recognizable in 25 to 30 years.

==== Masorti Judaism ====
Masorti Judaism does not sanction or recognize the Jewish legal validity of intermarriage but encourages the inclusion of non-Jewish spouses within Jewish families in hopes of fostering eventual conversion. The Rabbinical Assembly's Standards of Rabbinic Practice prohibit Conservative rabbis from officiating at intermarriages and, until 2018, also forbade them from attending such ceremonies. In 1995 the Leadership Council of Conservative Judaism published the following statement on intermarriage:

In the past, intermarriage... was viewed as an act of rebellion, a rejection of Judaism. Jews who intermarried were essentially excommunicated. But now, intermarriage is often the result of living in an open society... If our children end up marrying non-Jews, we should not reject them. We should continue to give our love and by that retain a measure of influence in their lives, Jewishly and otherwise. Life consists of constant growth and our adult children may yet reach a stage when Judaism has new meaning for them. However, the marriage between a Jew and non-Jew is not a celebration for the Jewish community.....

==== Progressive Judaism ====
In the United States, Reform and Reconstructionist Judaism generally do not regard Jewish law as binding.

A 1985 survey found that over 87% of Reconstructionist rabbis were willing to officiate at interfaith marriages. In 2015, the Reconstructionist Rabbinical College became the first Jewish seminary to allow rabbis in interfaith relationships.

The Central Conference of American Rabbis consistently opposed intermarriage until the 1980s. By 2003, at least 50% of Reform rabbis were willing to perform interfaith ceremonies. Some Reform congregations, including New York City’s Central Synagogue, conduct interfaith marriages to promote Jewish continuity, with the aim of encouraging non-Jewish spouses to convert. In 2024, Hebrew Union College, the seminary of the Reform movement, announced a decision to rescind the requirement that the partners of students in long term committed relationships be Jewish.

Humanistic Judaism considers intermarriage a "positive consequence of a free and open society". The Society for Humanistic Judaism advocates welcoming intermarried families as an opportunity to welcome non-Jews into the Jewish community.

== Prevalence ==
=== 2013 Pew Research poll ===
A 2013 Pew Research poll found that 58% of Jewish marriages in the United States were interfaith, with significant variation by denomination. Among Orthodox Jews, 2% of marriages were interfaith, compared to 27% among Conservative Jews, 50% among Reform Jews, and 69% among non-denominational Jews.

The study also noted differences in interfaith marriage rates based on religious identity. Among religiously observant Jews, 36% were intermarried, while the rate was significantly higher at 79% among atheist Jews.

Intermarriage rates were found to have remained consistent since 2000. Before 1970, 17% of Jewish marriages were interfaith.

=== 2015 Pew Research poll ===
In the U.S., Jewish intermarriage is common, and those who do intermarry with someone of a different religion are more likely to marry a Catholic than a mainline Protestant (8%), but are about as likely to marry Catholics (9%) and Protestants overall (10%), and more likely to intermarry with those who are unaffiliated (11%).

=== 2024 Pew Research poll ===
According to a 2024 study by the Pew Research Center, 65% of married Jewish respondents say their spouse is also Jewish. Meanwhile, 19% report having a Christian spouse, 15% have a religiously unaffiliated spouse, and 2% have a spouse who belongs to another religion, such as Islam, Buddhism, or others.

== Definitions of interfaith marriage ==
Different Jewish movements hold distinct views on who is considered Jewish, influencing their definitions of interfaith marriage. Orthodox Judaism maintains that Jewish status is determined matrilineally and does not recognize individuals as Jewish if their mother is not Jewish or if their conversion did not adhere to classical Jewish law. Masorti Judaism also rejects patrilineal descent, though some Conservative rabbis may accept Reform conversions even if they do not meet traditional halachic criteria. Reform Judaism recognizes patrilineal descent if the child is raised in a Jewish context.

In certain cases, a Jew may marry a non-Jew who believes in God as understood by Judaism and rejects other theological frameworks. Such individuals are sometimes referred to as Noahides by the Jewish community. Rabbi Steven Greenberg has suggested that in such instances, the non-Jewish partner could be viewed as a ger toshav.

== Impact and consequences ==
In the early 19th century, intermarriage among Jews was extremely rare in many less modernized regions. For example, in Algeria, fewer than 0.1% of Jews practiced exogamy. By the early 20th century, intermarriage rates remained low in many Germanic regions of Central Europe, where about 5% of Jews married non-Jews. However, in Berlin during the same period, the rate was notably higher at 18%, and nearly half of all Jews in Australia intermarried.

In recent decades, intermarriage rates have risen significantly in many countries. The National Jewish Population Survey 2000–2001 reported that 47% of American Jews who married between 1996 and 2001 married non-Jews. The 1990 National Jewish Population Survey recorded an intermarriage rate of 52% among American Jews. This trend has led to widespread concern among some Jewish leaders, who view the increasing rates of intermarriage as a potential threat to the long-term survival of Judaism. As early as the mid-19th century, senior Jewish figures denounced intermarriage as a danger to Jewish continuity.

In the United States, birth rates among Jews have declined, with the average Jewish adult having 1.5 children as of 2021. Some religious conservatives metaphorically describe intermarriage as a "silent holocaust." In contrast, many liberal Jews view interfaith marriage as an enriching aspect of multicultural society. There has been a growing effort to engage the descendants of intermarried parents. Each Jewish denomination focuses outreach on those it considers Jewish, while secular and non-denominational organizations aim to reconnect all descendants of intermarriage to the Jewish community.

In some cases, children of interfaith marriages were raised in the non-Jewish parent's religion while maintaining a sense of Jewish ethnic identity. One notable example is Barry Goldwater, who had a Jewish father and an Episcopalian mother. Goldwater was a lifelong Episcopalian who acknowledged his Jewish ancestry, though he rarely identified as Jewish.

== Christian–Jewish relations ==
Many Christian churches accept and may actively promote the conversion of Jews. Messianic Jewish organizations, including Jews for Jesus, actively seek to encourage such conversions. Some Christian denominations reject efforts to convert Jews, with many embracing dual-covenant theology.

Jewish counter-missionary and anti-missionary organizations, including Outreach Judaism, work to discourage Jews from converting to Christianity. Conversely, Messianic Jewish organizations, including Jews for Jesus, actively seek to encourage such conversions, often framing them as a fulfillment of Jewish identity.

== Opposition to mixed marriages in Israel ==
Interfaith relationships and marriages are a contentious issue in the State of Israel, with strong opposition among Israeli Jews, particularly to relationships between Jewish women and Muslim men. A 2007 survey found that over half of Israeli Jews equated intermarriage with "national treason."

In 2005, Bentzi Gopstein founded the anti-miscegenation organisation Lehava. Lehava members have patrolled the Israeli settlement of Pisgat Ze'ev in East Jerusalem to discourage Jewish women from dating Palestinian men. Lehava’s leader, Gopstein, was indicted in November 2019 on charges of incitement to terrorism, violence, and racism.

Municipalities in Israel have also taken measures to prevent interfaith relationships. In Petah Tikva, officials established a telephone hotline for individuals to report Jewish women dating Palestinian men and offered psychological counseling for these women. Similarly, the city of Kiryat Gat implemented school programs warning Jewish girls against dating local Bedouin men.

Organizations such as Chemla and Yad L'Achim actively oppose interfaith marriages and engage in efforts to stop Jewish women from being in relationships with Palestinians.

Interfaith marriages are extremely rare in Israel, comprising approximately 2% of the population. A Pew Research Center study conducted in 2014–2015 revealed that 97% of Israeli Jews reported being uncomfortable with the idea of their child marrying a Muslim, while 89% expressed similar discomfort with their child marrying a Christian.

== See also ==
- Interfaith marriage
- Jewish views of marriage
- Association for the Protection of Mixed Families' Rights
- Jewish adjacent
- Jüdisch versippt
