= Ban on conversion to Judaism in Argentina =

The ban on conversion to Judaism in Argentina is a boycott based on a judgement issued in 1927 by the Sephardic Rabbi Shaul Seton (Heb') (Aleppo, Syria, 1851 – Argentina, June 15, 1930) and Rabbi Aharon Halevi Goldman (Heb') (Podolya, Russian Empire, 1854 – Argentina, February 13, 1932). According to the ban, no one is permitted to conduct conversion to Judaism on the land of Argentina. Its purpose was to deter young Jews from intermarriage. The boycott was not fully enforced, and there is evidence of the existence of conversions even after it was imposed. According to Rabbi Eliyahu Birenboym, the boycott did not achieve its goals, and Jewish assimilation remains a widespread phenomenon in Argentina.

== Content ==
The boycott was announced as a permanent rabbinic boycott, making it impossible for any Jew to conduct a conversion, without officially canceling the boycott.

According to the boycott, those who want to convert are asked to do so in Jerusalem and undergo the conversion there. Practically, the journey to Jerusalem was long and expensive in those days, and this demand made conversion close to impossible:

Therfore I dispersed announcements that it is forbidden to accept converts in Argentina until the end of time, for several reasons which we three rabbis endorse. This must not be transgressed, for anyone that breaks a fence will be bitten by a snake. Whoever wishes to be converted should travel to Jerusalem and perchance will be accepted there by the rabbinic court.

— Rabbi Saul David Sethon, Diber Saul, chapter 3

The boycott was not accepted by Conservative rabbis, who continued to conduct conversions in the country. Even among the Orthodox Sefardi community in Buenos Aires it took a few decades until the ban was accepted.

=== The validity of conversions made despite the boycott ===
Since the boycott was not fully kept, many rabbis were asked what is the status of conversions made against the boycott.

Rabbi Chizkia Shabtai ruled that the boycott has the power to invalidate any conversion made in Argentina. On the other hand, the majority of the rabbis ruled that the boycott means it is forbidden to conduct conversions, but does not invalidate the conversions made. That was the opinion of Rabbi Abraham Isaac Kook, Rabbi Pesah Zvi Frank and Rabbi Ovadia Yosef.
