= Brickner =

Brickner may refer to:

- Balfour Brickner (November 18, 1926 – August 29, 2005), leading rabbi in the Reform Judaism movement
- Barnett R. Brickner (September 14, 1892 – May 14, 1958), American rabbi
- David Brickner (born September 29, 1958), Christian who has been head of the missionary group Jews for Jesus since 1996
- George H. Brickner (January 21, 1834 – August 12, 1904), German-born American Democratic politician
- Gordon Douglas Brickner (December 15, 1907 – September 29, 1993), American actor and director
- Linda Day (born August 12, 1938 as Linda Brickner; died October 23, 2009), American TV director
- Ralph (Harold) Brickner (May 2, 1925 – May 9, 1994), relief pitcher for 1952 Boston Red Sox

== See also ==
- Bruckner (disambiguation)
