= Samson's riddle =

Narrative in the biblical Book of Judges

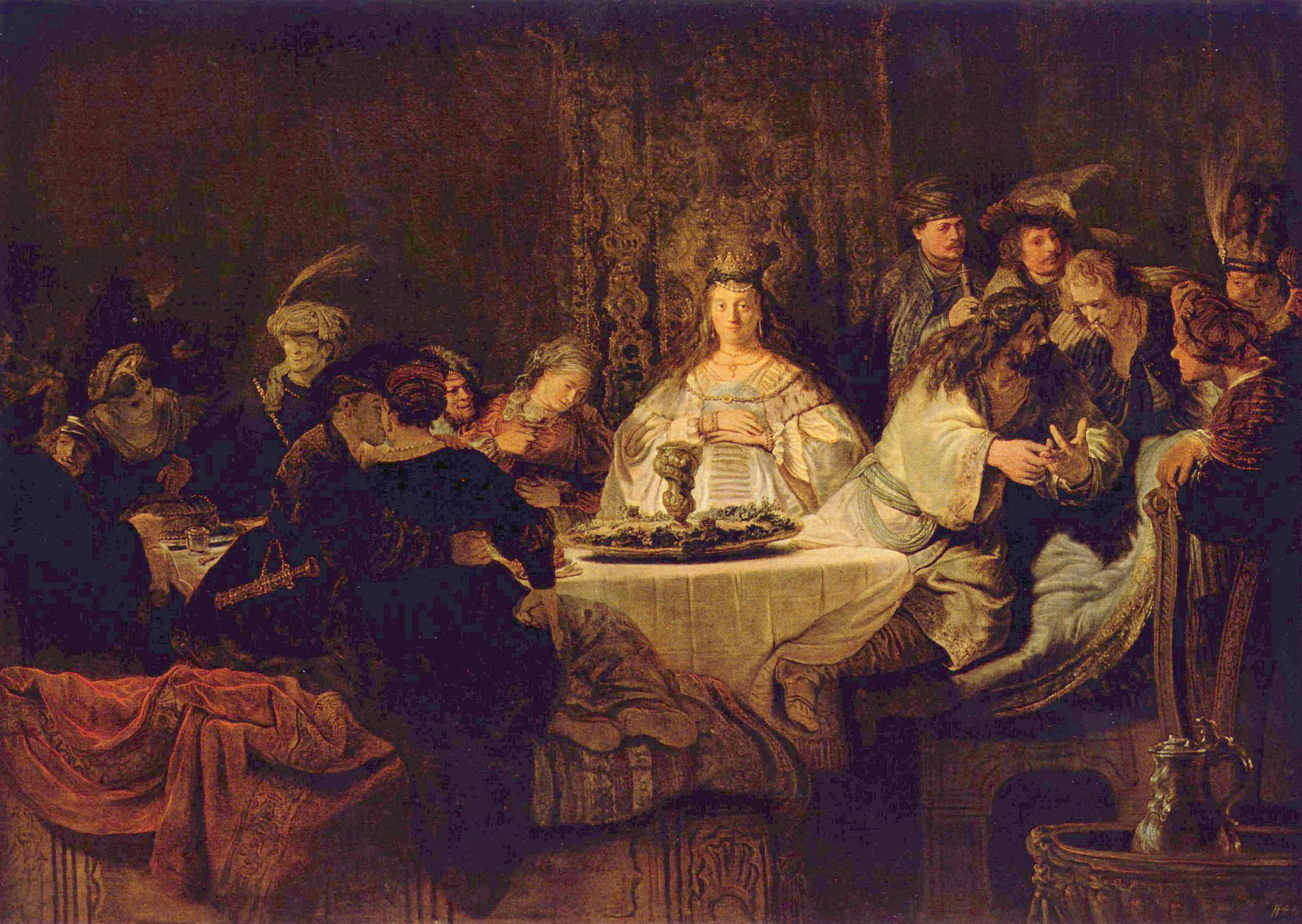
The Wedding Feast of Samson, Rembrandt, 1638

Samson's riddle is found in the biblical Book of Judges, where it is incorporated into a larger narrative about Samson, the last of the judges of the ancient Israelites. The riddle, with which Samson challenges his thirty wedding guests, is as follows: "Out of the eater came something to eat, and out of the strong came something sweet."

The solution is apparently impossible to discern through deduction alone, since it is based on a private experience of Samson's, who had previously killed a young male lion and found honeybees and honey in its corpse. However, the wedding guests extort the answer from Samson's wife; having lost the wager, Samson is required to give his guests thirty good suits, which he acquires by killing thirty men.

Modern commentators have suggested other possible solutions to the riddle. Aspects of the surrounding narrative have also been interpreted in various ways, with parallels being drawn to Greek myths of lion-killing heroes, and to the ancient belief that living creatures could spontaneously emerge from dead flesh.

== Biblical narrative ==
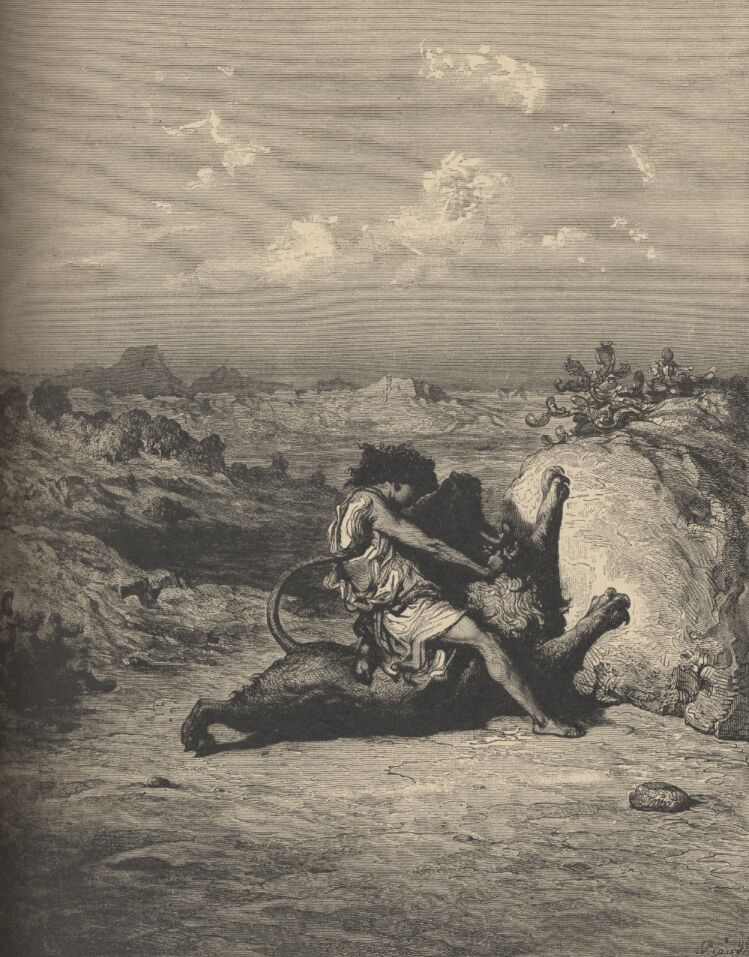
Samson Slaying the Lion, Doré

The story of Samson's riddle comprises chapter 14 of the Book of Judges. It begins when Samson encounters a Philistine woman in the city of Timnah and decides to marry her, against the objections of his parents. While travelling to Timnah to meet with the woman, Samson is attacked by a young lion. The Spirit of the Lord comes upon him, and he tears the lion apart with his bare hands.

Some time later, Samson returns to Timnah to take the Philistine woman in marriage. On the way, he passes the spot where he had killed the lion, and finds that a swarm of bees have created a hive inside the carcass. Samson gathers some honey from the hive for himself and his parents, but he does not tell his parents about the lion.

At the wedding feast, Samson proposes the following riddle to his Philistine guests:

מהאכל יצא מאכל
ומעז יצא מתוק

Translation:

Out of the eater came something to eat,
And out of the strong came something sweet.

Samson wagers that the Philistines will be unable to guess the solution to the riddle within seven days (the duration of the feast); the stakes of the wager are thirty linen garments and thirty outfits of clothes. The Philistines compel Samson's new wife to discover the solution for them, threatening to burn her and her father's house if she fails. She accordingly pleads with Samson to tell her the answer to the riddle, and on the seventh day Samson capitulates. Samson's wife passes the solution on to the wedding guests, who repeat it to Samson before sunset on the seventh day, saying: "What is sweeter than honey? And what is stronger than a lion?" Samson replies: "If you had not plowed with my heifer, you would not have solved my riddle."

The Spirit of the Lord comes upon Samson once more, and he goes to Ashkelon and kills thirty Philistines, taking their clothes to pay off the debt owed to his wedding guests. Then, angered by his wife's betrayal, Samson returns to his own family, and the woman is given instead to one of the guests. This incident sets in motion a series of violent conflicts between Samson and the Philistines, as described in subsequent chapters.

== Interpretation ==
There are several difficulties in the text, especially concerning Samson's parents' involvement in the phases preceding the wedding, and concerning chronological aspects in the description of the feast and the riddle. Traditional exegesis tends to harmonize the difficulties, but in critical exegesis, these difficulties are usually treated by assuming that the text has undergone several editorial phases.

Some scholars, such as Othniel Margalith, think that the Samson cycle in general, and Samson's riddle and its surrounding narrative in particular, were largely influenced by Philistine culture, which is generally thought to be related to Ancient Greek culture by way of the Mycenaeans. Accordingly, some scholars treat the narrative, or certain motifs in it, in light of parallel stories of Greek mythology and folklore.

=== Tearing of the lion ===
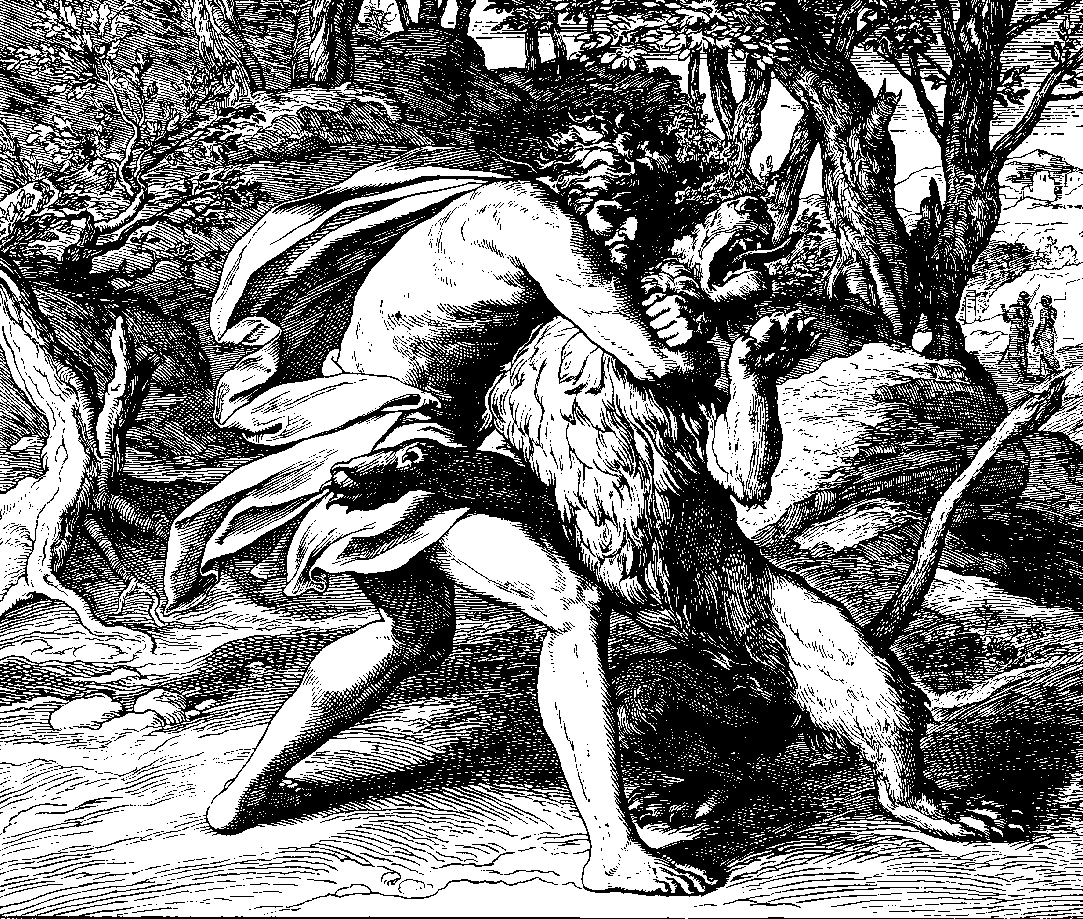
Samson Slays a Lion, 1860 woodcut by Julius Schnorr von Karolsfeld

The tearing of the lion can be treated as a legendary description meant to exalt Samson as a superhuman hero, like other descriptions in the Samson cycle that demonstrate his prodigious physical strength. The motif of a hero defeating a lion is widespread in world folklore, and appears in other places in the Hebrew Bible; similar stories are told of David (1 Samuel 17:36) and of Benaiah (2 Samuel 23:20).

According to Paul Carus, the lion is a mythical symbol of the heat of the sun, and Samson represents the solar deity who can "kill the lion", that is, diminish the heat of the sun. Carus' conjecture is rooted in an old scholarly approach, not accepted in current research, which considers Samson a mythological "solar hero" – that is, a god or a demigod related to the sun – and interprets the stories about him from this point of view.

Othniel Margalith points out the fact that in other occurrences of the motif of the defeating of a lion in the Bible, and in the ancient Near East in general, the hero hunts the lion and does not kill him bare-handed as in the Samson story. On the other hand, this detail of killing the lion bare-handed is widespread in Greek sources. This indicates, according to Margalith, the Mycenaean background of the biblical story. Margalith compares the story about Samson tearing the lion to the story about Heracles killing the Nemean lion bare-handed; and to other heroes of Greek mythology, who like Samson kill a lion bare-handed on their way to obtain a wife.

In 2012, archaeologists excavating Tel Beit Shemesh in the Judaean Hills near Jerusalem discovered an ancient stone seal that may depict the story of Samson's fight with a lion. The seal, measuring 1.5 centimeters in diameter, shows a large animal with a feline tail attacking a human figure with what appears to be long hair. It has been dated to roughly the 11th century BCE, a period many scholars consider to be the time of the Biblical judges. The seal was unearthed near the river Sorek, which marked the boundary between the Israelites and their Philistine foes, indicating that the figure on the seal could potentially represent Samson or could evidence the origin story of Samson's fight with the lion.

=== Honey in the lion's carcass ===
Samson's discovery of a beehive in the lion's carcass is difficult to explain in realistic terms, as bees would normally avoid putrifying flesh. It is sometimes suggested that the word usually translated "carcass" should actually read "skeleton", or that the insects found by Samson were in fact carrion flies, but neither explanation gives a satisfactory reading.

The incident is more often considered to be a miraculous occurrence, or to be inspired by the ancient belief in spontaneous generation, the emergence of living creatures from nonliving matter. Numerous Greek and Roman literary sources describe a ritual known as bugonia, which was said to be a way of producing bees from the carcass of an ox, and this may have been the basis of the Samson narrative.

=== The riddle ===
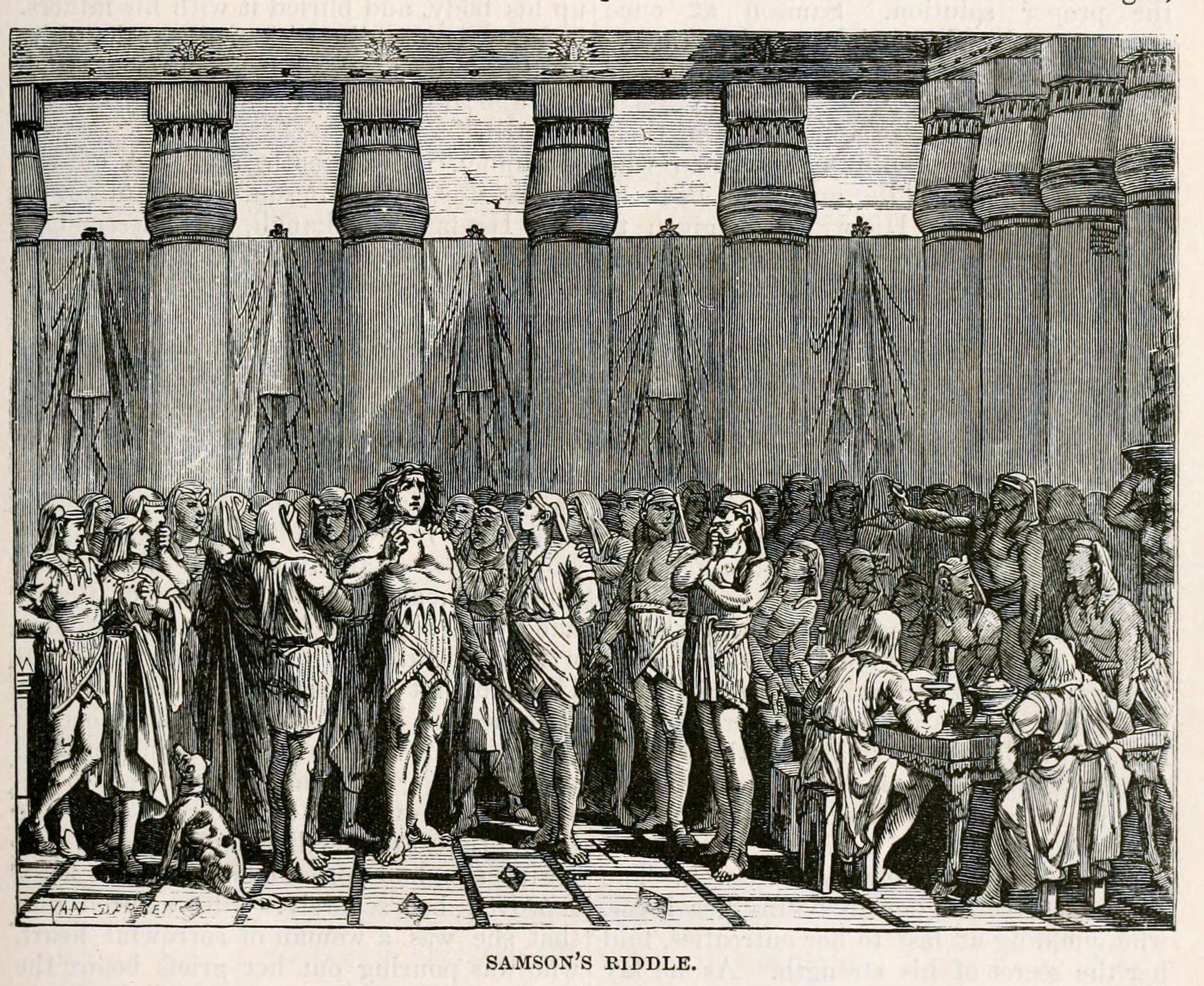
Samson Riddle

Samson's riddle – the only explicit example of a riddle in the Hebrew Bible – has been described as an unfair one, as it is apparently impossible to guess the answer without knowledge of Samson's encounter with the lion, which he had kept a secret from everyone. Many commentators have therefore attempted to prove that the riddle is capable of other solutions.

Heymann Steinthal, writing in the late 19th century, observed that bees in ancient Palestine would have been at their most productive when the sun was in the sign of Leo, a fact which Samson's guests ought to have known. Hans Bauer suggested that the riddle was a play on words, positing that the original text of the story made use of an Arabic word for "honey" which, in Hebrew, would be identical to the word for "lion". According to this theory, the riddle was etymological, with the solution being: "the word 'honey' was derived from the word 'lion'". However, later scholars have been unable to confirm the existence of the Arabic word in question.

James L. Crenshaw has argued that possible solutions to the riddle include "vomit" and "semen", which would both connect with the circumstances of the wedding feast. In support of the "semen" interpretation, Crenshaw cites several other passages in biblical writing in which eating and drinking are used as metaphors for sexual intercourse.

The solution offered by the wedding guests – "What is sweeter than honey, and what is stronger than a lion?" – also has the appearance of a riddle. Hermann Stahn suggested that this may have been a traditional wedding riddle, with the answer being "love". Other potential solutions to this second riddle include "venom", "death" and "knowledge".

One Christian interpretation holds that the story of the riddle discloses "the entire divine logic governing Samson's life". Samson's strength, throughout his story, is employed towards violent ends, but "something sweet" ultimately emerges from his actions; that is, the destruction of the enemies of Israel.

== In popular culture ==
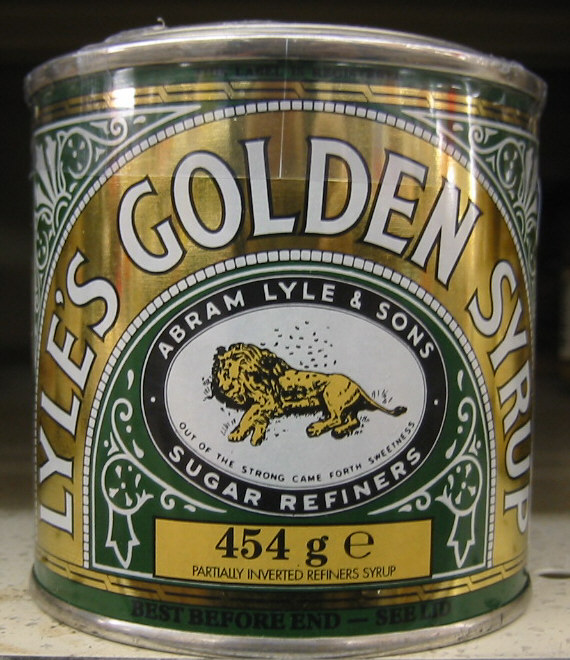
A tin of Lyle's Golden Syrup, first sold in 1885.

An illustration of the lion's corpse with honey bees in it and the second half of the riddle appears prominently on the tin of Lyle's Golden syrup. The slogan was chosen by Abram Lyle, the inventor of golden syrup.

While it is not known exactly why this image and slogan were chosen, Abram Lyle was a deeply religious man, and it has been suggested that they refer either to the strength of the Lyle company or the tins in which golden syrup is sold, or simply to the process of refining sweet syrup from bitter ("strong") treacle.

In 1904, they were registered together as a trademark, and in 2006 Guinness World Records declared the mark to be the world's oldest branding and packaging.

In 2024, the logo was updated for the pouring bottle. The new logo still uses the motif of a lion and a bee but is a clear departure from depicting a lion carcass. The product's canned varieties of syrup will retain the original logo.
