= Jewish assimilation =

Social process or ideology

Jewish assimilation refers either to the gradual cultural assimilation and social integration of Jews in their surrounding culture or to an ideological program in the age of emancipation promoting conformity as a potential solution to historic Jewish marginalization.

== Terminology ==
Modern Jewish History professor Todd Endelman (2015) used the following terms to describe various forms of Jewish assimilation:

- Radical assimilation: 'an umbrella term referring to all the routes Jews traveled to lose their Jewishness, whether that was their intention or not'.
  - Conversion: 'the religious act of formally embracing Christianity'.
  - Secession: 'the act of legally withdrawing from the Jewish community—whether or not conversion to Christianity followed.' Endelman noted that secession did not become available until the late 19th century, and only in Central Europe (German Empire and Austria-Hungary).
  - Intermarriage: 'the union between a Christian and Jew'. Endelman excluded marriages between baptized Jews and Christians or between Jews and ex-Christians from this definition, since they were legally and religiously considered 'endogamous'.
  - Passing: 'the attempt to flee the Jewish community by assuming a non-Jewish identity and hiding evidence of a Jewish birth and upbringing'. According to Endelman, most people in this category never converted to Christianity, because that would have revealed they had once been Jews.

Monika Richarz (2012) argued the importance of distinguishing between assimilation ('radical adjustment, even to the point of absorption') and acculturation ('a less radical and more academic term which implies that people accept a new culture or part of it, but do not give up completely their own tradition').

She stated that the latter term was more appropriate for what Jews did in Western and (to a lesser degree) Eastern Europe in the 19th and early 20th century. Richarz used the term emancipation to mean obtaining 'full citizenship without any conditions', adding that this 'only works if society accepts a minority as equal'.

The term de-Judaization is used to describe manifestations of such assimilation. Examples of such include policies aimed at forcibly erasing the allegedly Jewish character of someone or something, for example the 'de-Judaization (...) of Jewish identity in the Soviet Union', or the 'de-Judaization' (Entjudung) of the sciences in Nazi Germany by sacking Jewish scientists, deleting them from the education canon and removing any other perceived 'Jewish influences', in an attempt to make science 'authentically German'.

In the context of interethnic relations in the State of Israel, the term de-Judaization refers to attempts to achieve equality of its non-Jewish citizens -chiefly Arabs- with its Jewish majority, in light of Israel's national identity as a Jewish and democratic society. In a 1992 debate with Israeli-Jewish intellectual A. B. Yehoshua, Palestinian intellectual Anton Shammas used the term in this emancipatory sense: 'I advocate the de-Judaization and de-Zionization of Israel... I'm asking for a new definition of the word 'Israeli,' so that it will include me as well'.

Michael Shafir (2012) also described the de-emphasis or erasure of the Jewish identity Holocaust victims, such as by assimilating them into a national identity, e.g. by calling them 'Polish citizens', or by reframing them into an international context, e.g. as 'victims of fascism' in the historiography, monuments and memorials of Eastern European Communist regimes (1945–1991) as a negative form of 'de-Judaization', which he argued could lead to "Holocaust trivialization" and empower Holocaust deniers.

== History ==
=== Hellenization ===
In 332 BCE, the Macedonian king Alexander the Great conquered the Levant, where most Jews lived at the time, starting the Hellenistic period. Although Koine Greek became the dominant language of the elite, and the succeeding Ptolemaic Kingdom and Seleucid Empire waged the Syrian Wars for control of the Levant, the Hellenistic rulers mostly did not interfere with the Judeans' culture, religion and internal politics.

After driving out the Ptolemies in 198 BCE, the Seleucid king Antiochus III the Great lowered taxes in the region and formally affirmed the Judeans' religious and political autonomy, stimulating the voluntary Hellenization of especially the upper stratum of the population, such as the clergy, the aristocracy and the merchantry.

Tensions rose after Jason usurped the High Priesthood in Jerusalem and adopted a pro-Hellenic policy in 175 BCE. Three years later, king Antiochus IV Epiphanes expelled Jason and replaced him with Menelaus in order to have him forcefully Hellenise the region.

After reversing a counter-coup by the moderate Jason, Menelaus tried to eradicate the Judaic religion, eventually leading traditionalist orthodox Jews to start the anti-Hellenic Maccabean Revolt (167–160 BCE) against the Seleucids and pro-Hellenic Jews.

After a series of battles, the Seleucids were eventually defeated (also in part due to a Persian invasion in the east), and the Maccabees achieved de facto independence as the Hasmonean dynasty, reversing much of the Hellenization process. The Jewish holiday of Hanukkah stems from this revolt.

The priestly Hasmonean dynasty of the Maccabees and their Sadducee supporters soon fully Hellenized as well in the late 2nd and early 1st century BCE; they were opposed by the Aramaic-speaking traditionalist Pharisees.

Alexandria in Egypt had been an important Hellenistic Jewish cultural centre since its founding in 332 BCE, and by the 1st century CE the city had a large population of Hellenized Jews such as Philo of Alexandria (25 BCE–45 CE).

Some of the Deuterocanonical books that some Jewish and Christian denominations today consider sacred scripture, such as the Wisdom of Solomon (c. 150 BCE), 3 Maccabees (c. 100–50 BCE) and Additions to Esther (1st century BCE), were (probably) written in Jewish Koine Greek in Alexandria by these Hellenized Jews.

Historian Josephus initially participated in the Judean faction of the First Jewish–Roman War (66–73 CE), but surrendered in 67 and settled in Rome, where he wrote The Jewish War (75–79, first in Aramaic, later in Greek) and Antiquities of the Jews (93/4, in Greek).

He tried to reconcile the Jewry with the Greco-Roman world, and although a defender of the Jewish religion and culture against anti-Jewish writers such as Apion (in Against Apion), Josephus rejected Jewish (Judean) nationalism.

=== Age of Enlightenment ===
Use of the vernacular—as opposed to Yiddish or the liturgical Hebrew—is an example of acculturation, one of the key characteristics of Jewish assimilation in the modern era.

Jewish assimilation began anew among Ashkenazi Jews on an extensive scale towards the end of the 18th century in Western Europe, especially Germany, as the Haskalah (also known as Jewish Enlightenment) emerged as a culture.

The orthodox Jewish Berlin-based Moses Mendelssohn (1726–1786) became a leading Haskalah figure, advocating amongst other things for Jews to embrace the German language instead of Yiddish, as well as translating the Hebrew Bible to German.

This had much success especially amongst Western European Jews, who started to abandon Yiddish in favour of the nationally dominant languages, but less amongst Eastern European Jews; for example, Polish rabbis banned Mendelssohn's translation because they believed 'the Bible should only be read in the holy Hebrew language.'

Reasons cited for its initial success included hope for better opportunities accompanying assimilation into the host gentile European communities, especially among the upper classes. "The concentration of the Jewish population in large cities had a strong impact on their lifestyle and made them more visible in the economy and in the culture."

As legal emancipation remained incomplete in the Holy Roman Empire, many upper-middle class urban Jews propagated Enlightenment ideals, which they believed would allow them to improve their social standing: "The ideologues consequently envisioned a regeneration of German Jewry that would gain it equal rights but would also lead to the formation of a new kind of Jew based on its ideal of man."

Both Christian and Jewish communities were divided as to the Jewish question, i.e. to what extent can each nation integrate its Jewish citizens, and if not integrated, how should they be treated?

The breakdown of the traditional Jewish communal structure, the Kehilla, marked the declining perception of a distinct Jewish nationality among those Jews that promoted emancipation. However, attempts to reduce Judaism to a confession did not necessarily induce an increase in tolerance of the Jews on the part of the majority society.

This led some Jews to introspective questions of Jewish identity and who is Jewish. The propriety of assimilation, and various paths toward it were among the earliest internal debates of the emancipation era, including whether and to what extent Jews should relinquish their right to uniqueness in return for civic equality.

As an alternative to a more liberal practice of Judaism, assimilation also took the form of conversion to Christianity. None of the descendants of Moses Mendelssohn retained Judaism. Assimilationists saw Jewish cultural distinctiveness and tribalism as the root of antisemitic hostility and thus felt that Jewish social bonds needed to be weakened.

=== 19th century ===
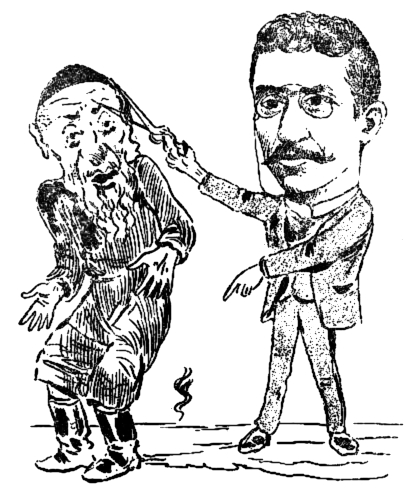
1899 caricature of Romanian Jewish journalist Sache Petreanu, an advocate of assimilation, cutting off the payot of an observant Jew (by Constantin Jiquidi)

During the ancien régime in Europe, the only way to leave Judaism behind was becoming a Christian, but in the 19th century, liberal states such as France, Britain, and the United States started allowing people who were raised Jewish to identify with neither religion, either through religious indeterminacy or by fully embracing irreligion.

In the late 19th century, the German Empire and Austria-Hungary even allowed Jews to change their legal status and formally register as a non-Jew. Historians call this the emancipation era, beginning on 27 September 1791, when Jews in France were first granted full citizenship without any conditions by the French Revolutionary parliament.

Scholars examining the 19th-century emancipation processes of European Jews (also known as the 'integrationist' or 'assimilationist challenge') distinguish between two models:

- Unconditional emancipation, dominant in Western Europe and with some influence in Central Europe (for example, amongst Hungarian liberals Lajos Kossuth and József Eötvös), encouraged individual Jews to voluntarily abandon some or all aspects of their Jewish life and participate in the non-Jewish majority culture, mostly for their own benefit if they so chose.
- Conditional emancipation, dominant in Central and Eastern Europe and with some influence in Western Europe, put social and eventually political pressure on all Jews to abandon some or all aspects of their Jewish life and participate in the non-Jewish majority culture, mostly for the benefit of the majority.
- Finally, the governments of some states, most notably Romania and Russia, showed no significant interest in emancipating, integrating or assimilating the Jewry. Some ethnic nationalist groups elsewhere in Europe, such as the Young Czechs, also doubted the 'assimilability' of the Jews into the nascent Czech nation.

On 14 May 1873, as one of the May Laws in the Kingdom of Prussia (the dominant state of the German Empire), the Austrittgesetz ("law of separation") laid down rules for those Catholics or Protestants who desired to leave their churches, declaring it sufficient for them to manifest their intention before a secular judge.

The initial version of the Austrittgesetz did not allow Jews born in a Jewish community to leave Judaism as a religion, even if they had left the Jewish community socially. As this gave Christians certain rights that were denied to Jews, both liberal and orthodox Jews protested against this legal discrimination and successfully petitioned emperor Wilhelm II to have the law amended, which happened in May 1876: henceforth, a Jew couldn't withdraw from his congregation and still be considered a Jew.

Jewish academics in the nineteenth century partook in social scientific studies concerning antisemitic notions of Jewish degeneration. Their active role in this intellectual discussion served as both a calculated response to antisemitic allegations and a way to explore common social bonds uniting Jews as the autonomous community had been in full decline. Many Jewish social scientists did not entirely disagree with the ideas of distinct Jewish traits conceived by antisemites. This lent itself well to the contentious debate over assimilatory practices.

"The political and social message of this immutable Jewish nature was clear: the 'Jewish body' was racially different and pathological, and opponents of emancipation and integration were correct in insisting that Jews were unfit to be part of a healthy modern nation-state." Participating in the exploration of Jewish lineage can also be seen as a form of appeasement as "It allowed Jewish social scientists to fill the roles of apologist and reformer, to defend their own people based on the knowledge and insights of science."

=== 20th century ===
In the late 19th and early 20th centuries, conditions in Eastern Europe convinced many Jews to emigrate to the United States. In the United States traditional disabilities were generally absent but they faced many different challenges of acculturation. In the early 20th century, there was social discrimination against Jews in certain quarters.

After World War I, antisemitism grew in Europe and America, and worsened by the Great Depression of the 1930s; many universities and professions were barred to Jews or set with a quota limit. Dutch businessman and writer Louis Fles (1872–1940) devoted much of the 1930s as a socialist and a freethinker to both opposing growing Nazi antisemitism on the one hand in Hitler, reformer or criminal? (1933), as well as rejecting Judaism along with all other religions in Water and Fire (1931), Zionism (e.g. in his 1939 pamphlet Down with Zionism!) and ethnic/cultural Jewishness on the other hand. By the 1950s, antisemitism was at an all time low in America. Under government pressure, many universities and professions repealed their anti-Jewish policies.

Fles identified himself as Dutch, argued that Zionism further separated Jews from their non-Jewish Dutch neighbours while reinforcing the image of the Jew as a foreigner, and instead favoured assimilation into the cultures in which Jews found themselves, changing his own Hebrew first name Levi to the European name Louis.

=== 21st century ===
The largest Reform synagogue in New York, Central Synagogue, performs interfaith marriages. Such marriages are conducted to strengthen Jewish continuity (with the aim that the non-Jewish spouse will convert to Judaism).

However, the 2013 study "What happens when Jews intermarry?" explains that children of intermarriage are much more likely to intermarry themselves and much more likely than people with two Jewish parents to describe themselves religiously as atheist, agnostic, or just "nothing in particular."

In Israel, Hitbolelut is a derogatory term used mainly to refer with prejudice to Jewish inter-faith couples, who can be criticized as being anti-Zionist or anti-Israeli, particularly when one partner is Muslim or is identified as being Palestinian or Arab.

== Contemporary debate ==
Ever since some Jews first abandoned traditional Jewish customs to embrace modern secular Western culture in the Age of Enlightenment, more conservative Jews have chastised them for their perceived desertion of the Jewish people. Jewish polemicists engaged in many discussions on Jewish assimilation, while Jewish historians documented the process.

From an international conference on Jewish assimilation held at Haifa University in May 1976, Romano-Hungarian historian Béla Vágó edited a collection of 14 papers entitled Jewish Assimilation in Modern Times (1981); most of these papers accept the Zionist equation of assimilation with Jewish group disappearance.

Reviewing the collection, Marsha L. Rozenblit stated: "Religious Jews regarded those who assimilated with horror, and Zionists campaigned against assimilation as an act of treason. As a result, the term assimilation, used proudly by those who sought integration into European society, became a term of contempt for a symbol of subservience to gentile culture, a sign of rejection of all links to the common history and destiny of the Jewish people.

Modern historians and sociologists, however, have rescued the term from its negative connotations, providing insight into the factor which impelled Jews toward integration, those that effectively blocked total assimilation, and the limits which the Jews themselves placed on the process in order to be both European and Jews."

=== France ===
Paula Hyman's 1998 book The Jews of Modern France, she writes that although "Jewish assimilation" is typically "presumed to reflect the substitution of a French identity for a Jewish one, or perhaps the exchange of a vibrant Judaism for an attenuated one", she argued that this overly simplistic view "does not do justice to the complex processes of transformation of Jewish identity occurring in the modern period", and that "the term assimilation does not allow for the many factors that together forge an individual's identity, for different social contexts in which one or another aspect of identity is expressed, or for the coexistence of the desire for full civic integration with the retention of what we might today call ethnic particularism. Indeed, Jews in the modern world bear multiple identities as members of a minority group and participants in civic culture."

She writes that, although "French Jews were not fully integrated into French society and sought neither the disappearance of their own institutions nor their biological merger with the French population", Jews contributed to and participated in all aspects of French society, including the government and universities, and that far from being simply "passive absorbers of bourgeois French culture, they also participated in its shaping." Following the French Revolution, Jewish emancipation was fundamental to the emergence of a French Jewish identity and the creation of a unified French Jewish community: "Indeed, from the most radical reformers, such as Olry Terquem [...] to the most fervent proponents of traditional Judaism, such as Grand Rabbi Salomon Klein of Colmar, there existed a broad consensus as to the benefits of emancipation and the need to participate in French civic life."

=== Germany ===
In Assimilation and Community: The Jews in nineteenth-century Europe, Marion Kaplan describes how the Jewish identity was maintained and how the German-Jewish identity was formed, specifically through Jewish women and their actions within their families and their communities. Jewish women emphasised their culture and religion by continually observing Jewish traditions and rituals, such as family dinners on Friday evenings and holidays from the Jewish calendar. Strict adherence to Judaism was essential in maintaining their Jewish identity within their household.

Kaplan also stresses the importance of family and community; close-knit families had strong ties with one another. This strong sense of community helped them in protecting and maintaining their culture. However, the ways in which Jews adapted to the culture can be seen in the way Jewish women raised their children in Germany. They encouraged them to take part in sports, learn musical instruments, and read German fairy tales to them. Jewish women also subscribed to German periodicals, following its fashion styles and news.

David Sorkin's The Transformation of German Jewry 1780-1840 assesses what should have been an immensely successful integration process given the Jewish population's great societal contributions as they adopted German secular culture and the bourgeois ideal of individualism known as Bildung.

Instead, a separate German-Jewish subculture developed while emancipation lagged. Sorkin depicts the fruitless attempts of the Jews to be tolerated as no level of self-denial would ultimately prove acceptable to their counterparts.

=== United States ===
Milton Gordon's paper Assimilation in American Life (1964) defined assimilation as a continuum, of which acculturation (meaning 'adoption of such outward cultural forms of the larger society as language, dress, recreational tastes, and political views') is the first phase. Gordon argued that a combination of a receptive host society and high interfaith marriage rates were necessary for total assimilation.

Because most European and American Jews abstained from what Gordon called "structural assimilation" ('the creation of friendships and other contacts primarily with members of the host society'), they 'acculturated', but rarely lost their sense of Jewish identity.

Overall, Rozenblit concluded the 1981 collection was 'interesting', but 'a weak treatment of Jewish assimilation', citing the lack of good definitions of the phenomenon which meant scholars were talking past each other.

The assimilation is the leading cause for the shrinkage of almost all Jewish populations in Western countries since World War II. This shrinkage has been called the Silent Holocaust (in comparison to the genocide against Jews during World War II) by Orthodox Judaism outreach activists such as rabbi Ephraim Buchwald of the National Jewish Outreach Program.

Buchwald said in 1992 that the Jewish community would not be recognizable in 25 to 30 years, going as far as saying: 'We must make certain that young Jews (...) will [be inspired] to live as Jews. (...) If we fail to share with our young Jews the beauty and meaningfulness of Jewish life and Jewish heritage (...) Hitler will have emerged victorious.'

According to the 2000—2001 National Jewish Population Survey, from 1996, 47% of American Jews married a non-Jew. The NJPS survey said that higher levels of education are associated with lower levels of intermarriage.

== Christian–Jewish relations ==
The question of Jewish assimilation is a topic of concern for both Jewish and Christian religious leaders. A number of Progressive Christian denominations have publicly declared that they will no longer proselytize Jews.

Early Christian Europe proved a time and place where Jews and Christians could come together while coexisting socially and creatively amidst the persecution. They were living so closely together in some areas that leaders from both would be worried about the influence one religion had on the other. A Christian monarch in charge of a growing town would invite Jewish merchants to help revitalize the economy.

There was a pattern of expulsion and re-invitation that allowed for the two to live intimately together in smaller towns throughout Europe. Louis the Pious, son of Charlemagne in the Frankish Kingdom, was the first to leave detailed descriptions of the rights of Jewish merchants.

In Spain and Portugal, after the 15th century, there was controversy over the sincerity of Iberian Judeo-Catholics who converted under threat of expulsion from the Peninsula. In Spain and Portugal, descendants of Arabs, Moors, and Jews (moriscos and marranos) were for a period of time banned from certain guilds, positions in the clergy, and particularly from emigrating to Latin America (limpieza de sangre).

This early discrimination system was weaker in Latin America due to the social status that Sub-Saharan African slaves had, much below that of New Christians from the Old World, a contributing factor to the absorption of these elements in the developing culturally pluralistic societies of the New World.

The Roman Catholic Church has attracted some Jews, such as Edith Stein, Israel Zolli, Erich von Stroheim, and Jean-Marie Lustiger.

== See also ==
- Jewish emancipation
- Historical Jewish population comparisons
- Yevsektsiya
- Zera Yisrael
- Apostasy in Judaism
- Criticism of multiculturalism
- On Venus, Have We Got a Rabbi!
- Jewish adjacent
- Jewish visibility
- Ethnic plastic surgery
  - The Operated Jew
- Muscular Judaism
- New Jew
- Secular Jew
- German Jewish military personnel of World War I

== Bibliography ==
- Frankel, Jonathan; Zipperstein, Steven J. (1992). Assimilation and Community: The Jews in Nineteenth-Century Europe. Cambridge University Press.
