= Martin Rosen =

Martin Rosen may refer to:

- Martin Rosen (director), American film director
- Moishe Rosen (born Martin Rosen, 1932–2010), founder of Jews for Jesus
