= Michael Skobac =

Orthodox Jewish Rabbi

Rabbi Michael Skobac

Personal life
- Education: Northwestern University; Yeshiva University
- Occupation: Rabbi, educator, lecturer, counter-missionary activist

Religious life
- Religion: Judaism
- Denomination: Orthodox Judaism

Jewish leader
- Position: Executive Director (Canada)
- Organisation: Jews for Judaism
- Main work: Missionary Impossible: Counter-Missionary Survival Guide; The Da Vinci Code: A Jewish Perspective
- Other: Founding Director of Kiruv, the campus outreach division of the Rabbinical Council of America
- Semikhah: 1980

Rabbi Michael Skobac is a Canadian Orthodox rabbi, educator, and counter-missionary activist who serves as Executive Director of the Canadian branch of Jews for Judaism. He is the author of "Missionary Impossible: The Counter-Missionary Survival Guide".

== Education ==
Skobac studied at Northwestern University and Yeshiva University. He received rabbinic ordination in 1980.

== Career ==
Skobac has been involved in Jewish education and outreach work since 1975. He was the founding director of Kiruv, the campus outreach division of the Rabbinical Council of America, and worked with Hillel organizations in Philadelphia, New York, and Toronto.

Since 1983, Skobac has specialized in counter-missionary work. He established the New York branch of Jews for Judaism and served as a consultant to the New York Jewish Community Relations Council Task Force on Missionaries and Cults.

Skobac joined the Canadian branch of Jews for Judaism full-time in 1992 after relocating from New York to Toronto. He later became Director of Education and Counselling and subsequently Executive Director of the organization's Canadian branch.

As an educator and lecturer, Skobac has spoken extensively on missionaries, cults, Jewish continuity, spirituality, and Jewish-Christian polemics throughout North America, Israel, the United Kingdom, Australia, South Africa, India, and the former Soviet Union. He has provided guidance to Jewish communities internationally on these issues.

He serves on communal and rabbinical bodies in Canada, including the Toronto Board of Rabbis and committees associated with the Canadian Jewish community.

== Publications and media ==
Skobac developed and taught courses on Jewish-Christian polemics and produced educational counter-missionary programs, including The Counter-Missionary Survival Seminar and How to Answer a Christian Missionary.

He is the author of several educational works, including Missionary Impossible: Counter-Missionary Survival Guide and The Da Vinci Code: A Jewish Perspective. He has also written extensively for Jewish publications and appeared on radio and television programs discussing missionary activity, assimilation, and Jewish outreach.

Missionary Impossible: The Counter-Missionary Survival Guide has circulated in more than 100,000 copies.

== Views and public advocacy ==
Skobac has argued that Jewish vulnerability to missionary activity often stems from religious disengagement and a search for spirituality rather than a lack of knowledge alone.

He has been active in public discussions concerning Christian missionary activity, Messianic Judaism, evangelical support for Israel, and Jewish continuity. He has also been cited as an expert on missionary movements and covert proselytizing efforts directed at Orthodox Jewish communities.
