= Jews for Jesus =

Christian missionary organization

- Formation: 1970; 56 years ago (as Hineni Ministries). 1973; 53 years ago (as Jews for Jesus)
- Founder: Moishe Rosen
- Type: Non-profit
- Headquarters: San Francisco, California, U.S.
- Executive Director: Aaron Abramson
- Website: https://jewsforjesus.org/
- Formerly called: Hineni Ministries

Jews for Jesus is an international Christian missionary organization headquartered in San Francisco, United States, that is affiliated with the Messianic Jewish religious movement. The group is known for its proselytism of Jews and promotes the belief that Jesus is the Christ and the Son of God. It was founded in 1970 by Moishe Rosen as Hineni Ministries before being incorporated under its current name in 1973.

Jewish religious and communal authorities do not recognize Jews for Jesus as a Jewish religious organization and regard its belief in Jesus as the Messiah as incompatible with Judaism. Jews for Jesus, however, maintain that belief in Jesus is compatible with Jewish identity. The organization's relationship to Judaism and its reception within Jewish communities have been subjects of longstanding controversy.

== History ==
Jews for Jesus was founded by Moishe Rosen, a Jewish convert to Christianity who later went on to become a Baptist minister in the Hebrew Christian movement and a former member of the American Board of Missions to the Jews (ABMJ). The organization was formed in 1970 under the name "Hineni Ministries" as a subsidiary of the ABMJ. By 1972 they were getting newspaper coverage as "Jews for Jesus", but the affiliation with ABMJ remained. In 1973, Rosen left ABMJ and incorporated his ministry as a 501(c)(3) non-profit organization under the name "Jews for Jesus". Originally, "Jews for Jesus" was one of the organization's several slogans, but after the media began to call the group "Jews for Jesus", the organization adopted the name.

Rosen and members of the organization began their ministry by conducting community outreach on streets and college campuses in San Francisco, California. In the following years, branches were established in New York, Chicago, and Boston. In 1978, Jews for Jesus relocated its headquarters to its current location in San Francisco. In 1981, the organization expanded internationally. According to the organization, as of 2026 it maintains offices in 11 countries and 15 cities around the world.

Rosen remained Executive Director of Jews for Jesus until 1996, when he stepped down to work full-time as a staff missionary. He was replaced by David Brickner, who held the position until May 2024. Aaron Abramson is the current Executive Director and CEO of Jews for Jesus.

== Beliefs ==
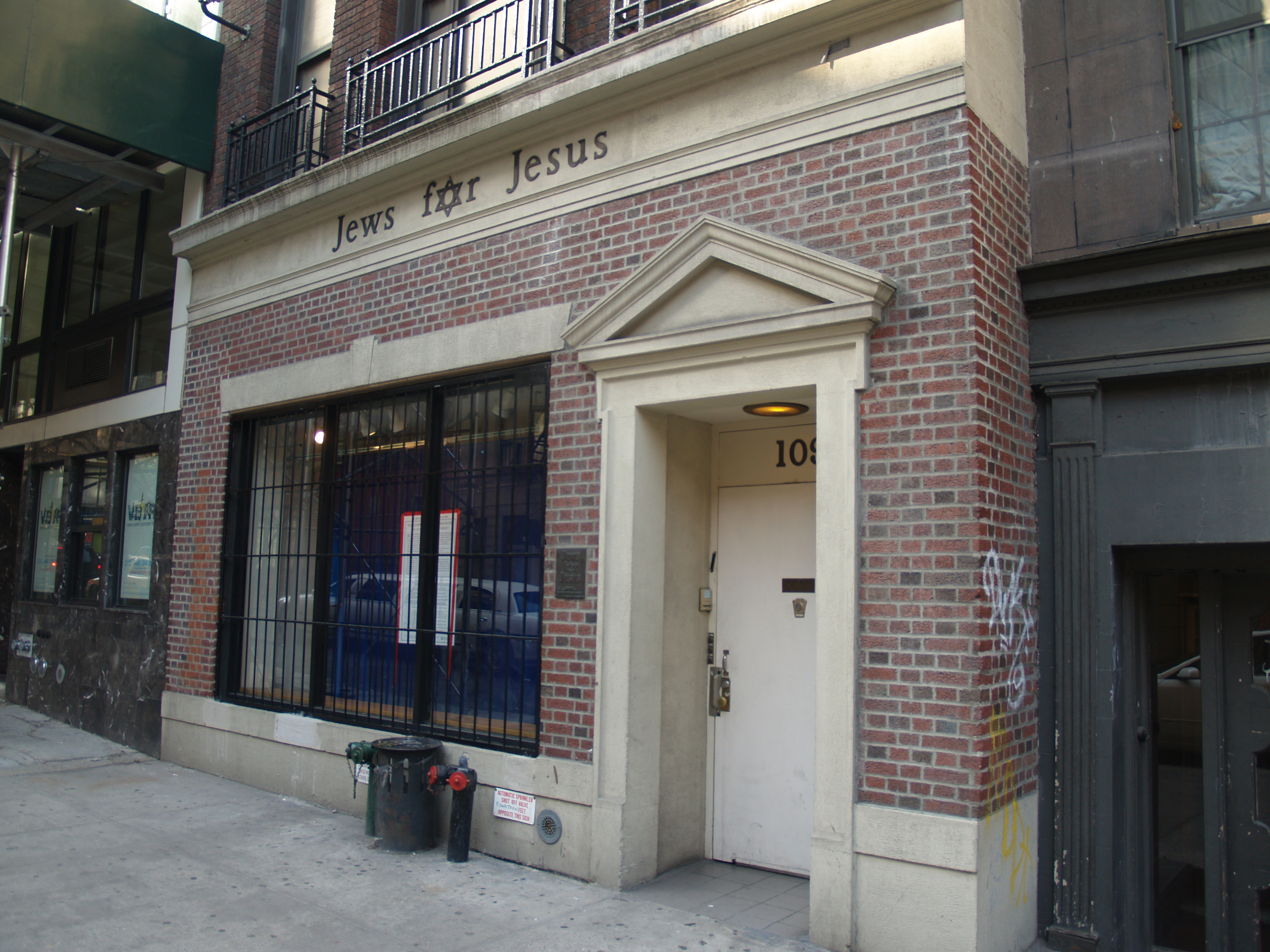
The New York City office of Jews for Jesus

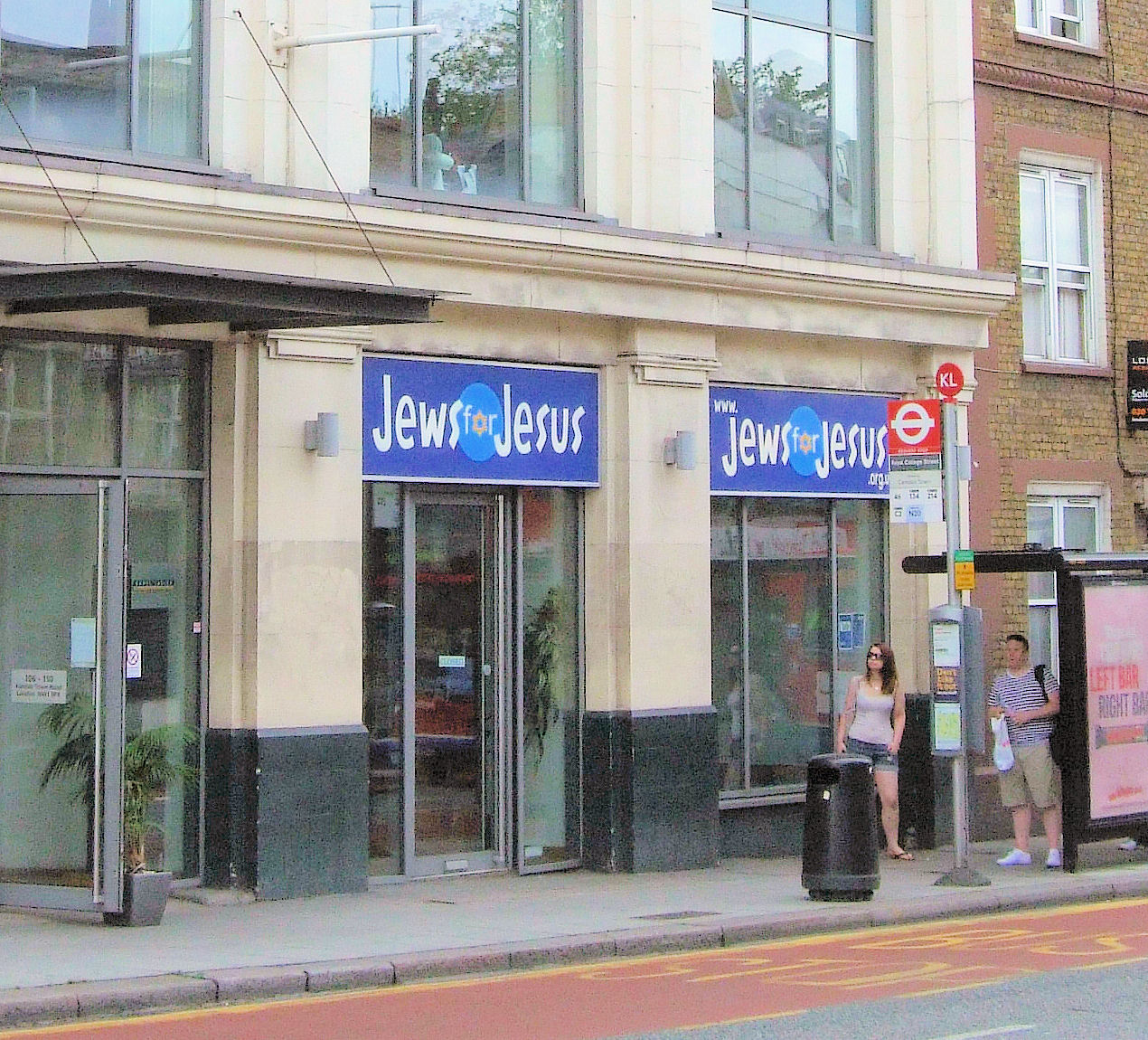
The London office of Jews for Jesus

Jews for Jesus claims that it syncretizes Jewish heritage and Christian faith into spiritual harmony. It believes that faith in Jesus is a viable expression of Jewish life.

The organization summarizes its beliefs in a statement of faith:

- The Old Testament and the New Testament are divinely inspired, without error, and are the final authority in all matters of faith and life. Traditional Jewish literature is in no way binding upon life or faith but of value only where it is supported by or conformable to the Word of God.
- There is one sovereign God, existing in three persons: Father, Son, and Holy Spirit. They believe that this concept is rooted in Judaism.
- Mankind was created in the image of God, but due to sin has been separated from God.
- Jesus is the Messiah and died for the sin of mankind as a substitutionary sacrifice. All who believe in Him have salvation.
- The Church is an elect people in accordance with the New Covenant, comprising both Jews and Gentiles who acknowledge Jesus as Messiah and Redeemer.
- Jesus will return personally in order to consummate the prophesied purposes concerning His kingdom.
- The bodily resurrection of the just and the unjust, the everlasting blessedness of the saved and the everlasting conscious punishment of the lost.

== Operations ==
Jews for Jesus is a registered 501(c)(3) organization. Its headquarters are located in San Francisco, California, and operates offices in New York City, Los Angeles, Toronto, Sydney, Johannesburg, London, Berlin, Paris, Budapest, Kyiv, Odessa, Moscow, Tel Aviv, and Jerusalem.

They are a charter member of the Evangelical Council for Financial Accountability and of MissioNexus.

Jews for Jesus is governed by boards of directors in the United States, Canada, South Africa, Australia, Israel, and Europe.

== Public's perception ==
=== Jewish community's perception ===
Jews for Jesus has a contentious relationship with the Jewish community, and its methods have generated controversy. All Jewish authorities, as well as the governing bodies of the State of Israel, hold the view that Messianic Judaism, the religious movement with which Jews for Jesus is affiliated, is not a sect of Judaism but a form of Christianity. Additionally, Gentiles who convert to Messianic Judaism are not recognized as Jewish by any Jewish movement. However, Jews for Jesus says they "cannot support any efforts by Gentile believers to convert to any type of Judaism."

Some Jews believe that Jesus was a good Jewish teacher, other Jews believe that he was a false prophet, for certain, most Jews believe that he was a failed messiah claimant. Belief in Jesus as deity, Son of God, or even a non-divine Christ/Messiah or prophet (as in Islam), is held as incompatible with Judaism by most Jewish religious movements. However, there has been some debate of that point by Jewish scholars. Daniel Boyarin, a Jewish historian of religion and professor of Talmudic culture at UC Berkeley, writes in one of his books:

Most (if not all) of the ideas and practices of the Jesus movement of the first century and the beginning of the second century—and even later—can be safely understood as part of the ideas and practices that we understand to be "Judaism."... The ideas of Trinity and incarnation, or certainly the germs of those ideas, were already present among Jewish believers well before Jesus came on the scene to incarnate in himself, as it were, those theological notions and take up his messianic calling.

Dan Cohn-Sherbok, a rabbi of Reform Judaism and professor of Jewish Theology at the University of Wales, implies that Messianic Judaism should be embraced in the Jewish community:

...the non-Orthodox rejection of Messianic Jews is more difficult to comprehend given the multidimensional character of contemporary Jewish life ... There is simply no consensus among non-Orthodox Jews concerning the central tenets of the faith, nor is there any agreement about Jewish observance. Instead, the various branches of non-Orthodox Judaism embrace a totally heterogeneous range of viewpoints ... in my view Messianic Judaism constitutes an innovative, exciting, and extremely interesting development on the Jewish scene.

In a 2013 Pew Forum study, 60% of American Jews said that belief in Jesus as the Messiah was not "compatible with being Jewish", while 34% found it compatible and 4% did not know. A 2017 survey that included Messianic Jews "found that 21 percent of Jewish millennials believe Jesus was 'God in human form who lived among people in the 1st century.'" An additional question on faith in the survey found that 14% of participants identified with Christianity, and 10% believed in a hybrid of Christian and Jewish beliefs.

In 1993 the Task Force on Missionaries and Cults of the Jewish Community Relations Council of New York (JCRCNY) issued a statement which has been endorsed by the four major Jewish denominations: Orthodox Judaism, Conservative Judaism, Reform Judaism, and Reconstructionist Judaism, as well as national Jewish organizations. Based on this statement, the Spiritual Deception Prevention Project at the JCRCNY stated:

On several occasions leaders of the four major Jewish movements have signed on to joint statements opposing Hebrew-Christian theology and tactics. In part they said: "Though Hebrew Christianity claims to be a form of Judaism, it is not ... It deceptively uses the sacred symbols of Jewish observance ... as a cover to convert Jews to Christianity, a belief system antithetical to Judaism ... Hebrew Christians are in radical conflict with the communal interests and the destiny of the Jewish people. They have crossed an unbridgeable chasm by accepting another religion. Despite this separation, they continue to attempt to convert their former co-religionists.

The director of counter-missionary group Torah Atlanta, Rabbi Efraim Davidson, stated: "Jews for Jesus use aggressive proselytizing to target disenfranchised or unaffiliated Jews, Russian immigrants and college students," and that "their techniques are manipulative, deceptive and anti-Semitic."

=== Christian community's perception ===
Some Western Christians object to evangelism which is directed at Jews because they believe that Jewish religious practices are valid. Some Liberal Protestant denominations have issued statements criticizing evangelism of Jews including the United Church of Christ and the Presbyterian Church USA, which said in 1988 that Jews have their own covenant with God. The Board of Governors of the Long Island Council of Churches opposes proselytizing, and voiced their sentiments in a statement that "noted with alarm" the "subterfuge and dishonesty" inherent in the "mixing [of] religious symbols in ways which distort their essential meaning," and named Jews for Jesus as one of the three groups about whom such behavior was alleged.

Leighton Ford, a former vice president of the Billy Graham Evangelistic Association and the current president of Leighton Ford Ministries, supports the work of Jews for Jesus:

The first followers of Jesus were all Jews – women and men so touched and changed by him that they had to tell their friends and neighbors ... Like their first century counterparts, the people I know in Jews for Jesus have good news they share lovingly and boldly!

In 2003, the sponsorship of Jews for Jesus by All Souls Church, Langham Place, a conservative evangelical church in London, including a launch event on Rosh Hashanah to start a UK mission targeting the Jewish community, led to the Interfaith Alliance UK, a coalition of Jewish, Christian and Islamic religious leaders, issuing a letter of protest to the Archbishop of Canterbury.

=== Perceptions of other organizations ===
The InterFaith Conference of Metropolitan Washington includes Muslims, Jews, and Christian groups. The leaders of the Conference state that they "support the right of all religions to share their message in the spirit of good will"; however, Rev. Clark Lobenstine has condemned the "proselytizing efforts" of "Jews for Jesus and other messianic Jewish groups." His wording matched the Conference's 1987 "Statement on Proselytism", which makes claims against "groups that have adopted the label of Hebrew Christianity, Messianic Judaism, or Jews for Jesus", so it is unclear which claims are directed at Jews for Jesus in particular.

America's Religions. An Educator's Guide to Beliefs and Practices contains "[a] note about Jews for Jesus, Messianic Jews, Hebrew Christians, and similar groups: Jews in these groups who have converted to Christianity but continue to observe various Jewish practices are no longer considered part of the Jewish community in the usual sense".

Several other organizations oppose the identification of Jews for Jesus as a Jewish group.

=== Controversies ===
==== 1998 and 2005–2006 – Online name ====
Jews for Jesus has been involved in litigation regarding Internet use of its name. In 1998 they sued Steven Brodsky for cybersquatting—registering the domain name jewsforjesus.org for a site criticizing the organization. The domain now belongs to Jews for Jesus and is used for their main site.

In 2005 Jews for Jesus sued Google for allowing a Blogspot user to put up a site at the third-level subdomain jewsforjesus.blogspot.com. In September 2006 Christianity Today reported: "Jews for Jesus settled out of court with a critical blogger identified as 'Whistle Blower' on jewsforjesus.blogspot.com. The evangelistic ministry assumed control of the site."

==== 2006 – misuse of Jackie Mason name ====
In 2006 comedian and actor Jackie Mason filed a lawsuit against Jews for Jesus, alleging that the organization unlawfully distributed a pamphlet that used his name and likeness in a way that suggested he was a member of the group. Jackie Mason was Jewish, but not associated with Jews for Jesus. Jews for Jesus issued a detailed response to the allegation on their website.

A judge of the United States District Court for the Southern District of New York denied a preliminary injunction against Jews for Jesus over the pamphlet, finding the distribution of the pamphlet to be protected by the First Amendment, and also stated that the pamphlet did not suggest that Mason was a Christian.

In December 2006, Mason dropped the lawsuit against Jews for Jesus after they issued a letter of apology to him. The group's executive director, David Brickner, stated in the letter to Mason that he wanted "to convey my sincere apologies for any distress that you felt over our tract." Brickner continued that he believed its publication was protected by the Constitution, but the group was willing in the interest of peace and love for Israel to retire the pamphlet. Mason replied in front of the federal court in Manhattan where he accepted the apology, "There's no such thing as a Jew for Jesus. It's like saying a black man is for the KKK. You can't be a table and a chair. You're either a Jew or a Gentile."

==== That Jew Died for You video ====
In 2014, Jews for Jesus published a three-minute YouTube video called That Jew Died for You, to coincide with Passover, Holy Week and Holocaust Remembrance Day on 28 April. A long-haired Jesus dragging a large wooden cross appears in the film until an Auschwitz concentration camp guard sends him to the gas chambers and says "just another Jew" in German. Jews for Jesus said that the objective of the film was for Jesus to be identified with the victims rather than the perpetrators of the Holocaust and that "the Holocaust has been used – perhaps more than any other event or topic – to prevent Jewish people from considering the good news of Jesus." Jay Michaelson, writing in The Jewish Daily Forward, described it as "the most tasteless YouTube video ever" and wrote: "Not to state the obvious, but it desecrates the memory of six million Jews to use their suffering as a way to convert Jews to Christianity." Fox News Channel and History refused to play an advertisement for the film.

==== Jerusalem coffee shop open on Shabbat ====
As of 2026 Café Basimta is a coffee shop in Jerusalem that is owned by Jews for Jesus. It is open on Shabbat, despite many other shops and cafés in the area being closed on that day. It drew attention in the media after large groups of Haredim protested its decision to open on Shabbat. Support for the coffee shop from secular Israelis was initially strong, but lessened somewhat after its connection to Jews for Jesus became known. The soccer club Hapoel Jerusalem made an offer of free advertising to the café but later withdrew it. The anti-missionary group Or LeAchim announced plans to protest Café Basimta's missionary ties, but Jews for Jesus said that the coffee shop serves customers without proselytizing, although it does provide opportunities to discuss religion.

As of early September 2026, following two months of weekly protests, Café Basimta's management announced it would no longer be open on Shabbat. Jews for Jesus CEO Eli Birnbaum called it a "difficult and painful decision," stemming from a responsibility to the cafe's customers, the organization's faith, and Israeli society as a whole. However, the Haredi anti-missionary organization Yad L'Achim said it would continue picketing the cafe until it closes entirely, stating it would "not rest until... the missionary taint is removed from the holy city of Jerusalem."

=== First Amendment litigation ===
Jews for Jesus has been involved with a number of legal conflicts involving free speech and the First Amendment. These include leafleting at Los Angeles International Airport; caricaturing Jackie Mason in a pamphlet; handing out pamphlets in a public park on Long Island; a lawsuit from a Florida woman claiming that Jews for Jesus wrongly identified her as a Christian in its publications; the use of the Curious George image in Jews for Jesus leaflets. and a lawsuit filed by Jews for Jesus against a New York group of religious agencies who criticized the organization in a mass mailing.

== References in popular culture ==
- Interiors (1978 film)
- Airplane!, 1980
- The New Yorker, 25 October 2004. Roz Chast.
- Moral Orel (2005-2012 Adult Swim animated series)
- In Her Shoes (2005 film)
- Esquire magazine, 2014.
- Curb Your Enthusiasm, 2021.
- Clem Snide's 2005 song "Jews for Jesus Blues"

== See also ==
- Michael L. Brown
- Christianity and Judaism
- Jesus in Christianity
- Jewish views on Jesus
- Religious perspectives on Jesus
- Jews for Judaism
- New religious movement
- Tovia Singer
