= Yad L'Achim =

Jewish outreach organization

Yad L'Achim (Hebrew: יד לאחים, "hand for brothers") is a Haredi Jewish organization operating in Israel focusing on outreach, counter-missionary work, and opposition to interfaith marriage. Yad L'Achim is made up of both paid staff and volunteers, and is largely supported by donations, both from Israel and the Diaspora.

The organization opposes Arab-Jewish marriages, aiming to remove Jewish women and children from what it describes as abusive relationships with Arab men. They claim these operations are initiated based on requests from the women themselves or their concerned family members. The group has faced allegations of harassment and persecution from Christian missionaries in Israel, who claim to have been targeted by Yad L'Achim for their proselytizing activities. Critics claim that the organization's methods are aggressive and infringe on religious freedoms, leading to tensions within the diverse religious landscape of Israel.

== History ==
Yad L'Achim was formed in 1950, with the stated goal of "helping new immigrants to the newly-born country to find a suitable religious framework". Over time, the founders were disturbed by emerging missionary efforts in the new State, and then, later, by assimilation. It then shifted a major part of its activities to combatting these two issues. Yad L'Achim has other departments as well, including one devoted to the spiritual absorption of immigrants from the Commonwealth of Independent States, and one that helps enroll children in religious schools.

== Beliefs ==
Yad L'Achim adheres to Haredi Judaism.

== Counter-missionary activity ==
Yad L'Achim's main focus is counter-missionary opposition to efforts to convert Jews to Christianity. Yad L'Achim claims that over 100 missionary congregations and cults are currently active in Israel. The Israel government co-operates to some degree with Yad L'Achim in discouraging proselytizing, which is technically legal unless a minor is targeted without parental consent.

Yad L'Achim demanded that Pope Benedict XVI act to reveal the "hidden Jewish children" of the Holocaust.

== Opposition to Arab-Jewish marriages ==
Yad L'Achim's stated aim is to rescue Jewish women and children in abusive relationships with Arab men. They respond to requests from the women themselves, or concerned family members. Since its inception, it has rescued thousands of women and children from situations of abuse. The organization also provides shelter for the women and children after rescue.

Convicted murderer Yaakov Teitel has stated that he participated in 25 "rescue missions" for the group, but Yad L'Achim has strongly denied this.

In 2010, Yad L'Achim helped rescue an Israeli woman and her four children from her abusive husband. Her family had contacted Yad L'Achim after she spoke to them from Gaza, complaining about her husband's abusive and violent behavior. In 2019, the organization helped re-unite an Israeli woman with her son who was abducted as a child by his Palestinian father 30 years prior.

== Harassment of Christian missionaries in Israel ==
Christian missionaries in Israel have repeatedly complained of being "persecuted, harassed, threatened, and attacked" by Yad L'Achim and a similar group, Lev L'Achim. These complaints, as well as slow response time by the authorities, are a continued matter of concern to the U.S. State Department, as described in their Annual Report on International Religious Freedom for 1999: Israel, and repeatedly in the State Department's Bureau of Democracy, Human Rights, and Labor's annual International Religious Freedom Report, most recently in the 2009 report.

The State Department notes in its 2001 report, however, that the negativity toward proselytizing of Israeli Jews goes beyond that towards Yad L'Achim:

Societal attitudes toward missionary activities and conversion generally are negative. Israeli Jews frequently are opposed to missionary activity directed at Jews and occasionally are hostile toward Jewish converts to Christianity. Such attitudes often are attributed to the frequent periods in Jewish history in which Jews were coerced to convert to Christianity.

Jehovah's Witnesses filed over 120 complaints about instances of harassment by Jewish groups during 1998 and 1999; yet, there have been no indictments or prosecutions. At the same time, a member of the Jehovah's Witnesses was arrested and charged with "offending religious sensitivity" for distributing religious literature at Tel Aviv's bus station on March 1, 1999. The complainant was a Yad L'Achim member. The Jehovah's Witness claimed he was being singled out for prosecution because he had filed five complaints against Yad L'Achim.

Many Jews, however, approve of Yad L'Achim's counter-missionary activities.

== See also ==
- Jews for Judaism
- Tovia Singer
- Penina Taylor
- Lehava
- Assimilation
- Proselytization and counter-proselytization of Jews
- Jewish fundamentalism
