= Jewish adjacent =

Jewish adjacent is a term referring to people who are non-Jewish yet maintain a connection to Judaism or Jewish cultural life. People who are "Jewish adjacent" often participate in Jewish holidays and rituals alongside their Jewish family members and friends. The term is also sometimes used to refer to non-Jewish people who have Jewish ancestry.

== About ==
The term is often used to refer to non-Jewish people who have Jewish spouses or children, though is also used to refer to non-Jewish people with Jewish grandparents, in-laws, step-relatives, or other family members.

At the 2019 URJ Bienniel, Rabbi Richard Jacobs, the head of the Union for Reform Judaism, delivered a speech advocating the inclusion of Jewish adjacent people. Quoting Isaiah 54:2, which says to "Enlarge the site of your tent", Jacobs said that "the future of the Jewish people requires us to follow Isaiah’s vision and “extend the tent of Jewish life.”"

== See also ==
- Conversion to Judaism
- Gentile
- Goy
- Jewish assimilation
- Jewish culture
- Jewish identity
- Reform Judaism outreach
- Jüdisch versippt
- Interfaith marriage in Judaism
