= American Board of Missions to the Jews =

The American Board of Missions to the Jews (ABMJ) was during the 1930s and 1940s the largest Christian mission proselytizing to Jews in America. In 1984, the organization changed its name to Chosen People Ministries.

In 1973, messianic evangelist Moishe Rosen left the organization to create Hineni Ministries, which is now known as Jews for Jesus. His aggressive style earned condemnation in 1975 from his former employer as well as the Fellowship of Christian Testimonies to the Jews. Chosen People Ministries is now a cooperating partner with Jews for Jesus.
