= Association for the Protection of Mixed Families' Rights =

Association for the Protection of Mixed Families Rights (AMF) is a grassroots organization that helps interfaith families and their descendants in Israel.

== History ==
Established in 1999, AMF addresses the legal challenges presented by the Law of Return and manages programs that include a hotline for people in three languages, providing them with information regarding their religious classification and assistance with legal and bureaucratic issues that affect civil status as well as advocacy and lobbying. The association has also conducted sociological surveys concerning mixed families and held conferences based on the Naturalization and integration challenges for mixed families.
