= Aaron Abramson =

American-born Israeli missionary and non-profit executive

- Born: Detroit, Michigan
- Education: All Nations Christian College; New York University
- Occupation: CEO of Jews for Jesus
- Spouse: Victoria Abramson
- Children: 3

Aaron Abramson is an American-born Israeli missionary and the chief executive officer (CEO) of Jews for Jesus.

== Early life and education ==
Abramson was born in Detroit in 1974, the son of a Jewish father and a Catholic mother. He grew up in Seattle, but he and his family moved to Israel when he was 15 years old. He studied for one year in an Orthodox yeshiva, and then at 18 he was drafted into the Israeli military where he served for 3 years.

Abramson has a bachelor's degree from All Nations Christian College and a master's degree (MPA) from New York University.

== Career ==
Abramson has worked for Jews for Jesus as a missionary and executive since 1998. He has also worked for the organization as director of recruitment and as the director of the New York branch. In 2019 he was appointed COO of Jews for Jesus, and then in 2024 he was named CEO, the third executive director in the history of the organization and the first with an Israeli background.

== Personal life ==
Abramson is married with three children.

== Selected publications ==
- Abramson, Aaron (2025). Mission Design: Leading Your Ministry through Organizational and Cultural Change. IVP. ISBN 978-1514013069.
