= Penina Taylor =

- Occupations: Author; lecturer; inspirational speaker
- Works: Scripture Twisting; Coming Full Circle: A Jewish Woman's Journey through Christianity and Back
- Spouse: Paul Taylor
- Website: peninataylor.com

Penina Taylor is an American-born international Jewish inspirational and motivational speaker, life coach, and author. She became well known for the story of her spiritual journey, but now speaks on topics related to personal growth and marriage, as well as spirituality. Penina is the executive director of the Shomrei Emet Institute for Counter-Missionary Studies, and the founder of Torah Life Strategies. Shomrei Emet was briefly affiliated with the counter-missionary organization, Jews for Judaism, Jerusalem, during 2008.

Since November 2018, Taylor has hosted a weekly podcast called "Leap of Faith" on IsraelTalkNewsRadio.com, a Fox News Radio affiliate.

== Early life ==
=== Conversion to Christianity ===
Penina was born into a secular Jewish home in Lakewood Township, New Jersey. After a traumatic childhood, Penina embraced Christianity in high school, and then went on to Miami Christian College (Now Trinity University) where she obtained a Bible Certificate. In college, Penina became certified in the Evangelism Explosion (EE) program, was trained and served as a counselor with the Billy Graham Crusade several times, and was certified as a "crisis pregnancy counselor".

Shortly after leaving Miami Christian College, Penina married Paul Taylor, who had attended Moody Bible Institute, and the two of them continued to serve in lay leadership positions in a variety of churches.

=== Messianic Judaism ===
In 1991, Paul and Penina became involved in the Messianic movement, and in 1994, along with Penina's parents, started the Messianic congregation, Knesset Hashuvim, in Bowie, Maryland. During this time, Penina began reading books about Orthodox Judaism, and the four leaders adopted the concept of "Torah-Observant Messianic Judaism". Penina's father, Yeshayahu Heiliczer, established the "Association of Torah-Observant Messianics", or ATOM.

=== From "Messianic Judaism" to Orthodox Judaism ===
After moving to Baltimore, Maryland, in 2000, while still "Messianic Jews", Paul and Penina began to attend an Orthodox synagogue where they were introduced by the rabbi to the (then) director of Jews for Judaism, Mark Powers. As a result of their discussion with Mark, Penina rejected Jesus as the Jewish messiah, and adopted Orthodox Judaism.

== Later career ==
In 2009, Penina published her first book, Coming Full Circle: A Jewish Woman's Journey through Christianity and Back, which narrates her spiritual journey through Evangelical Christianity, "Messianic Judaism", and, finally, Orthodox Judaism.

In 2011, Penina published her second book, Scripture Twisting, which examines Christian claims for the messiahship of Jesus, and the Jewish response to these claims.

In addition to publishing her books, Penina lectures and teaches around the world at Jewish centers, seminaries, and yeshivas, discussing her religious journey at synagogues and with youth groups, engaging in Jewish polemics against Messianic-Christian interpretations of the Hebrew Bible, and opines on the nature of the relationship between Israel and Evangelical Christianity.

More recently, Penina has been teaching on personal growth, marriage, and relationships.

== See also ==
- Baal teshuva
- Proselytization and counter-proselytization of Jews
- Tovia Singer
