= Tovia Singer =

American rabbi (born 1960)

Rabbi Tovia Singer טוביה זינגר
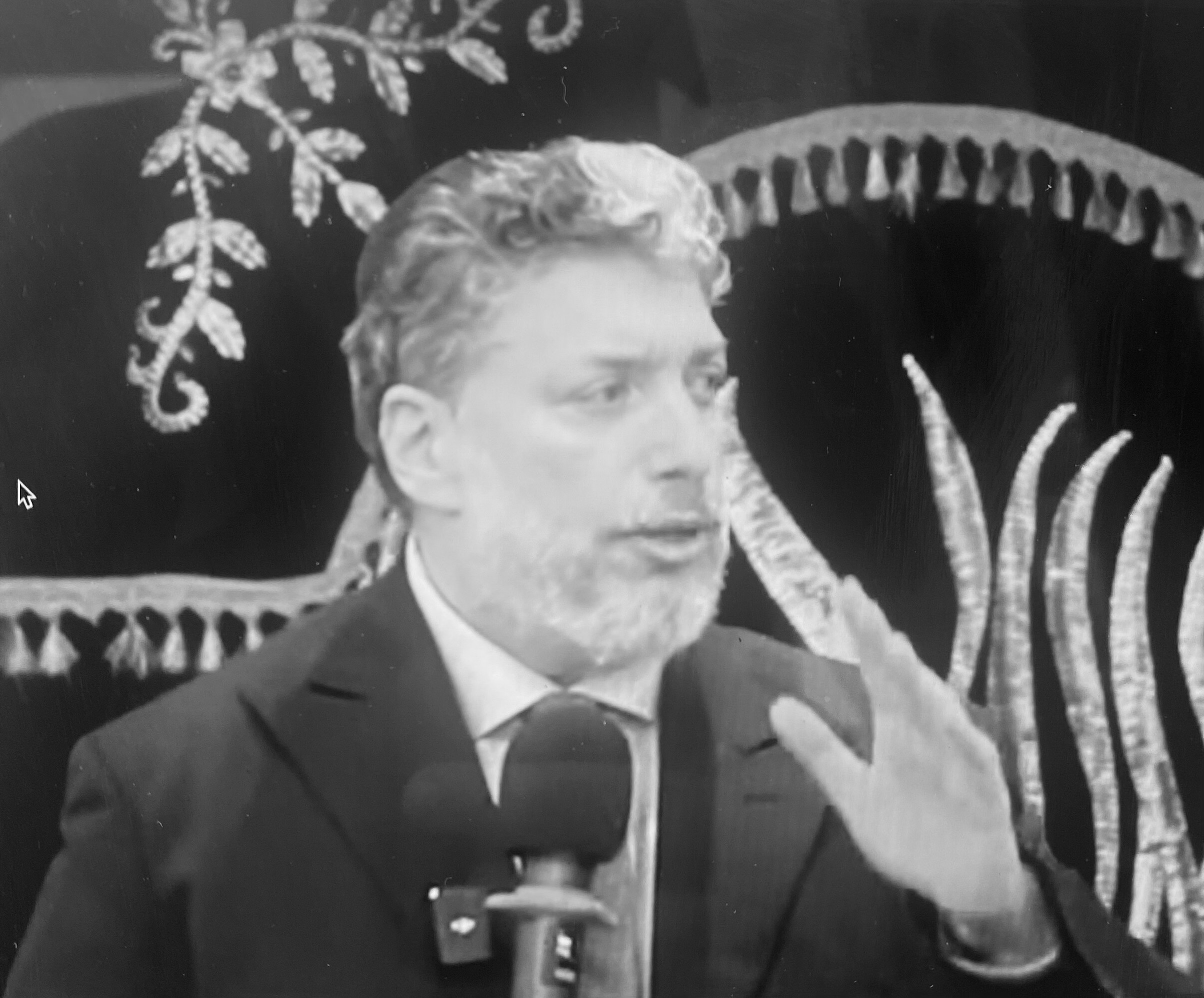
- Rabbi Tovia Singer in 2024
- Title: Founder and director of Outreach Judaism (a counter-missionary organization)

Personal life
- Born: September 20, 1960 (age 65) Pennsylvania, U.S.
- Education: Mir
- Occupation: Rabbi
- Website: www.outreachjudaism.org

Religious life
- Religion: Judaism
- Denomination: Orthodox Judaism

Jewish leader
- Synagogue: Beit Torat Chaim; Jakarta, Indonesia
- Organisation: Outreach Judaism

Rabbi Tovia Singer (Hebrew: טוביה זינגר; born September 20, 1960) is an American Orthodox rabbi and the founder and director of Outreach Judaism. Outreach Judaism is managed under the Eits Chaim Indonesia Foundation, which describes itself as an advocate for the Jewish faith, the Jewish people, and the State of Israel. After five years in Indonesia, Singer moved to Jerusalem in 2019 where he now lives in the Jewish quarter of the Old City.

== Outreach Judaism ==
Singer is the founder and director of Outreach Judaism, a Jewish counter-missionary organization. It describes itself as "an international organization that responds directly to the issues raised by missionaries and cults, by exploring Judaism in contradistinction to fundamentalist Christianity." Singer cautions regarding congregations that "are designed to appear Jewish, but are actually fundamentalist Christian churches, which use traditional Jewish symbols to lure the most vulnerable of our Jewish people into their ranks." Outreach Judaism was described by J. Gordon Melton in 2002 as an example of "the current state of Jewish counter-cult activity."

== Other activities ==
From 2002 to 2010 Singer hosted The Tovia Singer Show on Arutz Sheva's Israel National Radio. The show launched again in October 2013. The radio show had many prominent guests, including Israeli and American politicians, rabbis, terror victims, and authors. Among those who came on the show were: 47th Governor of Texas Rick Perry; American stand-up comedian in political satire, Jackie Mason; former US ambassador for the UN, John R. Bolton; businessman Ronald Lauder; Israeli Ambassador Dore Gold; American-born Israeli historian, author and politician, Michael Oren; Dead Sea Scroll expert Prof. Lawrence Schiffman; American conservative political activist, Alan Keyes; Israeli politician, Danny Danon; former American ambassador and an ardent anti-communist, Jeane Kirkpatrick and many others. Singer was also one of the first who interviewed Walid Shoebat. In 2006, Singer interviewed Wafa Sultan on the show.

Singer is the author of the book and audio series Let's Get Biblical: Why Doesn't Judaism Accept the Christian Messiah?. His new expanded edition is a two-volume book that takes a critical look at long-standing Christian charges against the Jewish faith. According to David Brickner it has "grabbed the attention of many evangelicals simply because it has been so widely distributed." A book review by Jewish Values Online described Singer as "a master of his material" and that "his meticulous research and command of Biblical sources is most impressive."

Together with Eits Chaim Indonesia Foundation, whose founders are of Dutch Jewish descent, Singer started the only Jewish Center legally acknowledged by the Indonesian Minister of Religious Affairs - Torat Chaim. Since Judaism is not yet a recognized religion in Indonesia, religious freedom for Torat Chaim and its members is guaranteed and protected by the Christian Desk of the Indonesian Religious Affairs Department.

On November 25, 2022, The Jerusalem Post reported that Lihi Lapid, the wife of Prime Minister Yair Lapid, sued Singer for reporting a claim by missionary Chaim Malespin that Mrs. Lapid believes in Jesus. Lapid claimed that Singer apologized for this, which Singer denied in a response published in the Jerusalem Post on November 27. Lapid's claim was for £190,000; Singer countersued Lapid for defamation for £72,000. Both suits are pending.

== Works ==
- Singer, Tovia (2010). Let's Get Biblical. RNBN Publishers; 2nd edition (2010). ISBN 978-0615348391.

== See also ==
- Guma Aguiar
- History of the Jews in Indonesia
- Jews for Judaism
- Kiruv
- Penina Taylor
- Yad L'Achim
- Orthodox Judaism outreach
- Baal teshuva
- Jewish fundamentalism
