= Yosef Mizrachi =

Israeli-American rabbi (born 1968)

Rabbi Yosef Mizrachi
- יוסף מזרחי

Personal life
- Born: 1968 (age 57–58) Jaffa, Israel
- Occupation: Rabbi; public speaker
- Website: www.divineinformation.com

Religious life
- Religion: Judaism
- Denomination: Haredi

Jewish leader
- Residence: Monsey, New York, U.S.

Yosef Mizrachi (Hebrew: יוסף מזרחי; born 1968) is an Israeli-American Haredi rabbi and public speaker. Described as a prominent kiruv rabbi, he has drawn widespread criticism and denunciation from leading Orthodox Jewish authorities over his controversial public statements.

== Biography ==
Yosef Mizrachi was born in Jaffa, Israel, to a secular Persian-Jewish family and raised in Bat Yam. He completed his military service in the Israeli Air Force and moved to New York in 1989, where he worked at a bagel store and later in finance. After becoming an observant Jew (baal teshuva), he moved to Monsey, and in 1997 began studying and eventually teaching Torah at the Ohr Yisrael Yeshiva. He began producing kiruv videos that appeared online in 2004. Mizrachi was an early adopter of social media for Orthodox Jewish outreach, aimed especially at non-religious audiences.

== Controversies ==
In early 2014, before a lecture tour in London, concern was expressed about statements by Mizrachi in his previous lectures relating to the behaviour of secular and religious Jews during the Holocaust, and suggesting that Down syndrome and autism are "punishments for sins committed in a previous life", among others. Mizrachi responded saying he was taken out of context and he would never disrespect people with disabilities. As a result, at least one of his planned lectures in London was initially cancelled.

Mizrachi has claimed that Jews helped bring about the Holocaust by assimilating. In December 2015, in one of his lectures, Mizrachi claimed that it is possible that only one million Jews were murdered in the Holocaust as opposed to the well accepted figure of 6 million, since many of them were not Jewish according to Jewish law which requires a person's mother to be Jewish. He was criticized by academics and Jewish leaders including Efraim Zuroff, director of the Simon Wiesenthal Center, who said that he "made up history to suit an agenda." Later, Mizrachi issued an apology.

In 2016, UK Chief Rabbi Ephraim Mirvis spoke out against Mizrachi's planned visit to Britain and described him as a "Jewish hate preacher". Mizrachi has been barred from entering the UK by the Home Office. In December of that year, 16 prominent US rabbis issued an open letter about Mizrachi, saying that he "reduce[s] complex issues to simplistic and misleading sound bites," and that his assertions are "objectionable, and even dangerous." The letter continued that institutions should be more "discerning" with the guests they invite.

Following the October 2018 Pittsburgh synagogue shooting, Mizrachi repeated a false rumor that the attack occurred during a bris for the child of a same-sex couple, asserting that the congregation's conduct brought about the massacre.

In March 2019, a planned visit by Mizrachi to the UK was canceled following reports that the Home Office was considering a ban on account of his track record of spreading hatred and extremism. Mizrachi blamed Mirvis and Senior Rabbi Joseph Dweck for the tour's cancellation, claiming both promoted homosexuality and that Mirvis would "bring a Holocaust on the Jews in England."

In April 2020, during the COVID-19 pandemic, Mizrachi claimed that blowing hot air from a hair dryer into the throat was a cure for coronavirus. He recommended this treatment five times a day for two days for confirmed cases, and twice a day for suspected cases.

In July 2020, a video from Mizrachi calling 14 prominent rabbis infidels was removed from social media platforms and prompted calls to have his videos removed more broadly from Jewish sites such as Torah Anytime for fear that it will incite violence. Natan Slifkin, one of the rabbis threatened in the video said, "We need to protest this hateful, potentially violence-inciting rhetoric."

In December 2022, former Israeli Prime Minister Naftali Bennett filed a defamation lawsuit against Mizrachi after Mizrachi claimed in lectures that Bennett's mother was not Jewish according to Halakha. Mizrachi called Bennett a 'devil' who should be 'skewered', as well saying that he would welcome then finance minister Avigdor Liberman’s death. In September 2023, the Tel Aviv Magistrate's Court ruled against Mizrachi, ordering him to pay compensation to Bennett and publish an apology and retraction on his YouTube channel.

In March 2026, a clip from a lecture by Mizrachi gained attention after it was featured by political commentator Tucker Carlson. In the video, Mizrachi suggested that an attack on the Al-Aqsa Mosque could be blamed on Iran to clear the site for the Third Temple. Mizrachi denied supporting military action against the mosque, saying the clip was taken out of context and that Jewish tradition ties the Third Temple to a future messianic era.

In September 2026, Mizrachi questioned the Islamic concept of tawhid by lambasting Iranian Shiites in a video where they called upon Ali – a practice known as tawassul – on a turbulent Sepehran Airlines flight: "Scream Allah, why'd you scream Ali?".

== Works ==
- Mizrachi, Yosef (2022). Divine Information: Your Ticket to Eternal Life. ISBN 979-8-4479-7532-6.
- Mizrachi, Yosef (2019). Preparation for Eternal Life: The Truth of the Holy Torah, Judaism, Ethics and Repentance. HaKeter Institute. ISBN 979-8-4955-4424-6.

== See also ==
- Jewish fundamentalism
