= New Jew =

New Jew may refer to:

== Schools ==
- New Community Jewish High School, in West Hills, California
- Gann Academy: The New Jewish High School of Greater Boston, in Waltham, Massachusetts
- Weber School, formerly New Atlanta Jewish Community High School, in Sandy Springs, Georgia

== Other ==
- Heeb: The New Jew Review, a magazine
- Sabra (person), a Jew born in Israeli territory
- Muscular Judaism, a Zionist concept of a Jew who has rejected the thinking of the diaspora
