= Wasilla Bible Church =

Evangelical Christian church in Alaska

- Location within Alaska

Religion
- Affiliation: Non-denominational, evangelical Christian
- Leadership: Ashley Brown, Senior Pastor
- Status: Active

Location
- Location: Wasilla, Alaska
- Interactive map of Wasilla Bible Church
- Coordinates: 61.582770°N 149.493892°W

Website
- wasillabible.org

Wasilla Bible Church is a non-denominational, evangelical Christian church located in Wasilla, Alaska.

== History ==
Wasilla Bible Church was founded in 1977. It asked Larry Kroon to become pastor in 1978.

Wasilla Bible Church's first building in Wasilla was completed in 1979 at the former location of the Wasilla Assembly of God, which had moved to different location. The original church's capacity was 250 seats. A second story was added in 1984, and a larger sanctuary was added in 1996. The property was then sold to another church, enabling Wasilla Bible Church to buy 20 acres (81,000 m^{2}) of land elsewhere in Wasilla. The new church building was dedicated on October 1, 2006. The church hosts up to 1,000 parishioners. Wasilla Bible Church's former location became the home of a different church, King's Chapel.

As of 2020 Ashley Brown serves as head Pastor and Chairman of Wasilla Bible Church's Elders.

== Beliefs ==
Its beliefs are non-denominational and evangelical.

Wasilla Bible Church website lists five "Core Commitments" at its website, "The Centrality of Christ, The Authority of Scripture, The Priority of Prayer, Authenticity in our Spiritual Life, [and] Community in our Congregational Life".

In 2008, Pastor Larry Kroon describes the congregation as "socially conservative".

=== Media scrutiny and controversy ===
Following nomination of congregant and then-governor of Alaska Sarah Palin as candidate for Vice President of the United States, Wasilla Bible Church became a focus of the media. "When a presidential candidate surprises the country with a relatively unknown choice, then all hell breaks loose," Larry Sabato said. "It did with Ferraro, it did with Quayle, it's happening with Palin."

A Time correspondent reported a Wasilla Bible Church program insert announcing a program to help gays "overcome" their homosexuality. Then pastor, Larry Kroon, responded to this article in a Fox News interview on September 9, 2008. When Fox reporter Greta Van Susteren asked for comment about inclusion of the announcement, Pastor Kroon replied, "When the subject of homosexuality comes up, people that matter to me come to mind. And over the past year, I've had different people in our congregation speak of homosexuals in ways that I did not want to hear our people speak. ... And I wanted my people, if at all possible, to hear somebody in their tone and their manner because I don't think the church has done a very good job of speaking of this issue in a gracious tone and manner."

=== Arson ===
On the evening of December 12, 2008, the church building was damaged by a still unknown arsonist with damage estimated at $1 million. An accelerant was poured around the entrances while five women were inside; they escaped without serious injury. Palin apologized to her fellow church members in case the fire was connected to "undeserved negative attention" Wasilla Bible Church has received since she became the vice presidential candidate on August 29.

== Notable congregants ==
- Sarah Palin, former Alaska Governor and 2008 Republican vice-presidential candidate.
- Wes Keller, Wes Keller (born April 24, 1946) is a Republican member of the Alaska House of Representatives, representing the 14th District. ... Keller is a member of the American Legislative Exchange Council (ALEC), serving as Alaska state leader.
