= Jüdisch versippt =

Nazi German term for "Aryans" married to Jews

During the National Socialist era, "Aryan persons" who lived in so-called "mixed marriages" with a "Jewish person" were referred to as "jüdisch versippt" (family ties to Jews). "Jüdisch Versippte" were discriminated against; they were excluded from certain professions and career opportunities, dismissed from public service, and, from 1943, were deemed as "unworthy of military service" and were used for quartered forced labor in "Sonderkommandos" (special forces) of the Organization Todt.

In antisemitic laws, ordinances, and decrees, the term "jüdisch versippt" is usually paraphrased so that it could be clearly determined whether "half Jews" ("first-degree Jewish hybrids") were being referred to, in addition to the so-called "full Jews". Radical antisemites agitated against their legal betterment, and often succeeded in including the "German-blooded" partner married to a "half-Jew" in persecution measures. Joseph Goebbels also intended to exclude the cultural workers who were married to a "Jewish half-breed of the second degree" ("quarter Jews").

== Uncertainty of the term ==
The first legal definition of the term "non-Aryan" can be found in the First Ordinance on the Implementation of Law for the Restoration of the Professional Civil Service of 11 April 1933 (RGBl. I p. 195): "Anyone who descends from non-Aryan, especially Jewish, parents or grandparents shall be deemed non-Aryan. It is sufficient if one parent or one grandparent is not Aryan." This definition was decisive in the first phase of discrimination from 1933 to 1935. The broad interpretation of the term "not Aryan" led to the stigmatization of "half-Jews" and "quarter Jews", as well as "full Jews". Accordingly, the derogatory term "jüdisch versippt" was also interpreted as such.

It was not until November 1935, when further rules were written in the First Ordinance to the Reich Citizenship Act, that the discrimination of all "non-Aryans" ended. "Jewish hybrids" were legally better off. Until 1937, "Jewish hybrids" remained unchallenged with regard to their economic activities, and largely unaffected by the prohibitions and restrictions on professions directed against "non-Aryans". "Second-degree Jewish hybrids" were placed on an almost equal legal footing with "Aryans". Later laws and ordinances directed against "arisch Versippte" ("Aryan infested") only exceptionally concerned those "Aryans" who were married to a "quarter Jew".

== Before the Nuremberg Laws (1935) ==
The first legal provision restricting the professional existence of the "German-blooded" partner in a "mixed marriage" was enacted on 30 June 1933, and concerned prospective civil servants. After that, it was not allowed to appoint a Reich civil servant who was "married to a person of non-Aryan descent". A later marriage to a "person of non-Aryan descent" resulted in the dismissal.

On 6 September 1933, the General Synod of the Evangelical Church of the Old Prussian Union passed a church law concerning the legal relations of clergy and church officials. Accordingly, clergy and officials of the general church administration who were married to a person of "non-Aryan descent" were to be retired. The "non-Aryan descent" was defined according to the First Ordinance on the Implementation of the Restoration of Professional Civil Service (RGBl 1933 I, p. 195): It was sufficient if "one parent or one grandparent" was considered "not Aryan". After protest by the "Pfarrernotbund", Reich Bishop Ludwig Müller suspended this church law on 16 November 1933, and passed a law on 8 December 1933 on the "legal relationships of clergy and civil servants of the regional churches", which no longer contained an "Aryan paragraph".

== Inconsistent definition ==
In August 1936, Reich Minister of the Interior Wilhelm Frick defined in a letter to the higher instances: "A "jüdisch versippt" person is one who is married to a Jewish woman (a Jew) in the sense of § 5 of the First Decree to the Reich Citizenship Law is considered to be Jewish in disguise". In the German Civil Servants' Law of 26 August 1936, Wilhelm Frick wrote one higher on instances of the Reich to the effect that "a person who is married to a Jewish woman (a Jew) in the sense of § 5 of the First Decree to the Reich Citizenship Law is considered to be Jewish. In addition, on 26 January 1937, applicants married to a "half-Jew" were excluded as a matter of principle: "Only persons who are of German or related blood and, if they are married, have a spouse of German or related blood can become civil servants. If the spouse is a second degree hybrid, an exception may be granted".

Radical anti-Semitic forces within the NSDAP attempted to abolish all preferential treatment of "first-degree Jewish hybrids" They repeatedly succeeded in including in discriminatory measures also those "Jews who were married to a so-called "half-Jew". In a questionnaire distributed by the Prussian Academy of Sciences in Berlin in 1938, for example, it was stated: "As ''jüdisch versippt'' is the one man whose wife is Jewish or a Jewish half-breed." A memorandum from the party chancellery in the spring of 1944 contained the suggestion that "jüdisch Versippte" who were married to "first-degree half-breeds" would not be allowed to work as self-employed businessmen, craftsmen or factory owners after the end of the war.

== Job restriction ==
Since autumn 1935, Joseph Goebbels had been striving for a consistent "de-Jewification" of the Reich Chamber of Culture. On 6 March 1936, guidelines had been issued on the exclusion or non-admission of Jews, which also concerned "Full Jews and three-quarter Jews of the jüdisch Versippte". Already at the end of 1936, Goebbels tightened this directive, in strict confidence by now also including "all persons married to half and quarter Jews". The "cleansing" lasted longer than expected. In 1937, there were still 156 Jewish members in the Reichskunstkammer, mostly art dealers and art journalists. In 1938, Goebbels complained about difficulties with the Reichsmusikkammer. In February 1939, at least 21 "not fully-Aryan" and "jüdisch versippte" actors and film actors were still busy with his toleration. On 4 May 1943, Goebbels noted in his diary that the Reich Chamber of Culture was "not as de-Jewified as I had actually intended"; however, he did not want to tackle this "problem" any more during the war.

At the end of 1938, the "Reichsärzteführer" determined until further notice that no German who was married to a Jewish woman or a "Jewish half-breed" could be appointed as a doctor.

== Wehrmacht ==
"Jüdisch Versippte" could not attain a higher rank in the Wehrmacht than that of a Feldwebel. On 8 April 1940, "jüdisch Versippte" who were married to "first-degree half-breeds" or even "full Jews" were generally excluded from the Wehrmacht, unless they had distinguished themselves particularly. This decree was slowly implemented at first. Finally, according to the decree of 25 September 1942, even the "tried and tested and distinguished" who had been spared so far were to be dismissed.

In 1944, proposals for the award of orders and decorations had to include the assurance that the person to be awarded was "purely Aryan, and not married to a Jew or a first-degree hybrid".

== Forced labour ==
In October 1943, Fritz Sauckel commissioned the "Gauarbeitsämter" to organize the forced deployment of the "non-defensive half-Jews" and the "Aryans married to fully Jewish women". These forced laborers were initially to be deployed separately, in camps of the Organization Todt in France. Many companies important to the war complained about their employees, and undermined this order. In October 1944, Heinrich Himmler then ordered all men of the groups defined as such, who were fit for service, to be transferred within three days to construction battalions of the Organisation Todt.

In principle, these forced laborers were deployed in separate columns outside their home towns. The kidnapping took place under the camouflage name Sonderkommando J, and is regarded by the historian Ursula Büttner as the victory of the "race experts" of the NSDAP: ""Jüdisch Versippte", who, in spite of all pressure, held to their Jewish spouses unswervingly, were now assigned to the Jews."

== See also ==
- Rosenstrasse protest
- Geltungsjude
- Mischling Test
- Jewish adjacent
