= The Wedding Feast of Samson =

1638 painting by Rembrandt van Rijn

The Wedding of Samson
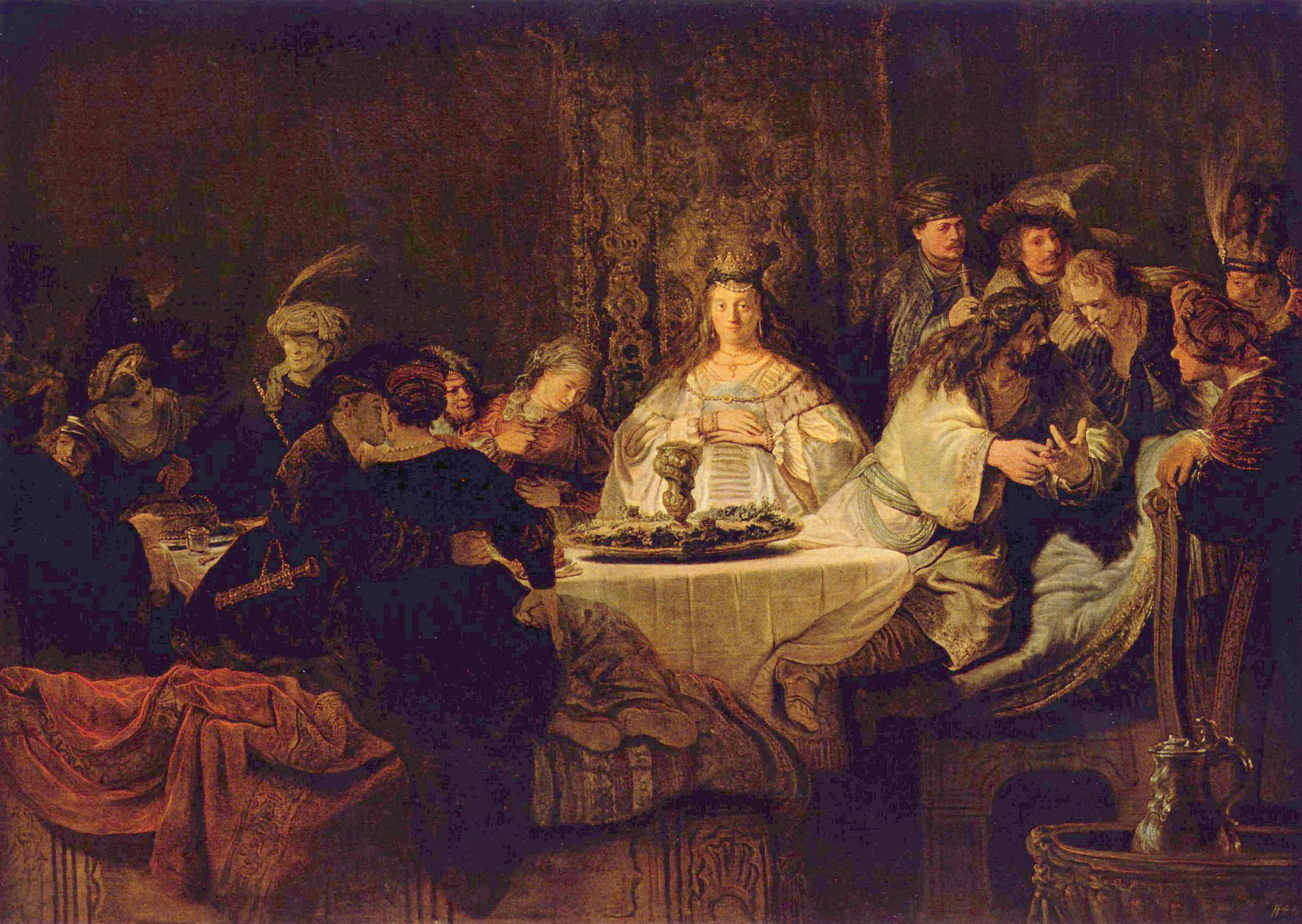
- Artist: Rembrandt
- Year: 1638
- Medium: oil paint, canvas
- Dimensions: 126 cm (50 in) × 175 cm (69 in)
- Location: Gemäldegalerie Alte Meister
- Accession: Gal.-Nr. 1560

The Wedding Feast of Samson is a 1638 oil-on-canvas painting by Rembrandt. It was acquired for his collection in Dresden by Augustus II of Poland (who was also elector of Saxony as Frederick Augustus I). It first appeared in that collection's inventory in 1722–1728 and is now in the Gemäldegalerie Alte Meister.

== See also ==
- List of paintings by Rembrandt

== Sources ==
- The painting at the SKD Online Collection
- Page at the Netherlands Institute for Art History
