= David Brickner =

Former head of the Messianic Jewish missionary group Jews for Jesus

- Born: September 29, 1958 (age 68); Beverly, Massachusetts
- Education: Moody Bible Institute Northeastern Illinois University Fuller School of World Mission
- Known for: head of the Messianic Jewish missionary group Jews for Jesus

David Brickner (born September 29, 1958) is an American ordained Baptist minister who was head of the Messianic Jewish missionary group Jews for Jesus from 1996 to 2024.

== Background and family ==
Brickner was born in Beverly, Massachusetts. Brickner describes himself as a fifth-generation Jewish believer in Jesus. His mother was raised as a Jewish Christian, the descendant of a Hasidic rabbi in Russia, and his father was raised as a traditional Jew. He has two children, Isaac and Ilana.

== Education ==
- 1981 Graduated Moody Bible Institute, Chicago, IL. Diploma in Jewish and Modern Israel Studies
- 1986 Northeastern Illinois University in conjunction with Spertus Institute for Jewish Learning and Leadership. B.A. in Judaica, Minor in Music
- 1994 Fuller School of World Mission, Pasadena, CA. M.A. in Missiology, Concentration in Jewish Evangelism/Judaic Studies

== Career ==
Brickner began his career as a missionary with the Chicago branch of Jews for Jesus. He led the New York City branch until May 1996, then was elected by a council of his peers as the organization's second executive director. Brickner has been in ministry for over thirty years and has appeared many times on secular television and radio programs. He stepped down as executive director in 2024.

== Controversial statements ==
On August 12, 2002, representatives of the U.S. Conference of Catholic Bishops and the National Council of Synagogues signed a joint statement that Catholics should no longer try to evangelize Jews because they "already dwell in a saving covenant with God." Evangelical groups, including Jews for Jesus, strongly objected to the statement. A Los Angeles Times article reported that "the controversy has touched a nerve that underlies religious relations." The article went on to say, "And the ever-controversial Jews for Jesus movement, which believes that Jesus is the Messiah that Jews have been waiting for, also stepped in. David Brickner, the group's executive director, said the bishops had 'crossed the line' and betrayed their responsibility to spread the Gospel. 'Jews need to hear the Gospel. Period. Excluding my Jewish people from Christian witness is theologically and biblically untenable, yet this is exactly what American Catholic bishops' did, Brickner said."

Brickner was reported to have said on 17 August 2008 that the deaths in the Jerusalem bulldozer attack were God's "judgment" for Jews having failed to convert to Christianity. The comments created further controversy because they were made at the Wasilla Bible Church, where Sarah Palin is a member; Palin was chosen a week later to be the Republican candidate for vice-president in the 2008 United States presidential election. Political analysts speculated that Brickner's remarks would cause the Republicans to lose Jewish voters. In an interview with NBC news David Brickner responded to this assessment of his guest speech by saying "That's not what I was saying ... That's not what I believe. The violence is evidence that sin has marred our human condition and because of sin and non belief, God's judgment rests on all humanity."

== Books ==
- Mishpochah Matters: The Jewish Way to Say Family : Speaking Frankly to God's Family, 1996
- Future Hope, 1999
- Christ in the Feast of Tabernacles, 2006
- Christ in the Feast of Pentecost, 2008

== Musical albums produced ==
- Times and Seasons 1986
- Music for Messiah Live 1989
- Messianic Music Festival 1991
- Yeladim for Y'shua 1991
- He Will Return 1991
- Psalms of a Modern David 1991
- David's Hope 1997
