= Moishe Rosen =

American minister and founder of Jews for Jesus (1932–2010)

- Born: April 12, 1932; Kansas City, Missouri, U.S.
- Died: May 19, 2010 (aged 78); San Francisco, California, U.S.
- Education: Northeastern Bible College (1950s)
- Occupation: Baptist minister · Evangelist · Founder
- Years active: 1957–2010
- Organizations: Jews for Jesus; American Board of Missions to the Jews
- Known for: Founder and long-time leader of Jews for Jesus; pioneer of Jewish evangelism within American evangelicalism
- Notable work: Wrote Jews for Jesus (1974); Share the New Life with a Jew (1976); Christ in the Passover (1977, rev. 2006)
- Spouse: Ceil Starr (m. 1950–2010)
- Children: Two

Martin "Moishe" Rosen (April 12, 1932 – May 19, 2010) was an American minister and the founder and former executive director of Jews for Jesus, a Christian missionary organization that focuses on evangelism to Jews.

== Biography ==
Rosen was born in Kansas City, Missouri, the son of Ben Rosen and Rose Baker. He was raised in Denver, Colorado. According to Rosen, his mother's parents were Reform Jews from Austria and his paternal grandfather was an Orthodox Jew. Although his father regularly attended an Orthodox synagogue, Rosen describes him as irreligious and viewing religion as a "racket".

Rosen married Ceil Starr on August 18, 1950, and they became Christians in 1953. After graduating from Northeastern Bible College, Rosen made a commitment to be a missionary to Jews. He was ordained as a Conservative Baptist (now Venture Church Network) minister in 1957. He led Hebrew Christian congregations and worked for 17 years for the American Board of Missions to the Jews (ABMJ), (now called Chosen People Ministries), with the aim of attracting converts. Beginning in 1970, he founded Hineni Ministries under the umbrella of ABMJ, later to become Jews for Jesus. In 1973, he left the employment of ABMJ to incorporate Jews for Jesus as a separate mission. In 1986, he received an honorary Doctor of Divinity Degree from Western Conservative Baptist Seminary in Portland, Oregon.

He stepped down from his position as Jews for Jesus' executive director in 1996, and continued to be employed as a staff missionary, remaining one of fifteen board members until his death in May 2010. In 1997, the Conservative Baptist Association named him a "Hero of the Faith".

A March 2010 article on Charisma magazine's website indicated that Rosen had been suffering from a number of serious health issues, including bone cancer. He died on May 19, 2010, of prostate cancer in San Francisco, California.

== Philosophy ==
In a 1972 New York Times interview, Rosen explained his religious philosophy: "Don't call us converted Jews.... We are not something other than Jewish. I was born a Jew and I will die a Jew—but I am a Jew who believes in Jesus!"

== Publications ==
Rosen wrote numerous books, including:

- Sayings of Chairman Moishe (1972)
- Jews for Jesus (1974)
- Share the New Life with a Jew (1976)
- Christ in the Passover (1977)
- Y'shua: the Jewish way to say Jesus (1982)
- Overture to Armageddon (1991)
- The Universe is Broken: Who on Earth Can Fix It? (1991)
- Demystifying Personal Evangelism (1992)
- Witnessing to Jews (1998)
- Christ in the Passover (2006) [revised and expanded]

== External links and further reading ==
- Ruth Rosen, Called to Controversy: The Unlikely Story of Moishe Rosen and the Founding of Jews for Jesus, Thomas Nelson (2012), hardcover, 320 pages, ISBN 978-1595554918
  - "The Very First Jew for Jesus: Moishe Rosen's Controversial Story, Told by his Daughter" book review by Raphael Magarik in The Jewish Daily Forward, April 10, 2012, issue of April 13, 2012.
- Jim Congdon, Editor, Jews and the Gospel at the End of History: A Tribute to Moishe Rosen, Kregel Academic and Professional Books (2009) ISBN 9780825429347
- Ruth Tucker, Not Ashamed: The Story of Jews for Jesus, Multnomah Press (2000) ISBN 978-1576737002
- Juliene G. Lipson, Jews for Jesus: An Anthropological Study, AMS Press (1990) ISBN 0-4046-2605-X
- Moishe Rosen and William Proctor. Jews for Jesus. Fleming H. Revell (1974), 126 pages, ISBN 978-0800706388
