= Jews for Judaism =

International organization

Jews for Judaism International Inc
- Founded: August 2, 1985; 41 years ago
- Founder: Rabbi Bentzion Kravitz
- Tax ID no.: 95-4040781
- Legal status: 501(c)(3) non-profit organization
- Headquarters: Los Angeles, California, United States
- Location: Canada, United States
- Services: Counseling for hundreds of primary clients and family members; preventative education programs to thousands of students and adults; publication and distribution.
- President, Chairman: David Rifkind
- Director, United States: Rabbi Bentzion Kravitz
- Executive Director, Canada: Julius Ciss
- Revenue: $1,255,989 (2014)
- Expenses: $841,892 (2014)
- Employees: 0 (2014)
- Volunteers: 10 (2014)
- Website: www.jewsforjudaism.org

Jews for Judaism is an international organization that focuses on preventing Jews from converting to other faiths and reclaiming those who have already converted. It provides counseling services, education, and outreach programs to all Jewish denominations. It was established in 1985 by Rabbi Bentzion Kravitz.

The name Jews for Judaism was developed from "Jews for Jesus", one of the principal missionary organizations it was founded to counteract. One of its prominent early members, Larry Levey, was a Jewish convert to Christianity who then converted back to Judaism and led the Baltimore office of Jews for Judaism for a number of years. In addition to its activities in response to Christian missionaries, Jews for Judaism has also been noted for its critiques of the Kabbalah Centre.

== Offices ==
Jews for Judaism has two North American offices, located in Los Angeles, California, United States, and Toronto, Ontario, Canada.

=== Directors ===
- Los Angeles, California, United States: Rabbi Bentzion Kravitz.
- Toronto, Ontario, Canada: Julius Ciss, a former Messianic Jew.

== "Be-True" ==
Jews for Judaism formed the student organization, "Be-True", as a response to missionary activity on university campuses. The organization runs primarily through student representative volunteers. There are currently "Be-True" representatives in the United States, Canada, and Australia.

== See also ==
- Jewish fundamentalism
- Orthodox Judaism outreach
- Penina Taylor
- Tovia Singer
- Yad L'Achim
