= Systems psychology =

Branch of both theoretical and applied psychology

Systems psychology is a branch of both theoretical psychology and applied psychology that studies human behaviour and experience as complex systems. It is inspired by systems theory and systems thinking, and based on the theoretical work of Roger Barker, Gregory Bateson, Humberto Maturana and others. Groups and individuals are considered as systems in homeostasis. Alternative terms here are "systemic psychology", "systems behavior", and "systems-based psychology".

== Types ==
In the scientific literature, different kinds of systems psychology have been mentioned:

Applied systems psychology
In the 1970s the term applied systems psychology was being used as a specialism directly related to engineering psychology and human factor.

Cognitive systems theory
Cognitive systems psychology is a part of cognitive psychology and like existential psychology, attempts to dissolve the barrier between conscious and the unconscious mind.

Concrete systems psychology
Concrete systems psychology is the study of human systems across the varied biological contexts and situations of everyday life.

Contract-systems psychology
Contract-systems psychology is about the human systems actualization through participative organizations.

Family systems psychology
Family systems psychology is a more general name for the subfield of family therapists. Family therapists such as Murray Bowen, Michael E. Kerr, and Baard and researchers have begun to theorize a psychology of the family as a system.

Organismic-systems psychology
Through the application of organismic-systems biology to human behavior Ludwig von Bertalanffy conceived and developed the organismic-systems psychology, as the theoretical prospect needed for the gradual comprehension of the various ways human personalities may evolve and how they could evolve properly, being supported by a holistic interpretation of human behavior.

== Related fields ==
=== Ergonomics ===
Ergonomics, also called "human factors", is the application of scientific information concerning objects, systems and environment for human use (definition adopted by the International Ergonomics Association in 2007). Ergonomics is commonly described as the way companies design tasks and work areas to maximize the efficiency and quality of their employees' work. However, ergonomics comes into everything which involves people. Work systems, sports and leisure, health and safety should all embody ergonomics principles if well designed.

Equipment design is intended to maximize productivity by reducing operator fatigue and discomfort. The field is also called human engineering and human factors engineering. Ergonomic research is primarily performed by ergonomists who study human capabilities in relationship to their work demands. Information derived from ergonomists contributes to the design and evaluation of tasks, jobs, products, environments and systems in order to make them compatible with the needs, abilities and limitations of people.

=== Family system therapy ===
Family system therapy, also referred to as "family therapy" and "couple and family therapy", is a branch of psychotherapy related to relationship counseling that works with families and couples in intimate relationships to nurture change and development. It tends to view the family as a system, family relationships as an important factor in psychological health. As such, family problems have been seen to arise as an emergent property of systemic interactions, rather than to be blamed on individual members. Marriage and Family Therapists (MFTs) are the most specifically trained in this type of psychotherapy.

=== Organizational psychology ===
Industrial and organizational psychology also known as "work psychology", "occupational psychology" or "personnel psychology" concerns the application of psychological theories, research methods, and intervention strategies to workplace issues. Industrial and organizational psychologists are interested in making organizations more productive while ensuring workers are able to lead physically and psychologically healthy lives. Relevant topics include personnel psychology, motivation and leadership, employee selection, training and development, organization development and guided change, organizational behavior, and job and family issues.

=== Perceptual control theory ===
Perceptual control theory (PCT) is a psychological theory of animal and human behavior originated by William T. Powers. In contrast with other theories of psychology and behavior, which assume that behavior is a function of perception – that perceptual inputs determine or cause behavior – PCT postulates that an organism's behavior is a means of controlling its perceptions. In contrast with engineering control theory, the reference variable for each negative feedback control loop in a control hierarchy is set from within the system (the organism), rather than by an external agent changing the setpoint of the controller. PCT also applies to nonliving autonomic systems.

== See also ==
Related fields

- Behavior settings
- Chaos theory
- Communication theory
- Community psychology
- Complex systems
- Constructivist epistemology
- Critical theory
- Environmental psychology
- Living systems theory
- New Cybernetics
- Neuro cybernetics
- Process-oriented psychology
- Social psychology
- Sociotechnical systems theory
- Somatic psychology

Related scientists

- William Ross Ashby
- Donald deAvila Jackson
- Gregory Bateson
- Ludwig von Bertalanffy
- Denny Borsboom
- John Bowlby
- Urie Bronfenbrenner
- Fritjof Capra
- Fred Emery
- László Garai
- Clare W. Graves
- Pim Haselager
- Thomas Homer-Dixon
- Bradford Keeney
- Kurt Lewin
- Humberto Maturana
- Enid Mumford
- Talcott Parsons
- Gordon Pask
- William T. Powers
- Anatol Rapoport
- Jeffrey Satinover
- Einar Thorsrud
- Eric Trist
- Stuart Umpleby
- Francisco Varela
- Lev Vygotsky
- Ken Wilber
- Michael White

Related concepts

- Awareness
- Child development
- Conatus
- Conceptual system
- Connectionism
- Consciousness
- Cultural system
- Embodied embedded cognition
- Equifinality
- Human ecosystem
- Model of hierarchical complexity
- Postcognitivism
- Self control
- Social network
- Social system
