= 1824 in the United Kingdom =

Events from the year 1824 in the United Kingdom.

== Incumbents ==
- Monarch – George IV
- Prime Minister – Robert Jenkinson, 2nd Earl of Liverpool (Tory)
- Home Secretary – Robert Peel
- Foreign Secretary – George Canning
- Secretary of War – Lord Bathurst

== Events ==
- 8 January – After much controversy, Michael Faraday is finally elected as a member of the Royal Society with only two votes against him.
- 22 January – First Anglo-Ashanti War: Battle of Nsamankow – forces of the Ashanti Empire crush British forces in the Gold Coast (modern-day Ghana), killing the British governor Sir Charles MacCarthy.
- 20 February – Rev. Professor William Buckland becomes the first person to describe a terrestrial dinosaur in a scientific journal.
- 4 March – Sir William Hillary founds the National Institution for the Preservation of Life from Shipwreck, after 1854 known as the Royal National Lifeboat Institution.
- 5 March – First Anglo-Burmese War begins.
- 17 March – Anglo-Dutch Treaty signed in London.
- 2 April – The British government buys John Julius Angerstein's art collection for £60,000 for the purpose of establishing a National Gallery in London which opens to the public in his former townhouse on 10 May.
- 7 April – The Mechanics' Institute, predecessor of the University of Manchester Institute of Science and Technology, is founded.
- May–July – King Kamehameha II of Hawaii and his Queen Consort Kamāmalu make a state visit to London, where they both die of measles before they can meet George IV.
- 10 May – First Burmese War: the British take Rangoon.
- 16 June – Society for the Prevention of Cruelty to Animals established.
- 17 June – The Weights and Measures Act legally abolishes use of many traditional measures in favour of Imperial units.
- 21 June – The Vagrancy Act for the first time makes begging or sleeping in the street criminal offences in England.
- 7 August – First Anglo-Ashanti War ends when forces of the Ashanti Empire flee the field.
- 13 September – With his crew and 29 convicts aboard the Amity, John Oxley arrives at and founds the Moreton Bay Penal Settlement at what becomes Redcliffe City, Queensland in Australia, after leaving Sydney.
- 21 September – The Norfolk and Norwich Festival is inaugurated as a triennial event.
- 10 October – Edinburgh Town Council makes a decision to found a municipal fire brigade under James Braidwood, the first in Britain.
- 15–21 November – Great Fire of Edinburgh, starting in Old Assembly Close, kills 11 residents and 2 firemen, and destroys 24 tenements, leaving 400 families homeless, and other properties, including the spire of Tron Kirk.
- 23 November – Great storm in the English Channel; The Cobb (Lyme Regis) and Chesil Beach are breached.

=== Undated ===
- Work commences on the reconstruction of Windsor Castle, Berkshire, to the design of Jeffry Wyattville.
- Speyside Scotch whisky distilleries established in Scotland: Balmenach, Glenlivet and Macallan.
- The Cumberland hunting song "D'ye ken John Peel", written by John Woodcock Graves, is probably first heard.

=== Ongoing ===
- Anglo-Ashanti war (1823–1831)
- First Burmese War (1823–1826)

== Publications ==
- 24 January – first issue of the radical quarterly founded by Jeremy Bentham, The Westminster Review.
- James Hogg's novel The Private Memoirs and Confessions of a Justified Sinner (anonymously).
- Thomas Moore's satirical novel Memoirs of Captain Rock
- James Justinian Morier's satirical novel The Adventures of Hajji Baba of Ispahan
- Sir Walter Scott's historical novel Redgauntlet (anonymously).

== Births ==
- 8 January – Wilkie Collins, novelist (died 1889)
- 15 January – Anna Mary Howitt, writer, painter and feminist (died 1884)
- 7 February – William Huggins, astronomer (died 1910)
- 10 February – Samuel Plimsoll, politician and social reformer (died 1898)
- 19 March – William Allingham, author (died 1889)
- 20 June – George Edmund Street, architect (died 1881)
- 26 June – William Thomson, afterwards Lord Kelvin, physicist and engineer (died 1907)
- 6 July – Richard Meux Benson, founder of the Society of St. John the Evangelist (died 1915)
- 27 October – Edward Maitland, humanitarian writer and occultist (died 1897)
- 10 December – George MacDonald, Scottish-born author, poet and Christian minister (died 1905)

== Deaths ==
- 1 February – John Lemprière, classical scholar (born c. 1765 in Jersey)
- 30 March – Thomas Maurice, poet and scholar (born 1754)
- 13 April – Jane Taylor, poet and novelist (born 1783)
- 19 April – Lord Byron, poet (born 1788)
- 26 May – Capel Lofft, writer (born 1751)
- 25 July – William Sharp, engraver (born 1749)
- 23 September – John Cartwright, political reformer (born 1740)
- 10 October – Thomas Thorne, fictitious poet
- 17 October – Elizabeth Cobbold, poet (born 1767)
- 30 October – Charles Robert Maturin, Irish writer (born 1773)
- 30 November – Henry Fauntleroy, forger executed for fraud (born 1784)
- 21 December – James Parkinson, surgeon (born 1755)
- Undated – William Howgill, organist and composer (born 1768/9)
