= Sensory branding =

Type of marketing that appeals to all the senses

Sensory branding is a type of marketing that appeals to the senses in order to relate with customers on an emotional level.

== Overview ==
Sensory branding is used to promote products or concepts to the customer by focusing on emotional responses to sensory inputs. The accentuation of sensory inputs in marketing has been used in product campaigns, retail design, magazines, showrooms, trade-fair booths, service centers and corporate headquarters. According to Aradhna Krishna (2015), "in the past, communications with customers were essentially monologues — companies just talked at consumers. Then they evolved into dialogues, with customers providing feedback. Now they’re becoming multidimensional conversations, with products finding their own voices and consumers responding viscerally and subconsciously to them.”

Sensory branding can be influenced by sight, noise, touch, taste and smell, where traditional marketing principally focuses on sight and sound. 99% of all brand communication focuses on sight and sound. However, in many instances, sound and smell are more effective than sight when branding a product or organization. Also, visual images are more distinctive when matched with a second sense.

Sensory marketing is often intersecting with fields like social psychology and neurobiology. Theoretical explanations of the causes of sensory marketing have been connected to concepts like psychological priming, crossmodal correspondence or sensation transference.

== The senses ==
=== Sight ===
Sight has been the most used sense in the advertising world over the past century. Firms or brands utilize visual design to express the "personality' of a product which can appeal to the purchaser. Design can be used to convey if a certain brand is new and innovative such as Apple or old and retro such as the Volkswagen Beetle. Packaging is another important aspect that affects the sense of sight and tactics used to market this sense. Successful packages are those that can convey a combination of emotional and functional attributes such as numerous wine, spirits or beer bottles, which have a connecting story or myth.

Sight can also be used with a series of new and innovative technologies such as virtual reality. With the aid of these gadgets, firms and brands can provide customers with sensory experiences that are more immersive and would not be possible otherwise. Marriott Hotel's new 'Teleporter' is a great example: Where interested customers can use a pair of virtual reality glasses to see sights of potential travel destinations.

=== Sound ===
Since the early twentieth century, sound has been applied in mass and sensory branding to create awareness about a firm and its products. U.S retail chains such as The Gap, Eddie Bauer and Toys "R" Us have heavily invested in music programs customized for them.

A very popular form of sound marketing is through the use of jingles. In the United States jingles were used as a new way to market new products and services as early as the 1920s. In 1938, Hereford-born Austen Croom-Johnson (1909–1964) and his Chicago-born lyricist partner, Alan Bradley Kent (né Karl Dewitt Byington, Jr.; 1912–1991) developed the jingle "Pepsi-Cola Hits the Spot," and in 1939 it debuted on radio and became known as the first network jingle. Jingles have traditionally been characterized by short lyrics and commercial messages. They are memorable because short sound sequences that are repeated tend to be easily remembered. Voices can also be used to create a connection between a brand and a sound. Voices are often perceived as personal, emotional and friendly which is why they are so effective for certain brands, however, a voice has to be used continuously and coherently in order to enhance the brand identity. BMW used David Suchet's voice for over 10 years to give the right feeling to its commercials.

=== Smell ===
There are about 20 scent-marketing companies in the world, collectively worth around $80 million, according to Harald Vogt, co-founder of the Scent Marketing Institute in Scarsdale, New York.

In 1990 Singapore Airlines introduced Stefan Floridian Waters, a patented aroma that was blended into the flight attendants' perfume and into hot towels served before take off. Travelers who took several flights on Singapore Airlines and were asked about the smell reported they instantly recognized it upon entering the aircraft, generating comfortable memories of previous flights.

=== Touch ===
Touch is central to human social life and is the most developed sensory modality at birth. Tactile marketing can be used by brands to express their identity and values, however, this requires an interaction between consumer and brand and that is often hard from a distance. Tactile marketing can be facilitated by different sense expressions such as material and surface, temperature and weight and form and steadiness. Firms need to be very selective of when to utilize this since it is perceived diversely across different cultures.

Tactile elements in printed collateral—for example, spot coating, embossing, and foil stamping—can provide multi-sensory cues. Tactile qualities of print (such as paper grain or the coolness of a foil stamp) act as a tactile cue that anchors brand identity beyond visuals alone. Experimental evidence also suggests that adding a congruent touch element to a marketing folder or brochure can increase positive attitudes toward the piece and its message.

== Sensory branding in hospitality ==
The concept of sensory branding in hospitality is growing in adoption, with consultancies like BrandSensory in the UK leading the way in helping businesses to define their sensory characteristics as part of the brand and aesthetic design process. Sensory design principles can ensure that guest perception and brand adoption is maximised for the brand, with elements such as signature scents, atmospheric lighting or artworks, a curated soundtrack, textural details through the design carefully considered, or touches such as a warm welcome drink or a signature biscuit with their coffee or drink. The layering in of subtle details is creating a series of subtle brand cues and comes together as an experience that the guest comes to expect, building trust as well as deepening the memory structures of the brain to create resonance and positive associations.

== See also ==
- Sensory design
