= Planning permission =

Government permission required for construction or expansion

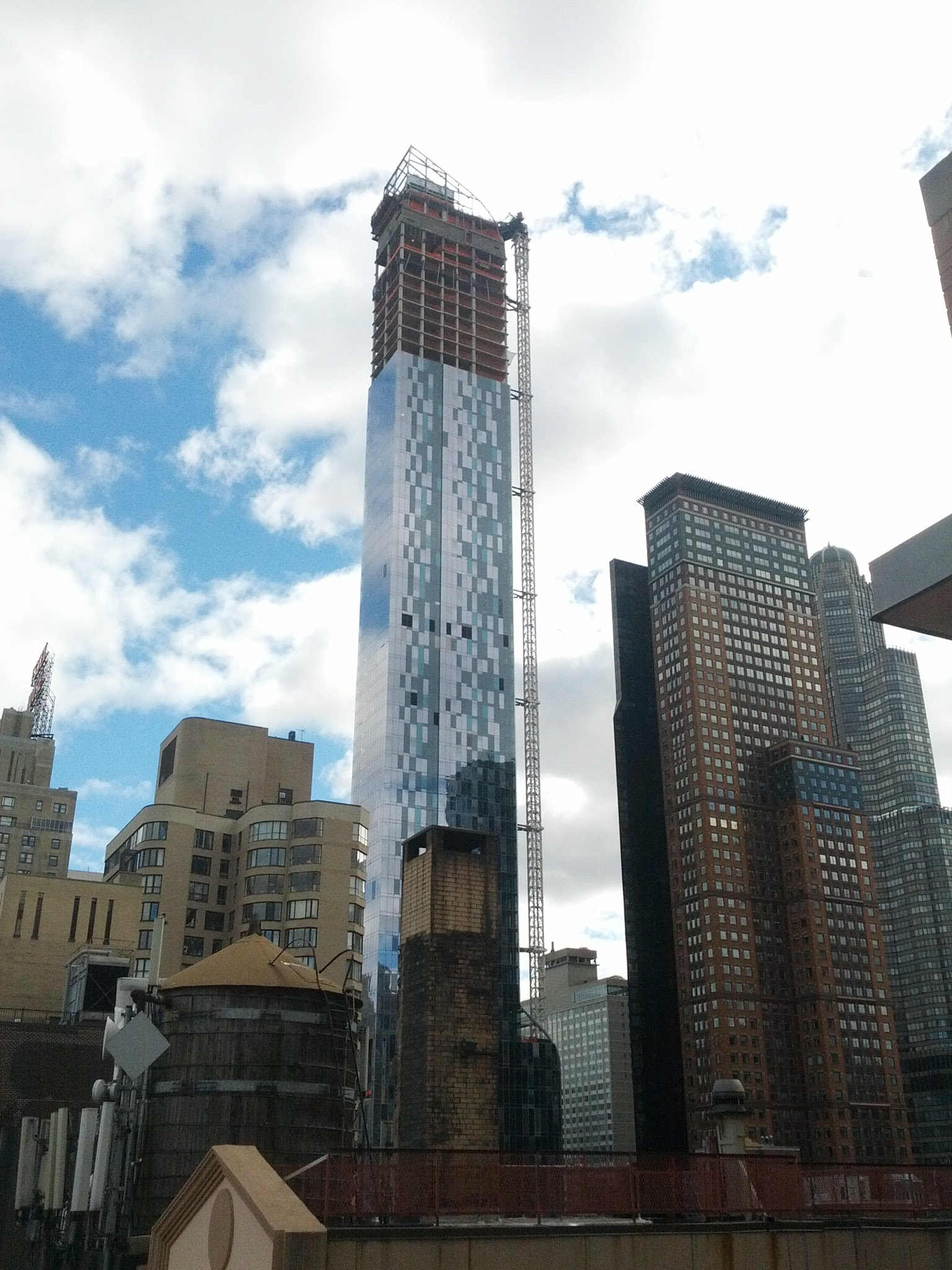
One57, a skyscraper in New York City, under construction. Such a development would have gone through stringent checks against the local building code before planning permission was granted.

Planning permission or building permit refers to the approval needed for construction or expansion (including significant renovation), and sometimes for demolition, in some jurisdictions.

House building permits, for example, are subject to building codes. There is also a "plan check" (PLCK) to check compliance with plans for the area, if any. For example, one cannot obtain permission to build a nightclub in an area where it is inappropriate such as a high-density suburb. The criteria for planning permission are a part of urban planning and construction law, and are usually managed by town planners employed by local governments.

Failure to obtain a permit can result in fines, penalties, and demolition of unauthorized construction if it cannot be made to meet code. Generally, the new construction must be inspected during construction and after completion to ensure compliance with national, regional, and local building codes. Since building permits usually precede outlays for construction, employment, financing and furnishings, they are often used as leading indicator for development in other areas of the economy.

The number of building permits issued per year varies by country. By-right approval processes can be faster than discretionary approval processes.

== In specific industries ==
=== Broadcasting ===
As part of broadcast law, the term is also used in broadcasting, where individual radio and television stations typically must apply for and receive permission to construct radio towers and radio antennas. This type of permit is issued by a national broadcasting authority, but does not imply zoning any other permission that must be given by local government. The permit itself also does not necessarily imply permission to operate the station once constructed. In the U.S., a construction permit is valid for three years. Afterwards, the station must receive a full license to operate, which is good for seven years. This is provided by a separate broadcast license, also called a "license to cover" by the Federal Communications Commission (FCC) in the United States. Further permission or registration for towers may be needed from aviation authorities.

In the U.S., construction permits for new commercial stations are now assigned by auction, rather than the former process of determining who would serve the community of license best. If the given frequency allocation is sought by at least one non-commercial educational (NCE) applicant, or is on an NCE-reserved TV channel or in the FM reserved band, the comparative process still takes place, though the FCC refuses to consider which radio format the applicants propose.

In Canada, the Canadian Radio-television and Telecommunications Commission maintains a comparative process in issuing permits, ensuring that a variety of programming is available in each area, and that as many groups as possible have access to free speech over radio waves.

==== Country-specific requirements ====
Receiving planning permission for broadcasting projects differs between countries and may be split across jurisdictions. As an example, Australia requires planning permission for the right to broadcast to be granted from the Australian Communications and Media Authority which is a federal department of the Australian Government, while permission to build the infrastructure must be approved by the Government of Western Australia, as outlined in State Planning Policy 5.2.

== See also ==
- Corruption in local government
