= Fashion psychology =

Branch of applied human psychology

The transformative power of clothes, the impact of changes in colors and style. A video on social expression through dress.

Fashion psychology, as a branch of applied psychology, applies psychological theories and principles to understand and explain the relationship between fashion and human behavior, including how fashion affects emotions, self-esteem, and identity. It also examines how fashion choices are influenced by factors such as culture, social norms, personal values, and individual differences. Fashion psychologists may use their knowledge and skills to advise individuals, organizations, or the fashion industry on a variety of issues, including consumer behavior, marketing strategies, design, and sustainability.

== Significance ==
- Fashion psychology is an interdisciplinary field that examines the interaction between human behavior, individual psychology, and fashion, as well as the various factors that impact an individual's clothing choice. The fashion industry is actively seeking to establish a connection with fashion psychology, with a focus on areas such as trend prediction and comprehension of consumer behavior.

It is important to acknowledge the significance of clothing choices, irrespective of gender. Fashion choices can have a profound impact on self-perception, the image a person projects to others, and consequently, the way people interact. In fact, they can influence a wide range of scenarios, from the result of a sporting event to how an interviewer perceives capability to perform well in a job role.

Fashion psychology holds significant relevance for marketers as they strive to comprehend the variables that enhance the likelihood of a product's adoption by a consumer group. Additionally, marketers must predict the duration for which the product remains fashionable. Hence, a segment of fashion psychology is dedicated to analyzing the shifts in acceptance of fashion trends over time.

=== Clothing ===
Clothing serves as an extension of identity and provides a tangible reflection of a person's perceptions, dissatisfactions, and desires. The terms "clothing" and "dress" typically denote a type of body covering that can be worn, which is commonly made of textile material but may also utilize other materials or substances to be fashioned and secured in place. Clothing primarily served the purpose of providing warmth and protection against the elements. In modern times, clothing serves multiple functions beyond just protection, including identification, modesty, status, and adornment. Clothing is used to identify group membership, cover the body appropriately, indicate rank or position within a group, and facilitate self-expression and creativity. The clothing a person chooses to wear is significant in terms of their image and reputation, as it sends out messages to both familiar and unfamiliar people, showcasing the person's image. When an object is worn on the body, it takes on the social significance in relation to the person wearing it.

=== Fashion ===
The prevalent understanding of fashion refers to the prevailing style that is adopted by a significant portion of a particular group, at a given time and location. For example, during the era of cave dwellers, animal skins were considered fashionable, while the sari is a popular style among Indian women, and the miniskirt has become a trend among women in Western cultures. Fashion psychology is typically characterized as the examination of how the selections of attire effects perceptions and peoples' evaluations of one another.

== Psychology of clothing ==
Throughout history, clothing has not held the same degree of importance in conveying personality as it does in present times. Technological advancements over the centuries have resulted in fashion choices becoming a significant aspect of identity. During early civilizations, clothing served the primary purpose of keeping us warm and dry. Today, with the advent of technological facilities such as central heating, we have become less reliant on clothing as a means of survival. Clothes have evolved from being merely a practical necessity to becoming a social marker, influencing self-perception and allowing people to present themselves in the desired light while also showcasing their personalities and social status.

In numerous societies, one's dress sense is considered a reflection of personal wealth and taste, as highlighted by Economist George Taylor through the Hemline index.

The fashion impulse is a highly influential and potent social phenomenon owing to its pervasiveness, its capacity to influence an individual's conduct, and its close association with the societal and economic fabric of a nation.

The phrase "You Are What You Wear" implies that people can be judged based on their clothing choices. It suggests that clothing is not just a means of covering the body, but a reflection of a person's identity, values, and social status. The garments we choose to wear serve as a representation of our current thoughts and emotions. Frequently, instances of clothing mishaps can be attributed to underlying internal conflicts manifesting themselves outwardly. Choosing clothing that provides comfort, joy, and a positive self-image can genuinely enhance one's quality of life. Even the slightest modification in one's wardrobe can trigger a sequence of events that leads to new experiences, self-discovery, and cherished moments.

=== Socio-psychological Impact ===
The clothing a person chooses can reflect mental and emotional state, making clothing mishaps a visible manifestation of internal struggles. According to Mary Lynn Damhorst, a researcher in this field, clothing is a systematic method of conveying information about the person who wears it. This suggests that an individual's selection of attire can significantly impact the impression they convey and, consequently, serves as a potent means of communication. From a psychological standpoint, fashion can serve complex and even contradictory purposes. For example, d'Aura (2024) proposed that fashion can serve to communicate values or ideas of the wearer, as well as a shield of identity; something that hides, rather than shows, the wearer's beliefs and social standing. Furthermore, the same research suggested that one of the functions of fashion is to actualise a 'fantasy' whereby the wearer seems to state something at a conscious level which, upon deeper investigation, is contradicted. Often, Fashion choices are explained with an 'explicit' meaning, which is often contradicted by different 'implicit' messages; for example, fashion wearers may declare that their fashion choices are motivated by sustainability, but a deeper inspection reveals that such choices are not consistent with the declared value. In this case, the value of sustainability lives in fantasy even when not fully practised in reality.

==== Upbringing and fashion choice ====
Madonna is known for her ever-changing style, often shortened as "reinvention"

Madonna describes her upbringing in a strict Catholic family, where wearing pants to church was strongly discouraged by her father. Reflecting on this experience, she acknowledges the powerful influence that clothing can have and how it inspired her to incorporate a mix of conservative and daring elements in her personal style. She refers to this combination as "combinations of strictness and rebelliousness." Madonna's fashion choices, including her crucifix earrings and rosary bead necklaces, were influenced by this realization.

==== Body image ====
Clothing can be perceived as an extension of an individual's physical self and serves the purpose of modifying the body's appearance. The way in which a person perceives their own physical appearance has a significant impact on their attitudes and preferences towards clothing.

Millennial females, also known as Generation Y, are being socialized to begin their fashion consumption at an earlier age than their predecessors, resulting in a shift in the typical starting point of fashion consumption. Even though Generation Y consumers play a crucial role in the decision-making process of the market, retailers are finding it increasingly difficult to comprehend the behavior and psychology of these consumers.

==== Brand ====
Consumers purchase fashion-branded products not only to meet their functional requirements but also to fulfill their desires for social recognition, self-image projection, and a desirable lifestyle. The implementation of effective branding strategies is a crucial determinant of success for all types of fashion brands, as it has a direct impact on the welfare of consumers.

==== Marketing strategies ====
The fashion industry is currently shifting towards a data-driven approach, where brands are leveraging analytical services to formulate innovative marketing strategies. The impact of artificial intelligence on marketing strategies is expected to extend to various areas, such as business models, sales processes, customer service options, and even consumer behaviours.

==== Impact of clothing color ====
Psychologists hold the belief that the color of apparel can have an impact on emotional states and stress levels. The presence of color has the potential to augment an individual's perception of their environment.

==== Design ====
Fashion psychology concerns itself with examining the ways in which fashion design can influence a positive body image, utilizing psychological insights to foster a sustainable approach towards clothing production and disposal, and understanding the underlying reasons behind the development of specific shopping behaviors.

== Men's fashion insecurities ==
Research has shown that the conventional gender stereotype suggesting that females are more fashion-conscious and observant of others' clothing and makeup choices than males is not completely accurate. Instead, these studies have highlighted that men also encounter insecurities linked to their clothing decisions. In fact, research has shown that men often exhibit higher levels of self-consciousness than women when it comes to their personal sense of style and the public perception of their appearance.

=== Dress to impress ===
In research conducted by Joseph Benz from the University of Nebraska, over 90 men and women were surveyed to investigate their behavior of deceiving potential partners during dates. The study revealed that both sexes engage in deceptive behaviors while dating, albeit for distinct reasons.

The study findings suggest that men engage in deceptive behavior to create a positive impression on their romantic partners. This can include highlighting their financial resources or showing willingness to provide security and stability in the relationship. Similarly, women tend to exhibit deceptive conduct concerning their physical appearance, amplifying specific bodily attributes to enhance their appeal to their romantic partner.

== Shopping behavior ==
=== Compulsive buying disorder ===
CBD or Compulsive buying disorder is a condition in which an individual experiences distress or impairment due to their excessive shopping thoughts and buying behavior.

According to Bleuler, Kraepelin identifies a final category of individuals known as "buying maniacs" or "oniomaniacs." These individuals experience compulsive buying behavior, leading to the accumulation of debt that is often left unpaid and can ultimately result in a catastrophic situation. The oniomaniacs never fully acknowledge their debts and therefore continue to struggle with them.

In contemporary consumer-oriented societies, the act of purchasing branded fashion apparel has become a significant aspect of our daily routines and economy. It is often regarded as a source of entertainment and a means of rewarding oneself. However, when this behavior is overindulged, it may lead to a serious psychological condition known as compulsive buying behavior.

=== Revenge buying and panic buying ===
In April 2020, when the lockdown restrictions were largely lifted and markets resumed operation in China, a phenomenon known as "revenge buying" took place. During this time, the renowned French luxury brand Hermès achieved exceptional sales of $2.7 million in a single day. Sociologists posit that compulsive and impulsive purchasing tendencies, including panic buying and revenge buying, function as coping mechanisms that alleviate negative emotions. The phenomena of panic buying, and revenge buying are essentially attempts by consumers to compensate for a situation that is beyond their personal control. These actions serve as a therapeutic means of exerting control over external circumstances, while also offering a sense of comfort, security, and an overall improvement in well-being.

=== Fast fashion ===
The emergence of fast fashion has had a significant impact on the fashion industry, altering the ways in which fashion is conceptualized, manufactured, and consumed, resulting in negative consequences across all three domains. The popularity of fast fashion among consumers can be attributed to its capability of appealing to their emotional, financial, and psychological needs by tapping into their desire for self-expression, social status, and immediate satisfaction.

== See also ==
- Attitude (psychology)
- Cognitive dissonance
- Feeling
- Neuromarketing
- Retail marketing
- Semiotics of dress
- Semiotics of fashion
- Sensory branding
