= D'ye ken John Peel (song) =

Folk hunting song from Cumberland, England

"D'ye ken John Peel?"

Song
- Written: c. 1824
- Published: 1866
- Genre: English folk, pop, world, English country (unofficial anthem of the Cumberland region)
- Lyricist: John Woodcock Graves

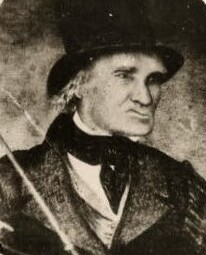
John Peel

"D'ye ken John Peel?" – which translates to "Do you know John Peel?" – is a famous Cumberland hunting song written around 1824 by John Woodcock Graves (1795–1886) in celebration of his friend John Peel (1776–1854), an English fox hunter from the Lake District. The melody is said to be a contrafactum of a popular border rant, "Bonnie Annie." A different version, the one that endures today, was musically adapted in 1869 by William Metcalfe (1829–1909), the organist and choirmaster of Carlisle Cathedral. The tune etymology has a long history that has been traced back to 1695 and attributed to adaptations – one in particular, from the 20th century, the 1939 jingle, "Pepsi-Cola Hits the Spot."

== History ==
John Graves, who wrote it in the Cumbrian dialect, tinkered with the words over the years and several versions are known. George Coward, a Carlisle bookseller who wrote under the pseudonym Sidney Gilpin, rewrote the lyrics with Graves' approval, translating them from their original broad Cumberland dialect to Anglian; and in 1866, he published them in the book, Songs and Ballads of Cumberland. Another song written by Graves mentions one of John's brothers, Askew Peel (1789–1854), a horsedealer who also lived in Caldbeck.

"D'ye ken John Peel?" was first sung in 1824 in Gate House in Caldbeck in John Graves’ home to the tune of the Border rant "Bonnie Annie." A different musical version was composed in 1869 by William Metcalfe, a conductor, composer, and lay clerk of Carlisle Cathedral. His arrangement – lauded as more musical than the traditional melody – became popular in London and was widely published. In 1906, the song was published in The National Song Book, but with a tune closer to Bonnie Annie – and that version is the most widely known today. English counties have no official anthem. However, "D'ye ken John Peel?" is commonly regarded as a kind of unofficial anthem of Cumberland and the region.

=== Etymology and other uses ===
British musicologist Ann Gilchrist (1863–1954) and Canadian folklorist Edith Fowke (1913–1996) trace the use of the tune and lyrics in other songs and poems, including:

1. "Red House," first published in 1695 by John Playford (1623–1686/7) in The Dancing Master (9th ed.)
  Aka:
  1. "Where will Our Good Man Lay?"
  2. "Where/Whar Wad Our Gudman/Bonny Annie Lye/Laye"
  3. "Where/Whar wad our Guidman Lie"
    "Where Will Our Goodman Laye," published in Oswald's Caledonian Pocket Companion for the Flute (Vol. 2) (c. 1750), published by James Oswald (1710–1769)
  4. From the 1729 opera, Polly, Act I, Scene VIII, Air 9, the song "Red House," being the same version published in The Dancing Master
2. "Address to the Woodlark," by Robert Burns (1759–1796)
3. "0! What Can Make My Annie Sigh?" by John Anderson
4. The words, "Where wad bonny Anne lye?," in the song, "The Cordial," sung to the tune "Where Should Our Goodman Ly?"
  Published 1 January 1724, in Allan Ramsay's Tea-Table Miscellany: Or A Collection of Choice Songs, Scots and English (11th ed.) (Vol. 1 of 4)
5. English-turned-American composer Austen Herbert Croom-Johnson (1909–1964), born in Hereford, imported the tune, "D'ye ken John Peel," and scored it for a 1939 jingle, "Pepsi-Cola Hits the Spot" (aka "Nickel, Nickel"). His Chicago-born lyricist partner, Alan Bradley Kent (né Karl Dewitt Byington, Jr.; 1912–1991), wrote the words.

––––––––––––––––––––
goodman = husband
guidman = form of address, typically between people of equal rank who are not on familiar terms (also gudman, gudeman, goodman, and more)
bonnie = pretty, attractive
air = aria or song
ken = to be aware of or to know

== Lyrics ==
=== Cumbrian Dialect ===
Cumbrian lyrics, taken from Hodgson manuscript.

Did ye ken John Peel in his cwot seay grey?
Did ye ken John Peel at the breck o the day?
Did ye ken John peel ganging far, far away -
Wid his hounds and his horn in a mwornin?

Chorus:

For the sound o the horn caw'd me fra my bed.
An the cry o the hounds me oft times led,
For Peel's view hollo wad waken the dead,
Or a fox fra his lair in a mwornin.

Did ye ken that bitch wheas tongue was death,
Or ken her sons of peerless faith,
Did ye ken that a fox wid his last breath,
Curs'd them ô as he died in a mwornin?

Chorus:

Yes I kennd John Peel an awl Ruby too,
Ranter an Royal an Belman as true,
Fra the drag to the chess fra the chess to the view,
Fra the view to the death in a mwornin.

Chorus:

An av follot John Peel beath oft an far,
Ower menny a yett an toplin bar,
Fra low Dentonholm up to Scratchmer Scar,
When we struggled for the brush in a mwornin.

Chorus:

Here's to John Peel with hert an my soul,
Come fill ô! fill to him another bowl,
An lets follow John Peel tro' fair an foul,
Wheyle were wak't by his horn in a mwornin'.

Chorus:

=== Standard English ===
Verse 1 (best known; by Graves)

D'ye ken John Peel with his coat so gay? ‡
D'ye ken John Peel at the break o' day?
D'ye ken John Peel when he's far, far a-way.
With his hounds and his horn in the morning?

Chorus:

For the sound of his horn brought me from my bed,
And the cry of his hounds which he oft time led,
Peel's "View, Halloo!" could awaken the dead,
Or the fox from his lair in the morning.

‡ Some versions, according to The Oxford Dictionary of Quotations, show the phrase as " ... with his coat so grey," implying that his coat was likely made of local Herdwick wool, commonly grey. If so, the colour of John Peel's coat would be in contrast to that of other huntsmen – traditionally brightly coloured, often red or hunting pink.

=== Additional verses ===
Verse 2 (Coward's version)

D'ye ken that bitch whose tongue was death?
D'ye ken her sons of peerless faith?
D'ye ken that fox, with his last breath
Curs’d them all as he died in the morning?
For the sound of his horn, etc.

Verse 3

Yes I ken John Peel and Ruby too
Ranter and Royal and Bellman as true, *
From the drag to the chase, from the chase to the view
From a view to the death in the morning
For the sound of his horn, etc.

Verse 4

And I've followed John Peel both often and far,
O'er the rasper fence and the gate and the bar,
From low Denton Holme up to Scratchmere Scar,
Where we vie for the brush in the morning
For the sound of his horn, etc.

Verse 5

Then here's to John Peel with my heart and soul
Come fill – fill to him another strong bowl,
And we'll follow John Peel through fair and through foul
While we’re waked by his horn in the morning.
For the sound of his horn, etc.

* These were the real names of the hounds that Peel, in his old age, said were the very best he ever had or saw. – J.W.G.

=== Alternative versions ===
As is common with songs often sung from memory, this has been recorded with other verses and minor differences in lyrics, such as in the third verse: "From the drag to the chase, from the chase to the view" and "From a view to a death in the morning":

Alternative verse 1

Yes, I ken John Peel and his Ruby, too!
Ranter and Ringwood, Bellman so true!
From a find to a check, from a check to a view,
From a view to a kill in the morning.
For the sound of his horn', etc.

Coward's version of the last line was used for Matt Cartmill's book, A View to a Death in the Morning: Hunting and Nature Through History as well as Anthony Powell's novel From a View to a Death. The alternative version was used as a title to the short story From a View to A Kill, found in the Ian Fleming collection of short stories, For Your Eyes Only. This was in turn shortened to A View to a Kill, when applied to the fourteenth James Bond movie.

This verse was not in Coward's version:

Alternative verse 2

D'ye ken John Peel with his coat so gay?
He liv'd at Troutbeck once on a day;
Now he has gone far, away;
We shall ne'er hear his voice in the morning.
For the sound of his horn, etc.

=== Parodies ===
A number of parodies also exist. On BBC radio's I'm Sorry, I'll Read That Again, a version parodied the British Radio DJ John Peel

1st parody

D'ye ken John Peel with his voice so grey?
He sounds as if he's far far away;
He sends you to sleep at the end of the day;
'til you're woken up by Tony Blackburn in the morning.

Another was used in the 1979 film Porridge, which saw Ronnie Barker as Fletch cheekily observe a new prison warden.

2nd parody

D'ye see yon screw with his look so vain?
With his brand new key on his brand new chain;
With a face like a ferret and a pea for a brain
And his hand on his whistle in the morning.

Several lines of the song are also parodied in the course of James Joyce's Finnegans Wake. In the same vein, Birkenhead post-punk group Half Man Half Biscuit included the song 'D'ye ken Ted Moult?' on their compilation ACD, adapting the lyrics to address the 1980s double glazing spokesman of the same name, while comic singer-songwriter John Shuttleworth used the song as the basis for his cassette-only album Do You Ken Ken Worthington?.

== Regimental marches ==
- "John Peel" was one of the quick marches of the King's Own Royal Border Regiment before it merged in 2004 with the Queen's Lancashire Regiment and the King's Regiment to become the Duke of Lancaster's Regiment.
- "John Peel" was the march of the 1st Cumberland Artillery Volunteers.
- "John Peel" is the authorized Regimental March (dismounted) of The Lorne Scots (Peel, Dufferin and Halton Regiment) and The Ontario Regiment (RCAC) of the Canadian Forces.
- "John Peel" is the regimental march of the Queen's Own Yeomanry, an armoured formation reconnaissance regiment of the British Army.

== Wedgwood ==
Wedgwood's creamware pitcher modelled with hunting scenes in low relief and with a handle modelled as a leaping hound, which was introduced in 1912, carried the pattern name "D'ye Ken John Peel".

== Selected audio and discography ==
- Robert Radford (1874–1933), bass vocalist

With orchestra and chorus
Recorded April 1907
"D'ye ken John Peel"
Gramophone Concert Record G.C.-3-2798
Matrix runout (Side A): Ho 2861ab

- University of Pennsylvania Glee Club, Fall 2018

"D'ye ken John Peel?"
(audio via YouTube)

- Peter Dawson (1882–1961), Australian baritone

With chorus and orchestra
Recorded 1918
Side B: "D'ye ken John Peel"
Zonophone Record – The Twin™ 1841
British Zonophone Co., Ltd., England
Matrix runout (Side B label): X-3-42886
(audio via YouTube)
OCLC 317415992

- Tune Twisters

"Pepsi-Cola Hits the Spot" (1939)
(audio via YouTube)

- King's Own Royal Border Regiment

"John Peel," quick march
(audio via YouTube)

- Queen's Own Yeomanry

"D'ye ken John Peel," quick march of the regiment
(audio via YouTube)

- Band of H.M. Coldstream Guards (28 March 2018)

"D'ye ken John Peel"
(audio via YouTube)

- Johnny Fosdick and Orchestra, pseudonym of Harry Sosnik (nl) (né Harry Sosnek; 1906–1996)

Anita Boyer (née Anita Blanche Boyer; 1915–1985), vocalist
Both sides recorded December 1941, New York
Side A: "Swinging the Jingle"

Austen Croom Johnson (music, American version)
Alan Kent (words)
Helmy Kresa (orchestra arrangement)

Side B: "Get Hep"

Bissell Palmer (né Bissell Barbour Palmer; 1889–1968) (words)
Helmy Kresa (orchestra arrangement)

Nocturne Records (fictitious label of Pepsi-Cola)
Matrix runout (Side A): 3135 A-1
Matrix runout (Side B): 3135 B-1
("Swinging the Jingle" via YouTube)
("Get Hep" via YouTube)

P.M.Adamson Download sites and youtube

== Extant old publications ==
- "D'ye ken John Peel," hunting song; words by John Woodcock Graves, music by William Metcalfe, London: J.B. Cramer & Co.; Carlisle: W. Metcalfe (1869); series: The Songs and Ballads of Cumberland (alternate link) (No. 1); OCLC 1061746988; British Library 004523817

== Copyrights ==
Catalog of Copyright Entries, Part 3: Musical Compositions

1. "D'ye ken John Peel?" descriptive piece by Shipley Douglas (1868–1920) (in Hawkes & Son Military Band Edition, No. 394)
  © 27 June 1913; E316233
  Hawkes & Son, London
  (copyright is claimed on arrangement)
  New Series, Vol. 8, Part 3, p. 792
  OCLC 498315413; British Library 004311656
2. "John Peel," variations on an English tune
  Hubert Crook, of Great Britain; pf.
  Cover title: "D'ye ken John Peel"
  © 2 February 1925 (1 copy 13 February 1925); E608716
  A. Hammond & Co., London
  New Series, Vol. 20, No. 1 (1926) p. 76
  OCLC 497756658; British Library 004288220

=== Copyrights relating to Pepsi-Cola ===
Catalog of Copyright Entries, Part 3: Musical Compositions

1939 Pepsi-Cola jingle

1. "D'ye ken John Peel"
  "American adaptation" – words and melody by Austen Croom Johnson
  1 copy; 12 January 1938; EU157880
  ABC Music Corporation, New York
  New Series, Vol. 33, No. 1 (1938), p. 10
  Published by Chappell & Co. (4º)
  OCLC 497288096; British Library 004437471
2. "Do ye ken, John Peel?"
  Additional lyrics by Eddie DeLange; adaptation and arrangement by Austen Croom Johnson
  NM: adaptation and arrangement with additional lyrics
  1 copy; 24 February 1938; EU161663
  Irving Berlin, Inc., New York
  New Series, Vol. 33, No. 3 (1938), p. 233
  29 July 1965; R365626
  Margaret Mary LeLange (né Margaret Mary Lohden; 1918–1990) (widow)
  Third Series, Vol. 19, Part 5, No. 2, Section 1, January – June 1965 (1967), p. 2154
3. "Do ye ken, John Peel?"
  Additional lyrics by Eddie DeLange; adaptation and arrangement by Austen Croom-Johnson
  NM: adaptation and arrangement with additional lyrics
  1 copy; 16 March 1938; EP68157
  Irving Berlin, Inc., New York
  New Series, Vol. 33, No. 5 (1938), p. 485
  29 July 1965; R365625
  Margaret Mary LeLange (widow)
  Third Series, Vol. 19, Part 5, No. 2, Section 1, January – June 1965 (1967), p. 2154
4. "Do ye ken John Peel," fox trot
  Additional lyrics by Eddie DeLange; adaptation and arrangement by Austen Croom Johnson; dance arrangement by Joe Lippman (né Joseph P. Lipman; 1915–2007); Orchestra parts
  © 14 April 1938; EP70500
  Irving Berlin, Inc., New York
  New Series, Vol. 33, No. 9 (1938), p. 991
5. "Pepsi-Cola Hits the Spot"
  ©1939 by Johnson-Siday
  (Austen Croom Johnson & Eric Siday)
  (copyright source not found)
6. "Pepsi-Cola Radio Jingle"
  Words and arrangement by Austen Herbert Croom-Johnson & Alan Bradley Kent
  1 copy; 2 January 1940; EP162049
  (original copyright source not found)
  7 April 1967; R407224
  PepsiCo, Inc. (formerly Pepsi-Cola Co.)
  Third Series, Vol. 21, Part 5, No. 1, Section 1, January – June 1967 (1968), p. 881
7. "Get Hep"
  Bissell Palmer (né Bissell Barbour Palmer; 1889–1968) (words); Helmy Kresa (music)
  9 October 1941; EP98040
  Pepsi-Cola Company of Long Island City, New York
  New Series, Vol. 36, No. 10 (1941), p. 1688

New theme

8. "Pepsi-Cola Hits the Spot"
  Words and adaptation of music of the Pepsi-Cola Co.
  NM: Adaptation and revised words
  ©Pepsi-Cola Co.
  1 March 1965; EU867255

=== Copyrights relating to wind ensembles ===
Catalog of Copyright Entries, Part 3: Musical Compositions

1. "The King's Own Border Regiment," regimental quick march, "John Peel," for military band
  Arranged by C.V. Wright, (Note: C.V. Wright, A.R.A.M. (Associate of the Royal Academy of Music), L.R.C.M., born about 1930, became bandmaster in 1957 of the Royal Border Regiment Band after serving a year at the Royal Military School of Music.) London
  Parts
  (Popular Marches for Military Band and Brass Band)
  NM: Arrangement
  Hawkes & Son, London, Ltd.
  9 December 1960; EF0-76517
  Third Series, Vol. 15, Part 5, No. 1, January – June 1961, p. 274

––––––––––––––––––––
EF = Music published abroad
EP = Class E (musical composition), published
UP = Class E (musical composition), unpublished
R = Copyright renewal
NM = New matter

== In popular culture ==
- D'Ye Ken John Peel? a 1935 film
- Bellman and True, a 1987 film starring Bernard Hill, uses the lyrics to describe the various duties of bankrobbers (i.e., a Bellman, in the vernacular of the London underworld, is a person who "fixes" alarms). A version of the song plays during the closing credits, sung by Lonnie Donegan.
- Death in the Morning has been the title of several books and television episodes, among them:

"Death in the Morning" an episode from James Burke's television series Connections
"Death in the Morning", a story by John Monk Saunders
"Death in the Morning", an episode of television series Tales of the Unexpected
"Death in the Morning", an episode of television series The Mallorca Files
"A View to a Death in the Morning: Hunting and Nature Through History", a book by Matt Cartmill
