= Aradhna Krishna =

American marketing academic (born 1961)

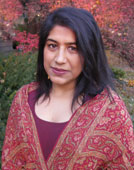
- Krishna in 2013
- Born: 1961; India
- Known for: Sensory marketing
- Scientific career
- Fields: Marketing
- Workplaces: New York University; Columbia University; National University of Singapore; University of Michigan

Aradhna Krishna is an Indian-American academic focused on marketing. Harvard Business Review recently acknowledged her as "the foremost expert in the field" of sensory marketing. She is the Dwight F. Benton Professor of Marketing at the Ross School of Business at the University of Michigan. She was awarded as a fellow of the Society for Consumer Psychology, the organization's highest honor, in recognition of her contributions to consumer psychology.

== Contributions to marketing ==
Krishna organized the first academic conference on sensory marketing' (in 2008), bringing together psychologists, neuroscientists, marketing academics and practitioners. She defines sensory marketing as "marketing that engages the consumers' senses and affects their perception, judgment and behavior (and suggests that) from a managerial perspective, sensory marketing can be used to create subconscious triggers that characterize consumer perceptions of abstract notions of the product (e.g., its sophistication or quality)".

In more than fifty published articles, Krishna has explored ways in which a product's look, feel, taste, sound, and smell contribute to how it is perceived, and how people respond to it. Illustrating her research, she also edited and contributed to the book, Sensory Marketing: Research on the Sensuality of Products, in 2009. She also runs an international sensory marketing research laboratory.

In 2013, she published a book, Customer Sense: How the 5 Senses Influence Buying Behavior.

Some important concepts introduced by Krishna's work are perceived consumption, guiltless gluttony, and Smellizing. Raghubir and Krishna (1999) show that container shapes can impact perceived consumption, which is how much consumers think they have eaten or drunk as opposed to how much they have actually eaten or drunk.

Aydinoglu and Krishna (2011) show that food size labels (e.g., a large size portion of french fries being labeled medium) can result in believing that one has not eaten too much and thus not feeling guilty about it (guiltless gluttony).

Smellizing is a term coined by Krishna (Krishna, Morrin and Sayin 2014) to reflect "imagining smells". Krishna, Morrin and Sayin (2014) show that smellizing foods can result in similar physiological responses (salivation) as real smells, when a picture of the food is also available.

Besides sensory marketing, she works on designing winning cause marketing and corporate social responsibility programs, and on constructing engaging pricing and promotion policies.

The implications of Krishna's research and expertise have been recognized not only within academia, but within business in general, being frequently quoted in outlets such as Time magazine, The New York Times, and The Daily Telegraph.

== Other endeavors ==
Krishna is a lead area editor for the Journal of Consumer Psychology, an area editor for Management Science and serves on the editorial boards of Journal of Marketing Research, Journal of Consumer Research, and Marketing Science.

== Recognition ==
- Fellow of the Society for Consumer Psychology
- Ross School of Business Senior Faculty Research Award 2007
- Best paper award at Winter American Marketing Association conference 2006
- Outstanding reviewer award - Journal of Consumer Research (2002-2003).
- William R. Davidson Award for best paper to appear in the Journal of Retailing in 2002
- American Marketing Association Doctoral Dissertation competition winner, 1990.

== Selected articles ==
- Aydinoğlu, Nilüfer Z. & Krishna, Aradhna (April 1, 2011). "Guiltless Gluttony: The Asymmetric Effect of Size Labels on Size Perceptions and Consumption" (PDF). Journal of Consumer Research. 37 (6): 1095–1112. doi:10.1086/657557.
- Krishna, Aradhna, Ryan S. Elder & Cindy Caldara (October 2010), "Feminine to smell but masculine to touch? Multisensory congruence and its effect on the aesthetic experience", Journal of Consumer Psychology, 20 (4): 410-418.
- Krishna, Aradhna, May Lwin & Maureen Morrin (June 2010), "Product Scent and Memory", Journal of Consumer Research. 37: 57-67.
- Lwin, May, Maureen Morrin, & Aradhna Krishna (2010), "Exploring the Superadditive Effects of Scent and Pictures on Verbal Recall: An Extension of Dual Coding Theory", Journal of Consumer Psychology, 20 (3): 317-326.
- Krishna, Aradhna & Maureen Morrin (April 2008), "Does Touch Affect Taste? The Perceptual Transfer of Product Container Haptic Cues", Journal of Consumer Research, 34: 807-818.
- Krishna, Aradhna (April 2005), "How Big is Tall?", Forethought, Harvard Business Review, 83 (4): 18-19.
