= R. E. Siday =

British mathematician and physicist

Raymond Eldred Siday (1912–1956) was an English mathematician specialising in quantum mechanics. He obtained his BSc in Special Physics and later worked at the University of Edinburgh. He began collaborating with Werner Ehrenberg in 1933.

Raymond Siday is known for the Ehrenberg–Siday effect.

== Family ==
Born in Ealing, West London, he was the son of accountant George Siday and the younger brother of Eric Siday, a pioneer of the advertising jingle, electronic music and an amateur racing driver. Their family address was 30, Kent Gardens, W5.

== Ehrenberg–Siday–Aharonov–Bohm effect ==
The Ehrenberg–Siday effect, later known as the Aharonov–Bohm effect, is a quantum mechanical phenomenon by which a charged particle is affected by electromagnetic fields in regions from which the particle is excluded. The earliest form of this effect was predicted by Ehrenberg and Siday in 1949, and similar effects were later rediscovered by Aharonov and Bohm in 1959.

Such effects are predicted to arise from both magnetic fields and electric fields, but the magnetic version has been easier to observe. In general, the consequence of Aharonov–Bohm effects is that knowledge of the classical electromagnetic field acting locally on a particle is not sufficient to predict its quantum-mechanical behavior.

== Selected papers ==
- Siday, R.E. (1942). "The determination of the optical properties of thick magnetic lenses, and the application of these lenses to beta-ray spectrometry". Proc. Phys. Soc. 54 (3): 266–277. Bibcode:1942PPS....54..266S. doi:10.1088/0959-5309/54/3/305.
- Siday, R.E. (1947). "The optical properties of axially symmetric magnetic prisms part 1: The study of rays in a plane of symmetry, and its application to the design of prism β-spectroscopes". Proc. Phys. Soc. 59 (6): 905–917. Bibcode:1947PPS....59..905S. doi:10.1088/0959-5309/59/6/301.
- Siday, R.E. (1947). "The Optical Properties of Axially Symmetric Magnetic Prisms". Proc. Phys. Soc. 59 (6): 1036–1036. Bibcode:1947PPS....59Q1036.. doi:10.1088/0959-5309/59/6/415.
- Ehrenberg, W.; Siday, R. E. (1949). "The Refractive Index in Electron Optics and the Principles of Dynamics". Proc. Phys. Soc. B62 (1): 8–21. Bibcode:1949PPSB...62....8E. doi:10.1088/0370-1301/62/1/303.
