= Corruption in local government =

Corruption in local government refers to the misuse of public office and resources by individuals in positions of power at the local level for personal gain or the benefit of select groups. It involves the abuse of entrusted authority, bribery, embezzlement, fraud, nepotism, and other forms of illicit activities that undermine the integrity and effectiveness of local governance.

== Types ==
There are several types of political corruption that occur in local government. Some are more common than others, and some are more prevalent to local governments than to larger segments of government. Local governments may be more susceptible to corruption because interactions between private individuals and officials happen at greater levels of intimacy and with more frequency at more decentralized levels. Forms of corruption pertaining to money like bribery, extortion, embezzlement, and graft are found in local government systems. Other forms of political corruption are nepotism and patronage systems.

- Bribery is the offering of something which is most often money but can also be goods or services in order to gain an unfair advantage. Common advantages can be to sway a person's opinion, action, or decision, reduce amounts of fees collected, speed up government grants, or change outcomes of the legal processes.
- Extortion is threatening or inflicting harm to a person, their reputation, or their property in order to unjustly obtain money, actions, services, or other goods from that person. Blackmail is a form of extortion.
- Embezzlement is the illegal taking or appropriation of money or property that has been entrusted to a person but is actually owned by another. In political terms, this is called graft, which is when a political officeholder unlawfully uses public funds for personal purposes. This can include stealing funds, falsifying records, or misusing funds.
- Nepotism is the practice or inclination to favor a group or person who is a relative when giving promotions, jobs, raises, and other benefits to employees. This is often based on the concept of familism, which is believing that a person must always respect and favor family in all situations, including those pertaining to politics and business. This leads some political officials to give privileges and positions of authority to relatives based on relationships and regardless of their actual abilities.
- Patronage systems consist of the granting favors, contracts, or appointments to positions by a local public office holder or candidate for a political office in return for political support. Many times patronage is used to gain support and votes in elections or in passing legislation. Patronage systems disregard the formal rules of a local government and use personal instead of formalized channels to gain an advantage.

=== Example(s) ===
According to the 2025 Corruption Perceptions Index (CPI), Somalia and South Sudan are considered the most corrupt countries in the world with a score of only 9 out of 100. For reference, the United States scored a 64, the United Kingdom scored 70, France scored 66, and Denmark scored 89 ranking number 1. This very low score in Somalia and South Sudan is linked with several traits such as weak institutions, instability, and prolonged conflict. Generally, countries at the bottom of the index tend to have unstable government and restricted civic freedoms. This then makes it difficult for individuals to get basic public services like school, infrastructure, and healthcare because the money meant for them is being stolen or mismanaged by government officials.

One of the most famous political scandals of the twentieth century is the Watergate incident in the United States. Officials working for Republican President Richard Nixon broke into the Democratic Party's office, using government resources to spy on and sabotage political opponents. In order to stay in power, they tried to hide the truth and cover up their crimes. This is a strong case of corruption because those in power broke the rules and abused their power and authority for a political party advantage.

== Demographic factors ==
Socioeconomic characteristics and the size of the population of people that make up a municipality can be encouraging factors for local government officials to engage in corrupt practices. Patterns of political corruption can be found in places that have a similar demographic makeup. Demographic factors that have been known to lead to or increase the likelihood of corruption in a local government system are size of the municipality, local economic conditions, education, political culture, age, gender, marital status, and religion. Some factors are interrelated or can lead to other factors which may cause more corruption.

=== Size of a municipality ===
Smaller municipalities may be more prone to experience corruption within their local government. These towns and villages nominate (or self-nominate) residents or officials to represent and run the local government, sometimes without oversight approval from higher levels of government. In a small community, personal opinions and relationships play a larger role in politics.

Due to this, problems like nepotism or extortion can be prevalent. In addition, some local governments face another kind of disadvantage: lack of experience and professionalism from their representatives. It can be a challenge to attract qualified up-and-coming politicians to small towns.

Another major issue in small municipalities lies with accountability — some have inadequate or insufficient structures for policing and prosecution of corrupt local officials, culminating in a difficult situation for those affected. With thousands of small towns in the United States handling a significant amount of public money, their few employees and limited budgets make it easier for corruption to take place since they don't have the resources to watch over everything carefully.

=== Education ===
Lower levels of education, which are often caused by poverty, are seen as a factor that encourages corrupt government practices. Those with less education are not as informed as to how the government works or what rights they have under the government. This makes it easier for corrupt office-holders to conceal corrupt activities from a poorly educated public since they are less likely to be aware of corruption in local governments or how to stop it. Without some kind of political awareness, citizens will not know which candidates to elect that are honest or dishonest or other ways to prevent corruption from taking place in their local governments. This often leads municipalities to be continually governed by one or more corrupt local officials, who use patronage or nepotistic practices to stay in office or keep influence in the government for long periods of time. When local political leaders are less educated, they will be less likely to find legitimate ways to make the municipality well-structured, productive, and successful.

=== Political culture of municipality ===
Many local governments have an established political culture with certain expectations about what behaviors are acceptable in local politics. In municipalities with an underdeveloped political culture, accountability and legitimacy are usually low and principles of ethics in government are not well established. This can allow corruption to persist because citizens may not recognize it, and local officials are not afraid to use this to their advantage. Research suggests that when corrupt behavior becomes socially normalized within a community, citizens may accept it as normal because it is all they have been exposed to. Long periods of political instability will also lead to corruption because people are unsure of how the government should operate, and thus do not know what practices are corrupt or how to stop them.

=== Individual-level determinants ===
There are several individual characteristics that can also influence one's perception of corrupt behavior including age, gender, marital status, and religion.

Age - Research suggests that younger individuals are generally more likely to justify corrupt practices, whereas older people tend to be less tolerant of it. As people get older, they get more life experience and a stronger understanding of certain practices, which makes them less willing to justify corruption.

Gender - In general, males are more likely than women to see corruption as acceptable and to engage in corrupt behavior. Studies find that women are less likely to offer or accept bribes and tend to tolerate corruption less than men. They value fairness and have stronger ethical concerns which further reduce their tolerance for corruption.

Marital status - Evidence indicates that being married can make individuals less likely to tolerate corrupt behavior. Unmarried people, on the other hand, including those that are single, divorced, or widowed, tend to be more accepting of corrupt practices. The life-course theory explains this difference by noting that marriage makes individuals more responsible and can encourage them to act more carefully and honestly.

Religion - Religion can affect how people view corruption in two ways: the type of religion they follow and how much they practice it. People in hierarchical religions like Catholicism, Eastern Orthodoxy, or Islam may be more likely to justify corruption, which people in more egalitarian religions like Protestantism tend to be less accepting of it. Additionally, people who pray more often are less likely to accept corruption, but oddly, those who go to services less frequently might sometimes be more tolerant.

== Effects of corruption ==
=== Political ===
Politically, corruption tends to weaken governments. Countries with high corruption often have weaker elections, less accountability, and lower citizen participation, while strong democracies usually have lower corruption. When leaders abuse their powers for personal gain, it can make elections unfair and reduce citizens' trust in government. As a result, people are discouraged from participating in politics, since they may feel that voting or even protesting won't make a difference. When people learn that politicians are corrupt, they are less likely to vote, even if those politicians provide public benefits. High corruption can also help populist or undemocratic leaders gain power, which further weakens democratic institutions and the rule of law. In countries with high corruption, government often fail to follow the law and protect citizens' rights. This can lead to political instability, conflicts, weaker institutions, and more difficulty for governments to function properly.

=== Economic ===
Economically, corruption greatly harms the economy of a nation by wasting money and resources. When leaders take bribes or misuse public money, less funding goes to public welfare services like schools, hospitals, and roads. Corruption reduces tax revenue and leads the government to spend money on projects that benefit officials rather than the public, making infrastructure and services worse, possibly slowing development in these areas. Corruption also makes it harder for businesses to grow because they often have to pay extra bribes to start or run their companies since government regulations give officials the power to approve or block things like licenses or contracts. When officials have this power they can demand bribes in exchange for letting businesses operate normally. Overall, corruption leads to a weak economy that slows growth, keeps people in poverty, and reduces access to healthcare and jobs.

=== Social ===
Socially, corruption hurts society in a number of different ways. It begins by creating a distance between people and the government, lowering people's trust and confidence in their leaders. When citizens see politicians or officials taking bribes or misusing public funds, they are less likely to believe that leaders are fair or honest, which can reduce engagement in their communities or in voting. Not only this but corruption can also make people feel unsafe or upset because it limits basic services like health care, education, infrastructure, and social programs, especially for poor and vulnerable groups. Schools may lack supplies, hospitals may be understaffed or under-equipped, infrastructure becomes unsafe, etc. While wealthy individuals have more power and opportunities to benefit from corruption, the poorer individuals are more likely to be taken advantage of and left behind, increasing inequality between the social classes. In some cases, witnessing a corrupt system can even affect people's mental health, causing stress, depression, and overall negative emotions in the public. If people believe that the system is unfair and won't change anytime soon, they may feel powerless and unmotivated. Others may feel more resentment and anger towards the system as they witness others succeed. Lastly, corruption can also increase violence, as higher levels of perceived corruption are linked to less peace and more crime in society. Since corruption weakens the government and law enforcement, it makes it easier for crime to spread leading to an unsafe and unstable society.

== Combating corruption ==
Open government policies such as transparency, accountability, and public participation have been implemented in many countries to strengthen trust in government and reduce opportunities for corruption. When governments make information available to the public and allow citizens to take part in decision-making, it becomes easier to monitor actions and identify misconduct. Many countries that follow these practices often encourage communication with the public, and invite them to provide any feedback they may have on policies. Public participation allows citizens to share their views, raise concerns, and influence decisions, which helps ensure that policies reflect public needs rather than private interests. These approaches have been shown to increase oversight, since more people are watching how decisions are made and how public resources are used. Tools such as citizen involvement and public oversight help make sure that government actions are visible and harder to hide, reducing opportunities for bribery or other misuse of funds. Governments are expected to clearly explain their actions and follow the laws accordingly. Strengthening these practices not only helps detect and prevent corruption but also improves confidence in the public and institutions by making the government more responsive, fair, and accessible to all citizens.
