= Bradford Keeney =

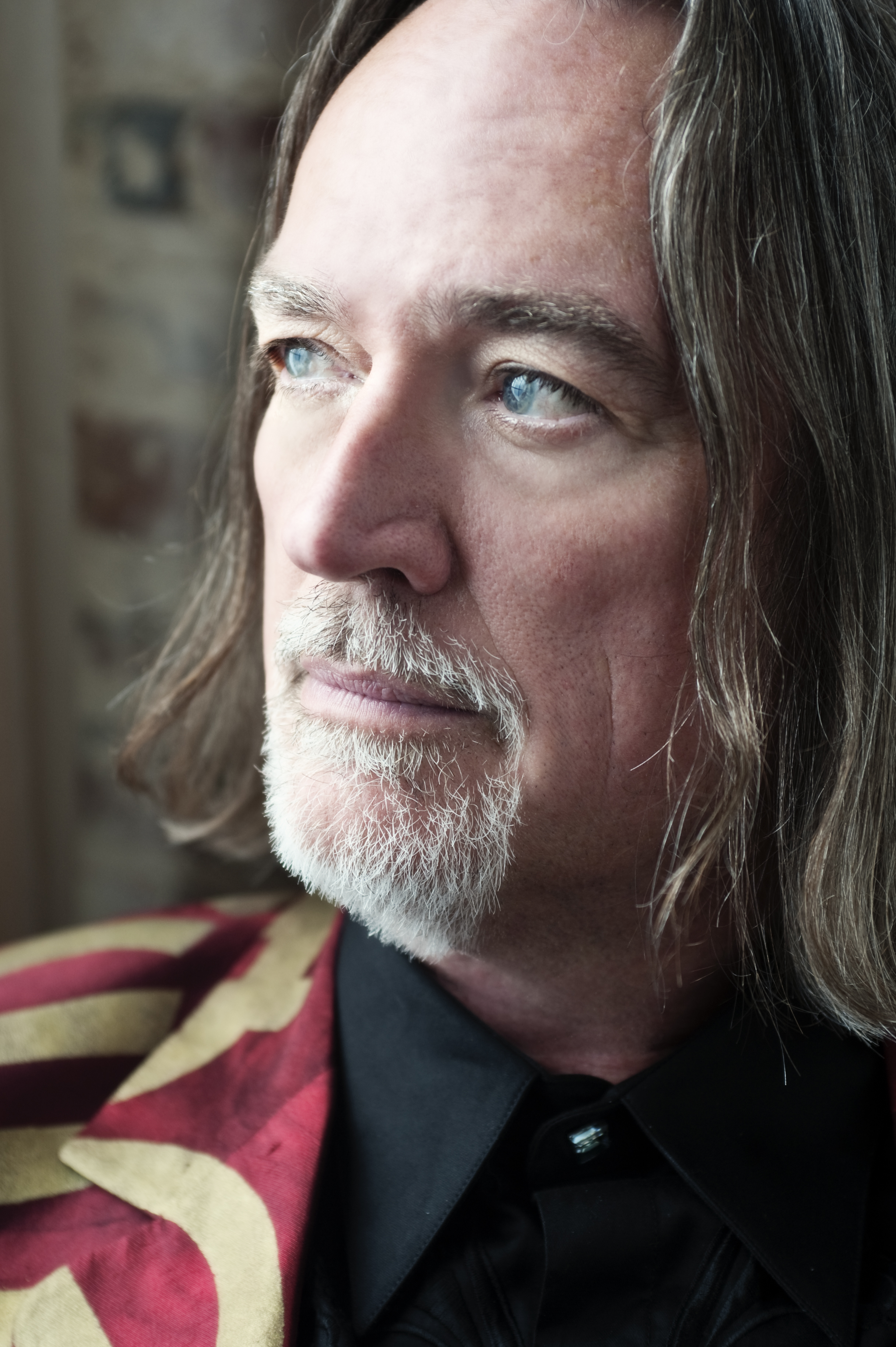
- Born: 1951 (age 74–75); Granite City, Illinois, US
- Known for: family systems therapy, brief therapy, systems psychology, Creativity in Therapy, Resource Focused Therapy, Recursive Frame Analysis, Psychotherapy as a Transformative Art
- Scientific career
- Fields: cybernetics, psychology, brief therapy, radical constructivism, Systems theory, ecstatic healing traditions

Bradford Keeney, Ph.D. (3 April 1951) is a creative therapist, cybernetician, anthropologist of cultural healing traditions, improvisational performer, and spiritual healer. Bradford Keeney has served as a professor, founder, and director of clinical doctoral programs in numerous universities. He is the originator of several orientations to psychotherapy including improvisational therapy, resource focused therapy, and creative therapy. He is the inventor of recursive frame analysis, a research method that discerns patterns of transformation in conversation. A Clinical Fellow of the American Association for Marriage and Family Therapy, he received the 2008 Distinguished Lifetime Achievement Award from the Louisiana Association for Marriage and Family Therapy.

As an ethnographic fieldworker, Keeney has been called the Marco Polo of psychology and an anthropologist of the spirit by the editors of Utne Reader. The result of Keeney's work is a field study of healing, chronicled in the book series Profiles of Healing, an eleven-volume encyclopaedia of the world's healing practices.

== Biography ==
Bradford Keeney was born in Granite City, Illinois, and grew up in Smithville, Missouri. In May 1969, he won a merit award from the American Medical Association, and later first place at the international science fair with a project called “An Experimental Study of the Effects of Hydrocortisone, Insulin, and Epinephrine on the Glycogen Content of Hepatic Tissues Perfused in Vitro.” This award earned him a scholarship to M.I.T. where he was first introduced to cybernetics and systems thinking. Fascinated by cybernetics, Keeney sought out Gregory Bateson, one of the world's leading cyberneticians, who became his friend and mentor. Keeney's doctoral dissertation (Purdue University, 1981) became the book Aesthetics of Change (1983), considered a seminal work in cybernetic theory and heralded by the likes of cybernetician and systems theorist Heinz von Foerster.

Bradford Keeney is married to and conducts all his work with Hillary Keeney, PhD, with whom he has co-authored seven books. He is the father of notable Los Angeles-based DJ, DJ Skee.

== Ethnographic Fieldwork, Ecstatic Healing and Spirituality ==
Since 1995, Bradford Keeney has travelled the globe conducting ethnographic studies of ecstatic healing traditions, focusing on “shaking medicine”. Keeney's work culminated in the creation of the Profiles of Healing series for the Ringing Rocks Foundation, describing ecstatic healing practices on four continents. Keeney's experiences were chronicled in the biography American Shaman. Currently, Keeney synthesizes what he learned from traditional and ecstatic healers with creative psychotherapy to add recursivity and performance to psychotherapeutic encounters.

With his wife, Hillary Keeney, he co-founded The Keeney Institute for Healing, dedicated to the development and dissemination of ecstatic healing and spirituality. The Keeney Institute conducts experiential training and education for healers, therapists, body workers, clergy, and the general public in the U.S. and at institutes throughout the globe. The work of the Keeney Institute is rooted to other ecstatic healing traditions including Kalahari Bushman (San) healing, the shakers of the Caribbean, and seiki jutsu Japanese energy medicine, among others.

Recognized as an ecstatic spiritual teacher and healer by numerous cultures, Keeney became a n/om-kxao (healer) with the Kalahari Bushmen. Megan Biesele, Ph.D., former member of the Harvard Kalahari Research Group, writes: "There is no question in the minds of the Bushman healers that Keeney's strength and purposes are coterminous with theirs. They affirmed his power as a healer."

== Work in cybernetics and psychotherapy ==
Keeney is known for several important contributions to the field of psychotherapy, through his application of cybernetics to the discipline. While serving with such institutions as the Menninger Foundation, the Philadelphia Child Guidance Clinic at the University of Pennsylvania, the Ackerman Institute for Family Therapy, and several universities throughout the United States, Dr. Keeney developed the following groundbreaking ideas.

In his early work, Keeney articulated patterns of communication for distinguished psychotherapists, later using his own psychotherapeutic cases to show how one can use psychotherapy as an art to create successful therapeutic transformation in clients. Some of his major works include Aesthetics of Change (1983), Mind in Therapy (1985), The Creative Therapist (2009), "Circular Therapeutics: Giving Therapy a Healing Heart" (with Hillary Keeney, 2012), Creative Therapeutic Technique" (with Hillary Keeney, 2013), and the Profiles of Healing series on ecstatic healing traditions sponsored by the Ringing Rocks Foundation (1999 – 2008). In 2010, Bradford Keeney and his wife, Hillary Keeney, created an online doctoral program in creative systemic studies at the University of Louisiana, Monroe. It is the first non-clinical MFT program of its kind dedicated to interdisciplinary scholarship and the study of cybernetics and systems thinking - the originating ideas of the field of systemic family therapy.

=== Recursive frame analysis ===
Keeney developed Recursive Frame Analysis (RFA) as a qualitative research method for discerning patterns in therapeutic conversation. It is a method he describes as “scoring” conversations, much as one would a song. Through RFA “…Keeney derived a series of distinctions which would allow therapists and researchers to describe interactional patterns in therapeutic discourse and to guide their practice in therapy.” RFA has been used in numerous dissertations and research studies. It is currently being used to demonstrate the different ways one can analyze conversation in a wide variety of conversational settings, including couples and family interaction, counseling, political diplomacy, and doctor-patient discourse.

=== Resource focused therapy ===
With his colleague Wendel Ray, Keeney created “Resource Focused Therapy.” Resource Focused Therapy is an approach to psychotherapy that pays little or no attention to problems or difficulties that have become pathologized. This form of therapeutic intervention focuses entirely on “bringing forth the natural resources of both clients and therapists”. This focus on resources is a recontextualization of information presented that therapeutically and creatively changes the way the client interacts with the world. It is a performative communication that occurs in acts, and looks to observers much more like an improvised play than classical therapy. The goal of this interaction is to transform the client's situation from one that is impoverished to one that amplifies resources and ability.

=== Creativity in therapy ===
Building on the concepts from his Resource Focused Therapy model, Keeney has developed a concept of creativity in therapy that moves beyond the norms of psychotherapy to view the therapist/client interaction as a transformative, performative, improvisational art. This work is based on clinical case studies that have been filmed and archived over the last decade. The theoretical model uses theories of improvisation in the performing arts and systemic ideas to provide a way of understanding how clinical sessions can become more creative and effective.

== Publications ==
Keeney has contributed to several publications.

Academic books

- 1983. Aesthetics of Change. New York: The Guilford Press.
- 1983. Diagnosis and Assessment in Family Therapy (Editor). Rockville, Maryland: Aspen Systems.
- 1985. Mind in Therapy: Constructing Systemic Family Therapies. With J. Ross. New York: Basic Books.
- 1986. The Therapeutic Voice of Olga Silverstein. With O. Silverstein. New York: The Guilford Press.
- 1987. Constructing Therapeutic Realities. Dortmund, Germany: Verlag fur Modernes Lernen.
- 1988. Kultur und Spiel, With Gregory Bateson. Suhrkamp, Ffm.
- 1990. The Systemic Therapist, Volume I (Editor), St. Paul: Systemic Therapy Press.
- 1990. The Systemic Therapist, Volume II (Editor), St. Paul: Systemic Therapy Press.
- 1991. Improvisational Therapy: A Practical Guide for Creative Clinical Strategies, New York: The Guilford Press.
- 1993. Resource Focused Therapy. With W. Ray. Karnac Books.
- 2006. Milton H. Erickson, M.D.: An American Healer. With B.A. Erickson. Philadelphia: Ringing Rocks Press.
- 2009. The Creative Therapist: The Art of Awakening a Clinical Session. New York: Routledge.
- 2012. "Circular Therapeutics: Giving Therapy a Healing Heart." with Hillary Keeney. Phoenix, AZ: Zeig, Tucker, & Theisen, Inc.
- 2013. "Creative Therapeutic Technique: Skills for the Art of Bringing Forth Change." with Hillary Keeney. Phoenix, AZ: Zeig, Tucker, & Theisen, Inc.

Press Books:

- 1995. Shaking Out the Spirits, New York: Station Hill Press.
- 1995. The Lunatic Guide to the David Letterman Show (Experiments with Absurd Social Interventions), New York: Station Hill Press.
- 1996. Crazy Wisdom Tales, New York: Barrytown Press.
- 1996. Everyday Soul, New York: Riverhead/Putnam.
- 1998. The Energy Break (The Practice of Autokinetics), New York: Golden Books, 1998.
- 2005. Bushman Shaman: Awakening the Spirit through Ecstatic Dance, Rochester, Vermont: Destiny Books.
- 2006. Shamanic Christianity: The Direct Experience of Mystical Communion, Rochester, Vermont: Destiny Books.
- 2007. Shaking Medicine, Rochester, Vermont: Inner Traditions.
- 2010. Bushman Way of Tracking God, New York, NY: Atria Books/Beyond Words.
  - Winner of a Silver Nautilus Book Award for the category "Multicultural/Indigenous".
- 2011. The Flying Drum: The Mojo Doctor's Guide to Creating Magic in Your Life, New York, NY: Atria Books/Beyond Words.
- 2014: Seiki Jutsu: The Practice of Non-Subtle Energy Medicine. with Hillary Keeney. Rochester, VT: Inner Traditions/Bear & Company.

== See also ==
- Complex systems
- Constructivist epistemology
- Cybernetics
- Family therapy
- Second-order cybernetics
- Systems thinking
- Systems psychology
