= Val Curtis =

British scientist (1958–2020)

- Born: 20 September 1958; Cumberland, England
- Died: 19 October 2020 (aged 62)
- Education: University of Leeds; London School of Hygiene and Tropical Medicine; Wageningen Agricultural University
- Known for: WASH policy; Behaviour Centred Design; Disgustology
- Spouse: Robert Aunger
- Children: 2
- Scientific career
- Fields: Public health; human behaviour
- Workplaces: London School of Hygiene and Tropical Medicine
- Thesis: The Dangers of Dirt: Household Hygiene and Health (1998)
- Academic advisors: Anke Niehof, Thierry Mertens

Valerie Ann Curtis (20 September 1958 – 19 October 2020) was a British scientist who was Director of the Environmental Health Group at the London School of Hygiene and Tropical Medicine. This is a multidisciplinary group dedicated to improving hygiene, sanitation and water in households and schools through enhancing knowledge.

Curtis had a background in engineering, epidemiology and anthropology, and had a particular interest in human behaviour, especially from an evolutionary perspective. She applied these to hygiene and sanitation, using an approach known as Behaviour Centred Design for improvements in hygiene, sanitation, nutrition, product development and other behaviour-related problems in WASH policy.

== Career ==
=== Early career ===
After gaining her first degree, Curtis worked for the engineering company Arup in building construction for four years and then several charities including the Red Cross and Save the Children in countries – including Ethiopia, Kenya, Iraq and Uganda – during civil wars and famines. During this time, although she was generally employed to install new technology for clean water supplies, it became clear to her that changes in human behaviour, rather than in technology, would be more effective in improving hygiene. She undertook Masters and doctoral degrees to help her fulfil her aims.

She was appointed as a research fellow in maternal and child epidemiology at the London School of Hygiene and Tropical Medicine in 1989 and remained there throughout her career. She became a lecturer in 1996 and was promoted to a professorship.

Her unusual multidisciplinary background and extensive personal field experience in many countries gave her a broad perspective on domestic hygiene and sanitation and also allowed her to develop an evolutionary theory for the concept of disgust. Her primary scientific interest was in behaviour and during her career she saw this field change from a predominately descriptive subject to something that was much more quantitative and predictive.

=== Handwashing in public health ===
Her interests focused on hygiene behaviour in humans from the 1990s onwards. She spent most of the 1990s with colleagues in Burkina Faso as co-ordinator of projects related to the risk factors for childhood diarrhea and trials of hygiene promotion publicity. It became apparent that changing behaviour, rather than increased public health information, was the key for making changes. Mothers did not wash their hands after handling children's excrement even though they already knew that handwashing was important to keep their children healthy.

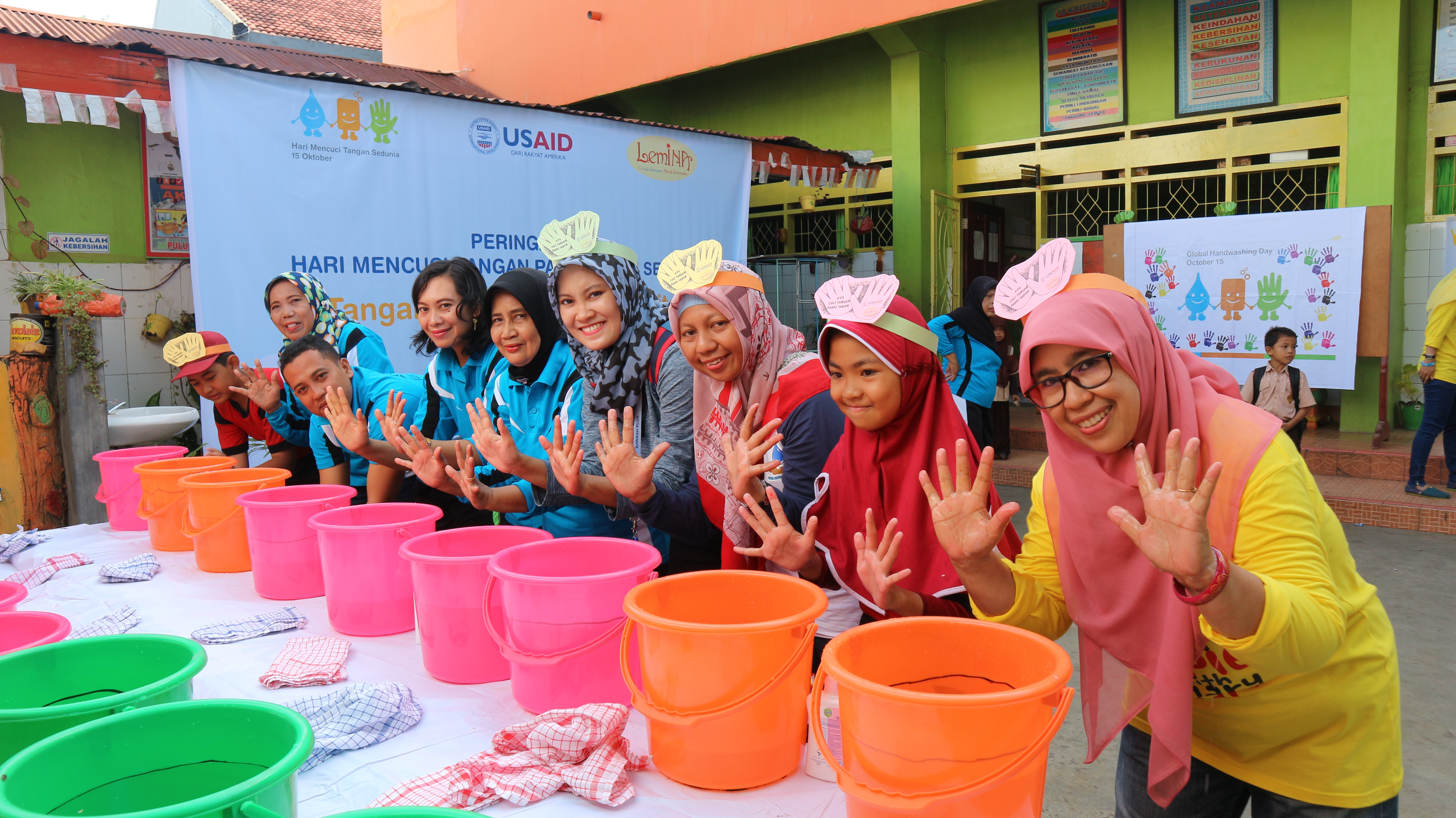
Global Handwashing Day in Paccinang Elementary School, Makassar city, Indonesia, 2017

Curtis and her colleagues also realised that there were also significant problems in measuring and recording private hygiene behaviour to determine if an intervention had been of value. Working with colleagues she developed methods to study this behaviour. One innovation was to embed an accelerometer into soap to provide an objective measure of movement. Their systematic review about the use of soap in handwashing (published in 2003 in Lancet Infectious Disease) contained the evidence and ideas that brought together organisations such as governments, the World Bank and private companies to increase handwashing with soap for the benefit of public health and commerce. She was among the founders of this collaboration among universities, companies that produce personal care products and international organisations that has become the Global Handwashing Partnership. It has the objective to make everyone wash their hands with soap at key moments to prevent disease transmission. The partnership has run programmes in 12 countries including Kyrgyzstan, Vietnam, Peru and Senegal.

In 2008 the organisation started Global Handwashing Day, held annually on 15 October worldwide. For the first of these events she demonstrated that a lack of handwashing was also a problem in developed countries like the UK through finding that the hands of more than a quarter of bus and train commuters were contaminated with faecal bacteria. Curtis also began to describe herself as a 'disgustologist' as an accessible name for her work. In 2009 she received the award "Health Communicator of the Year" from the British Medical Journal.

=== Evolutionary basis for the emotion of disgust ===
From 2010 onwards, Curtis made progress in providing the theoretical framework for human reactions to excrement, which causes the emotion of disgust worldwide. She considered this response to have evolved for protection against the pathogens and parasites it contains and to be a very old and basic human motivation. Other motives such as nurture and status could also be used to encourage routine handwashing. Following from information gained in a study in 2004, where photographs were evaluated by 40,000 participants for how disgusting they were perceived, by 2011 Curtis was able to propose a theoretical framework. She brought her ideas together in her 2013 book Don't look, don't touch: the science behind revulsion which lays out the idea that disgust is a universal human emotion and proposes how this understanding can be used to change behaviour in areas as diverse as improved hygiene and reduced prejudice and disease. Another book Gaining Control: How human behavior evolved was about the evolution of behaviour.

=== Behaviour Centred Design ===
Her ideas came together using the concept of Behaviour Centred Design that Curtis was able to develop more fully and apply to more situations from the 2010s. It made use of the concept of behaviour settings introduced by Roger Barker. One result was to realised that changing the setting in which a sanitation behaviour has to be carried out was important so that it could be done more easily and be seen as modern and desirable. This could involve new technological innovations. In addition an increase in interdisciplinary work with communication specialists and psychologists was needed to work out how this objective could be achieved and to publicise new effective approaches.

=== Public policy advisor ===
Curtis was an advisor to governments, including in India (the Swachh Bharat Mission) and Tanzania, on sanitation campaigns. She advised the UK government during the 2020 coronavirus pandemic, as a member of the Scientific Pandemic Influenza Group on Behaviours (SPI-B), on how to encourage people to adhere to recommendations. During the pandemic she also contributed to the work of Independent SAGE.

== Publications ==
Curtis is the author or co-author of over 120 scientific publications, conferences papers, books and reports. Among them are:

=== Books ===
- Robert Aunger and Valerie Curtis (2015) Gaining Control: How human behavior evolved Oxford University Press, 176 pp ISBN 9780199688951
- Valerie Curtis (2013) Don't look, don't touch: the science behind revulsion The University of Chicago Press, 184pp ISBN 9780226131337

=== Scientific papers ===
- Chris Bonell, Susan Michie, Stephen Reicher, Robert West, Laura Bear, Lucy Yardley, Val Curtis, Richard Amlot and James G Rubin (2020) Harnessing behavioural science in public health campaigns to maintain 'social distancing' in response to the COVID-19 pandemic: key principles. Journal of Epidemiology and Community Health 74 617-619
- Annette Pruess-Ustuen, Jamie Bartram, Thomas Clasen, and 17 other authors including Valerie Curtis (2014) Burden of disease from inadequate water, sanitation and hygiene in low- and middle-income settings: a retrospective analysis of data from 145 countries. Tropical Medicine and International Health 19 894-905
- Valerie Curtis, Michael de Barra and Robert Aunger (2011) Disgust as an adaptive system for disease avoidance behaviour. Philosophical Transactions of the Royal Society B: Biological Sciences
- Valerie A Curtis, Lisa O Danquah and Robert V Aunger (2009) Planned, motivated and habitual hygiene behaviour: an eleven country review. Health Education Research 24 655-673
- Valerie Curtis, Robert Aunger and Tamer Rabie (2004) Evidence that disgust evolved to protect from risk of disease. Proceedings of the Royal Society B – Biological Sciences 271 Supplement 4Pages S131-S133
- Valerie Curtis and Yonli Cairncross (2003) Effect of washing hands with soap on diarrhoea risk in the community: a systematic review. Lancet Infectious Diseases 3 275-281
- Simon Cousens, Bernadette Kanki, Seydou Toure, Ibrahim Diallo and Valerie Curtis (1996) Reactivity and repeatability of hygiene behaviour: Structured observations from Burkina Faso. Social Science and Medicine 43 1299–1308

== Personal life ==
Curtis was born in the Cumberland region of England. She attended the Queen's School, Chester and then studied B.Sc. civil engineering at University of Leeds, graduating in 1980. She was awarded an M.Sc. in Community Health and Development from the London School of Hygiene and Tropical Medicine in 1988. She followed these with a doctoral degree in the area of anthropology from Wageningen Agricultural University, Netherlands advised by Anke Niehof and Thierry Mertens, that was awarded in 1998. She had two children and was married to Robert Aunger.

She was diagnosed with cancer in summer 2018, and after learning in February 2020 that it could no longer be treated, became involved in campaigning against the effects of government austerity on the UK National Health Service.
