= Eric Siday =

- Born: Eric Siday; 1 November 1905; Ealing, London
- Died: 25 March 1976 (aged 70); New York City, New York
- Genre: Electroacoustic
- Occupations: Composer, musician & Gentleman Driver
- Years active: 1927–1976

Eric Alexander Siday (1 November 1905 – 26 March 1976) was a British-American composer and musician. He first became known as a hot-jazz violinist in the London dance bands of the 1920s. But his later career, as one of the first composers of commercial music, jingles, station identification and "signature music" in the United States, led Time Magazine in 1966 to describe him as "one of the highest-paid and most frequently played composers in the world". As part of his work he became one of the pioneers of electroacoustic music.

== Early career ==
Born in Ealing, West London, Siday was the son of an accountant, George Siday. The family address was 30, Kent Gardens, W5. He showed musical promise early and entered the Royal Academy of Music in 1919 at the age of 14, studying violin and piano, though he was also proficient on trumpet, clarinet, and saxophone. Siday won the Sainton Scholarship for violin in 1923. During his studies he also worked as an accompanist for silent films, and began playing with dance bands from the early 1920s, including with Jack Hylton and with Ray Starita's Piccadilly Revels, which played for the Revels cabaret and floorshow at the Piccadilly Hotel from 1927. As a young violinist his improvised soloing was advanced for its time. He played with a modern chromatic style, verging on atonal, often incorporating multi-stops, playing up to four notes in harmony on the violin simultaneously using multiple fingers.

In 1939, he emigrated to New York, signing up as a violinist and arranger for Fred Waring and His Pennsylvanians and performing in the bands of Al Goodman, Allan Roth and Ray Noble among others. During the Second World War he worked as an arranger for the Office of War Information. In 1947 Variety described him as "a flash fiddler".

== Music for television advertising ==
Using the name Adam B. Kent, Siday teamed up with Austen Croom-Johnson (whom he had known at the BBC in London) on the jingle 'Pepsi Cola Hits the Spot' in 1939. It is said to have been the first nationally broadcast jingle. Siday was also the first composer to systematically use electronic sound sources, tape manipulation and new electronic instruments within the television medium, particularly with his invention of the sound logo. His Maxwell House "Percolator" TV commercial, used from the 1950s ownwards, was one of these first innovations. The Maxwell House theme was probably initially created using layered tape loops with tuned percussion as the sound source, but may have been re-fashioned in later years using a custom Moog sequencer. Siday commissioned Robert Moog to create the first percussion synthesizer, which he used extensively in his television work.

Other advertising clients included AAMCO, Birds Eye, Bufferin, Contac, Excedrin, Ford, Helena Rubinstein, Listerine, Old Spice, Sprite, Texaco and Vicks. Among his other contributions using electro-acoustic music for television were numerous station IDs, including that of the National Educational Television network (the forerunner to PBS), the 1966 CBS "in color" bumper, the news sounder for the ABC Radio Networks, and the 1965–1976 Screen Gems/Columbia Pictures Television logos. Siday developed the concept of "identitones" or sound logos, for stations and product bands, and set up a company (Identitones Inc) to exploit them. His 1963 sound logo for Westinghouse has a score only six measures long.

Time Magazine interviewed Siday in 1966:

“The ear of the world is satiated by conventional music,” explains Siday. “To grasp a listener today, you have to give him something new.” The whole trick lies in “the art of miniaturization —saying something that instantly stands for a corporation’s personality.” His instructions for the signature music for American Express were that it should say “America, business, travel.” The America part was easy; he simply recorded six notes of the national anthem, then added a dash of business and travel by “tricking the tape up a bit” with his machines. What these signatures say to Siday is money. None of them last longer than seven seconds, and he is paid at the average rate of $5,000 for each second.

== Extended and experimental works ==
In addition to his large commercial repertoire, he composed a number of extended works, both traditional and experimental. These include traditional pieces such as Concerto Ritmico, the Lament in G Minor, and Lullaby, and electronic works such as Islands (assembled as multi-track recording) and Moog Man (for synthesizer and vocalist). In the years before his death he devoted considerable effort to exploring new ways in which to use electro-acoustic music in the building of special sound environments. Use of new music through practical design concepts was his forte. His home studio occupied two rooms of the ten-room apartment he shared with his wife Edith in the prestigious Apthorp building, had 3-track, and later 8-track recording capabilities, and included the second ever Moog synthesiser (acquired in 1965) alongside an Ondes Martenot. Siday invented his own audio processing equipment and took out patents for them.

Throughout his life Siday was an educator, creating many radio broadcasts about the nature of the so-called new music and new sound. He also used these techniques in stories for children, including texts narrated by the actress Hermione Gingold with synthesizer-produced music and sound effects.

== Motorsport ==
In 1931 Siday purchased a Frazer Nash Sports Ulster fitted with a supercharged 1.5 litre Meadows Engine, with registration HX3535 which the car still holds today. He was subsequently invited to join the AFN works team for the 1932 German Grand Prix automobile d'Allemagne held at the Nürburgring Nordschleife circuit on 17 July 1932. He drove the car from London and qualified fifth in class. There was interest in how Siday and teammate Archie Fane would perform in the new "blown" ohv cars but the car was withdrawn on lap 12 with a leaking fuel tank. Siday later wrote in this diary later that the leak was due to the appalling roads in Belgium.

== Personal life ==
Siday's younger brother was R.E. Siday, a mathematician who specialised in quantum mechanics.

Siday married Edith (née Gerber) Siday (1908-1997), a dancer, during World War II.

He died of a heart attack in 1976, aged 71, at his Apthorp apartment on 390 West End Avenue. Memorial services were held at Riverside Memorial Chapel.

== Legacy ==
The Eric and Edith Siday Charitable Foundation was established in 1998 in memory of the composer Siday and his wife Edith. The Foundation is dedicated, among other things, to the promotion of musical creativity, among both professionals and gifted, underprivileged youths.

In 2020, the Israel Festival in Jerusalem featured an orchestral tribute to Siday, performed by Castle in Time Orchestra and the Lab Orchestra, under the direction of composers Stephen Horenstein and Matan Daskal.

In 2024, Castle in Time Orchestra and the Lab Orchestra released Sounds of Siday: Side A and Side B. Side A features a 25-minute electro-acoustic piece composed by Matan Daskal, inspired by Siday's miniatures and musical logos. Side B includes a piece by Stephen Horenstein (who was responsible for digitizing Siday’s archive at the Lincoln Center and The New York Public Library) and features a narration by Siday on the importance of a mother’s heartbeat for humans. The project was supported by the Eric and Edith Siday Charitable Foundation.

His archives, which included business records, personal papers, music scores, photographs, and tapes, were donated to the New York Public Library.
