= Staffing theory =

Social psychology theory

Staffing theory is a social psychology theory that explores the effects of behavior settings being either understaffed or overstaffed. Understaffing refers to the idea that there are not enough people for what the behavior setting promotes, whereas overstaffing is an overabundance of people. The term staffing theory was previously known as "manning theory," but was renamed.

Staffing theory focused on the idea that when there are fewer people available for a number of behavior settings, there is pressure on individuals to take on responsibilities. A behavior setting is a physical location, temporally or physically bound, that influences the behavior of the people within it. The concept of staffing theory comes from research done by Barker & Gump entitled Big School, Small School. Synomorphy, which is the degree of fit between a behavior setting and the individuals within it, is an important concept for understanding Staffing Theory. When a place is high in synomorphy, the number of people and the types of tasks being performed match what the behavior setting provides, and the individuals can achieve maximum productivity.

== Background research ==
The ideas that led to the development of staffing theory came primarily from Roger Barker and Paul Gump, who were researchers stationed at the University of Kansas. Barker and Gump paved the road for what is now known as ecological psychology, as well as developing concepts such as behavior settings and synomorphy. In Barker and Gump's 1964 work, Big School, Small School, the two researchers examined environmental factors as well as students' behaviors in multiple schools in northeast Kansas. More specifically, Barker and Gump were interested in whether the size of high schools had a significant effect on students' participation in and satisfaction with school activities. They started their investigation by calculating population (P) and the number of behavioral settings, or differentiation (D) values for each school. Some examples of the types of behavior settings are classes, halls, gymnasiums, administrator's offices, and lunch rooms. The data they collected had one primary interpretation: as P increases, so too does D, but not as fast. In other words, as population increases, the P/D ratio becomes smaller. These findings contradict the idea that big schools offer more opportunities for students.

Barker and Gump examined the relationship between school size and number of extra curricular activities reported by graduating Seniors. They did this by examining yearbooks, which recorded the activities that the Seniors participated in for all four years of their high school education. They found that as school size increases, the number of activities that students participate in goes down.

A third investigation by Barker and Gump looked at forces that led students toward participation in relation to school size. They divided schools into either the big school or the small school category. They also differentiated students as being either regular students or marginal students. Marginal students were students who had low IQ, poor academic performance as indicated by grades, a father in a nonprofessional occupation, a father who did not finish high school, or a mother who did not finish high school. What they found is that, for external pressures toward participation, the mean number of forces indicated was 7.4 for small school regular students, 7.2 for small school marginal students, 5.6 for large school regular students, and 1.5 for large school marginal students. This pattern clearly indicates that students feel there are more external pressures to participate in small schools compared to big schools, and that large school marginal students perceive by far the fewest pressures to participate.

== Research extensions ==
Besides Roger Barker, one other pioneer in the research of staffing behavior settings is Allen Wicker. Following in the footsteps of Robert Barker and Paul Gump, Wicker also looked closely at behavior settings and number of staff. Much of what Barker and Gump concluded in their Big School Small School research was also repeated by Wicker who nearly replicated the original research. He looked into small and large northeast Kansas schools much like Barker and Gump. He found that small schools offered more behavior settings relative to population (understaffing), which Barker and Gump assessed as having more beneficial experiences. Wicker took more of a stance on the behavior setting itself as opposed to the staff working in the behavior setting. Wicker examined juniors in four small high schools and compared them to juniors of one large high school. In the end he concluded that while the small schools ultimately supplied more understaffed behavior setting some settings in the small school were overstaffed (i.e. a popular sport). Likewise, in the large school some behavior settings were understaffed. In both small and large schools, Wicker showed that members who were engaged in leadership roles would report a more positive experience.

== Interpretation and implications ==
There are many ways that people can incorporate the use of this theory into their work, study or leadership settings. With the understanding that as overstaffing increases, the amount of individual responsibility decreases, we can see other sorts of group dynamic processes take effect such as social loafing. With this in mind, group members could try and counteract such negative behaviors by changing the P/D ratio so that there is more work to do or that there are activities/labor to keep the individuals occupied. If nothing else, anticipating problems and being able to prepare for them would be especially helpful to leaders and their roles. The biggest implication that we get from this theory is that if we want people to get the most out of an experience, but not necessarily be an expert in any one particular field of study or work area, they should have a good balance between the number of people working and the number of people that the environment provides for. This way they have the social pressure to prepare and perform for a given task, and should have diverse capability based on whatever they get involved with. There are a few dangers that must be looked out for when trying to find this balance. Too many activities or too much labor might result in the group not being able to complete anything, thus doing poorly in multiple categories instead of excelling. In contrast having too few responsibilities will likely not keep the group members motivated and may cause problems as well.
