= William Howgill =

English organist and composer

William Howgill (1768/9–1824), was an English organist and composer.

Howgill was the son of William Howgill, organist at Whitehaven; he took his father's position after his death in 1790. Some years later, probably in 1810, he moved to London.

He published 32 pieces between 1791 and 1824, including

- 'Four Voluntaries, part of the 3rd Chapter of the Wisdom of Solomon for three Voices, and six favourite Psalm Tunes, with an Accompaniment for the Organ,' London [1825?].
- 'Two Voluntaries for the Organ, with a Miserere and Gloria Tibi, Domine.'
- 'An Anthem and two Preludes for the Organ.'

His sister Ann Howgill (1775-?) was also an organist, holding positions at Staindrop and Penrith.
