= Behavior settings =

General Psychology

Behavior settings are theorized entities that help explain the relationship between individuals and the environment - particularly the social environment. This topic is typically indexed under the larger rubric of ecological (or environmental) psychology. However, the notion of behavior setting is offered here in more detail and with more specificity than is found in the larger entry under ecological psychology or environmental psychology.

There has been a tendency in the social sciences generally to polarize arguments about consciousness, identity, behavior, and culture around either the mind existing 'in the head' or the mind being an artifact of social interaction. Mind—in the sense used here—is understood as the motivation for behavior. Evidence indicates that both of these 'facts' are accurate. One of the problems social scientists have is understanding this paradox. Behavior settings are mediating structures that help explain the relationship between the dynamic behavior of individuals and stable social structure. Social scientist Roger Barker first developed this theoretical framework in the late 1940s.

Behavior settings also may serve as a bridge between the foundational work of Humberto Maturana & Francisco Varela on Autopoiesis and the insights developed in American pragmatism and Continental activity theory.

A behavior setting exists at the interface between the standing patterns of behavior and the milieu (environment), wherein the behavior is happening in the milieu, and the milieu in some sense matches the behavior. In technical parlance, the "behavior-milieu interface" is called the synomorph, and the milieu is said to be circumjacent and synomorphic to the behavior.

In a dentist's office, for example, "patients get their cavities filled". This is the standing pattern (the behavior/milieu part or synomorph) because we are in the office (the milieu surrounds us, i.e., it is circumjacent) and the pieces of the milieu fit the standing pattern (the drill is meant to fit in my mouth and drill my tooth, i.e. synomorphic with the behavior). Further, to be considered a behavior setting, these behavior/milieu parts or synomorphs must have a specific degree of interdependence that is greater than their interdependence with other parts of other settings.

There is an empirical test that can determine the relative robustness of behavior settings, depending on the index of interdependence between and among specific standing patterns of behavior. By itself, a standing pattern of behavior is meaningless; it would be like watching a person pretending to go to the dentist's office and having a cavity filled. Also, a dentist's office without patients (or the possibility of patients) would be a meaningless artifact.

So, a behavior setting is a self-referenced (internally interdependent and self-defined) entity that consists of one or more standing patterns of behavior. Just as the standing pattern is synomorphic with the artifacts in the milieu, so are standing patterns synomorphic with other standing patterns in the behavior setting. We see in the eminent ecological psychologist, Roger G. Barker's conception, an elegant and stable view of the nested interrelationships that exist within our common experience. The pieces fit, and in their fitting we see the larger structure-in-a-context that is necessary for making claims about development, causality, or purpose.

== Ecological units ==
Ecological units exist at the interface between the ecological environment and certain practice of molar behavior. These units exist in the physiological, social, psychological, and behavioral realms and share three common attributes:

- they are self-generated, as opposed to resulting from the observer's or researchers interest or manipulation;
- they have a time-space locus; and
- they have a boundary separating the internal pattern of the unit from the external pattern of surround.

An ecological unit is a composite of an environment piece and a behavior piece. They are hybrid artifacts that exist as quasi-objective entities, much like Searle's "observer-relative features of the world". An example that Barker used in 1968 is a road—a road is a track (physical feature) used for travelling or carrying goods (expression of 'molar behavior'). The coupling of a molar behavior to an environmental feature (affordance) is the mechanism through which the reciprocal relations between different levels of nested or related phenomena occur. The ecological unit is the foundation for the concept of a 'behavior setting' which was defined above. More generally, it seems that this notion captures the relationship of any organism to its niche and is captured by Reed in his 1996 discussion of the 'affordance'.

Barker also develops a useful analogy for conceptualizing this relation, as well as preparing readers for later claims about behavior settings. He observes that 'molar behavior' is to the 'ecological environment', just as 'visual perception' is to 'light'; i.e., in order to understand visual perception, you have to understand light, independent from visual perception. If we were only to look at the eye-optic channel at the instant that light hit the receptor surface, we would know nothing of depth of field, focus, or perspective.

The behavior setting concept could be very useful in the field of architectural programming, architectural design, as well as in urban planning and design. It is the very challenge for behavior setting theory today to be used in those fields: architects and behavioral scientists still are not in full contact in design and research issues. The kind of ecological unity devised by Roger Barker connects strongly and consistently behavior and physical features of ordinary - and those not-so-ordinary settings in universities, labs, hospitals, etc.

== Surveying a behavior setting ==
According to Barker in 1968, conducting a behavior setting survey consists of the measurement of eleven key descriptive attributes:

- Occurrence
- Duration
- Population
- Occupancy Time
- Penetration
- Action Patterns
- Behavior Mechanisms
- Richness
- Pressure
- Welfare
- Local Autonomy

There are two temporal attributes: Occurrence (O), the number of days in a year the behavior setting is capable of occurring, and Duration (D), the number of hours the behavior setting functions during a year. Population (P) is the number of different persons who inhabit the behavior setting during the year. These three basic attributes allow for a calculation of Occupancy Time (OT), the number of person-hours spent in the behavior setting. It is the product of the occurrences (O), the average number of inhabitants per occurrence (P/O), and the average duration per occurrence (D/O).

Penetration (Pe) is the degree to which an inhabitant is involved in the setting and consists of six incremental zones, ranging from onlooker to leader. Using these divisions, the average depth of penetration can be determined for population subgroups (e.g., frequency of minority students being leaders in a club).

Action Patterns (AP) are the functional attributes of the patterns of behavior (e.g., religion, education, and recreation). For each action variable, researchers note the activity's frequency (participation subscale), its production of materials for use in another setting (supply subscale), and whether the activity is evaluated (appreciation subscale). Behavior Mechanisms (BM) are the modalities through which behavior is implemented in the setting, such as gross motor activity, talking, or thinking. Researchers note each mechanism's frequency (participation subscale), the speed of the behavior (tempo subscale), and the expenditure of energy (intensity subscale).

Richness is a composite measure of the variety of behavior within the setting. It is computed from the prior attributes using the following formula: (ΣPe + ΣAP + ΣBM)OT/100

Pressure is the degree to which external forces act upon a person to approach/enter or avoid/withdraw from the setting. For example, a setting can be required (a child is for a class at school), invited (a child welcomed to a Sunday School class), or prohibited (a child is excluded from a bar). Welfare is the relevance of the setting to a particular group of inhabitants; that is, whether the group is served by the setting, whether the group serves others in the setting, or whether the setting instigates and supports other settings relevant to the group. Finally, the Local Autonomy of the behavior setting is the geographic level at which the setting's operations are determined (e.g., town, district, county, state).
