= John Woodcock Graves =

English-born Australian poet and composer

John Woodcock Graves (9 February 1795 – 17 August 1886) was a composer and author of "D'ye ken John Peel".

== Life ==
Graves was born in Wigton, Cumberland, England to Joseph Graves and his wife Ann, née Matthews.

Graves neglected his woollen mills and lost a court case concerning it.

He was married twice: firstly to Jane Atkinson and secondly to Abigail Porthouse.

In 1958 a memorial to him was erected in St David's Park. Sidney Gilpin's The Songs and Ballads of Cumberland includes six poems by Graves. For a while he was an inmate in Lachlan Park Hospital (later the Royal Derwent Hospital) against his will but escaped by persuading a visiting judge to allow him to paint a mural of a Kangaroo hunt on the walls of the courtyard. Requesting the use of a ladder to finish painting the sky, he absconded over the wall and used his huntsman's technique to evade pursuing captors.

Graves died in Hobart and was buried at Queenborough Cemetery near Sandy Bay. In 2024, Graves' body was one of nearly 2000 remains discovered during the construction of new buildings for The Hutchins School which is located on the former Queenborough Cemetery site. Graves' body was supposed to have been exhumed and relocated to Cornelian Bay Cemetery in the 1960s.
