= Applied psychology =

Application of psychological theories or findings

Applied psychology is the use of psychological methods and findings of scientific psychology to solve practical problems of human and animal behavior and experience. Educational and organizational psychology, business management, law, health, product design, ergonomics, behavioural psychology, psychology of motivation, psychoanalysis, neuropsychology, psychiatry and mental health are just a few of the areas that have been influenced by the application of psychological principles and scientific findings. Some of the areas of applied psychology include counseling psychology, industrial and organizational psychology, engineering psychology, occupational health psychology, legal psychology, school psychology, sports psychology, community psychology, neuropsychology, medical psychology and clinical psychology, evolutionary psychology, human factors, forensic psychology and traffic psychology. In addition, a number of specialized areas in the general area of psychology have applied branches (e.g., applied social psychology, applied cognitive psychology). However, the lines between sub-branch specializations and major applied psychology categories are often mixed or in some cases blurred.

For example, a human factors psychologist might use a cognitive psychology theory. This could be described as human factor psychology or as applied cognitive psychology. When applied psychology is used in the treatment of behavioral disorders there are many experimental approaches to try to treat an individual. This type of psychology can be found in many of the subbranches in other fields of psychology.

== History ==
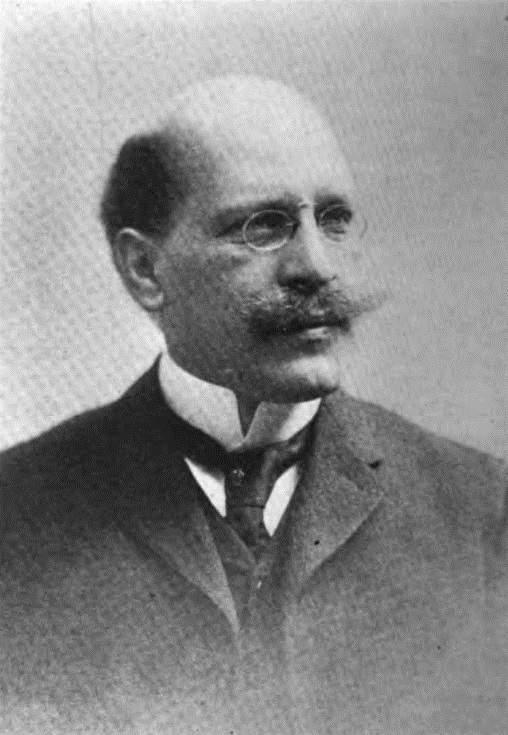
Photo of Hugo Münsterberg

The founder of applied psychology was Hugo Münsterberg. He came to America (Harvard) from Germany (Berlin, Laboratory of Stern), invited by William James, and, like many aspiring psychologists during the late 19th century, originally studied philosophy. Münsterberg had many interests in the field of psychology such as purposive psychology, social psychology and forensic psychology. Hugo Münsterberg is credited with being one of the first people who has researched the field of applied psychology. He went to the University of Leipzig in Germany and attained his doctorate in Medicine. He opened the second psychology clinic in Germany in 1891 where he has continued his research. In 1907 he wrote several magazine articles concerning legal aspects of testimony, confessions and courtroom procedures, which eventually developed into his book, On the Witness Stand. The following year the Division of Applied Psychology was adjoined to the Harvard Psychological Laboratory. Within 9 years he had contributed eight books in English, applying psychology to education, industrial efficiency, business and teaching. Eventually Hugo Münsterberg and his contributions would define him as the creator of applied psychology. In 1920, the International Association of Applied Psychology (IAAP) was founded, as the first international scholarly society within the field of psychology.

Most professional psychologists in the U.S. worked in an academic setting until World War II. But during the war, the armed forces and the Office of Strategic Services hired psychologists in droves to work on issues such as troop morale and propaganda design. After the war, psychologists found an expanding range of jobs outside of the academy. Since 1970, the number of college graduates with degrees in psychology has more than doubled, from 33,679 to 76,671 in 2002. The annual numbers of masters' and PhD degrees have also increased dramatically over the same period. All the while, degrees in the related fields of economics, sociology, and political science have remained constant.

Professional organizations have organized special events and meetings to promote the idea of applied psychology. In 1990, the American Psychological Society held a Behavioral Science Summit and formed the "Human Capital Initiative", spanning schools, workplace productivity, drugs, violence, and community health. The American Psychological Association declared 2000–2010 the Decade of Behavior, with a similarly broad scope. Psychological methods are considered applicable to all aspects of human life and society.

== Uses ==
There are many uses of applied psychology and can be found as a subfield in other genres of psychology. Applied Psychology has been used in teaching psychology because it focuses on the scientific findings and how it can be used to transfer that behavior. Many people who use applied psychology work in the fields of teaching, industrial, clinical, and consulting work areas. The Encyclopedia of Applied Psychology delves deeper into the many subsections that are used in correlation with this field and further explains the procedures that should be used in each of the respective industries.

== Advertising ==
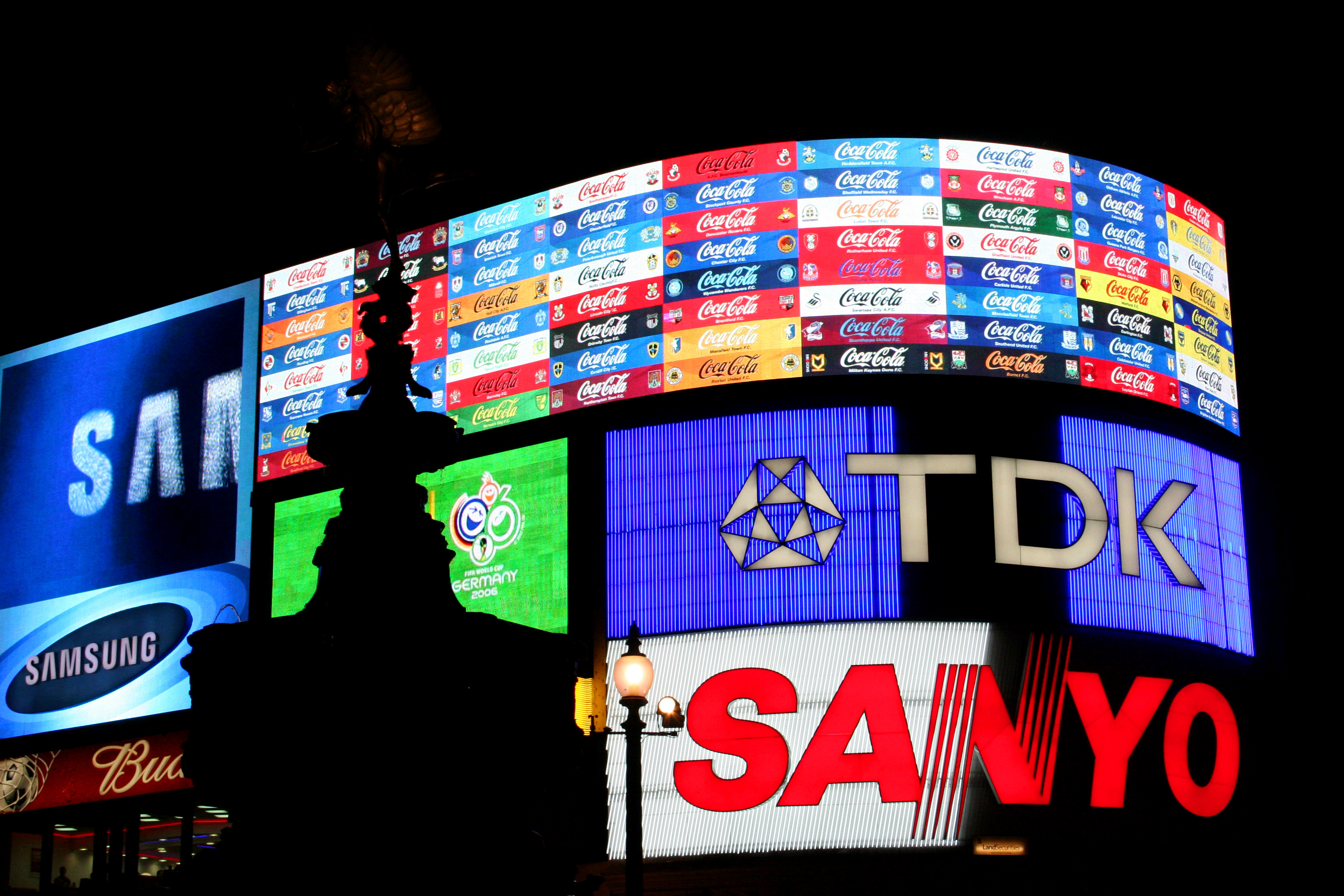
Digital advertisements shown at Picadilly Circus, London at night

Business advertisers have long consulted psychologists in assessing what types of messages will most effectively induce a person to buy a particular product. The three main types of psychologists that participate in creating advertisements are cognitive, media, and social psychologists. These psychologists often work together to create advertisements that create an emotional impact on the viewer in order to make the advertisement more memorable. Using the psychological research methods and the findings in human's cognition, motivation, attitudes and decision making, those can help to design more persuasive advertisement. Their research includes the study of unconscious influences and brand loyalty. However, the effect of unconscious influences was controversial. The use of these psychologists often create successful advertisements with the scientific methods that are used to portray violence, humor and sex.

== Educational ==
Educational psychology is devoted to the study of how humans learn in educational settings, especially schools. Psychologists assess the effects of specific educational interventions: e.g., phonics versus whole language instruction in early reading attainment. They also study the question of why learning occurs differently in different situations.

Another domain of educational psychology is the psychology of teaching. In some colleges, educational psychology courses are called "the psychology of learning and teaching". Educational psychology derives a great deal from basic-science disciplines within psychology including cognitive science and behaviorially-oriented research on learning.

== Counseling ==
Counseling psychology is an applied specialization within psychology, that involves both research and practice in a number of different areas or domains. According to Gelso and Fretz (2001), there are some central unifying themes among counseling psychologists. These include a focus on an individual's strengths, relationships, their educational and career development, as well as a focus on normal personalities. Counseling psychologists help people improve their well-being, reduce and manage stress, and improve overall functioning in their lives. The interventions used by Counseling Psychologists may be either brief or long-term in duration. Often they are problem focused and goal-directed. There is a guiding philosophy which places a value on individual differences and an emphasis on "prevention, development, and adjustment across the life-span." The use of applied psychology in counseling is one of the most useful when it comes to the treatment of individuals. The use of knowledge from scientific findings are beneficial because there are many different options that can be tested to find the right treatment.

== Medical and clinical ==
=== Medical psychology ===
Medical psychology involves the application of a range of psychological principles, theories and findings applied to the effective management of physical and mental disorders to improve the psychological and physical health of the patient. The American Psychological Association defines medical psychology as the branch of psychology that integrates somatic and psychotherapeutic modalities, into the management of mental illness, health rehabilitation and emotional, cognitive, behavioural and substance use disorders. According to Muse and Moore (2012), the medical psychologist's contributions in the areas of psychopharmacology which sets it apart from other of psychotherapy and psychotherapists.

=== Clinical psychology ===
Clinical psychology includes the study and application of psychology for the purpose of understanding, preventing, and relieving psychologically-based distress or dysfunction and to promote subjective well-being and personal development. Central to its practice are psychological assessment and psychotherapy, although clinical psychologists may also engage in research, teaching, consultation, forensic testimony, and program development and administration. Some clinical psychologists may focus on the clinical management of patients with brain injury—this area is known as clinical neuropsychology. In many countries clinical psychology is a regulated mental health profession.

The work performed by clinical psychologists tends to be done inside various therapy models, all of which involve a formal relationship between professional and client—usually an individual, couple, family, or small group—that employs a set of procedures intended to form a therapeutic alliance, explore the nature of psychological problems, and encourage new ways of thinking, feeling, or behaving. The four major perspectives are psychodynamic, cognitive behavioral, existential-humanistic, and systems or family therapy. There has been a growing movement to integrate these various therapeutic approaches, especially with an increased understanding of issues regarding ethnicity, gender, spirituality, and sexual-orientation. With the advent of more robust research findings regarding psychotherapy, there is growing evidence that most of the major therapies are about of equal effectiveness, with the key common element being a strong therapeutic alliance. Because of this, more training programs and psychologists are now adopting an eclectic therapeutic orientation.

Clinical psychologists do not usually prescribe medication, although there is a growing number of psychologists who do have prescribing privileges, in the field of medical psychology. In general, however, when medication is warranted many psychologists will work in cooperation with psychiatrists so that clients get therapeutic needs met. Clinical psychologists may also work as part of a team with other professionals, such as social workers and nutritionists.

== Environmental ==
Environmental psychology is the psychological study of humans and their interactions with their environments. The types of environments studied are limitless, ranging from homes, offices, classrooms, factories, nature, and so on. However, across these different environments, there are several common themes of study that emerge within each one. Noise level and ambient temperature are clearly present in all environments and often subjects of discussion for environmental psychologists. Crowding and stressors are a few other aspects of environments studied by this sub-discipline of psychology. When examining a particular environment, environmental psychology looks at the goals and purposes of the people in the using the environment, and tries to determine how well the environment is suiting the needs of the people using it. For example, a quiet environment is necessary for a classroom of students taking a test, but would not be needed or expected on a farm full of animals. The concepts and trends learned through environmental psychology can be used when setting up or rearranging spaces so that the space will best perform its intended function. The top common, more well known areas of psychology that drive this applied field include: cognitive, perception, learning, and social psychology.

== Forensic, legal and criminal ==
Forensic psychology and legal psychology are the areas concerned with the application of psychological methods and principles to legal questions and issues. Most typically, forensic psychology involves a clinical analysis of a particular individual and an assessment of some specific psycho-legal question. The psycho-legal question does not have to be criminal in nature. Forensic psychologists rarely get involved in the actual criminal investigations, which falls under a broader category of applied psychology called criminal psychology. Custody cases are an example of non-criminal evaluations by forensic psychologists. The validity and upholding of eyewitness testimony is an area of forensic psychology that does veer closer to criminal investigations, though does not directly involve the psychologist in the investigation process. Psychologists are often called to testify as expert witnesses on issues such as the accuracy of memory, the reliability of police interrogation, and the appropriate course of action in child custody cases.

Legal psychology refers to any application of psychological principles, methods or understanding to legal questions or issues. In addition to the applied practices, legal psychology also includes academic or empirical research on topics involving the relationship of law to human mental processes and behavior. However, inherent differences that arise when placing psychology in the legal context. Psychology rarely makes absolute statements. Instead, psychologists traffic in the terms like level of confidence, percentages, and significance. Legal matters, on the other hand, look for absolutes: guilty or not guilty. This makes for a sticky union between psychology and the legal system. Some universities operate dual JD/PhD programs focusing on the intersection of these two areas.

The Committee on Legal Issues of the American Psychological Association is known to file amicus curae briefs, as applications of psychological knowledge to high-profile court cases.

A related field, police psychology, involves consultation with police departments and participation in police training.

== Health and medicine ==
Health psychology concerns itself with understanding how biology, behavior, and social context influence health and illness. Health psychologists generally work alongside other medical professionals in clinical settings, although many also teach and conduct research. Although its early beginnings can be traced to the kindred field of clinical psychology, four different approaches to health psychology have been defined: clinical, public health, community and critical health psychology.

Health psychologists aim to change health behaviors for the dual purpose of helping people stay healthy and helping patients adhere to disease treatment regimens. The focus of health psychologists tend to center on the health crisis facing the western world particularly in the US. Cognitive behavioral therapy and behavior modification are techniques often employed by health psychologists. Psychologists also study patients' compliance with their doctors' orders.

Health psychologists view a person's mental condition as heavily related to their physical condition. An important concept in this field is stress, a mental phenomenon with well-known consequences for physical health.

=== Occupational health psychology ===
Occupational health psychology (OHP) is a relatively new discipline that emerged from the confluence of health psychology, industrial and organizational psychology, and occupational health. OHP has its own journals and professional organizations. The field is concerned with identifying psychosocial characteristics of workplaces that give rise to health-related problems in people who work. These problems can involve physical health (e.g., cardiovascular disease) or mental health (e.g., depression). Examples of psychosocial characteristics of workplaces that OHP has investigated include amount of decision latitude a worker can exercise and the supportiveness of supervisors. OHP is also concerned with the development and implementation of interventions that can prevent or ameliorate work-related health problems. In addition, OHP research has important implications for the economic success of organizations. Other research areas of concern to OHP include workplace incivility and violence, work-home carryover, unemployment and downsizing, and workplace safety and accident prevention. Two important OHP journals are the Journal of Occupational Health Psychology and Work & Stress. Three important organizations closely associated with OHP are the International Commission on Occupational Health's Scientific Committee on Work Organisation and Psychosocial Factors (ICOH-WOPS), the Society for Occupational Health Psychology, and the European Academy of Occupational Health Psychology.

== Human factors and ergonomics ==
Human factors and ergonomics is the study of how cognitive and psychological processes affect our interaction with tools, machines, and objects in the environment. Many branches of psychology attempt to create models of and understand human behavior. These models are usually based on data collected from experiments. Human Factor psychologists however, take the same data and use it to design or adapt processes and objects that will complement the human component of the equation. Rather than humans learning how to use and manipulate a piece of technology, human factors strives to design technology to be inline with the human behavior models designed by general psychology. This could be accounting for physical limitations of humans, as in ergonomics, or designing systems, especially computer systems, that work intuitively with humans, as does engineering psychology.

Ergonomics is applied primarily through office work and the transportation industry. Psychologists here take into account the physical limitations of the human body and attempt to reduce fatigue and stress by designing products and systems that work within the natural limitations of the human body. From simple things like the size of buttons and design of office chairs to layout of airplane cockpits, human factor psychologists, specializing in ergonomics, attempt to de-stress our everyday lives and sometimes even save them.

Human factor psychologists specializing in engineering psychology tend to take on slightly different projects than their ergonomic centered counterparts. These psychologists look at how a human and a process interact. Often engineering psychology may be centered on computers. However at the base level, a process is simply a series of inputs and outputs between a human and a machine. The human must have a clear method to input data and be able to easily access the information in output. The inability of rapid and accurate corrections can sometimes lead to drastic consequences, as summed up by many stories in Set Phasers on Stun. The engineering psychologists wants to make the process of inputs and outputs as intuitive as possible for the user.

The goal of research in human factors is to understand the limitations and biases of human mental processes and behavior, and design items and systems that will interact accordingly with the limitations. Some may see human factors as intuitive or a list of dos and don'ts, but in reality, human factor research strives to make sense of large piles of data to bring precise applications to product designs and systems to help people work more naturally, intuitively with the items of their surroundings.

== Industrial and organizational ==
Industrial and organizational psychology, or I-O psychology, focuses on the psychology of work. Relevant topics within I-O psychology include the psychology of recruitment, selecting employees from an applicant pool, training, performance appraisal, job satisfaction, work motivation. work behavior, occupational stress, accident prevention, occupational safety and health, management, retirement planning and unemployment among many other issues related to the workplace and people's work lives. In short, I-O psychology is the application of psychology to the workplace. One aspect of this field is job analysis, the detailed study of which behaviors a given job entails.

Though the name of the title "Industrial Organizational Psychology" implies 2 split disciplines being chained together, it is near impossible to have one half without the other. If asked to generally define the differences, Industrial psychology focuses more on the Human Resources aspects of the field, and Organizational psychology focuses more on the personal interactions of the employees. When applying these principles however, they are not easily broken apart. For example, when developing requirements for a new job position, the recruiters are looking for an applicant with strong communication skills in multiple areas. The developing of the position requirements falls under the industrial psychology, human resource type work, and the requirement of communication skills is related to how the employee with interacts with co-workers. As seen here, it is hard to separate task of developing a qualifications list from the types of qualifications on the list. This is parallel to how the I and O are nearly inseparable in practice. Therefore, I-O psychologists are generally rounded in both industrial and organizational psychology though they will have some specialization. Other topics of interest for I-O psychologists include leadership, performance evaluation, training, and much more.

Military psychology includes research into the classification, training, and performance of soldiers.

== School ==
School psychology is a field that applies principles of clinical psychology and educational psychology to the diagnosis and treatment of students' behavioral and learning problems. School psychologists are educated in child and adolescent development, learning theories, psychological and psycho-educational assessment, personality theories, therapeutic interventions, special education, psychology, consultation, child and adolescent psychopathology, and the ethical, legal and administrative codes of their profession.

According to Division 16 (Division of School Psychology) of the American Psychological Association (APA), school psychologists operate according to a scientific framework. They work to promote effectiveness and efficiency in the field. School psychologists conduct psychological assessments, provide brief interventions, and develop or help develop prevention programs. Additionally, they evaluate services with special focus on developmental processes of children within the school system, and other systems, such as families. School psychologists consult with teachers, parents, and school personnel about learning, behavioral, social, and emotional problems. They may teach lessons on parenting skills (like school counselors), learning strategies, and other skills related to school mental health. In addition, they explain test results to parents and students. They provide individual, group, and in some cases family counseling (State Board of Education 2003; National Clearinghouse for Professions in Special Education, n.d.). School psychologists are actively involved in district and school crisis intervention teams. They also supervise graduate students in school psychology. School psychologists in many districts provide professional development to teachers and other school personnel on topics such as positive behavior intervention plans and achievement tests.

One application of school psychology is addressing the challenges associated with culturally diverse classrooms. School psychologists can help educators understand how cultural differences, including distinctions between individualistic and collectivistic cultures, may influence students' learning experiences, social interactions, and educational needs.

School psychologists are influential within the school system and are frequently consulted to solve problems. Practitioners should be able to provide consultation and collaborate with other members of the educational community and confidently make decisions based on empirical research.

== Social change ==
Psychologists have been employed to promote "green" behavior, i.e. sustainable development. In this case, their goal is behavior modification, through strategies such as social marketing. Tactics include education, disseminating information, organizing social movements, passing laws, and altering taxes to influence decisions.

Psychology has been applied on a world scale with the aim of population control. For example, one strategy towards television programming combines social models in a soap opera with informational messages during advertising time. This strategy successfully increased women's enrollment at family planning clinics in Mexico. The programming—which has been deployed around the world by Population Communications International and the Population Media Center—combines family planning messages with representations of female education and literacy.

== Sport psychology ==
Sport psychology is a specialization within psychology that seeks to understand psychological/mental factors that affect performance in sports, physical activity and exercise and apply these to enhance individual and team performance. The sport psychology approach differs from the coaches and players perspective. Coaches tend to narrow their focus and energy towards the end-goal. They are concerned with the actions that lead to the win, as opposed to the sport psychologist who tries to focus the players thoughts on just achieving the win. Sport psychology trains players mentally to prepare them, whereas coaches tend to focus mostly on physical training. Sport psychology deals with increasing performance by managing emotions and minimizing the psychological effects of injury and poor performance. Some of the most important skills taught are goal setting, relaxation, visualization, self-talk awareness and control, concentration, using rituals, attribution training, and periodization. The principles and theories may be applied to any human movement or performance tasks (e.g., playing a musical instrument, acting in a play, public speaking, motor skills). Usually, experts recommend that students be trained in both kinesiology (i.e., sport and exercise sciences, physical education) and counseling.

== Traffic psychology ==
Traffic psychology is an applied discipline within psychology that looks at the relationship between psychological processes and cognitions and the actual behavior of road users. In general, traffic psychologists attempt to apply these principles and research findings, in order to provide solutions to problems such as traffic mobility and congestion, road accidents, speeding. Research psychologists also are involved with the education and the motivation of road users.

== Additional areas ==
- Community psychology
- Ecological psychology
- Media psychology
- Operational psychology
- Peace psychology
- Fashion psychology

== See also ==
- Linguistics
- Neuroscience
- Social work
- Outline of psychology
