= Matt Cartmill =

American anthropologist

- Born: Matthew Cartmill; January 4, 1943 (age 83); Los Angeles, California
- Known for: Work on evolution of behavior and anatomy humans and other primates
- Spouse: Kaye Brown (m. 1971)
- Awards: Charles R. Darwin Lifetime Achievement Award from the American Association of Physical Anthropologists (2019)
- Scientific career
- Fields: Biological anthropology Cultural anthropology
- Institutions: Duke University; Boston University
- Thesis: The Orbits of Arboreal Mammals: A Reassessment of the Arboreal Theory of Primate Evolution (1970)

Matthew Cartmill is an American anthropologist and professor of anthropology in the College of Arts and Sciences at Boston University, where he formerly served as Chair of Anthropology.

== Education and career ==
Cartmill was educated at Pomona College and the University of Chicago. He joined the faculty of Duke University in 1970, eventually becoming Professor Emeritus of Evolutionary Anthropology there. He left Duke to join the faculty of Boston University in 2008. He was a founding editor of the International Journal of Primatology from 1978 to 1989, editor-in-chief of the American Journal of Physical Anthropology from 1989 to 1995, and served as president of the American Association of Physical Anthropologists from 1997 to 1999. He also served as the senior associate editor for the International Encyclopedia of Biological Anthropology.

== Honors and awards ==
Cartmill was elected a fellow of the American Association for the Advancement of Science in 1983 and received a Guggenheim Fellowship in 1985. His 1993 book A View to a Death in the Morning received both the W. W. Howells Award from the American Anthropological Association and the George Perkins Marsh Book Award from the American Society for Environmental History. In 2019, he received the Charles R. Darwin Lifetime Achievement Award from the American Association of Physical Anthropologists.

== Personal life ==
Cartmill is the son of science fiction author Cleve Cartmill. He was born on January 4, 1943, in Los Angeles, California. He has been married to Kaye Brown since May 29, 1971.
