= Roger Barker =

American psychologist

Roger G. Barker
- Born: 1903; Macksburg, Iowa
- Died: 1990 (aged 86–87); Oskaloosa, Kansas
- Spouse: Louise Shedd Barker

Academic background
- Education: Stanford University
- Thesis: The Relation of Age of Human Adults to Some Aspects of the Ability to Do Fatiguing Muscular Work (1934)
- Doctoral advisor: Walter Richard Miles

Academic work
- Discipline: Psychology
- Institutions: University of Kansas

Roger Garlock Barker (1903 – 1990) was a social scientist, a founder of environmental psychology, and a leading figure in the field for decades. He is best known for developing behavior settings and staffing theory. He was also a central figure in developing ecological and rehabilitation psychology.

Barker earned his Ph.D. from Stanford University, where his advisor was Walter Richard Miles. In the 1940s, Barker and his associate, Herbert Wright from the University of Kansas in Lawrence, set up the Midwest Psychological Field Station in nearby Oskaloosa, Kansas, a town of fewer than 2,000 people. Barker's team gathered empirical data in Oskaloosa from 1947 to 1972, disguising the town as "Midwest, Kansas" for publications like One Boy's Day (1952) and Midwest and Its Children (1955). Based on the data collected there, Barker first developed the concept of the behavior setting to help explain the interplay between the individual and the immediate environment.

One of his work's most valuable developments was examining how the number and variety of behavior settings remain remarkably constant even as institutions increase in size. His seminal work with Paul Gump, Big School Small School (Stanford: Stanford University Press, 1964) explored this. They showed that large schools had a similar number of behavior settings to small schools. A consequence was that students could take many different roles in small schools (e.g., in the school band and the school football team), while there was a greater tendency to be selective in larger schools.

Val Curtis developed and used his concept of behavior settings since it allows predicting individual behavior from the setting in which people find themselves.

Barker died at his home in Oskaloosa in September 1990. He was survived by his wife, Louise Shedd Barker, with whom he collaborated on much of his research.

Barker is the subject of a 2014 biography, The Outsider: The Life and Times of Roger Barker, by American journalist Ariel Sabar.

== See also ==
- Rehabilitation psychology
