= Ecological unit =

Ecological units refer to specific levels or degrees of organization within ecological systems. The units that are most commonly used and discussed within ecological systems are those at the levels of individuals, populations, communities, and ecosystems. These terms help distinguish between very specific, localized interactions, such as those occurring at the individual or population level, and broader, more complex interactions that occur at the community and ecosystem levels, providing a framework for understanding ecological structure and processes at different scales.

These ecological units are foundational to the field of ecology as they define and identify the key components and relationships within ecological systems at the different levels—providing cohesion in conversation and research. Additionally, these terms and the concept of ecological units as a whole are intertwined in ecological theory, understanding biodiversity, conservation strategies, and more. However, these ecological units have been met with some disagreements over the inconsistencies in the exact terminology and its uses. Arguments over stem from conflicting views from four different areas:

1. Whether the units are defined statistically or via a network of interactions: Statistical definitions would mean that the ecological units are measured using measurable parameters, based on statistical values and criteria. A network of interactions entails that ecological units are defined by the relationships and dynamics between the organisms and environment.
2. Whether boundaries are drawn by topographical or process-related criteria: Topographical criteria means that the ecological boundaries are based on the physical and geographical features in the surroundings. Process-related criteria would focus on the ecological processes and interactions that occur at the level.
3. How high the required internal relationships are: This refers to the degree of intensity and complexity of the interactions and interconnectedness of the ecological unit.
4. Whether the ecological unit is perceived as a "real" entity or an abstraction by an observer: This argument debates if an ecological unit, despite having a name and loose definition, whether it is simply a measure for conceptual thought that helps in modeling, or whether it is definitive and seen as a concrete thing.

== Summary ==
=== Individual ===
The most basic ecological unit is at the individual level. At this level, singular organisms in a single species are the focus of reference. Studying individuals can help reinforce concepts in their physiology and behavior. Additionally, single individuals can be outliers in many ways, such as genetic variation, which can lead to questions about what triggered this change and to see whether it spreads to the remainder of the population. It can be argued that studying individuals is insignificant and no concrete conclusions can be drawn about entire populations based on one individual. Regardless of this remark, individuals can still provide valuable insights into the broader dynamics of a species, as they offer a starting point for understanding the underlying processes of adaptation, survival, and reproduction.

=== Population ===
The next level is populations—this refers to all individuals in a single species. Studying populations is crucial for understanding interactions within a species, between species, and with the surrounding environment. It can also reveal similarities and differences between the same species in the same location or in different locations, helping to identify key variables that influence these variations. Changes within populations can often be attributed to some sort of survival pressure that is urging an evolutionary adaptation in order for the species to maintain itself. These pressures may include competition for resources, predation, climate changes, or disease outbreaks. By examining population dynamics, scientists can gain insights into how species adapt over time, predict future changes, and make informed decisions about conservation efforts or managing ecosystems.

=== Community ===
Community would follow population in terms of hierarchical largeness. Community would be the collective dynamics amongst species and the habitat in which they live in. Communities are most closely associated with habitats, which are more intimate than compared to ecosystems. Habitats signify a smaller, more specific region, while an ecosystem is a broader term that can encompass multiple habitats. An example of this could be that of the marine ecosystem which can be an umbrella term for all organisms living in oceanic conditions. However, a habitat in the Gulf of Maine varies widely from that of the Great Barrier Reef, despite both of them falling under the marine ecosystem term. This also means that the communities, the organisms that exist in these two different habitats, also differ.

=== Ecosystems ===
The last ecological unit is ecosystems. Ecosystems encompass the diverse and complex conditions of the Earth, including both biotic and abiotic components. They often differ in geographic locations with respect to their position relative to the equator, relationship to altitude in which the location resides, seasonal trends, etc. Some examples of ecosystems include marine/aquatic ecosystems, rainforests, tundras, savannas, etc. As mentioned above, not all habitats or communities within the same ecosystem are exactly the same, despite sharing the broader ecosystem classification. However, they do tend to share significant characteristics, such as similar climate conditions, predominant plant species, and types of interactions among organisms. These common features enable ecosystems to function cohesively, supporting particular ecological processes like nutrient cycling, energy flow, and species interactions, while still exhibiting unique variations across different regions and environmental contexts.
