= Austen Croom-Johnson =

English pianist (1909–1964)

Austen Herbert Croom-Johnson (20 October 1909 Hereford, England – 18 May 1964 Manhattan, New York City) was an English-born pianist, composer, and radio producer: first, until about 1935, for the BBC, then, from about 1936, for NBC. He went on to become a prolific jingle writer, first beginning around 1938 in radio with his chief collaborator, Alan Kent, then, beginning around 1947, in television. Croom-Johnson and Kent are widely credited for being the fathers of the modern short jingle.

== Career ==
Austen Herbert Croom-Johnson – nicknamed "Bunny" and "Ginger" Croom-Johnson – was born in Hereford. His double surname, "Croom-Johnson," are the surnames of his paternal great-grandparents, Henry Johnson (c. 1795–18??) and Catherine Croom (c. 1795–1876). Austen moved to New York City in 1935. Before moving to New York City, he had worked for the British Broadcasting Company for many years as a producer and performer. One of the programs he created for the BBC, Soft Lights and Music, became very popular. While in England, he wrote themes for Billy Mayerl's "Green Tulips" and "Bats in the Belfry."

Croom-Johnson was enthusiastic about jazz, and in particular, English composer Frederick Delius (1862–1934).

In commercial music, Croom-Johnson imported the tune, "D'ye ken John Peel?," and scored it for a 1939 jingle, "Pepsi-Cola Hits the Spot" (a.k.a. "Nickel, Nickel"). His Chicago-born lyricist partner, Alan Bradley Kent (né Karl Dewitt Byington, Jr.; 1912–1991), wrote the words. Its first and most enduring recording was performed – jazz-swing style, uptempo – by the Tune Twisters, a male vocal jazz trio that, for the prior 5 years, had been enjoying popularity on non-jazz oriented broadcasts from New York City. Lord & Thomas, a bygone New York City advertising agency, had commissioned songwriters Johnson and Kent to develop the campaign; and Newell-Emmett, another bygone New York City advertising agency, managed it for Pepsi-Cola. The jingle is the first in several respects. It is the first to become a hit, as popular music, on network radio, coast to coast – owed in part to the catchiness of the tune. It proved so popular that, in some cases, radio stations played it as entertainment rather than as advertising. It also is the first jingle with a short run-time, an innovation that changed broadcast advertising. In an era when advertisements ran often 5 minutes and employed annoyance factors, "Pepsi-Cola Hits the Spot" was the first to run slightly under 15 seconds, which permitted many more repetitions. The jingle, in 1999, was ranked by AdAge's "Top 100 Advertising Campaigns" as the No. 1 jingle of the 1940s and No. 14 of all time.

== Education ==
- King's School, Bruton, graduate
- Oxford University, student for two years
- Royal College of Music, graduate; he studied with Ralph Vaughan Williams, there

== Selected works ==
Early works

- "After The Sun Kissed The World Goodbye" (1920)

A.H. Croom-Johnson (w&m)

- "Thank You for the Flowers" (1932)

Austen Croom Johnson (w&m)

Up until 1935 in England with Billy Mayerl

- "Green Tulips," a syncopated impression (1935)

By Billy Mayerl
On a theme by Austin Croom-Johnson
Keith Prowse & Co.
OCLC 810625810

- "Why Couldn't It Last – Last Night?" (1939)

Nick Kenny & Charles Kenny (words)
Austen Croom Johnson (music)

From 1938 to 1947 with Alan (a.k.a. Allan) Kent

- "Junk Ain't Junk No More – 'Cause Junk Will Win the War" (1943)

Austen Croom Johnson (music)
Allan Kent (words)
OCLC 497906558

After 1946 with Redd Evans

- "Just the Other Day" (1946)

Austen Croom Johnson (music)
Redd Evans (1912–1972) (words)
Shapiro, Bernstein & Co.
OCLC 61727699

- "Just The Other Day" (1946)

Austen Croom Johnson (music)
Redd Evans (1912–1972) (words)

- "There's No One But You" (1946)

Austen Croom Johnson (music)
Redd Evans (1912–1972) (words)
Shapiro, Bernstein & Co.
OCLC 739098312

- "Just For Old Times" (1950)

Joseph Allan McCarthy (1922–1975) (words)
A.H. Croom-Johnson (music)

- "Sweetmeat Joe, the Candy Man"

Austen Croom Johnson (w&m)

== Selected discography ==
- Nan Blakstone (de) (née Naomi Marie Ewald; 1902–1951), vocalist

Ginger Croom-Johnson, piano
Recorded 11 May 1933, London
Side A; CE6068-1: "You're Getting To Be A Habit With Me"

Al Dubin (words)
Harry Warren (music)

Side B; CE6069-1: "I'll Putcher Pitcha in the Paper"

From the 1931 Broadway musical, The Third Little Show, at the Music Box Theatre
Maxwell Lief (1899–1969) and Nathaniel B. Lief (1893–1944) (words)
Michael H. Cleary (1902–1954) (music)

Parlophone R1536 (78 rpm)

- "Why Couldn't It Last?" ("Last Night")

Recorded 15 September 1939
Kenny Baker (1912–1985), vocalist
Nathaniel Finston (né Nathaniel William Finkelstein; 1890–1979), orchestra director, brother-in-law of composer Nathaniel Shilkret (1889–1982)
Victor PBS-042122

- ("Why Couldn't It Last") "Last Night"

Joe Venuti Orchestra
(theme song of Venuti's orchestra)
Recorded 1939

== Family ==
=== Marriages ===
Johnson was married at least five times.

1. First, on 4 September 1935, in Manhattan to Marthe L. Lamquet (maiden; born 1916).
2. Second, on 17 October 1938, in Birmingham, Alabama, to singer Loulie Jean Norman (maiden; 1913–2005), her first of two marriages. They divorced sometime before May 1942. Loulie was, from 1970 to 1973, the mother-in-law of Little Feat rock singer Lowell George (1945–1979) and from 1968, mother-in-law of Little Feat musician Richie Hayward (1946–2010).
3. Third, on 24 December 1943, in Manhattan to Joan Ashton Lindsley (maiden; 1913–1971), her third of four marriages. They divorced in 1947.
4. Fourth, on 21 November 1949, in Baltimore to Peggy Sullivan (maiden; 1925–2001), and
5. Fifth to Winifred Maureen McMahon (maiden; born 1916 – died April 10, 2020, age 103)

== Aliases ==
- Austen Herbert C. Croom-Johnson
- Bunny Croom-Johnson
- Ginger Johnson
- Joe Cobb
