= James Loomis Madden =

James Loomis Madden (1892 – 1972) was acting chancellor of New York University from 1951 to 1952.

Academic offices
Preceded by Harry Woodburn Chase	Chancellor of New York University; 1951–1952	Succeeded by Henry Townley Heald
