= John Sexton =

American lawyer and academic

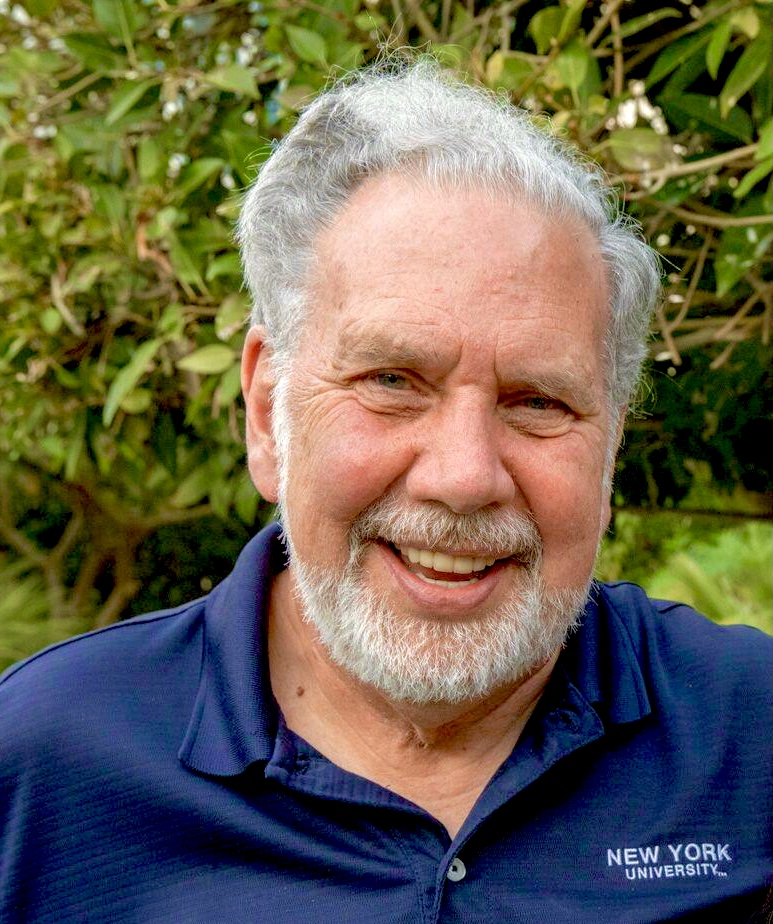
- Sexton in 2021

15th President of New York University
- In office May 17, 2002 – December 31, 2015
- Preceded by: L. Jay Oliva
- Succeeded by: Andrew D. Hamilton

Dean of New York University School of Law
- In office 1988–2002
- Preceded by: Norman Redlich
- Succeeded by: Richard Revesz

Personal details
- Born: John Edward Sexton; September 29, 1942 (age 84) New York City, New York, U.S.
- Education: Fordham University (BA, MA, PhD); Harvard University (JD)

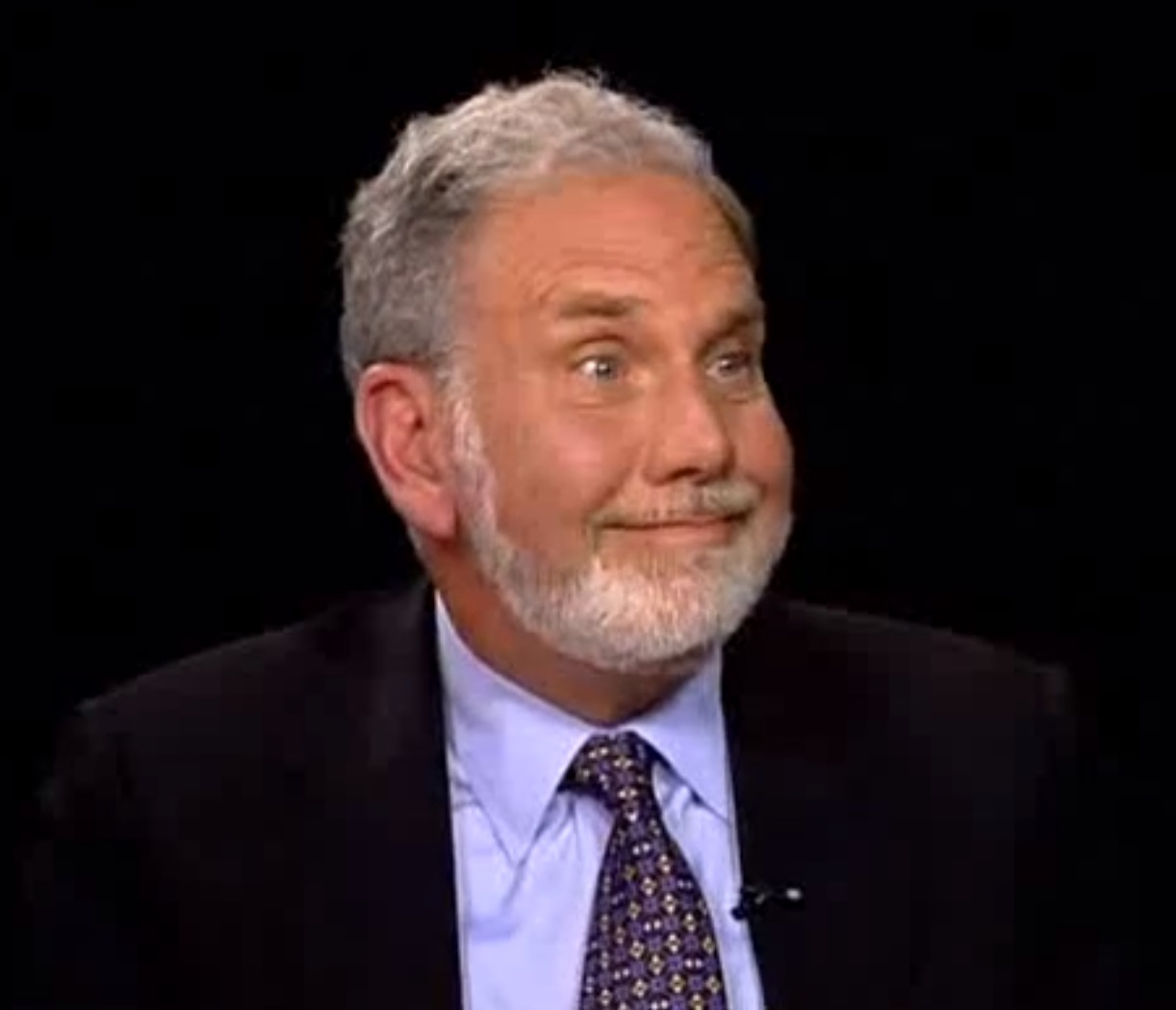
Sexton in 2010

John Edward Sexton (born September 29, 1942) is an American legal scholar. He is the Benjamin F. Butler Professor of Law at New York University where he teaches at the law school and NYU's undergraduate colleges. Sexton served as the fifteenth president of NYU, from 2002 to 2015. During his time as president, NYU's stature rose into the ranks of the world's top universities, and it became the world's first global network university. Sexton has been called a "transformational" figure in higher education and was named by Time Magazine as one of the United States' 10 best college presidents in 2009.

From 1988 to 2002, he served as dean of the NYU School of Law, during which time NYU became one of the top five law schools in the country according to U.S. News & World Report. Sexton has also served as chair of several major higher education organizations, including the Association of American Law Schools, the American Council on Education, the Independent Colleges and Universities of New York State, the New York Academy of Sciences, and the University of the People President's Council. He is a member of the American Academy of Arts and Sciences and has received awards and honors for his work in education, including the American Council on Education's Theodore M. Hesburgh Award for Leadership Excellence and 26 honorary doctoral degrees. In July 2008, he was named as Chevalier de la Légion d'Honneur, the national order of the Legion of Honor of France; and in April 2024, Sexton received the Abu Dhabi Award, which is the highest civilian honor issued by the United Arab Emirates. From January 1, 2003, to January 1, 2007, Sexton was the Chairman of the Board of the Federal Reserve Bank of New York; in 2006, he served as chair of the Federal Reserve System's Council of Chairs.

== Education and early career ==
Sexton graduated from Brooklyn Preparatory School, a Jesuit high school, in 1959.

Sexton holds a B.A. in history (1963), a M.A. in comparative religion (1965), and a Ph.D. in history of American religion (1978) from Fordham University, as well as a J.D. (1979) magna cum laude from Harvard Law School, where he was Supreme Court Editor of the Harvard Law Review.

From 1966 to 1975, he taught religion at St. Francis College in Brooklyn, New York, where he was chair of the Religion Department. In 1977, he incorporated the John Sexton Test Preparation Center in the New York City area, which offered test preparation services for exams such as the GMAT and LSAT. According to a government report, it served 6,500 students and had revenue of over $650,000 in 1979.

From 1961 to 1975, Sexton coached the debate team at St. Brendan's High School, a Catholic girls' school in Brooklyn, New York, leading the team to five national championships. He was named to the National Forensic League Hall of Fame in 2003. In 2005, the Barkley Forum at Emory University presented him with a Golden Anniversary Coaching Award recognizing him as a top high school debate coach of the past 50 years. Sexton is Chairman of the Board of Associated Leaders of Urban Debate (ALOUD), which seeks to bring debate activities to underserved communities in America's urban areas.

After graduating from Harvard Law School, he clerked for judges Harold Leventhal and David L. Bazelon of the United States Court of Appeals for the District of Columbia Circuit in 1979–80, and he clerked for Chief Justice of the United States Warren E. Burger in 1980–81.

== Dean of New York University School of Law ==
Sexton joined the faculty of the New York University School of Law in 1981, teaching first year law students Civil Procedure (the rules of courts); he was given tenure in 1983.

In 1988, Sexton was named dean of the New York University School of Law, succeeding Norman Redlich. During his deanship, NYU's School of Law rose to number four in the U.S. News & World Report rankings of law schools; an emphasis on faculty recruitment reduced the student faculty ratio from 19:1 to 12:1; the Hauser Global Law School Program was established; the school became among the most selective in the U.S. (average LSAT scores rose from the 94th to the 97th percentile; average GPAs rose from 3.54 to 3.66); and in 1998 the school completed the then-largest fundraising campaign in the history of legal education ($185 million). After he stepped down as dean to become president of NYU in 2002, the law school named a professorship after him, the John E. Sexton Professor of Law, held presently by Oren Bar-Gill, as well as named a lounge after him at Furman Hall, the John Sexton Student Forum. In addition, the law school as created a set of scholarships for students named in his honor.

== President of New York University ==
Sexton was named the 15th president of New York University by NYU's Board of Trustees on May 8, 2001, two months after then-president L. Jay Oliva announced that he was stepping down. He assumed the post of president on May 17, 2002, one day after the 2002 All-University Commencement, and his official installation occurred on September 26, 2002. In 2009, NYU's Board of Trustees asked him to stay on as president until 2016, and Sexton accepted.

In addition to his duties as NYU President, Sexton has taught a full faculty schedule — at least four courses — every year since 1981 without sabbatical. He teaches both law students and undergraduates across NYU's Global Network in New York and Abu Dhabi and has taught classes in Shanghai. A book based on one of the courses, Baseball as a Road to God, was published in 2013. He also taught a year-long course on the American Constitution, religion, and government for the Sheikh Mohammed bin Zayed Al Nahyan Scholars Program for outstanding undergraduate students in United Arab Emirates' institutions of higher learning.

During his presidency, NYU was named the "number one dream school" four times by The Princeton Review. In addition, NYU rose across college rankings, including in US News & World Report, the Times Higher Education, the Financial Times, and Bloomberg BusinessWeek. In 2014, NYU received a record number of prospective applicants for freshman admission for the seventh straight year in a row.

=== Expansion of the Arts and Science faculty ===
In 2004, Sexton announced a program — the Partners Plan — to expand tenured and tenure-track faculty in the arts and sciences by 20%, the largest such expansion in the university's history. By fall 2009, faculty hires under the Partners Plan included totaled 245, including 124 hires to replace departing faculty and 121 new hires to expand the arts and science faculty.

=== Fundraising campaign ===
In 2008, NYU successfully finished what was then the largest completed fundraising campaign in higher education. The Campaign for NYU, with a stated goal of raising $2.5 billion, ultimately raised over $3 billion. In 2009, NYU's fundraising continued to exceed $1 million per day in spite of the economic crisis.

=== The Global Network University ===
In October 2007, NYU announced the creation of New York University Abu Dhabi, the first such campus to be operated abroad by a major research university. The school, which the university is referring to as the "world's honors college," recruits top students and faculty from around the world, and began classes in the fall of 2010. Sexton discussed the idea of the Global Network University at length in late 2009 with Richard Heffner on The Open Mind (TV series). "The New Global University" was a topic of the British Council's Going Global conference in March 2010, at which Sexton was invited to speak.

On March 28, 2011, under Sexton, the university announced the creation of New York University Shanghai, a research university with a liberal arts and science college and the first American university with independent legal status approved by the Chinese Ministry of Education. Also in March 2011, NAFSA: Association of International Educators recognized NYU with its Senator Paul Simon Award for Campus Internationalization, and Fast Company (magazine) named NYU #1 on its list of education innovators, citing the opening of NYU Abu Dhabi. The following month Secretary of State Hillary Clinton cited NYU's announcement about the opening of NYU Shanghai and praised John Sexton's work on the project when she spoke at the U.S. State Department's US-China Consultation on People-to-People Exchange.

On July 11, 2011, in response to the detention of law-abiding democracy advocates by the government of the United Arab Emirates and Sexton's suggestion that such detention was appropriate to the UAE's "security concerns," Human Rights Watch asked Sexton to publicly retract his statements on the matter. He did not respond to this request.

=== Undergraduate programs ===
Both Sexton's own transition reports and the Middle States Accreditation Report cited the need to enhance the experience of NYU undergraduates. Since Sexton's appointment, NYU put in place the award-winning 24/7 Wellness Exchange, specialized programming in student dorms, and novel resources to assist students. In addition, NYU's Student Health Center has been a pioneer in depression screening among college students.

=== Leadership positions in major academic organizations and think tanks ===
While Dean of the NYU School of Law, Sexton served as president of the Association of American Law Schools. In 2009, Sexton served as chair of the Commission on Independent Colleges and Universities, vice-chair and chair-designate of the American Council on Education, and chair of the New York Academy of Sciences. He is also a member of the board of the Association of American Universities, a member of the board of the National Association of Independent Colleges and Universities, and a member of the board of the Institute of International Education.

Sexton is also a fellow of the American Academy of Arts and Sciences, a member of the Council on Foreign Relations and on the advisory board of the Genesis Prize Foundation. He is a fellow of the Foreign Policy Association.

In 2008–09, Sexton co-chaired (with Rick Trainor, the principal of King's College London) the US-UK Study Group on Higher Education in a Global Environment, a working group of university presidents constituted by British Prime Minister Gordon Brown.

In March 2010, Sexton was named Chair of the American Council on Education.

In 2011, Sexton led a blue ribbon panel assembled by the American Council on Education that issued a report on the competitiveness of U.S. universities and the global higher education environment.

=== Framework 2031 and NYU 2031 expansion plan ===
In 2002, Sexton's transition teams identified the need for improved and better coordinated planning.

In June 2008, NYU published Framework 2031, which reviewed and addressed the key issues, concerns, and opportunities the university would confront over the two-plus decades leading to its bicentennial.

Increases in the size of the student body and program development that began to accelerate in the 1990s sparked resistance in the Greenwich Village neighborhood, as community members opposed NYU's expansion projects. In 2007, NYU began a space planning process with intensive community involvement to provide a roadmap for aligning the university's academic needs and its growth through 2031; the process included a number of open houses to provide for community input. In April 2010, Sexton announced NYU 2031: NYU in NYC, a long-term, citywide strategic framework for how and where NYU should develop space for its academic mission. The strategy envisioned the addition of as much as 6,000,000 sq ft (560,000 m^{2}) of space over more than two decades, but recognized that all of NYU's space needs could not be accommodated within its neighborhood; therefore NYU 2031: NYU in NYC called for fully half of the growth to be spread over three locations outside Greenwich Village — along Manhattan's East Side health corridor, in Downtown Brooklyn, and on Governors Island — and half in or near its core.

In March 2011, NYU announced updates to its plans to expand over the coming two decades, and in particular its proposal for the two "superblocks" near its campus core. Following editorial support by New York City newspapers and the approval of the New York City Planning Commission, the New York City Council approved the NYU 2031 proposals in July 2012 by a vote of 44–1.

=== Opposition to and ultimate approval of NYU's 2031 plan ===
A faculty organization called "Faculty Against the Sexton Plan" was formed to fight the administration's plans, which had prompted contentious public meetings within the Greenwich Village community prior to the near-unanimous approval by the city. That group was one of a number of plaintiffs in a lawsuit against the university over the plan; in October 2014, the Appellate Division of the New York State Supreme Court ruled for NYU and the city and against the plaintiffs.

On March 15, 2013, Sexton lost a vote of no confidence among NYU Faculty of Arts and Science, by a vote of 52% to 39% with 8% abstaining; with a total of 83% voter participation. Subsequently, faculty of the Gallatin School, the Steinhardt School, and the Tisch School also passed votes of no confidence. However, the NYU Board of Trustees reaffirmed their support for Sexton; moreover, the faculty of the NYU School of Law passed a faculty vote of confidence in Sexton by 59-2 (with 3 abstentions), the Faculty Council at the School of Medicine passed a resolution of support for Sexton 28–9, and the School of Social Work voted down a motion of no confidence 20-12 (with 9 abstentions).

Some members of the faculty claimed that the administration of New York University, in seeking approvals for the NYU 2031 plan, would create a development project that would remove large tracts of open space from Greenwich Village and create a construction zone on and off for years to come. Out of 170 academic departments in the university, 37 passed resolutions against the NYU 2031 plan, including a majority of the departments in the Faculty of Arts and Science; in response, Sexton indicated in a University Senate meeting in spring 2012 that he would establish a presidential working group, composed largely of faculty selected by the Faculty Senators Council and the schools and chaired by the head of the Faculty Senators Council, to review space and development issues. That group, the University Space Priorities Working Group, began its work in fall 2012; it completed its work in March 2014. In its final report, the group found that NYU did indeed have a pressing need for additional academic space, determined that the university's plans for a new facility were within it financial means, and recommended that the university construct on the site of the Coles Sports and Recreation Center.

After receiving editorial support by New York City newspapers, including The New York Times, the New York Daily News, the New York Post, Crain's New York Business, and the New York Observer, and the approval of the New York City Planning Commission, the New York City Council overwhelmingly approved, by a margin of 44–1, the NYU 2031 proposals in July 2012.

=== Grad student labor dispute ===
In November 2013, NYU and the United Auto Workers (which represented graduate teaching assistants, or TAs) announced a joint agreement to recognize a graduate student union; in March 2015, the two sides reached agreement on a contract. In the preceding years, there was controversy at NYU over the issue of collective bargaining and union representation for TAs as well as research assistants (RAs). In 2001, NYU signed the first and only collective bargaining agreement for TAs at a private university. In July 2004, in a case involving Brown University, the National Labor Relations Board reversed its 2000 ruling involving NYU and determined that graduate students are not workers. In the spring and summer of 2005, there were discussions between NYU and the UAW to try to come to terms on a new contract. Ultimately, this proved unsuccessful, and NYU decided not to negotiate a second contract with the Graduate Student Organizing Committee, sparking a strike among graduate assistants in late 2005 and criticism of Sexton. GSOC called off the strike in 2006. In 2009, NYU's Graduate School of Arts & Science – home to most of NYU's fully funded graduate students — modified its financial aid packages for graduate students to eliminate assistantship duties; thereafter, graduate students who wished to teach could do so (with additional compensation beyond their graduate study stipends) as adjunct faculty, who are unionized at NYU.

=== Return to NYU School of Law ===
Sexton decided to retire as the university's president after his contract expired in 2016 after 14 years as president; he subsequently returned full-time to NYU School of Law, where he was previously dean for 14 years and a faculty member for seven years. He also continues to teach at the university's undergraduate colleges, as he did during his term as president.

=== Salary and compensation ===
In the 2007–08 school year, Sexton received $1.3 million in executive compensation for his service as president of the university. His salary later increased to $1.5 million. Sexton was scheduled to receive a length of service bonus of $2.5 million in 2015 as well as $800,000 annually in retirement.

== Writing ==
Sexton co-edits the textbook Civil Procedure: Cases and Materials, now in its thirteenth edition (with John Cound, Jack Friedenthal, Helen Hershkoff, and Arthur R. Miller), which is widely used in law schools throughout the United States. In addition, he co-wrote with Samuel Estreicher the book Redefining the Supreme Court's Role: A Theory of Managing the Federal Judicial Process as well as the 141-page NYU Law Review article A Managerial Theory of the Supreme Court's Responsibilities: An Empirical Study in 1984. These works were the centerpiece of a national debate over the creation of a new intermediate court to fit between the United States Courts of Appeals and both the Supreme Court of the United States and state supreme courts. Sexton also wrote How Free Are We?: What the Constitution Says We Can and Cannot Do (with Nat Brandt).

Sexton authored Baseball as a Road to God: Seeing Beyond the Game with Thomas Oliphant and Peter J. Schwartz, a New York Times bestselling non-fiction book published in 2013. The book is based on an NYU undergraduate course that Sexton teaches of the same name, which uses baseball as a vehicle to examine the formative material of religion.

His most recent book is Standing For Reason: The University in a Dogmatic Age, which former U.S. Secretary of State Hillary Clinton called "an incisive analysis of the collapse of political discourse" provided by "one of the leading educators of our time." This work was based on Sexton's "Reflections on Higher Education" published periodically over the course of his presidency of NYU.

== Awards and recognition ==
Sexton has received commendations from NYU in recognition of his contributions to the university, including the 2015 Judge Edward Weinfeld Award (NYU School of Law's highest honor); the 2016 Eugene J. Keogh Award for Distinguished Public Service; and the 2019 Albert Gallatin Medal for Outstanding Contributions to Society (the university's highest honor). In addition, he was honored in 2016 as the recipient of the President's Distinguished Leadership Award from the School of Law's Black, Latino, Asian Pacific American Law Alumni Association.

In addition to his degrees from Fordham University (PhD, MA, and BA) and Harvard University (JD), Sexton holds honorary degrees from 26 institutions: Asian University for Women (2023), Brooklyn Law School (2016), Drexel University (2016), Felician University (2016), Fordham University (2005), University of Haifa (2022), Hamilton College (2011), Iona College (New York) (2011), Jewish Theological Seminary of America (2024), Katholieke Universiteit Leuven (2005), King's College London (2013), Korea Advanced Institute of Science and Technology (2023), Lafayette College (2024), Miami Dade College (2014), Mount Aloysius College (2018), Northeastern University (2018), University of Rochester (2005), Saint Francis College (1996), St. John's University (New York) (2007), Saint Joseph's College (New York) (2010), Union College (2017), University of Strathclyde (2013), University of Surrey (2011), Wake Forest University (2017), University of Warwick (2011), and Yeshiva University (2011).

Sexton has received other awards, including:

- In 1995, Sexton was named the Brooklyn Prep "Alumnus of the Year."
- In 2002, an endowed professorship – the John Edward Sexton Professorship of Law – was created in his honor at the NYU School of Law. Subsequently, the law school established student scholarships in his name and the university's Wagner Graduate School of Public Service established a fellowship program in honor of Sexton's late wife, Lisa Ellen Goldberg. NYU also established a university-wide professorship named in honor of Goldberg, held presently by Vice Chancellor Linda Mills.
- In 2003, the 60th anniversary edition of NYU's Annual Survey of American Law was dedicated to Sexton.
- In 2005, he received the Golden Plate Award of the American Academy of Achievement presented by Awards Council member Stephen A. Schwarzman.
- In 2005, Sexton was selected as the featured speaker of the Harvard Law School Forum.
- In July 2008, he was named a Chevalier de la Legion d'honneur.
- In October 2009, Sexton was suggested as a recipient of a prize for leadership on Washingtonpost.com by Paul R. Portney, dean of the Eller College of Management at the University of Arizona.
- In November 2009, Time named Sexton one of the 10 Best College Presidents.
- In March 2015, Sexton was honored with the Theodore Hesburgh Award by the American Council on Education and the TIAA-CREF Institute. The award is given annually to a college or university president in recognition of outstanding leadership.
- In April 2024, Sexton received the Abu Dhabi Award, which is the highest civilian honor issued by the United Arab Emirates.

== Media ==
Over the years, Sexton has been the subject of public profiles in prominent media venues. In September 2009, he was featured in The New York Times section Sunday Routines. In March 2010, he was interviewed by Bill Moyers on the Public Broadcasting Service show Bill Moyers Journal. In May 2010, he was the subject of a NY1 profile on One on 1 with Budd Mishkin. That July, he appeared on Charlie Rose (talk show) to discuss the Global Network University, NYU's Abu Dhabi campus, and the state of public discourse, among other topics.

As president of NYU, Sexton discussed the nature of the university recurringly on The Open Mind (TV series). He also appeared as a guest on The Colbert Report on December 6, 2006; during his time in the studio, he gave Stephen Colbert a hug, which he was known for giving affectionately on campus. He appeared again on Colbert on March 7, 2013, to promote his book Baseball as a Road to God, which he also discussed twice on MLB Network.

In addition, Sexton has been interviewed repeatedly in the business and popular press, including:

- In August 2008, Sexton was cited in Newsweek magazine in a piece called "The Campus of the Future."
- In May 2010, Sexton was profiled by Bloomberg Businessweek in an article that focused on his priorities for New York University.
- In December 2010, Sexton was cited in the On Leadership section of The Washington Post for his efforts as president of NYU.
- In September 2013, he was the subject of a profile in The New Yorker.

Sexton was interviewed by sociologist Jonathan VanAntwerpen for chapter four of the book Shakespeare, Einstein, and the Bottom Line: The Marketing of Higher Education (David L. Kirp et al.). He was also interviewed by Stephen Nelson about universities and their place in public dialogue for the book Leaders in the Labyrinth.

== Personal life ==
Sexton's marriage to author Kathleen B. Jones, whom he met while a debate coach at St. Brendan's High School, was annulled after five years. Jones described the marriage as a "storybook romance" between a "young debate coach" and an "even younger star debater" in her non-fiction book Living Between Danger and Love.

He met Lisa E. Goldberg, who became his wife in 1976, while they were both students at Harvard Law School. Goldberg, who became president of the Charles H. Revson Foundation, died suddenly of a brain aneurysm on January 21, 2007, at age 54.

Sexton's older child, Jed, is a Harvard graduate, an actor, and math teacher; in 2021, he entered law school and works on pro bono legal matters. He is married to Danielle DeCrette, a former administrative employee at the New York University School of Law. They have three daughters: Julia, Ava, and Natalie. Sexton's younger child is Katherine Lodgen Sexton, a graduate of Yale and the NYU School of Law. She is married to Matt Koons; they have two children.

Thomas Oliphant's New York Times Bestseller Praying for Gil Hodges briefly mentions that Sexton grew up as a Brooklyn Dodgers fan. In fact, Sexton is such a well-known baseball fan that he was an early participant in rotisserie baseball, which later became known as fantasy baseball, as a member of the Eddie Gaedel Baseball League. Sexton was one of a number of public personalities who reminisced about their baseball memories on the HBO special Brooklyn Dodgers - Ghosts of Flatbush. In July 2009, Sexton threw out the first pitch at a Washington Nationals game. He teaches "Baseball as a Road To God" at NYU and in 2013 wrote a book of the same name.

== See also ==
- List of law clerks for the chief justice of the United States

Academic offices
Preceded by Norman Redlich	Dean of New York University School of Law; 1988–2002	Succeeded by Richard Revesz
Preceded by L. Jay Oliva	President of New York University; 2002–2015	Succeeded by Andrew Hamilton
