= Leopold Cohn (Christian clergyman) =

Hungarian-American minister and evangelist (1862–1937)

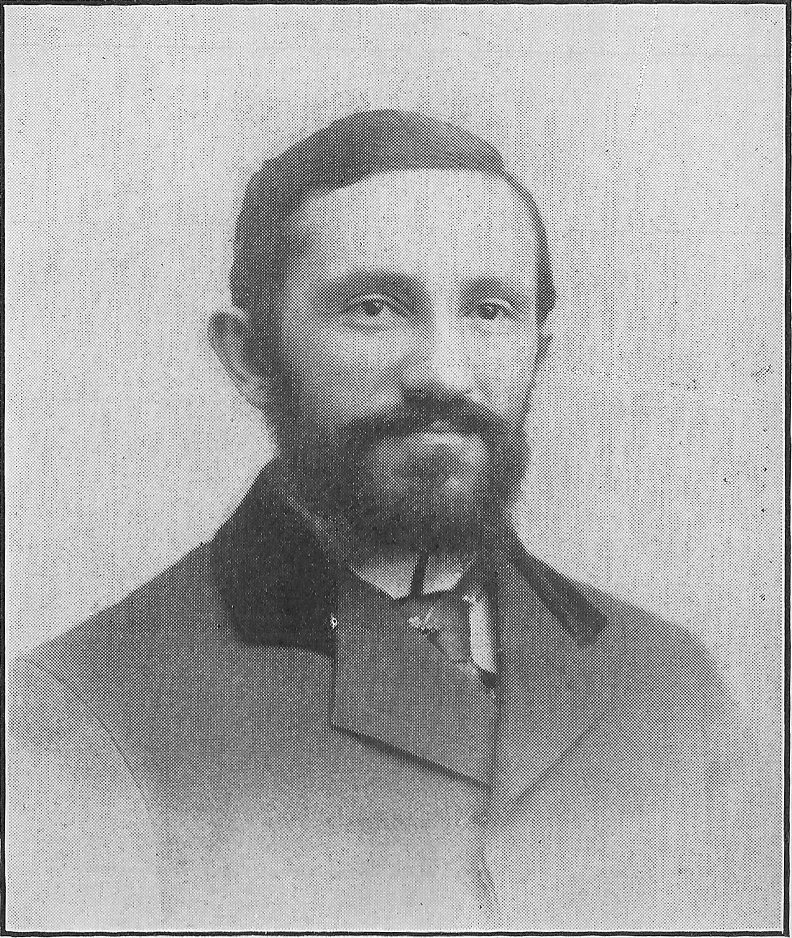
- Rev. Leopold Cohn
- Born: September 12, 1862; Berezna, Hungary
- Died: December 19, 1937 (aged 75); Brooklyn, NY
- Other name: Itsak Leib Joszovics
- Occupation: Missionary
- Known for: Christian evangelism

Leopold Cohn (September 12, 1862, Berezna, Hungary - December 19, 1937, Brooklyn, NY) was a Jewish convert to Evangelicalism who formed the Brownsville Mission to the Jews, an organization that now exists as Chosen People Ministries. Cohn lived in Hungary, and, shortly after his arrival to the United States, converted to Evangelicalism. He was educated in a Presbyterian seminary and ordained a Baptist minister. In his day, he was one of the most successful and controversial Christian evangelists to the Jews. In 1930, Cohn was awarded an honorary degree of Doctor of Divinity by Wheaton College, an Evangelical college.

A 1914 newspaper advertisement for Cohn's "regular gospel services," under the church denomination heading of "Hebrew-Christian."

== Early life according to Cohn's autobiography ==
Leopold Cohn was born in 1862 in the small town of Berezna in eastern Hungary and was orphaned at age seven. His name while in Hungary later became a matter of dispute; by all accounts he went by the name Itzak Lieb (Isaac Leopold) in Hungary, but some claimed his family name was Joczowits/Yosowitz, whereas Cohn claimed his family name was Kahan. He recounts his upbringing in his 1908 autobiography, The Story of a Modern Missionary to an Ancient People. Raised in the Satmar Hasidic tradition, he studied in the Pressburg Yeshiva and claimed to receive rabbinic ordination under Zalman Lieb Teitelbaum in Sziget. Cohn was married in 1880 to Rose Hoffman, and he claimed to serve as an itinerant rabbi among three congregations in the Máramaros region. The accuracy of these claims would be contested in later years.

== Conversion and establishment of the Brownsville Mission ==
Although Cohn said he was accustomed to the weekly Hasidic tradition of weeping for Jerusalem and yearning for the Messiah (Tikkun Chatzot), a new interest in the Messiah was sparked by his study of the Talmud and the book of Daniel. He shared his questions about the Messiah with an unnamed Hungarian rabbi, who suggested that Cohn travel to the United States to learn more about the Messiah.

Cohn arrived in New York City in 1892. Soon after he arrived, he passed by DeWitt Memorial Presbyterian Church in lower Manhattan, where he saw a sign in Hebrew saying, “Meetings for Jews.” Upon entering, he found an evangelistic service in Yiddish led by Jewish missionary Hermann Warszawiak. The next day, Warszawiak gave Cohn a New Testament, and soon thereafter Cohn accepted Jesus as the Messiah.

Cohn was public about his new belief and was opposed by the Jewish community as an apostate. Warszawiak secured lodging for Cohn among sympathetic Christians, and they advised he change his name from Kahan to Cohn. He was still not safe, so Cohn's benefactors sent him to Scotland to receive theological training and tutoring in English. Cohn was baptized in Edinburgh in June 1892, and he spent the next year in theological studies.

Cohn returned to New York City in October 1893, accompanied by his wife and children. Initially intending to work with Warszawiak, Cohn severed ties with Warszawiak after Warszawiak became embroiled in financial scandal. No longer connected to the Presbyterians who had funded his schooling, Cohn moved to Brownsville, Brooklyn, and began regular evangelistic meetings in October 1894. He called his mission the Brownsville Mission to the Jews.

== Early years of the Brownsville and Williamsburg Mission ==
Initially, Cohn faced significant opposition from both Christian and Jewish communities. However, with the support of Pastor Thomas J. Whitaker and a small group of Baptist pastors, Cohn's mission began to flourish. Beginning in 1896 he was given a salary by the American Baptist Home Mission Society as their missionary to the Jews of Brooklyn, a partnership that lasted through 1907. He involved his wife and children in the ministry and established a sewing school for girls, an English language class for Jewish women, and a dispensary to meet the medical needs of immigrant Jews. The mission grew rapidly, attracting large numbers of Jewish immigrants who sought refuge from persecution in Eastern Europe. In late 1895, he began a monthly newsletter entitled The Chosen People that was printed in limited quantities. Its circulation grew over time as the mission's work expanded. By 1898, Cohn was printing around five hundred copies each month, which he distributed among his contacts and supporters in Brooklyn churches. By 1911, Cohn's ministry was incorporated as the Williamsburg Mission to the Jews and received $25,000 per year in donations, making it the largest Jewish mission in the United States.

== Controversy over Cohn’s identity ==
In the early 1910s, Cohn faced accusations that he was not the Orthodox rabbi from Hungary as he claimed to be but rather a criminal named Izsak Lieb Joszovics who had fled legal charges and had taken on a false identity as a rabbi when he arrived in America. These accusations circled the Jewish press but were magnified as legal accusations by Jewish-Christian rivals such as Alexander Neuowich, Philippe Spievacque, and Benjamin Aaron Moses Schapiro, who were interested in discrediting Cohn's ministry. Neuowich had been personally acquainted with Cohn through his ministry, and Spievacque and Schapiro were the leaders of a competing Jewish mission, the Brooklyn Christian Mission to the Jews. Cohn and his accusers fought several cases against each other in the years 1913–18. Cohn's accusers sought to portray Cohn as a womanizer, financial swindler, murderer, and not a rabbi. Cohn sought to clear his name by proving the accusations to be fraudulent. Multiple recent publications have investigated the controversy.

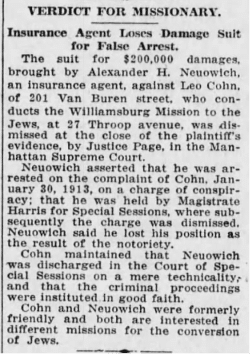
Leopold Cohn's 1915 Court Verdict, Brooklyn Daily Eagle, April 15, 1915

After some inconclusive court appearances in 1913, the case was argued in the New York Supreme Court in 1915 as Alexander H. Neuowich vs. Leopold Cohn. Colonel Alexander S. Bacon served as the plaintiff's attorney arguing against Cohn. The court records show that Cohn's accusers cited a “Hungarian document” that purported to describe Cohn as Joszovics, who had been convicted of fraud in Hungary. The prosecution did not submit this document into evidence. The plaintiff also called upon witnesses to testify about Cohn's name in Hungary, but the court transcripts show that some of the witnesses testified that his name had been Kahan, and others who said otherwise showed implausible personal acquaintance with Cohn. The judge dismissed the case.

Cohn's legal troubles caused problems for his reputation in the Christian community. He began losing financial support, notably from Moody Bible Institute. In response to ongoing rumors and allegations about his identity and finances, Cohn proposed an independent committee be formed in 1916 to fully investigate all charges. The committee consisted of Rev. John F. Carson of the Presbyterian Church of America, Mr. Hugh H. Monro of the Montclair National Bank, and Mr. E.B. Buckalew of Moody Bible Institute. The committee conducted a two-month investigation involving interviews with numerous witnesses and review of financial records.

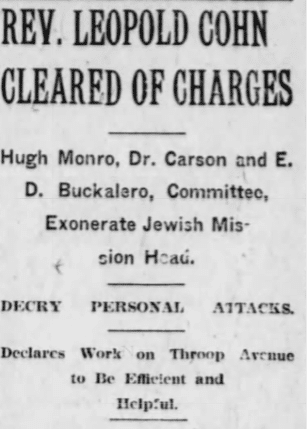
1916 Committee's Abridged Report in the Brooklyn Daily Eagle, September 22, 1916

The committee interviewed Cohn, Neuowich, Spievacque, and Schapiro, and they also received the “Hungarian document.” After consulting Hungarian legal experts and the content of the document itself, they found that the Hungarian document was fraudulent. It contained multiple factual errors about Cohn's physical description, including the wrong shape of Cohn's chin when Cohn had worn a Hasidic beard during the time in question. The description also included a red spot under his eye, but witnesses testified this scar came from an incident in Brooklyn after 1894, long after the supposed Hungarian conviction. The committee also found evidence of Cohn's accusers perjuring themselves. In the end, the committee declared Cohn to be innocent of all charges, and they published their lengthy decision in newspapers and leading Christian magazines.

Cohn's accusers appealed the 1915 court case, but their appeal was thrown out again in 1917. In 1918, Spievacque sued Cohn for the same reasons, and the judge shrewdly awarded Spievacque $1, closing the case and ending further appeals. Also in 1918, the attorney who represented Cohn's accusers, Alexander S. Bacon, published a book attacking Cohn. However, Cohn had already regained the respect of the Christian community through his court cases and committee investigation, and he continued serving with his organization until his death in 1937. The wider Jewish community continued to be skeptical of Cohn's identity.

== Later years and death ==
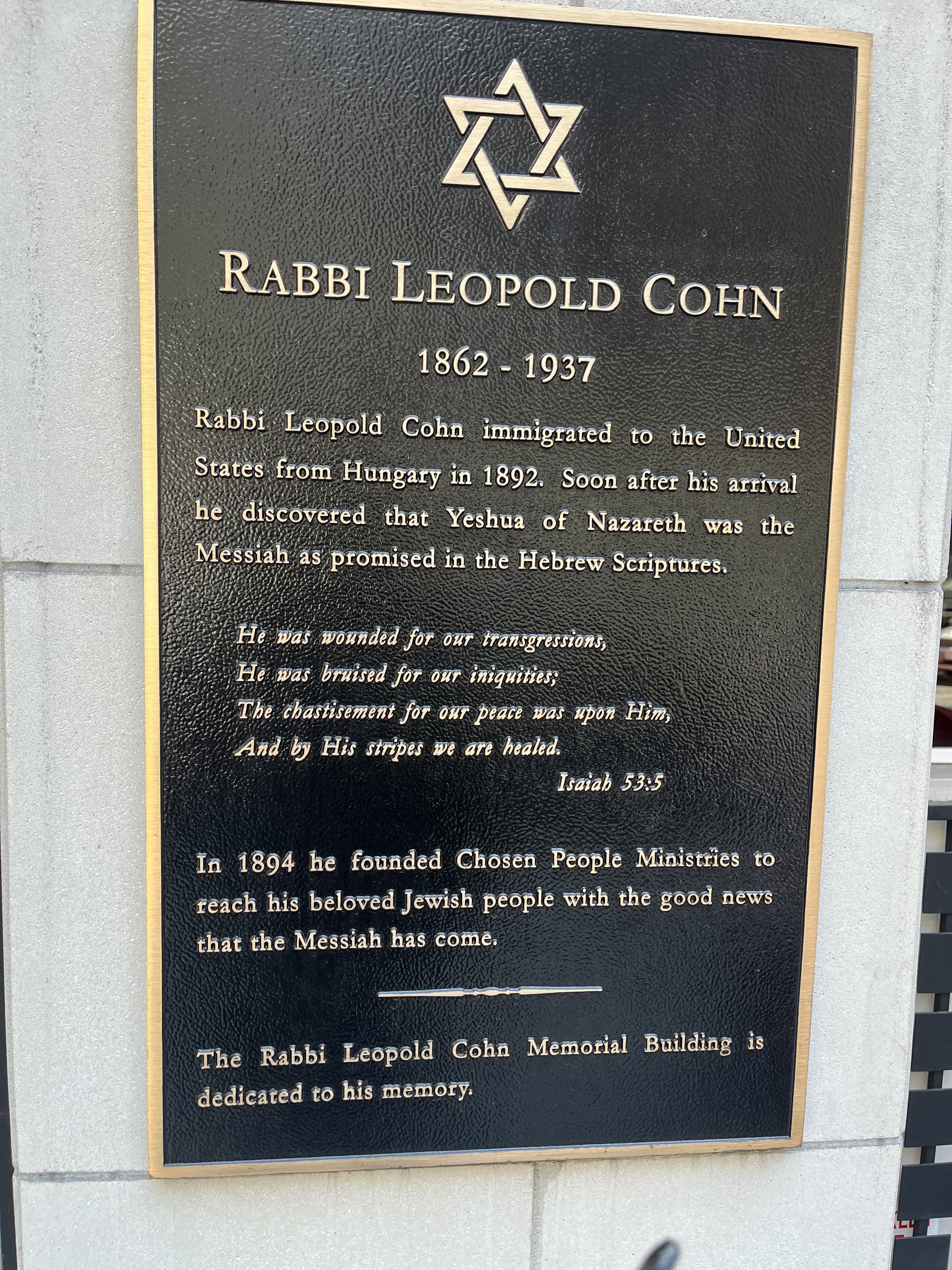
Leopold Cohn memorial plaque in New York City

In 1920, Cohn turned over most of the day-to-day operations of the mission to his son, Joseph Hoffman Cohn, while he continued to write and preach. In 1924, the organization changed its name to the American Board of Missions to the Jews. Cohn died in 1937, but the organization he founded continued to grow after his death.

== Legacy ==
The controversy surrounding Cohn's identity and character during his lifetime highlights the complexities of evangelistic ministry in interfaith contexts. He received opposition from segments of the Christian community, from fellow Hebrew-Christian missionaries, and from the wider Jewish community. He was unique in that his Hasidic background gave him competencies that other Jewish missions lacked, but also a way of life that the Christian community did not understand. Unlike many Jewish missionaries of his day, Cohn continued with Jewish observances such as Saturday (not Sunday) Sabbath and keeping kosher laws; and his writings included sympathetic references to many Orthodox Jewish religious works. Much of this was possible because Cohn's mission was financially independent of denominational control. This enabled him to promote a form of Jewish Christianity that did not have to abide by Christian cultural standards.

Theologically, Cohn found success in promoting his premillennial eschatology and his focus on Jewish evangelism in America among Baptists and Presbyterians. His primary means for disseminating his views were The Chosen People newsletter and prophecy conferences. Cohn's son, Joseph Hoffman Cohn, continued his father's legacy by leading the American Board of Missions to the Jews through his death in 1953.
