= Thomas Oliphant =

Thomas or Tom Oliphant may refer to:

- Thomas Oliphant (journalist), American journalist
- Thomas Oliphant (lyricist), Scottish musician, artist and author
- Tom Oliphant (racing driver), British racing driver
