= John Rettaliata =

American academic administrator (1911–2009)

John Theodore Rettaliata

President of the Illinois Institute of Technology
- In office 1952–1973
- Preceded by: Henry Townley Heald
- Succeeded by: Maynard P. Venema

Personal details
- Born: August 18, 1911 Baltimore
- Died: August 8, 2009 (aged 97)
- Children: Stephen, Brian, and Patricia
- Education: Baltimore Polytechnic Institute; Johns Hopkins University
- Profession: Fluid dynamicist

John Theodore Rettaliata (August 18, 1911 – August 8, 2009) was a fluid dynamicist who was president of Illinois Institute of Technology for 21 years, from 1952 to 1973, and served on President Dwight D. Eisenhower's National Aeronautics and Space Council, the predecessor to NASA. He received the American Society of Mechanical Engineers/Pi Tau Sigma joint Gold Medal in 1942, received the Distinguished Alumnus Award of Johns Hopkins University, was a National Honorary Member of the Triangle Fraternity, and held a lifetime position on the Museum of Science and Industry Board of Trustees. He also held the distinction of being one of the first people to fly in a jet aircraft. Illinois Institute of Technology has a professorial position dedicated to Rettaliata, the John T. Rettaliata Distinguished Professor of Mechanical and Aerospace Engineering, currently occupied by Hassan M. Nagib.

== Biography ==
Rettaliata attended the Baltimore Polytechnic Institute magnet high school which enabled him to enter Johns Hopkins University as a sophomore in 1929. He graduated with a Ph.D. in 1936. Rettaliata died on August 8, 2009, at the age of 97.

== Notes ==
Academic offices
Preceded by Henry Townley Heald	President of the Illinois Institute of Technology; 1952–1973	Succeeded by Maynard P. Venema
