= L. Jay Oliva =

14th President of New York University
- In office November 21, 1991 – May 16, 2002
- Preceded by: John Brademas
- Succeeded by: John Sexton

Personal details
- Born: Lawrence Jay Oliva; September 23, 1933 Walden, New York, U.S.
- Died: April 17, 2014 (aged 80) Manhattan, New York, U.S.
- Education: Manhattan College (BA); Syracuse University (MA, PhD)

Lawrence Jay Oliva (September 23, 1933 – April 17, 2014), known as L. Jay Oliva, was the 14th president of New York University.

== Life and career ==
Born in Walden, New York he earned a B.A. from Manhattan College (1955) and a M.A. (1957)/Ph.D. (1960) from Syracuse University. He was a University Fellow at Syracuse, a Fribourg Fellow at the University of Paris and a member of Phi Gamma Delta. His father was Italian and his mother was an Irish-speaker from County Galway, Ireland; he lent NYU to Irish-themed celebrations and exhibitions under the aegis of his presidency of New York University. He also supported the formal establishment of the university's Irish and Irish-American Studies program within Glucksman Ireland House NYU in 1993.

Oliva authored and edited numerous works on Russian and European history, including, "Misalliance: A Study of French Policy in Russia During the Seven Years' War" (New York University Press, 1964) and "Russia in the Era of Peter the Great" (Prentice-Hall, 1969). His fields of academic specialization are 18th-century Russia, Russian diplomatic history and 18th-century Europe.

Oliva was given honorary degrees by Tel Aviv University (Doctor of Philosophy, 1994); University College Dublin (Doctor of Literature, 1993); Hebrew Union College (Doctor of Humane Letters, 1992); Saint Thomas Aquinas College (Doctor of Laws, 1989); and Manhattan College (Doctor of Humane Letters, 1987). He was decorated a chevalier of the French Legion of Honor (1997) and received the Premio Guido Dorso of Italy (1998).

Through Oliva's initiative, NYU was the founding member of the League of World Universities, established in 1991, whose membership now represents nearly fifty of the world's great urban universities. La Pietra, a cluster of five villas in Tuscany bequeathed to NYU by the late Sir Harold Acton, and the Lillian Vernon Center for International Affairs at Washington Square, serve as hubs for international activities that draw scholars and students from around the world. Oliva also created the "NYU Speaking Freely" program to provide students with opportunities for language learning outside the classroom. In recognition of this work, he received the Foreign Language Advocacy Award in 2001 from the Northeast Conference on the Teaching of Foreign Languages. He served as president of New York University from 1991 until May 16, 2002. Under his leadership the school's fund-raising efforts soared, increasing from approximately $100 million annually in 1991 to more the $350 million in 2001. In 1995 Oliva oversaw the completion of what was at that time the first billion-dollar campaign undertaken by an American university. Launched in 1985 under Oliva's predecessor, John Brademas, the campaign was successfully completed five years ahead of schedule. He signed the first contract between a private university and a graduate assistant labor union, the Graduate Student Organizing Committee of Local 2110/United Auto Workers.

Oliva died on April 17, 2014, aged 80, of pancreatic cancer.

Academic offices
Preceded by John Brademas	President of New York University; 1991–2002	Succeeded by John Sexton
