= James McNaughton Hester =

American academic leader (1924–2014)

11th President of New York University
- In office 1962–1975
- Preceded by: Carroll Vincent Newsom
- Succeeded by: John C. Sawhill

Personal details
- Born: April 19, 1924; Chester, Pennsylvania, U.S.
- Died: December 31, 2014 (aged 90); Princeton, New Jersey, U.S.
- Spouse: Janet Rodes (m. 1953)
- Education: Princeton University (BA); Pembroke College, Oxford (BPhil, DPhil)

James McNaughton Hester (April 19, 1924 – December 31, 2014) was an internationally recognized educator.

Hester was born in Chester, Pennsylvania. He spent his boyhood at various stations to which his father, a United States Navy Chaplain, was assigned, including Hawaii and Samoa. In 1942, he graduated from Woodrow Wilson High School in Long Beach, California. After joining the United States Marine Corps' officer candidate program, he was trained to be a Japanese-language officer. He subsequently served in Japan in a civilian capacity as the civil information and education officer on the Fukuoka Military Government Team.

== Academic career ==
Hester began his academic career at Princeton University, where he excelled in the humanities, election to Phi Beta Kappa, and earned an A.B. degree. He won honors in the humanities, election to Phi Beta Kappa, and was awarded an A.B. degree in 1945. As a Rhodes Scholar, he crossed the Atlantic to Pembroke College, Oxford, earning a bachelor's degree Philosophy, Politics and Economics in 1947. Hester received a D.Phil. in 1955 from Oxford University.

Upon his return to the United States in 1950, he became assistant to the American Secretary to the Rhodes Trustees.

== Military career ==
Recalled to active duty with the Marines in 1951, Hester served seventeen months as a battalion adjutant and instructor at Marine Corps Base Quantico, Quantico, Virginia. After leaving the services, he spent several months at the National Archives in Washington, D.C., doing research for his doctoral thesis. He received the D. Phil. degree from Oxford University in 1955.

== University leadership ==
After three years of business experience in management consultation and consumer research, Hester returned to academic life. In 1957, he became provost (administrative and academic head) of the Brooklyn Center of Long Island University in New York City and subsequently Vice President of Long Island University. In 1960, he became Dean of both undergraduate and graduate schools of arts and science at New York University. He became 11th President of New York University in 1962, at the age of 37. The University awarded him an honorary degree (L.H.D.) in 1977.

Hester was appointed first Rector of the United Nations University in November 1974 by United Nations Secretary General Kurt Waldheim after a worldwide search. He commenced full-time duty as Rector at the University's headquarters in Tokyo in September 1975.

Hester served as chairman of the President's Task Force on Priorities in Higher Education in the United States (1969). He was also president and a member of the executive committee of the Association of Colleges and Universities of the State of New York, and was president and member of the board of trustees of its Commission on Independent Colleges.

Hester served on the board of the American Council on Education, on the New York State Regents Advisory Council on Higher Education and Regional Co-ordinating Council for Post Secondary Education in New York City. He was the United States member on the Administrative Board of the International Association of Universities and a member of the executive committee of the Association of American Universities.

== Retirement ==
Upon leaving the rectorship, Hester served a term as President of The New York Botanical Garden, and until his death remained President of the Harry Frank Guggenheim Foundation in New York, an operating foundation charged by its founder to support research on the causes, manifestations and control of violence, aggression, and dominance. This programme is carried out through grants in a wide variety of fields and by conferences and publications.

After retiring from full-time involvement in the academic world, Hester continued a second career as highly regarded artist, whose oil paintings and portraits were commissioned by a wide array of individuals and institutions.

== Personal life ==
Hester was married in 1953 to the former Janet Rodes. They had three children, Janet, Margaret and Martha. He died 31 December 2014 in Princeton, New Jersey.

== Honors ==
Hester held honorary degrees from many leading universities and colleges, and was a Chevalier of the French Legion of Honour. In 1981, H.M. Emperor Showa of Japan conferred upon Hester the Order of the Sacred Treasure, First Class.

Academic offices
Preceded by Carroll Vincent Newsom	President of New York University; 1962–1975	Succeeded by John C. Sawhill
