= Thomas Cuming Hall =

American theologian (1858–1936)

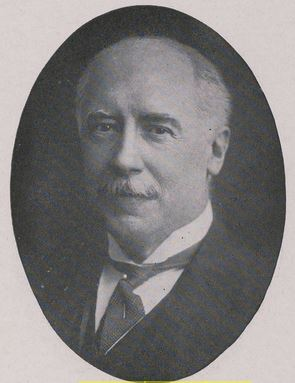
Thomas Cuming Hall

Thomas Cuming Hall (born 1858, died on May 27, 1936, at Göttingen, Germany) was an American Presbyterian theologian, son of the Rev. John Hall (1829-98). He was born at Armagh, Ireland and arrived in America in 1867 with his parents when his father took up the post of pastor at the Fifth Avenue Presbyterian Church; he was naturalized on May 8, 1882. He graduated from Princeton University in 1879 and from Union Theological Seminary in 1882, and studied at Berlin and Göttingen 1882–83. Ordained in 1883, he held pastorates at Omaha, Neb. (1883–86), and Chicago (1886–97), and in 1898 became professor of Christian ethics at Union Seminary. In 1884 he married German Jennie Elizabeth Louise Bartling in London, England. In 1914 he was chosen to be Roosevelt professor at the University of Berlin during 1915–16. During World War I he championed the German cause and was implicated in the conspiracy, masterminded by Franz von Rintelen, to sabotage supplies to the Allies. He was later decorated with the Order of the Crown by the German Emperor.

== Writings ==
- The Power of an Endless Life (1893)
- The Social Meaning of the Modern Religious Movements in England (1900)
- The Messages of Jesus According to the Synoptists (1901; 1908)
- John Hall, Pastor and Preacher: A Biography by his Son (1901)
- Social Solutions in the Light of Christian Ethics (1910)
- The History of Ethics within Organized Christianity (1910)
- Historical Setting of the Early Gospel (1912)
- Religion and Life (1913)
