= Susan Spencer =

American journalist

- Born: November 28, 1946 (age 79); Memphis, Tennessee
- Education: Michigan State University
- Occupations: News anchor, reporter, correspondent for 48 Hours Mystery
- Notable credit(s): Emmy Award, Environmental Defense Fund Award, RTNDA Edward R. Murrow Award
- Spouse: Thomas Oliphant

Susan Spencer is an American television news reporter and correspondent for 48 Hours Mystery and CBS Sunday Morning.

Spencer was born in Memphis, Tennessee. She graduated from Michigan State University in 1968 with a bachelor's degree in communications and German literature. The following year, she completed her master's in journalism from Columbia University.

== Career ==
From 1971 to 1972, Spencer worked as a researcher for CBS-owned WCBS-TV in New York. She was also a writer and producer for public affairs broadcast at WKPC-TV in Louisville, Kentucky. From 1972 to 1977, she worked for Minneapolis-based CBS station WCCO-TV, where she was reporter and co-anchor. She joined CBS News' Washington bureau in 1977 and became a correspondent in 1978. In 1986, she was named medical correspondent for CBS News. She anchored the CBS Sunday Night News from 1987 to 1988. Also from 1987 through 1988, she was a substitute anchor and from 1988 through 1989, anchor of the Sunday edition of CBS Evening News. In 1989, she reported on the death of Emperor Hirohito of Japan and Tiananmen Square protests. A year later, based in Riyadh, Saudi Arabia, Spencer reported major international events such as the Persian Gulf War.

As national correspondent, she also covered the first inauguration of President Bill Clinton and the re-election campaign of President George Herbert Walker Bush. She was then CBS News' White House correspondent and the main correspondent for its "Eye on America" segments. In 1993, she was named a correspondent for 48 Hours, covering subjects ranging from drug wars in Colombia to custody battles in the United States.

== Awards ==
Spencer has been recognized with Emmy Awards for her 48 Hours stories, an Environmental Defense Fund Award, and a RTNDA Edward R. Murrow Award for Overall Excellence for a story about the struggle of a child to find a match for an organ transplant.

Susan's husband Thomas Oliphant is a former political columnist for the Boston Globe.
