= Elmer Ellsworth Brown =

American educator

Elmer Brown
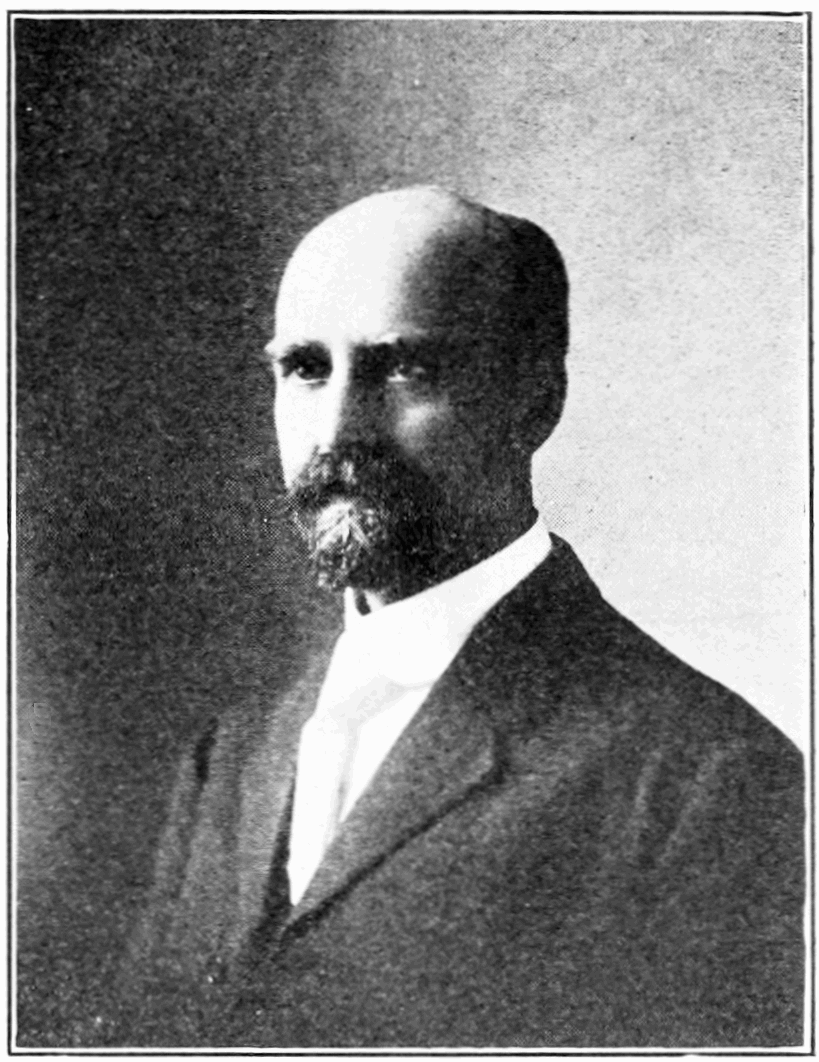

7th President of New York University
- In office 1911–1933
- Preceded by: Henry MacCracken
- Succeeded by: Harry Woodburn Chase

United States Commissioner of Education
- In office July 1, 1906 – June 30, 1911
- President: Theodore Roosevelt; William Howard Taft
- Preceded by: William Harris
- Succeeded by: Philander Claxton

Personal details
- Born: August 28, 1861 Kiantone, New York, U.S.
- Died: November 3, 1934 (aged 73) New York City, New York, U.S.
- Spouse: Fanny Fosten Eddy (m. 1889)
- Education: New York University; Illinois State University; University of Michigan (BA); University of Halle-Wittenberg (MA, PhD)

Elmer Ellsworth Brown (1861–1934) was an American educator.

== Biography ==
Born at Kiantone in Chautauqua County, New York, Elmer Ellsworth Brown studied at New York University (NYU), graduated from Illinois State Normal University in 1881 and at the University of Michigan (A.B., 1889); then he studied in Germany and received a Ph.D. from the University of Halle in 1890.

He married Fanny Fosten Eddy on June 29, 1889.

He was principal of public schools in Belvidere, Illinois, in 1881-84, assistant state secretary of the YMCA of Illinois (1884–87), and principal of the high school at Jackson, Michigan, in 1890–91. He taught education at the University of Michigan (1891–93) and at the University of California, Berkeley (1893–1906). After directing the reorganization of the United States Bureau of Education as U.S. Commissioner of Education (1906–11), he became chancellor of New York University, where he founded NYU Press in 1916 "to publish contributions to higher learning by eminent scholars."

He was made fellow of the American Academy of Arts and Sciences and vice president of the education section in 1907. He led the Andiron Club from 1916 to 1922 and was associated with the Eucleian Society. Brown retired from NYU in 1933 and died in 1934 in New York.

== Works ==
His works include:

- The Making of Our Middle Schools (1903).
- The Origin of American State Universities (1905).
- Government by Influences, and Other Addresses (1909).
- An Efficient Organization and Enlarged Scope for the Bureau of Education (1910).
- A Few Remarks (1933).

== Sources ==
- Beach, Chandler B., ed. (1914). "Brown, Elmer Ellsworth" . The New Student's Reference Work . Chicago: F. E. Compton and Co.
- Rines, George Edwin, ed. (1920). "Brown, Elmer Ellsworth" . Encyclopedia Americana.

Political offices
Preceded by William Harris	United States Commissioner of Education; 1906–1911	Succeeded by Philander Claxton
Academic offices
Preceded by Henry MacCracken	Chancellor of New York University; 1911–1933	Succeeded by Harry Chase
