= Philander Claxton =

American educator (1862–1957)

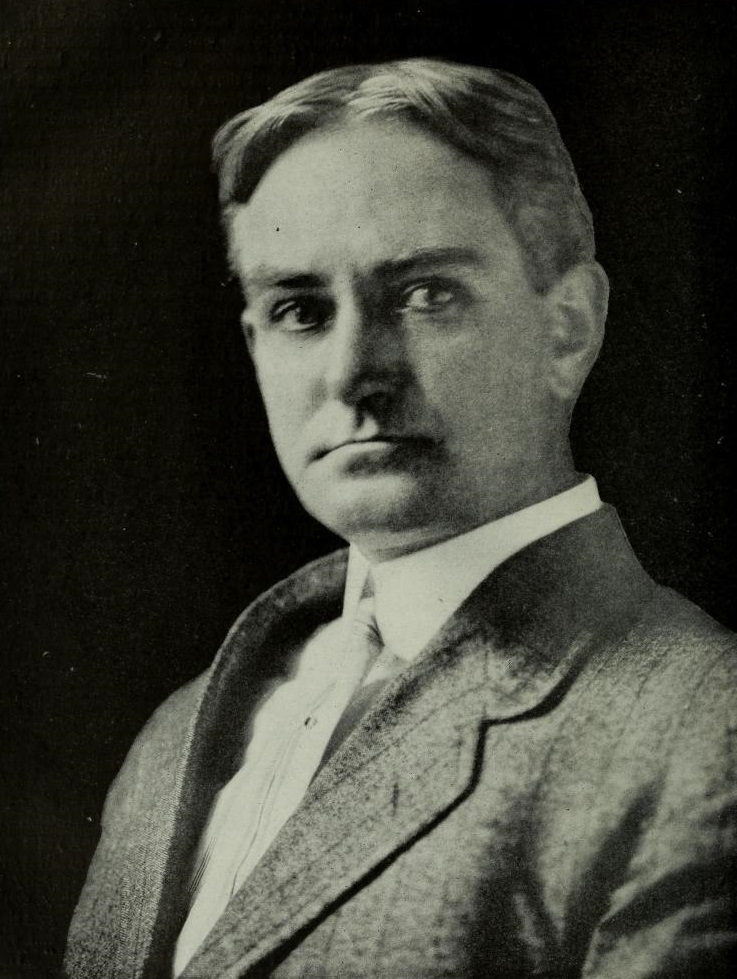

United States Commissioner of Education
- In office June 30, 1911 – June 2, 1921
- President: William Taft; Woodrow Wilson; Warren Harding
- Preceded by: Elmer Brown
- Succeeded by: John Tigert

Personal details
- Born: September 28, 1862 Shelbyville, Tennessee, U.S.
- Died: January 12, 1957 (aged 94) Knoxville, Tennessee, U.S.
- Education: University of Tennessee, Knoxville (BA, MA); Johns Hopkins University

Philander Priestly Claxton (September 28, 1862 – January 12, 1957) was an American educator and administrator.

== Biography ==
Philander Claxton was born in Bedford County, Tennessee. He was educated at the University of Tennessee, where he obtained both his Bachelor (1882) and Masters of Arts (1887). He continued his studies at Johns Hopkins University, as well as in Germany. Claxton received an honorary Litt.D. from Bates College in 1906.

He became the superintendent of schools in North Carolina (1883–93) and subsequently he became professor of pedagogy and German at the North Carolina State Normal and Industrial College from 1893 to 1902, and in 1896 director of that institution's Practice and Observation School. Professor Claxton was also editor of the North Carolina Journal of Education (1897-1901) and of the Atlantic Educational Journal (1901–03). He then moved back to his home state of Tennessee in 1902 to take up the post of Professor of Education at the University of Tennessee, where he taught until 1911.

Claxton was a member of the Southern Education Board, which during the early years of the twentieth century worked assiduously to promote interest in public schooling in the South. At the University of Tennessee, he organized and headed the first Department of Education and served as the superintendent (1902–11) of the Summer School of the South which, during a sixteen-year existence, improved the education of over 32,000 teachers in southern schools.

He had a distinguished career as the United States Commissioner of Education. The United States Bureau of Education became an important branch of the government as under his guidance its role and activities were substantially expanded. As Commissioner of Education under three presidents, Claxton labored through writings and addresses to raise in the public consciousness the connection between improved education and a vigorous and prosperous democracy. He also helped to write the legislation authorizing rehabilitative education for World War I veterans and developed the first plan for federal aid for vocational education.

Claxton continued in the academic education world after he retired from the Commission in 1921. He was provost of the University of Alabama until 1923 when he moved to Oklahoma to become Superintendent of Schools in Tulsa. He held that latter post from 1923 to 1929. In 1930, he returned once more to Tennessee where he again became involved in academic education as the President of the Austin Peay Normal School in Clarksville until he retired in 1946.

While his role was more directly focused on the improvement of schools at the lower levels — for which he has been hailed as the Horace Mann of the South — he exercised considerable influence on higher education. Two of his public pronouncements perhaps best sum up his concern for issues surrounding teacher education:

The state must give the University wise direction, keeping it free from all influences of partisan politics, sectarian bias, social caste, and unrighteous personal ambitions.

— Philander Claxton

and

"The most important work of a college president ... is the selection of teachers, relieving them of all unnecessary duties that may interfere with teaching."

— Philander Claxton

== Legacy ==
The Philander P. Claxton Award was initiated by the Tennessee Conference of the American Association of University Professors in 1986 to honor an individual who had made significant contributions to higher education in Tennessee. The recipient is to embody the highest ideals of the academic profession and of the Association.

Claxton also has an elementary school named for him. P.P. Claxton elementary school in Asheville, North Carolina is named for him.

Claxton, Georgia is reputed, by some historians, to be named for Claxton.

Claxton Elementary School in Claxton, Anderson County, Tennessee in 1915 was named in his honor. Still an active school.

Political offices
Preceded by Elmer Brown	United States Commissioner of Education; 1911–1921	Succeeded by John Tigert
