= League of World Universities =

The League of World Universities is an international organization consisting of rectors and presidents from urban universities across six continents. The league and its 47 representatives gather every two years to discuss global issues in education. L. Jay Oliva formed the organization in 1991, just after he was inaugurated president of New York University.
