= New York University Press =

University press that is part of New York University

- Parent company: New York University
- Founded: 1916
- Founder: Elmer Ellsworth Brown
- Country of origin: United States
- Headquarters location: New York, New York
- Distribution: Ingram Publisher Services (US); Combined Academic Publishers (UK)
- Publication types: Books
- Official website: nyupress.org

New York University Press (or NYU Press) is a university press that is part of New York University.

== History ==
NYU Press was founded in 1916 by the then chancellor of NYU, Elmer Ellsworth Brown.

== Directors ==
- Arthur Huntington Nason, 1916–1932
- No director, 1932–1946
- Jean B. Barr (interim director), 1946–1952
- Filmore Hyde, 1952–1957
- Wilbur McKee, acting director, 1957–1958
- William B. Harvey, 1958–1966
- Christopher Kentera, 1966–1974
- Malcolm C. Johnson, 1974–1981
- Colin Jones, 1981–1996
- Niko Pfund, 1996–2000
- Steve Maikowski, 2001–2014
- Ellen Chodosh, 2014–2024
- Eric Schwartz, 2024–present

== Notable publications ==
Once best known for publishing The Collected Writings of Walt Whitman, NYU Press has now published numerous award-winning scholarly works, such as Convergence Culture (2007) by Henry Jenkins, The Rabbi's Wife (2006) by Shuly Schwartz, and The Encyclopedia of Jewish Life Before and During the Holocaust (2002). Other well-known names published by the press include Cary Nelson, Jonathon Hafetz, Samuel R. Delany, and Mark Denbeaux.

== See also ==
- List of English-language book publishing companies
- List of university presses
- Library of Arabic Literature
