= Baseball as a Road to God =

2013 book by John Sexton

- Author: John Sexton; Thomas Oliphant; Peter J. Schwartz
- Language: English
- Genre: Non-fiction
- Publisher: Gotham Books
- Publication date: 2013
- Publication place: United States
- Media type: Print (Hardcover)
- Pages: 242
- ISBN: 978-1-592-40754-5
- Dewey Decimal: 796.35701-dc23
- LC Class: GV867.S58 2013

Baseball as a Road to God: Seeing Beyond the Game is a book written by John Sexton that discusses the game of baseball in the context of religion. The book is co-authored with Thomas Oliphant and Peter J. Schwartz; the foreword is written by Doris Kearns Goodwin. Sexton, a Catholic, grew up in New York City and as a young man was a Brooklyn Dodgers fan. A graduate of a Jesuit prep high school, Sexton holds an M.A. in comparative religion (1965), and a Ph.D. in history of American religion (1978) from Fordham University. Sexton served as the President of New York University from 2002 to 2016.

== Background ==
Baseball as a Road to God is based on a course John Sexton has taught at New York University for more than a decade. Sexton’s course originated when one of his students asked him why he was such a big baseball fan because the sport, according to the student, was not very interesting. Reportedly, Sexton responded, “You are among the great unwashed. But there is hope for your soul.”

On the night before opening day, the end of a baseball fan's version of Advent, John Sexton entered his classroom at New York University to speak of Joe DiMaggio. He came to speak, too, of Ernest Hemingway and Gay Talese, of Lord Krishna and a sacred tree in the Amazon, and what he called 'this notion of touching the ineffable'. Around Dr. Sexton sat 18 undergraduates, some religious and some not, some bleacher diehards and some not, all of them enrolled in a course titled Baseball as a Road to God. It is the sort of course in which the teaching assistants go by the angelic designation Celestials and discussion sections are named for Derek Jeter and Willie Mays among other diamond luminaries.

== Book Summary ==
Similar to the class Sexton teaches, the book uses the game of baseball to help religious faith and the spiritual life. The book, similar to a baseball game, is divided into chapters, each of which is referred to as an “inning”.

- Chapter 1: First Inning - Sacred Space and Time
- Chapter 2: Second Inning – Faith
- Chapter 3: Third Inning – Doubt
- Chapter 4: Fourth Inning – Conversion
- Chapter 5: Fifth Inning – Miracles
- Chapter 6: Sixth Inning – Blessings and Curses
- Chapter 7: Seventh Inning – Saints and Sinners
- Chapter 8: Eight Inning – Community
- Chapter 9: Ninth Inning – Nostalgia (And the Myth of the Eternal Return)
- Chapter 10: The Clubhouse

In each chapter, Sexton discusses the game’s greatest moments, legendary characters, time honored rituals, and famous acts of faith and betrayal. An example to Sexton’s approach is found in Seventh Inning - Saints and Sinners where Sexton takes the reader on a course that begins with the concept of canonization and then walks it forward to the Baseball Hall of Fame in Cooperstown, NY. Along the way, Sexton introduces the reader to various baseball sinners, chief among them being Ty Cobb.

== Reception and reviews ==
Critical reviews have been positive. In their reviews, many critics identify with Sexton’s love for baseball and the game's ability to bring a sense of renewal each spring.

Kearns’ foreword to the book has also garnered praise.

In a lovely foreword to the book, historian Doris Kearns Goodwin — born, like Sexton, a Brooklyn Dodgers fan, she made the inspired choice of becoming a learned devotee of the Red Sox — tells of helping Gil Hodges break out of a batting slump by giving him "the St. Christopher’s medal blessed by the pope that I had won in a catechism contest by knowing the seven deadly sins." She notes that since St. Christopher "was the patron saint of travel, I was certain that my medal had guided Hodges safely around the bases."

A discordant note was offered by E.J. Dionne of The Washington Post. Dionne, a Boston Red Sox fan, had a positive review of the book but objected to Sexton’s dismissive attitude toward Red Sox fans.
