= Linda G. Mills =

American academic and administrator (born 1957)

Linda Mills
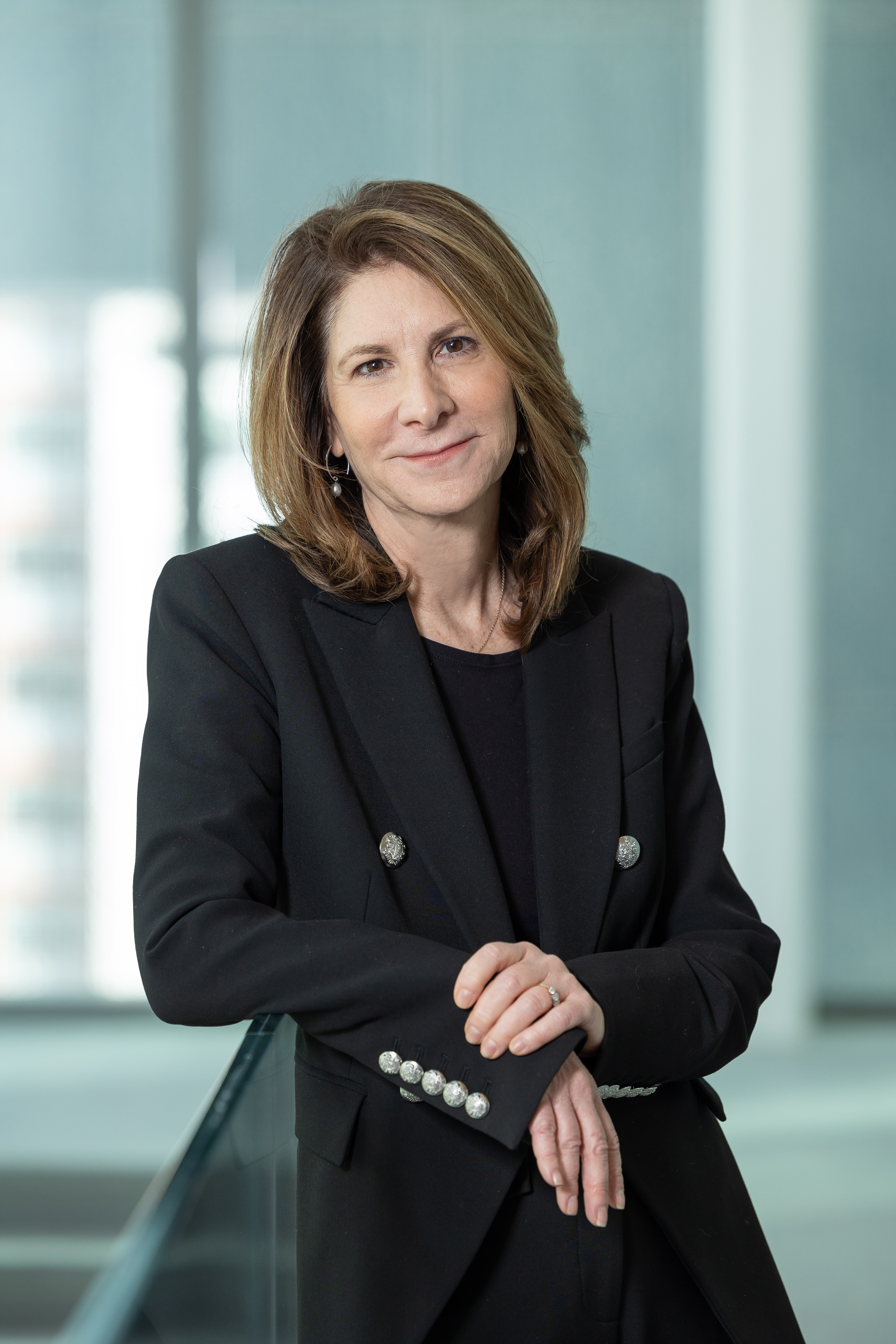
- Mills in 2023

17th President of New York University
- Incumbent
- Assumed office July 1, 2023
- Preceded by: Andrew D. Hamilton

Personal details
- Born: October 30, 1957 (age 68)
- Spouse: Peter Goodrich
- Children: 1
- Education: University of California, Irvine (BA); University of California, Hastings (JD); San Francisco State University (MSW); Brandeis University (PhD)
- Scientific career
- Fields: Law, social work, ethnic studies
- Thesis: The hearing and decision-making practices of Social Security administrative law judges (1994)

Linda Gayle Mills (born October 30, 1957) is an American social worker who has been serving as the 17th president of New York University since July 2023.

== Education ==
Mills received a B.A. with a major in history and social thought from the University of California, Irvine in 1979, a J.D. from the University of California, Hastings College of the Law in 1983, an M.S.W. from San Francisco State University in 1986, and a Ph.D. in health policy in 1994 from Brandeis University.

She was admitted to the State Bar of California in December 1983 and has held inactive status since January 2003. She became a licensed clinical social worker in 1990.

== Career ==
From 1994 to 1998, Mills was a lecturer at the UCLA School of Law and an assistant professor in the UCLA School of Public Policy and Social Research. In 2002, she was named vice provost (and in 2006 senior vice provost) for Undergraduate Education and University Life. She started as NYU's vice chancellor and senior vice provost for Global Programs and University Life in 2012.

Mills joined New York University (NYU) as an associate professor of social work in 1999, and was promoted to full professor in 2001. She is the Lisa Ellen Goldberg Professor of Social Work, Public Policy, and Law, and serves as executive director of the NYU Center on Violence and Recovery. Mills is the president of New York University, having succeeded Andrew D. Hamilton on July 1, 2023. She is the first Jewish person and first woman to serve as the university's president.

=== Research ===
Mills' principal areas of scholarly focus are trauma, bias, and domestic violence. She has written articles for publications including Harvard Law Review, Cornell Law Review, Journal of Experimental Criminology, and Nature: Human Behavior.

=== Books ===
Her books have been published by Princeton University Press, University of Michigan Press, Springer, and Basic Books.

=== Films ===
As a filmmaker, she has produced award-winning films that have debuted at Tribeca Film Festival and the Los Angeles Jewish Film Festival and have been shown in Abu Dhabi, Austria, and Tunisia, among other countries. Of Many: Then and Now has aired on ABC.
