= List of presidents of New York University =

Heads of New York University

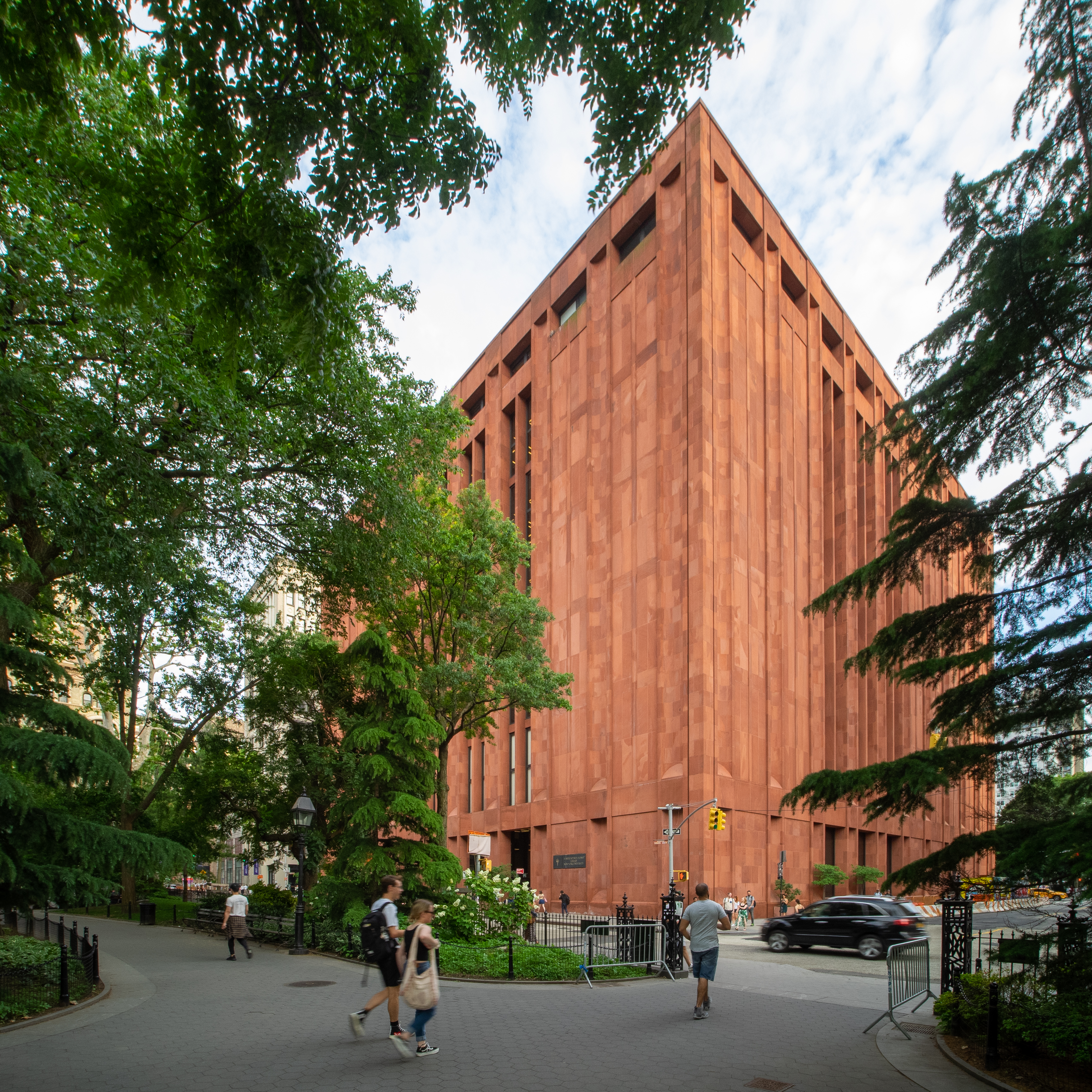
The office of the president is located in Bobst Library.

New York University (NYU) is a private research university located in New York City, which was founded by Albert Gallatin in 1831. The "president and chancellor", often shortened to president, is the highest authority in the university after the board of trustees, serving as its chief executive and chief academic officer. From the university's founding until June 1956, the position was simply titled "chancellor".

The president is elected by the board of trustees, and serves as an ex officio member of the board. The president recommends persons to fill the university's senior offices, including provost, executive vice president, general counsel, and deans, who are then appointed by the board. The president also presides over the university senate and confers all degrees, with the board's authorization and upon certification of a student by the faculty.

The president is provided a penthouse residence, which is owned by the university, on Washington Square Park. As of 2021, the president received over $1.5 million in annual compensation. The current president, Linda G. Mills, a social worker who is the university's first female president, assumed office on July 1, 2023.

== Presidents and chancellors ==
Presidents
No.	Image	Name	Term start	Term end	Ref.
1		James M. Matthews	1831	1839	
2	Portrait of Theodore Frelinghuysen	Theodore Frelinghuysen (Note: New Jersey Attorney General (1817–1828); United States Senator from New Jersey (1829–1835); Mayor of Newark (1837–1838); President of Rutgers College (1850–1862))	1839	1850 (Note: Resigned to head Rutgers College)	
3	Portrait of Isaac Ferris	Isaac Ferris (Note: Founder of the Rutgers Female Institute)	1853	1870	
4	Portrait of Howard Crosby	Howard Crosby (Note: Moderator of the General Assembly of the Presbyterian Church in the United States of America (1873–1874))	1870	1881	
5	Portrait of John Hall	John Hall	1881	1891	
6	Portrait of Henry MacCracken	Henry Mitchell MacCracken (Note: Chancellor of the Western University of Pennsylvania (1881–1884))	1891	1911	
7	Portrait of Elmer Ellsworth Brown	Elmer Ellsworth Brown (Note: United States Commissioner of Education (1906–1911))	1911	1933	
8	Portrait of Harry Woodburn Chase	Harry Woodburn Chase (Note: President of the University of North Carolina at Chapel Hill (1919–1930); President of the University of Illinois System (1930–1933))	1933	1951	
Acting		James Loomis Madden	1951	1952	
9		Henry Townley Heald (Note: President of the Illinois Institute of Technology (1940–1952); President of the Ford Foundation (1956–1965))	1952	1956 (Note: Resigned to head Ford Foundation.)	
10		Carroll Vincent Newsom	1956	1962	
11		James McNaughton Hester (Note: Provost of LIU Brooklyn (1957); Vice President of Long Island University (1958–1960); Dean of NYU College & Graduate School of Arts & Science (1960–1962); Rector of the United Nations University (1975–1980); President of the New York Botanical Garden (1980–1989); and President of the Harry Frank Guggenheim Foundation (1989–2004))	1962	1975	
12		John C. Sawhill (Note: Director of the Federal Energy Administration (1974); Deputy Secretary of Energy (1979–1980); CEO of the Synthetic Fuels Corporation (1980–1981); President of The Nature Conservancy (1990–2000))	1975	1980	
Acting		Ivan Loveridge Bennett (Note: Acting president. Dean of NYU School of Medicine and Provost of NYU Medical Center (1969–1981))	1980	1981	
13	Photograph of John Brademas	John Brademas (Note: United States Representative from Indiana (1959–1981); House Majority Whip (1977–1981))	July 1, 1981	November 20, 1991	
14		L. Jay Oliva	November 21, 1991	May 16, 2002	
15	Photograph of John Sexton	John Sexton (Note: Dean of NYU School of Law (1988–2002))	May 17, 2002	December 31, 2015	
16	Photograph of Andrew D. Hamilton	Andrew D. Hamilton (Note: Provost of Yale University (2004–2008); Vice-Chancellor of the University of Oxford (2009–2016))	January 1, 2016	June 30, 2023	
17	Portrait of Linda G. Mills	Linda G. Mills	July 1, 2023	present	

Table notes:

== See also ==
- History of New York University
- List of New York University faculty
