= Isaac Ferris =

American chancellor (1798–1873)

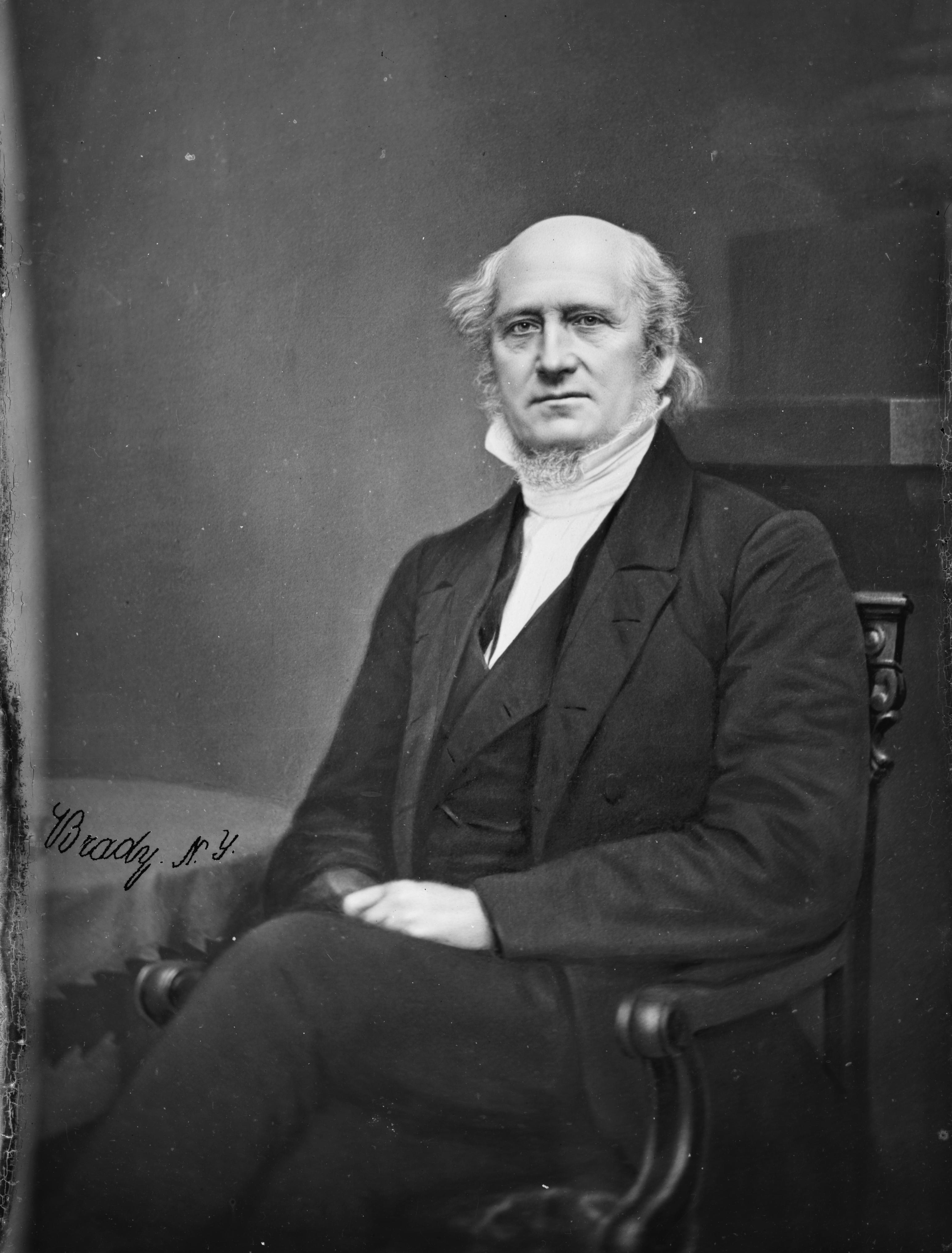

3rd Chancellor of New York University
- In office 1853–1870
- Preceded by: Theodore Frelinghuysen
- Succeeded by: Howard Crosby

Personal details
- Born: 9 October 1798 New York City
- Died: 16 June 1873 (aged 74) Roselle, New Jersey
- Education: Columbia University

Isaac Ferris (1798–1873) was a clergyman of the Reformed Church in America, and the third Chancellor of New York University.

Ferris graduated from Columbia College in 1816. He received a D.D. degree from Union College in 1833, and an L.L.D. from Columbia in 1853.

In 1820, he was appointed by the Board of Domestic Missions to labor in the Classis of Montgomery. He served in the Second Reformed Church of Albany, New York from 1824 to 1836 and was active in the Market Street Church in New York City from 1836 to 1853. He served as Chancellor of New York University from 1853 to 1870. During his tenure he brought financial stability to the university.

Ferris was also a founder of the Rutgers Female College, a member of the American Bible Society, founder of the YMCA of Greater New York.

Academic offices
Preceded by Theodore Frelinghuysen	Chancellor of New York University; 1853–1870	Succeeded by Howard Crosby
