= Andrew D. Hamilton =

British American chemist and academic administrator

Andrew Hamilton FRS
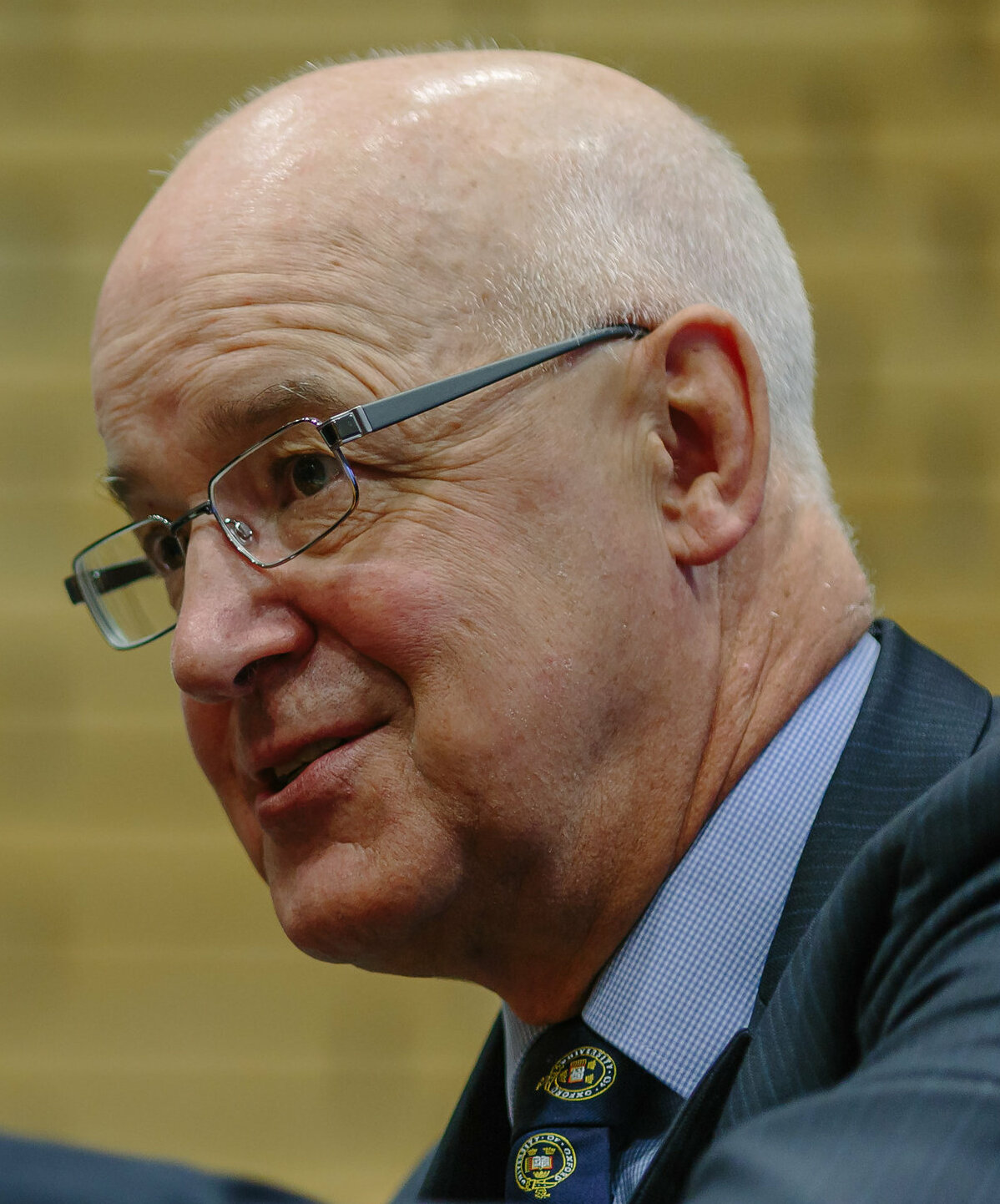
- Hamilton at the Water Security Conference (2015)

16th President of New York University
- In office 1 January 2016 – 1 July 2023
- Preceded by: John Sexton
- Succeeded by: Linda G. Mills

Vice-Chancellor of the University of Oxford
- In office 1 October 2009 – 31 December 2015
- Chancellor: Chris Patten
- Preceded by: John Hood
- Succeeded by: Louise Richardson

Provost of Yale University
- In office 1 October 2004 – 1 October 2008
- Preceded by: Susan Hockfield
- Succeeded by: Peter Salovey

Personal details
- Born: Andrew David Hamilton; 3 November 1952 (age 73)
- Spouse: Jennifer Letton
- Education: University of Exeter (BSc); University of British Columbia (MSc); St John's College, Cambridge (PhD)

Andrew David Hamilton FRS (born 3 November 1952) is a British-American chemist and academic administrator who served as the 16th president of New York University from 2016 to 2023. He previously served as vice chancellor of the University of Oxford from 2009 to 2015 and provost of Yale University from 2004 to 2008.

== Early life and education ==
Andrew Hamilton was born on 3 November 1952 in Guildford, Surrey, where he attended Royal Grammar School.

Hamilton received a first class Bachelor of Science with a major in chemistry from the University of Exeter in the United Kingdom in 1974, a Master of Science from the University of British Columbia in Canada in 1976, and a Doctor of Philosophy from the University of Cambridge (St John's College) in 1980.

He was a postdoctoral fellow at the Université Louis Pasteur in Strasbourg, France in 1981.

== Career ==
In 1981, he was appointed assistant professor of chemistry at Princeton University then in 1988 as professor of chemistry at the University of Pittsburgh. In 1997 he moved to Yale as Benjamin Silliman Professor of Chemistry and professor of molecular biophysics and biochemistry at Yale University. Hamilton's research has spanned porphyrin, supramolecular, medicinal, bioorganic chemistry and chemical biology. His laboratory is most noted for the design of barbiturate hosts, farnesyl transferase inhibitors, protein surface binders, and helix mimetics. In 2004 he was elected a Fellow of the Royal Society.

He also served as provost of Yale University from October 2004 to October 2008 after his predecessor, Susan Hockfield, was appointed the 16th president of the Massachusetts Institute of Technology. He had previously served as Deputy Provost for Science and Technology for one year under Hockfield, and as chairman of the department of chemistry at Yale.

On 3 June 2008, Oxford University announced Hamilton's nomination for the post of Vice-Chancellor. On 16 June, it was confirmed that he would succeed John Hood and assume the post for a period of seven years on 1 October 2009. He is an Honorary Fellow of Harris Manchester College and Wolfson College at Oxford.

He received honorary doctorates from the University of Surrey, Tsinghua University, and the University of Exeter, among others.

=== New York University ===
On 18 March 2015, New York University announced Hamilton's appointment to begin as the 16th President of the university. His duties began in January 2016. In his first year, the university paid him $1.8 million. On 13 April 2022, Hamilton announced his intention to step down as president of the university after the 2022–2023 school year.

== Personal life ==
Hamilton lives in a university-provided penthouse in Greenwich Village with his wife Jennifer. He has three children.

Academic offices
Preceded by John Hood	Vice-Chancellor of the University of Oxford; 2009–2015	Succeeded by Louise Richardson
Preceded by John Sexton	President of New York University; 2016–2023	Succeeded by Linda G. Mills
