= Howard Crosby (minister) =

American classical philologist and Presbyterian minister (1826–1891)

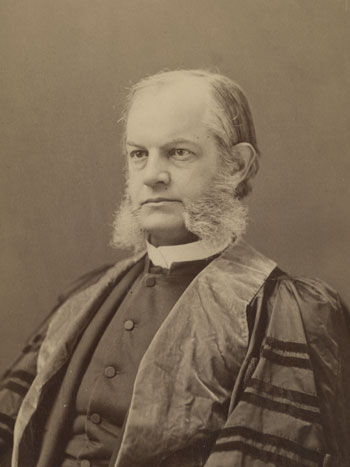

4th Chancellor of New York University
- In office 1870–1881
- Preceded by: Isaac Ferris
- Succeeded by: John Hall

Personal details
- Born: February 27, 1826 New York City, U.S.
- Died: March 29, 1891 (aged 65) New York City, U.S.
- Spouse: Margaret Evertson Givan
- Children: Ernest Howard Crosby

Howard Crosby (February 27, 1826 – March 29, 1891) was an American Presbyterian preacher, scholar and professor. He was Chancellor of New York University.

== Biography ==
Crosby was born in New York City in 1826 to William Bedlow Crosby and Harriet Ashton Clarkson. His ancestors included Judge Joseph Crosby of Massachusetts, Gen. William Floyd of New York, a signer of the U.S. Declaration of Independence, Rip Van Dam, and Matthias Nicoll. He is also the father of Ernest Howard Crosby, and a relative of Fanny Crosby.

Crosby graduated in 1844 from NYU where he was one of the founding fathers of the Gamma Chapter of the Delta Phi fraternity, and became professor of Greek at NYU in 1851. In 1859, he was appointed professor of Greek at Rutgers College, New Brunswick, New Jersey, where two years later he was ordained pastor of the First Presbyterian Church of New Brunswick. From 1863 until his death he was pastor of Fourth Avenue Presbyterian Church, New York.

From 1870 to 1881 Crosby was chancellor of New York University, then known as the University of the City of New York.

He was one of the American revisers of the English version of the New Testament. Crosby took a prominent part in politics. He urged to excise reform and opposed total abstinence. He was one of the founders and the first president of the New York Society for the Prevention of Crime, and pleaded for better management of Indian affairs and international copyright. Among his publications are The Lands of the Moslem (1851), Bible Companion (1870), Jesus: His Life and Works (1871), True Temperance Reform (1879), True Humanity of Christ (1880), and commentaries on the book of Joshua (1875), Nehemiah (1877) and the New Testament (1885).

He was also president of the American Philological Association and in 1871 gave a presidential address, excerpted in the Proceedings of the American Philological Association.

"Linguistics or philology may be considered either as a science or as a philosophy. Under the first aspect we may gain some idea of its extent by thinking of the vast number of languages which are to be investigated, not only those now spoken, but also many of which we have but the fossils. It touches here psychology and history, and enables us to know the unseen. A linguistic criticism is the source of all true commentary. By philology we can reconstruct prehistoric man, and read the history of times before the Olympiads and Nabonassar. Languages are never lost. By this science, the original unity of the human race is already nearly proved….Again philology as a philosophy speculates on the value of language to man, and its relations to his mind. These speculations are not to be confounded with the facts of the science….Every profound thinker has found himself fettered by language. Hence disputes and misunderstandings have arisen. Also in poetry, in devotion, in music, language is shown to be imperfect; it can never be made sufficient for the whole realm of thought. Man in his development, must have a nobler and fuller language than he has to-day. This may be in a new creation with spiritual bodies."

The President, in conclusion, referred to the field of American languages as especially open to the researches of the Association, suggesting its division into sections and the organization of local branches (Crosby 1871: 8, quotation marks in the original).

From 1872 to 1880 Crosby was a member of the New Testament Company of the American Revision Committee.

Crosby married Margaret Evertson Givan, a daughter of John Givan and Mary Ann Evertson, she a granddaughter of Jacob Evertson of Amenia, New York.

== Works ==
- The Lands of the Moslem (1851)
- A Bible Manual: intended to furnish a general view of the Holy Scriptures, as introductory to their study (1869)
- Bible Companion (1870)
- The Healthy Christian: An Appeal to the Church (1871)
- Jesus: His Life and Works (1871)
- Thoughts on the Decalogue (1873)
- The Bible on the Side of Science. A Lecture Delivered in New York (1875)
- Expository notes on the Book of Joshua (1875)
- The New Testament, with Brief Explanatory Notes Or Scholia
- The Book of Nehemiah (1877)
- True Temperance Reform (1879)
- The Christian Preacher (1880)
- The True Humanity of Christ (1880)
- Moderation vs. Total Abstinence
- The New Testament in both Authorized and Revised versions (1884)
- The Bible view of the Jewish church, in Thirteen Lectures (1888)

Academic offices
Preceded by Isaac Ferris	Chancellor of New York University; 1870–1881	Succeeded by John Hall
Religious titles
Preceded by The Rev. Samuel J. Niccolls	Moderator of the 85th General Assembly of the Presbyterian Church in the United States of America; 1873–1874	Succeeded by The Rev. Samuel J. Wilson
