= Carroll Vincent Newsom =

American educator

10th President of New York University
- In office 1956–1962
- Preceded by: Henry Townley Heald
- Succeeded by: James McNaughton Hester

Personal details
- Born: February 23, 1904 Buckley, Illinois, U.S.
- Died: February 3, 1990 (aged 85) Dublin, Ohio, U.S.
- Education: College of Emporia (BA); University of Michigan (MA, PhD)

Carroll Vincent Newsom (February 23, 1904 - February 3, 1990) was an American educator who served as the tenth NYU president and president of Prentice Hall.

Newsom was born February 23, 1904, in Buckley, Illinois. He received a B.A. from the College of Emporia in 1924, a M.A. from the University of Michigan in 1927 and a Doctor of Philosophy in 1931.

He commenced his academic career in 1924 as a mathematics instructor at the College of Emporia. In 1927–1928 he taught at the University of Michigan and at the University of New Mexico in 1928–1929. He was appointed assistant professor in 1929, an associate professor in 1931, and professor in 1933, and served as head of the department from 1931 to 1944. He was professor of mathematics and chairman of the science division at Oberlin College from 1944 to 1948.

From 1948 to 1950, he was Assistant Commissioner for Higher Education, then Associate Commissioner for Higher and Professional Education, for the New York State. Newsom was appointed executive vice president in 1955 at New York University and served as 10th NYU president from 1956 to 1962. He was president of Prentice Hall from 1964 to 1965 and director of NBC from 1961 to 1971, serving as vice president from 1966 to 1969. He served on many other boards of directors and committees, listed below.

Newsom married and had three children. His wife, Frances Jeanne Higley, died June 3, 1989, in Dublin, OH. Newsom died February 3, 1990, in Dublin.

== Memberships and other positions ==
- Mathematical Association of America; member 1925–1990; 3 terms on board of governors; president, Southwestern Division 1938–1939
- American Association for the Advancement of Science; member 1931–1990; Fellow 1939–1990; president of Southwest Division 1939–1940; Member National Council 1940–1942
- American Society for Engineering Education; member 1938–1963; chairman, Math Division 1954
- Member, board of directors, Phelps-Stokes Fund 1956–1965
- Member, New York Academy of Public Education 1957–1959
- Founder of the Courant Institute for the Mathematical Sciences. Raised the money to build a 13-story building to house the members of the staff and their research activities 1958
- Member, board of directors, New York World's Fair 1964–1965 Corporation 1959–1972
- Vice President and trustee, Thomas Alva Edison Foundation 1960–1970
- Vice President, Phi Beta Kappa Association 1961
- Chairman of the board, Laboratory for Educational Materials, Inc. 1961–1965
- Member, Board of Design, Sterling Forest Corporation, Inc. 1961–1966
- Member, board of trustees, New College, Sarasota, Florida 1961–1966
- Member, board of directors, National Broadcasting Company, Inc. 1961–1969
- Member, board of trustees, Ithaca College 1961–1975; chairman, executive committee 1966; chairman of the board 1967–1970; honorary trustee 1975–1990
- Member, board of trustees, Mills College of Education 1962–1964
- Member, Council of American Geographical Society 1962–1965
- Member, board of trustees, Franklin Book Programs 1962–1967; vice chairman 1965
- Member, board of trustees, Briarcliff College 1962–1967
- Chairman, governor's Committee on New Jersey Higher Education 1963–1964
- Member, board of directors, The American Academy of Political and Social Science 1963–1965
- Chairman of the board, New York Institute of Finance 1963–1965
- Member, Harvard Visiting Committee for Biology 1963–1970
- Member, board of trustees, Guggenheim Foundation 1963–1977; chairman 1975–1977
- Member, board of directors, African-American Chamber of Commerce 1964–1969
- Member, board of directors, M. Lowenstein and Sons 1965–1973
- Member, board of directors, Random House, Inc. 1966–1970; chairman, executive committee 1967–1969
- Member, board of directors, The L. W. Singer Company, Inc. 1967–1970
- Member, education committee, U.S. Chamber of Commerce 1967–1970
- Member, Computer Science Advisory Committee, Stanford University 1967–1971
- Member, governor's Commission on Public Broadcasting in New Jersey 1968
- Member, board of managers, the Franklin Institute 1968–1971
- Member, board of trustees, Dropsie University, 1970–1975
- Member, board of directors, National Association of Educational Broadcasters 1970–1975
- Chairman, Phi Beta Kappa Bicentennial Fellows 1976
- Member, Finance and investment committee, Hamilton Trust Fund 1933–1938
- Fellow, Cooperative Study in General Education 1939
- Chairman, Seminar on College Mathematics Teaching, University of Chicago 1939–1940
- Member, War Policy Committee of Mathematicians 1939–1942
- Educational Consultant, Rinehart Publishing Company 1945–1949
- Chairman, section on Teaching and History of Mathematics, International Congress of Mathematicians 1950
- American Council of education committee on TV 1952–1956
- Member, Joint Council on Educational TV 1952–1956
- Member, National Commission on Standards of Education and Experience for CPAs 1954–1956
- Chairman of the committee that created Educational TV, later to be renamed Public TV
- Member, Council of College of Home Economics of Cornell University 1955–1958
- Board Member, Metropolitan Educational TV Association, Inc. 1955–1959; chairman 1955–1958
- Member, board of trustees, New York University 1955–1962
- Board Member, International House of New York 1956–1962
- Charter Member, National Honorary Advisory Council for Institute of Latin American Studies 1957
- Chairman of the board, Town Hall, Inc. 1957–1958
- Member, New York Chamber of Commerce 1957–1961
- Member, board of trustees, Grant Monument Association 1957–1970
- Council of Higher Educational Institutions in New York City 1958–1960; president 1958–1960
- Chairman, AAU Committee on Urban Renewal 1958–1960
- Member of board of governors of the Hundred Year Association of New York, Inc. 1958–1961
- Member, National Commission on Accrediting 1958–1961
- State Advisory Council on Higher Education of University of State of New York 1958–1962
- Member, Schools and College Committee of United Negro College Fund, Inc. 1958–1962
- Co-chairman of Paderewsky Centennial Committee for 1960 1959
- Chairman, New York Committee for the Selection of Rhodes Scholars 1959–1962
- Member, American Council on Relationships of Higher Education to Federal Government 1960–1961
- Member, advisory council for Advancement of Scientific Research and Development in New York State 1960–1962
- Member, advisory committee for the National Defense Counseling and Guidance Institute Program, U. S. Government 1960–1964
- Member, board of directors, American Arbitration Association 1960–1964
- Member, board of trustees, National Fund for Graduate Nursing Education 1960–1964
- Board Member, First Annual International Assembly of TV Arts and Science 1961
- Association of colleges and Universities of State of New York; president 1961–1962; vice-president 1959–1960
- Member, board of trustees, New York Institute of Technology 1962–1967
- Member, advisory council of the Seven College Vocational Workshops 1963–1964
- Member, New York State Commission on Telecommunications 1972–1974

== Select publications ==
- An Introduction to Mathematics: A Study of the Nature of Mathematics, University of New Mexico Press, 1936.
- An Introduction to Mathematics for College Students, University of New Mexico Press, 1939.
- An American Philosophy of Education, Van Nostrand, 1942.
- A Manual of Mathematics for Prospective Air Corps Cadets, Prentice-Hall (Englewood Cliffs, NJ), 1942.
- Basic Mathematics for Pilots and Flight Crews, Prentice-Hall, 1943.
- An Introduction to College Mathematics, Prentice-Hall, 1946, revised edition, 1954.
- Foundations and Fundamental Concepts of Mathematics, Rinehart, 1958, revised edition, 1965.
- Mathematical Discourses: The Heart of Mathematical Science, Prentice-Hall, 1964.
- The Roots of Christianity, Prentice-Hall, 1979.
- Problems Are for Solving: An Autobiography, Dorrance (Bryn Mawr, PA), 1983.

Academic offices
Preceded by Henry Townley Heald	President of New York University; 1956–1962	Succeeded by James McNaughton Hester
