= John Hall (Presbyterian pastor) =

Presbyterian pastor (1829–1898)

The Reverend John Hall
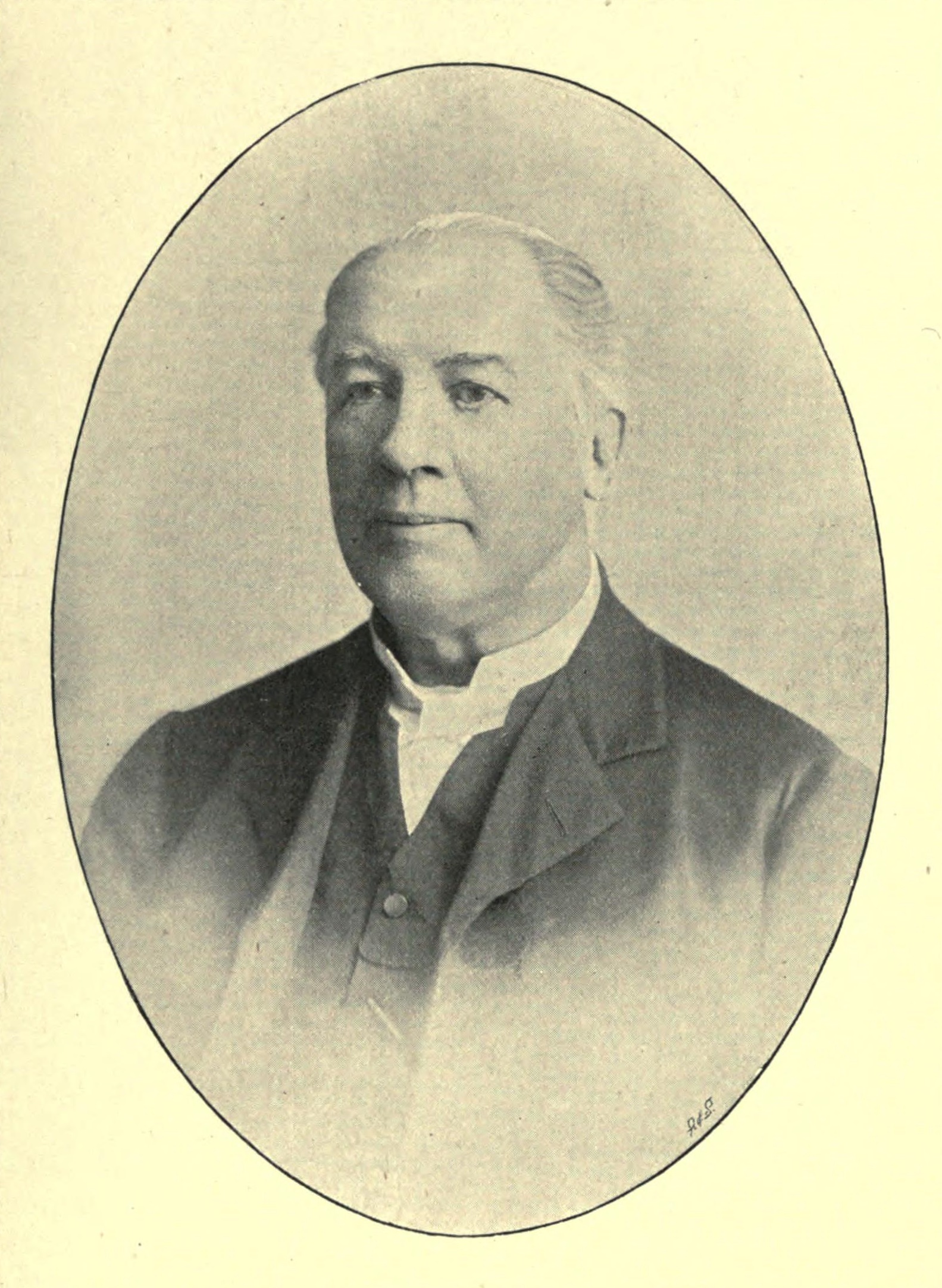
- John Hall, by Abernethy

5th Chancellor of New York University
- In office 1881–1891
- Preceded by: Howard Crosby
- Succeeded by: Henry MacCracken

Personal details
- Born: July 31, 1829 County Armagh, Ireland
- Died: September 17, 1898 (aged 69) Bangor, County Down, Ireland
- Spouse: Emily Bolton (m. 1852)
- Children: 5, including Bolton and Thomas
- Education: Belfast College
- Occupation: Clergyman

Dr. John Hall (1829–1898) was the Irish-born American pastor of the Fifth Avenue Presbyterian Church, New York City, from 1867 until his death in Bangor, County Down, Ireland. The landmark New York church, that still stands today on Fifth Avenue at 55th Street, was built during his tenure.

== Education and training ==
John Hall was born in Ballygorman, County Armagh, Ireland on July 31, 1829. His was the eldest son of William Hall and Rachel McGowan – descendants of Scottish Presbyterians. His education began in a local school before he attended Belfast College in 1841. In 1845 he entered theological college under Dr. John Edgar and Dr Henry Cooke. In 1848 his father died; despite financial hardships his mother insisted he complete his religious studies and in 1850 he was ordained a Presbyterian missionary. During his time at college, Hall supplemented his income by teaching at a girls' school.

== Early missionary work ==
From 1849 he spent three years as a student missionary in Connaught, a west coast province of Ireland that had been badly affected by both the Great Famine and the fever; small tenant farmers were being evicted by landlords and many of the young men were emigrating to escape the deprivation and poverty. The area was predominantly Catholic, and the local priests mistrusted the Presbyterian missionaries and questioned their motives. Hall's work included school inspections, preaching, distributing religious literature and establishing Sunday-schools. One scheme involved creating industrial schools where women could be taught new skills such as knitting and needlework. Much of the effort was non-denominational, with financial contributions from Methodists, Episcopalians, Quakers and Catholic teaching staff. During this period Hall started writing poems and articles for weekly newspapers, a practise that he continued for many years.

== Marriage ==
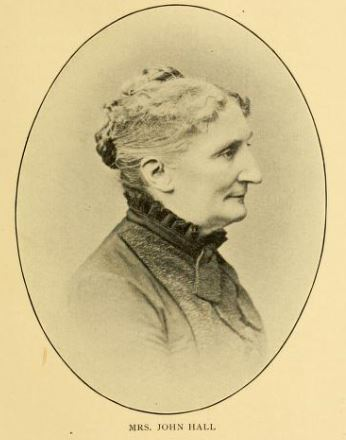
Emily (Bolton) Irwin, wife of Rev. Dr John Hall

As a missionary, Hall travelled over a wide area, working long hours, and his health suffered as a consequence. One of the ladies who established a school in the district was Mrs Emily (Bolton) Irwin (1816–1904), a widow with three children. Hall boarded with her relatives, and they nursed him back to health. A friendship developed between Emily Irwin and Hall and they eventually married in 1852.

== Armagh ==
Hall's work as a missionary came to the notice of the congregation of the First Church in Armagh; they invited him to be their pastor, and he was installed in June 1852. The southern and western areas of County Armagh had suffered in the Great Famine, but the worst was over by the time Hall arrived. He travelled extensively, holding prayer meetings and sermons in remote locations, gradually increasing the size of his congregation. In 1855 he put his experience of journalism to good use, editing the Children's Missionary Herald of the Presbyterian Church in Ireland. He continued this for five years, passing the responsibility for the publication to his colleague, Matthew Kerr, in 1860. He was also involved with the temperance movement, speaking and writing on the subject. All but one of his five children were born during his tenure at Armagh. (see Family)

== Mary's Abbey, Dublin ==
In 1858 Hall became the associate pastor in Mary's Abbey, Dublin, joining Dr William B. Kirkpatrick. In 1861 he was appointed to the Commissioners of National Education (Ireland), a secular government committee. From about 1862 he edited a monthly magazine called the Evangelical Witness; this featured contributions from leading churchmen, and it became an influential publication. In 1862 wine merchant Alexander Findlater provided a site in Rutland Square (now Parnell Square) plus the funding for a new Presbyterian church in Dublin. One condition was that John Hall be appointed as the head of the project committee. The new Mary's Abbey was opened in 1864. In 1865 Hall became a Doctor of Divinity when he was awarded an honorary degree by the American University of Washington and Jefferson; in later years he received further degrees from Columbia University and Trinity College Dublin. During his time in Dublin, Hall was the chaplain at Mountjoy Female prison. He also devoted time to the various institutes for the orphans, the deaf and the blind.

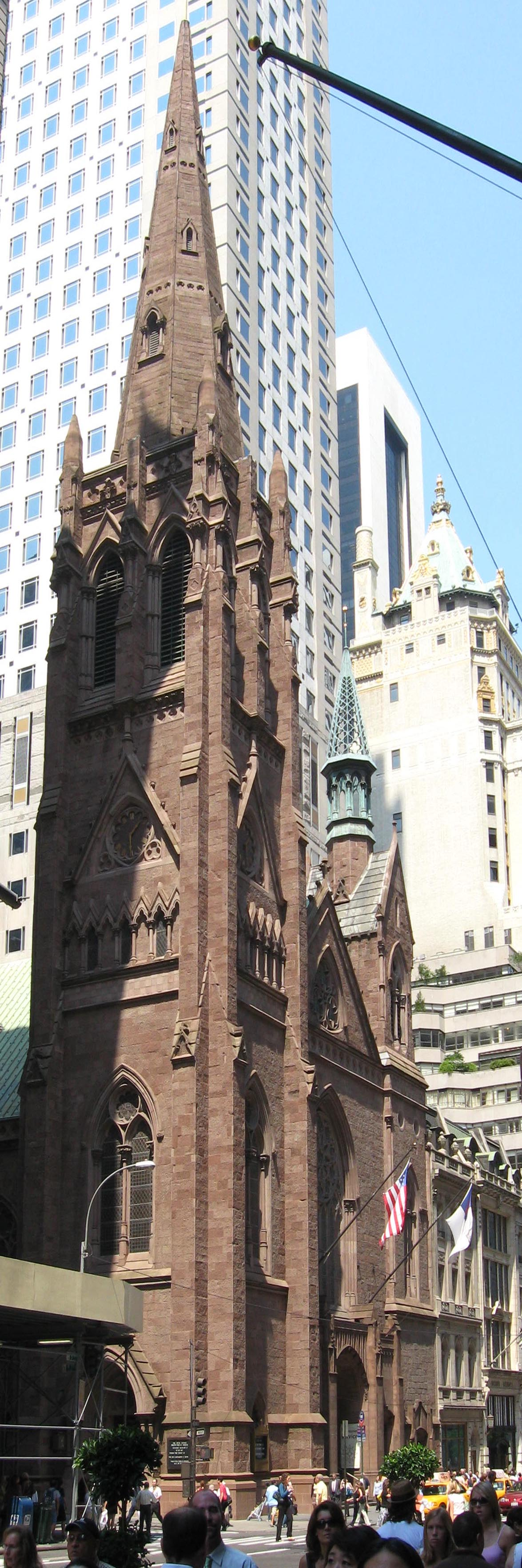
Fifth Avenue Presbyterian Church

== America ==
In 1867 Hall attended the General Assembly of the Presbyterian Church in the United States of America with the Rev. Dr. James Denham of Derry. Hall spent about eight weeks in America, and during that time he gave talks and preached in several churches, including the Fifth Avenue Presbyterian Church in New York, where a vacancy existed for a new pastor. He was offered the job and accepted, moving his family from Dublin to New York later that year. His initial salary was $6000 in gold and this was subsequently increased to $15,000.

== Building a new church ==
By 1872 the Fifth Avenue church on the corner of 19th Street was no longer large enough to accommodate the growing congregation, and plans were made to build a new one further up-town. Newspaperman Robert E. Bonner identified a site on Fifth Avenue and Fifty-Fifth Street and made a large financial contribution towards the construction costs. The new church was opened in 1875. Hall's fears that the Church would be debt-burdened were not realised when other wealthy members made large contributions. Another fundraising scheme was the "sale" of the pews in the new church. Among the parishioners was the family of Theodore Roosevelt; Hall presided over the double funeral of Roosevelt's first wife, Alice Hathaway Lee Roosevelt, and his mother, Martha Bulloch Roosevelt, on February 17, 1884 at the church.

== Outside interests ==
Despite his heavy workload, Hall was involved with several activities outside the Fifth Avenue Church, these included being the chancellor of the University of New York – a post he held for ten years; he was a trustee for the Princeton Theological Seminary and the Wellesley College plus chairman of the Presbyterian Board of Home Missions and member of the Board of Church Erection. Hall was also a director of the Union Theological Seminary of New York. In 1891 a dispute arose between the seminary and The General Assembly of the Presbyterian Church over the appointment of Charles Augustus Briggs, who was later accused of heresy. This caused a split between the two organisations, and because of this Hall resigned from the seminary.

== Shooting ==
On November 29, 1891, a man fired three shots at Hall after he had left the church and was entering his parsonage next door. They missed their target, and the man, a 47-year-old German, John George Roth, was apprehended. He had formerly been in an asylum and became angry with Hall after he failed to get a reply to letters that he had sent him. Hall said that the man had occasionally attended church and that he had tried to help him.

== Hermann Warszawiak ==
In 1892 a Polish Jew named Hermann Warszawiak arrived in New York from Scotland with letters of introduction to Hall. Warszawiak, who had initially trained to be a religious leader in the Jewish faith, had been christened by Scottish missionary Daniel Edwards in 1889. After theological studies in Edinburgh, he moved to New York and proposed to become a Presbyterian missionary to the Jews in the city. He joined the Fifth Avenue Presbyterian Church and received support for his work from the New York City Mission and Tract Society. After several successful years, he came into conflict with the leaders of the mission, who felt that he had become unmanageable. This escalated even further when he made a request to the Fifth Avenue Church to be ordained. A committee appointed to review his suitability rejected his application and questioned his integrity; a senior member of the church even employed a private detective to follow and report on his activities. Hall supported Warszawiak and considered he was being victimised, as did others in the church. Eventually Warszawiak was cleared of wrongdoing, but a damaging split had occurred within the church. Many of Hall's supporters from the early days had died or been replaced by this period. The board of trustees felt that it was time for a change and forced Hall into a position where he felt he had to resign. However, a backlash from within the church reversed the decisions; Hall was reinstated and six members of the board of trustees resigned instead.

== Final days ==
In 1898 Hall began to struggle with his health and he was advised to visit England to seek some rest. He stayed at Buxton and, perhaps feeling the end was near, returned to Ireland to see his sisters. He managed to make it to Dublin and visited his old church in Rutland Square. He wanted to get to his old home in Ballygorman but was too weak and died in Bangor on September 17. His body was returned to New York and the funeral service held in the Fifth Avenue Presbyterian Church on October 4, 1898.

== Family ==
Emily and John Hall had five children; they were:

- Professor Robert William Hall (1854–1934), fellow executor of John Hall's will.
- Bolton Hall (1854–1938), who founded the back-to-the-land movement.
- Dr. Richard John Hall (1856–1897), surgeon.
- Rev. Dr. Thomas Cuming Hall (1858–1936)
- Emily Charlotte Hall (1860–1936) married Dr. William Efner Wheelock, physician.

Hall's wife Emily had three sons from her first marriage to John Irwin (1800–1842), they were:

- Major John Irwin (1838–1901) who served with the 88th Regiment of Foot (Connaught Rangers) in Crimean War and Indian Rebellion of 1857.
- Lyndon Bolton Irwin (1840–1877)
- William Irwin (1842–1902) New York lawyer. He was an elder in the Fifth Avenue Presbyterian Church, Secretary of the Park Department and fellow executor of John Hall's will.

Academic offices
Preceded by Howard Crosby	Chancellor of New York University; 1881–1891	Succeeded by Henry Mitchell MacCracken
