= Henry Townley Heald =

American university president

9th President of New York University
- In office 1952–1956
- Preceded by: Harry Woodburn Chase
- Succeeded by: Carroll Vincent Newsom

President of the Illinois Institute of Technology
- In office 1937–1952
- Preceded by: Clarence Clarke
- Succeeded by: John Rettaliata

Henry Townley Heald (1904–1975) was the first president of Illinois Institute of Technology and the Ford Foundation.

== Career ==
Heald was president of Armour Institute of Technology from 1937 to 1940, at which time it became the Illinois Institute of Technology (IIT); he served as its president until 1952. He is credited with bringing architect Ludwig Mies van der Rohe to Chicago in 1938 to direct IIT's architecture program. He led a team that investigated the idea of a research institute on the west coast and made proposals that would result in the creation of SRI International.

He left IIT in 1952 to become president of New York University. In 1956 he became the president of the Ford Foundation, where he served until 1965.

== Honors and legacy ==
He appeared on the cover of Time in 1957. In 1959, Heald was awarded the Hoover Medal, which recognizes civic and humanitarian achievements by engineers. A scholarship at IIT is named after him.

Academic offices
Preceded by Clarence L. Clarke	President of the Illinois Institute of Technology; 1937–1952	Succeeded by John Rettaliata
Preceded by Harry Woodburn Chase	President of New York University; 1952–1956	Succeeded by Carroll Vincent Newsom
