= Harry Woodburn Chase =

American academic administrator (1883–1955)

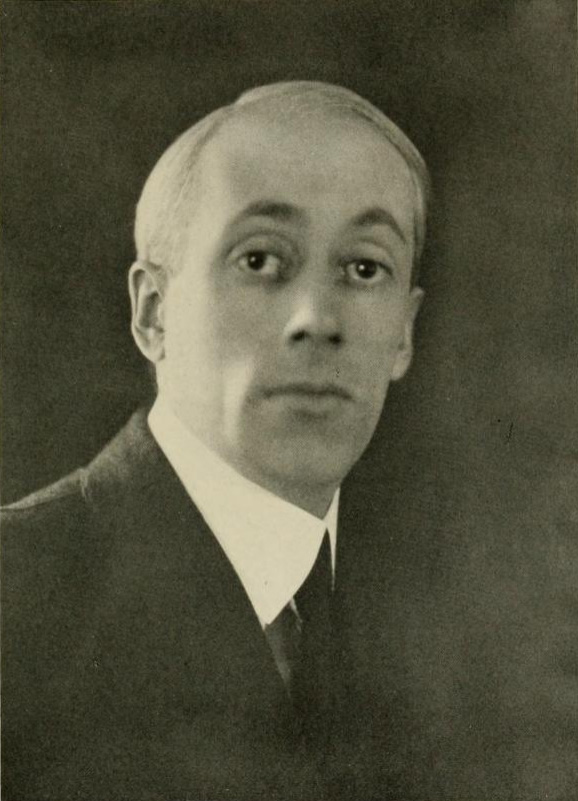
- Chase pictured in Yackety Yack 1922, UNC yearbook

12th President of the University of North Carolina
- In office 1919–1930
- Preceded by: Marvin Hendrix Stacy
- Succeeded by: Frank Porter Graham

7th President of the University of Illinois system
- In office 1930–1933
- Preceded by: David Kinley
- Succeeded by: Arthur H. Daniels

8th President of New York University
- In office 1933–1951
- Preceded by: Elmer Ellsworth Brown
- Succeeded by: Henry Townley Heald

Personal details
- Born: April 11, 1883 Groveland, Massachusetts, U.S.
- Died: April 20, 1955 (aged 72) Florida, U.S.

Harry Woodburn Chase (April 11, 1883 – April 20, 1955) was the 12th President of the University of North Carolina (1919–1930), the 7th President of the University of Illinois (1930–1933), and the 8th President of New York University (1933–1951).

Academic offices
Preceded by Elmer Ellsworth Brown	Chancellor of New York University; 1933–1951	Succeeded by Henry Townley Heald
Preceded by Marvin Hendrix Stacy	President of the University of North Carolina; 1919–1930	Succeeded by Frank Porter Graham
