= Hermann Warszawiak =

Polish Jew who became a Presbyterian missionary

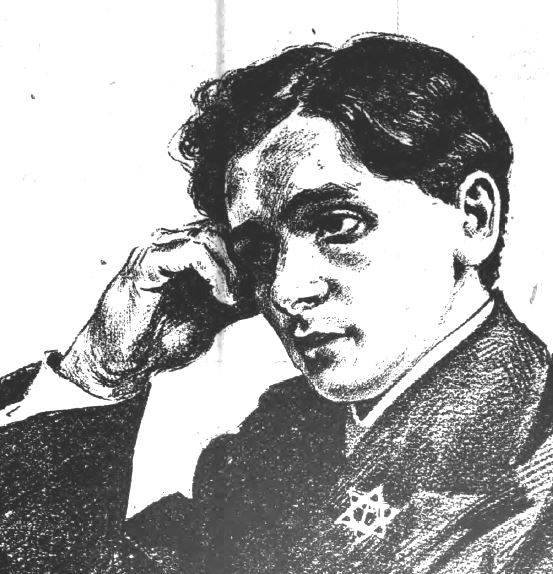
Hermann Warszawiak

Hermann Warszawiak (1865–1921) was a Polish Jew who became a Presbyterian missionary in New York.

== Biography ==
He was born in March, 1865 in Warsaw, Poland. His father was a merchant who was the son of a rabbi. Two of Hermann's brothers were also rabbis, and his inclination was to join them as a spiritual leader. During his studies he became aware of the Christian worship of Jesus and in 1889 he attended a sermon in Breslau given by the Scottish missionary, Daniel Edwards. Over the next months Edwards mentored Warszawiak whilst he studied the Scriptures. He eventually took the decision to be baptised into the Christian faith and this occurred on October 6, 1889.

There was shock and anger in the Jewish community and in Warszawiak's family at this news. For his own safety he was moved to Scotland, leaving behind his wife and two children. He continued his studies and trained with the Free Church of Scotland in the New College, Edinburgh. However, before he could be ordained he was moved, this time to New York because of the continued concerns for his safety. He carried letters of introduction, including one to the Rev. John Hall, the veteran pastor of the Fifth Avenue Presbyterian Church. Very soon, Warszawiak joined this church and started preaching at Rev, Jacob Freshman's Hebrew Christian Church, St Mark's Place. Later he used the De Witt Memorial Hall, with support from the New York City Mission and Tract Society.

Warszawiak worked in the Jewish quarter in Lower East Side Manhattan, where many of the refugees from Europe had settled. He was an experienced preacher and could hold the attention of a large audience. His meetings were often so well attended that many could not get in to hear him. Some of his critics complained that he was using inducements to swell the numbers, advertising free electric picture shows to those who attended. He started to expand his horizons and formed the American Mission to the Jews, breaking away from the New York City Mission. He also opened a shelter for persecuted Christian Jews and planned to build a church. Funding came from supporters in America and Scotland including a lady called Miss Catherine Douglas (Note: Catherine Grace Douglas (1828-1898) was the daughter of Lord William Robert Keith Douglas) who sponsored an early biography of Warszawiak titled The Little Messianic Prophet, published in 1892. (Note: Hermann Warszawiak referred to as The Little Messianic Prophet due to his small stature; according to his passport application he was 5 feet 2 inches in height) She also forwarded a sum of money to help him in his work. He did not declare this to the head of the Mission, Rev. Dr. A. F. Schauffler, and this soured the relationship between the two men.

Large amounts of the money that had been given to Warszawick by donors for his missionary work could not be accounted for and in 1898 he was forced into bankruptcy. One of his largest creditors, Anninka Nicolas, lost about $26,000 and refused to release him from his bankruptcy; she was still pursuing him through the courts up till her death in 1913.

Warszawiak applied to the Fifth Avenue Presbyterian Church to be ordained and this was supported by the Pastor of the church, Dr John Hall. A committee appointed to review his application rejected his request, saying that he recognised no authority but that of God, and that there were questions over his honesty and financial probity. To back up their case, a senior member of the church employed a private detective who stated that Warszawiak had attended a gambling establishment. The church focussed on these accusations and Warszawiak was put on trial; the case initially went against him, but on appeal, the General Assembly refused to uphold the verdict. An independent inquiry also found in Warszawiak's favour.

Although Warszawiak's name had been cleared he found it difficult to continue his association with the Fifth Avenue Church. For a few years he operated independently, then became a member of the Christian Catholic Apostolic Church of John Alexander Dowie, but was dismissed in 1904. He eventually ceased his missionary work. In about 1910 he was associated with a broker called William T. Wintemute, who was selling fraudulent gold mine shares, but it was not clear if Warszawiak was aware of the criminal aspect of this business. Warszawiak changed the family name to Warwick whilst in England in about 1907. (Note: Detail recorded on WWI Draft Registration Card of his eldest son dated 1917.) He died November 25, 1921, in a 174th Street tenement block, Manhattan, and was buried in Woodlawn Cemetery.
