= Thomas Oliphant (journalist) =

American journalist

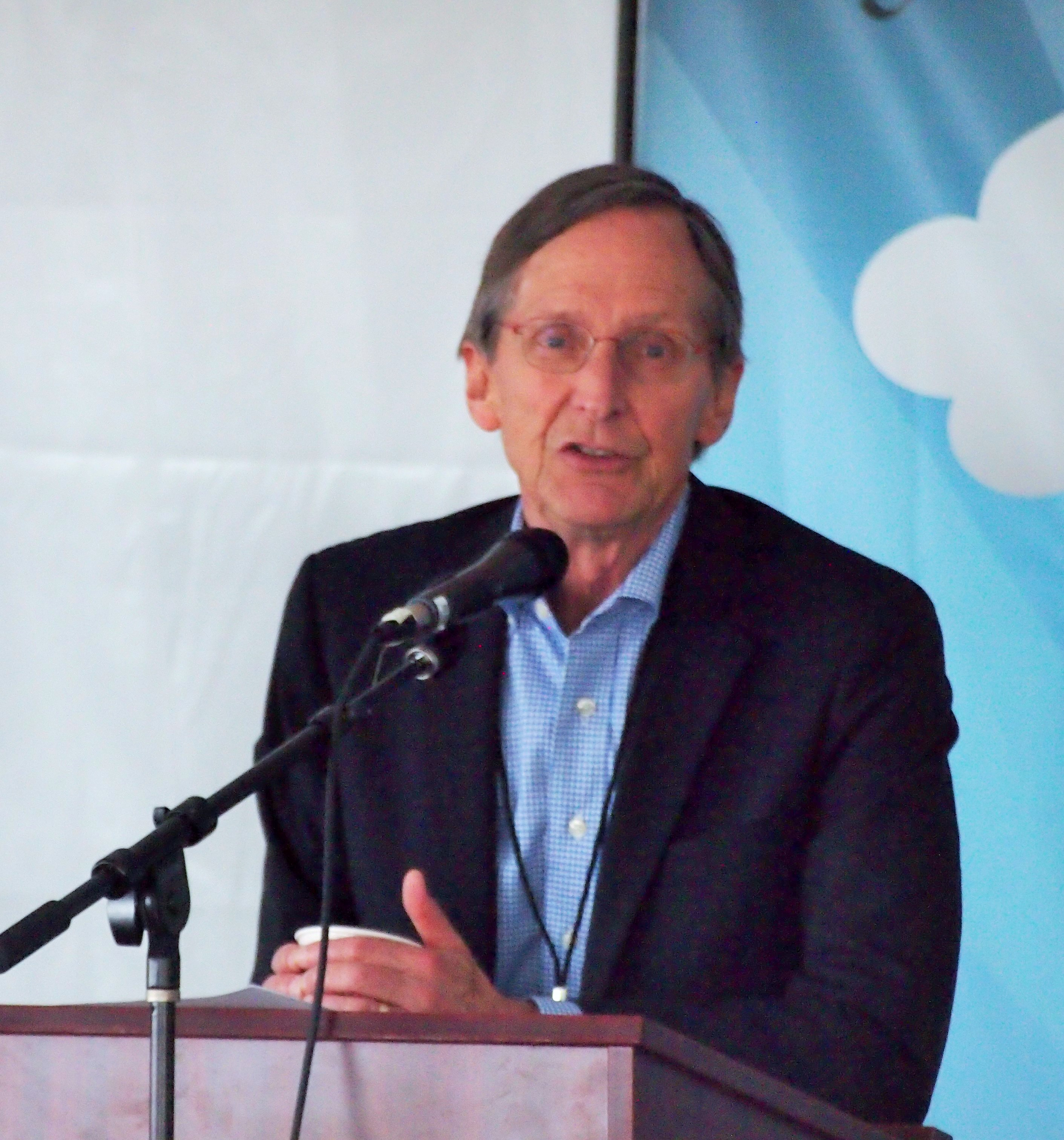
- Oliphant in 2017
- Born: Brooklyn, New York
- Education: Harvard University
- Occupation: former columnist for the Boston Globe
- Notable credit: American Society of Newspaper Editors Award
- Spouse: Susan Spencer

Thomas Oliphant is an American journalist who was the Washington correspondent and a columnist for The Boston Globe.

== Life and career ==
Oliphant was born in Brooklyn, New York. He graduated from La Jolla High School in California and in 1967 from Harvard University.

In 1968, he joined the Boston Globe. During his career with the newspaper, he served as its Washington correspondent and reported on ten Presidential campaigns. The Boys on the Bus, Timothy Crouse's account of the 1972 United States presidential campaign, included Oliphant as one of the prominent journalists among "the boys" covering the campaign.

Oliphant was one of three editors who managed The Globe's coverage of school desegregation in Boston, work which won a 1975 Pulitzer Prize, and he was a finalist in 1980 in the category of Editorial Writing. He also received a writing award from the American Society of Newspaper Editors.

In March 2005, Oliphant suffered a brain aneurysm. His account of the experience and his recovery appeared in The Globe on June 5, 2005. At the end of 2005, he was one of 32 Globe staff members who accepted a retirement buyout package from the New York Times Company, the owner of The Globe.

Oliphant has been a frequent guest on television news programs, including Nightline on ABC-TV, The NewsHour with Jim Lehrer on PBS, Face The Nation, the Today show, Good Morning America and CBS This Morning. His last appearance on Jim Lehrer's program was on Wednesday, August 26, 2009, when he discussed the legacy of Ted Kennedy. Oliphant was also a regular guest on The Al Franken Show, where he appeared as a guest host in August 2006.

Oliphant is married to CBS reporter Susan Spencer.

== Don Imus controversy ==
In April 2007, Oliphant became involved in controversy arising from some vulgar remarks that talk radio host Don Imus made regarding African American players on the Rutgers University women's basketball team. On April 9, 2007, Oliphant was a guest on the Imus' morning radio show in the midst of the developing controversy. Imus had apologized for his comment before that show, and Oliphant explained his decision to appear on the show to the New York Times, saying "He said he screwed up and he was sorry." On that evening's NewsHour with Jim Lehrer, Oliphant was critical of Imus' remarks, calling them "inexcusably horrible", but said, "I don't think he should be fired."

== Books ==
- (co-author with Curtis Wilkie) The Road to Camelot: Inside JFK's Five-year Campaign (May 9, 2017) ISBN 9781501105562
- (co-author) Baseball as a Road to God: Seeing Beyond the Game, (2013) ISBN 978-1-592-40754-5
- Utter Incompetents. Ego and Ideology in the Age of Bush, (2007) Thomas Dunne Books. ISBN 0312360177
- Praying for Gil Hodges : A Memoir of the 1955 World Series and One Family's Love of the Brooklyn Dodgers, (2005) ISBN 0-312-31761-1
- (co-author) All by Myself: The Unmaking of a Presidential Campaign, (1989) ISBN 0-87106-547-9
