= Executive Chamber of Andrew Cuomo =

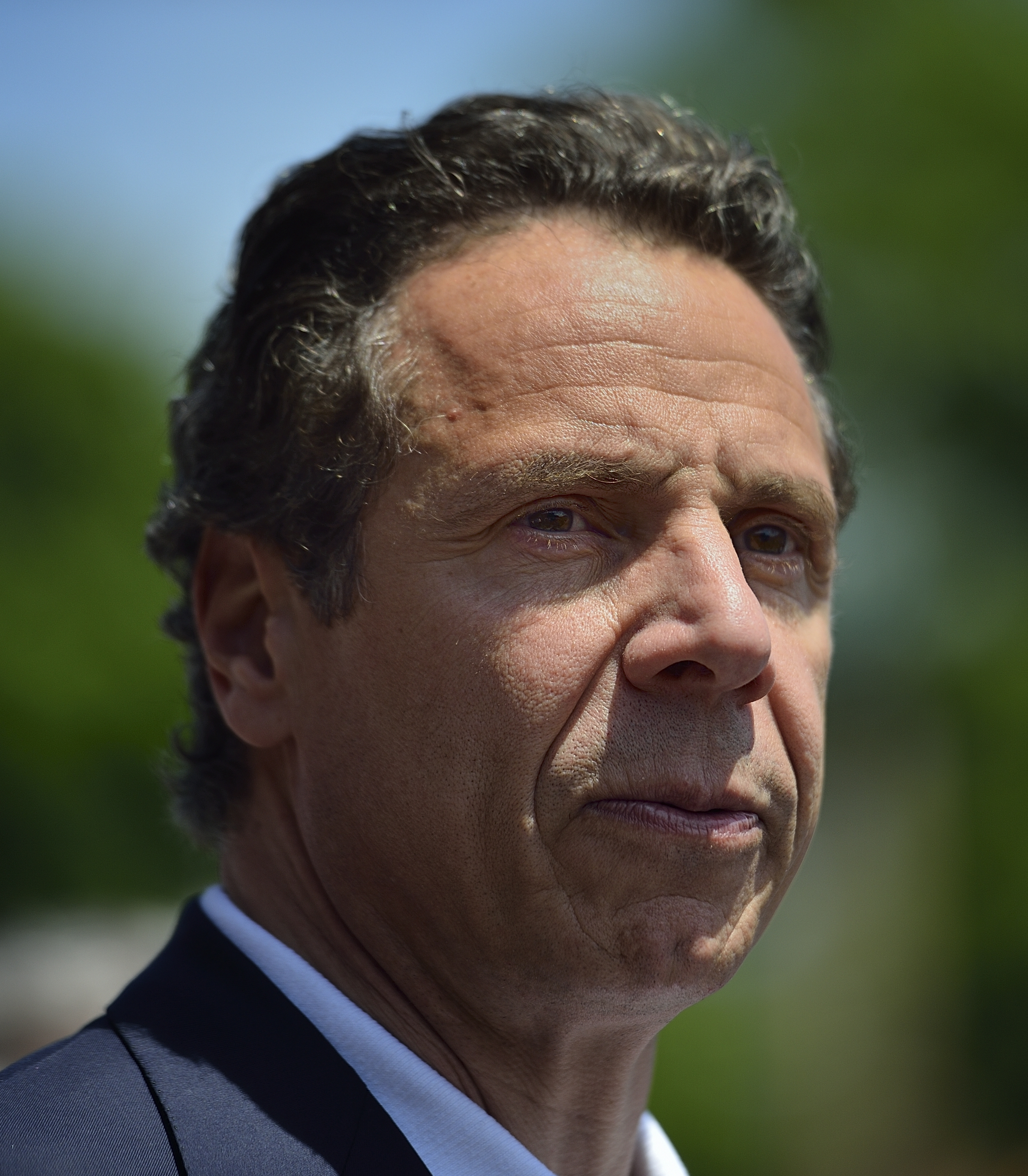
Governor Andrew Cuomo

The cabinet of Governor of New York Andrew Cuomo consisted of the executive chamber and the heads of the various departments of the Government of New York. Cuomo took office on January 1, 2011, as the 56th governor of New York.

== Executive Chamber ==
The following people have been appointed for the respective positions.

- Secretary to the Governor: Melissa DeRosa
- Chief of Staff and Counselor to the Governor: Linda Lacewell
- Deputy Chief of Staff and Senior Advisor: Kelly Cummings
- Director of State Operations and Infrastructure: Kelly Cummings
- Director of State Policy and Agency Management: Adam Zurofsky
- Director of Emergency Management: Michael Kopy
- Acting Counsel to the Governor: Beth Garvey
- Special Counsel and Senior Advisor: Beth Garvey
- Director of the Budget: Robert F. Mujica Jr.
- Chairman of Energy and Finance: Richard Kauffman

== Lieutenant governor ==
Andrew Cuomo's lieutenant governor was Kathy Hochul, former United States Representative from New York's 26th district. Hochul replaced the previous lieutenant governor, Robert Duffy, the former mayor of Rochester.
