= Joseph P. Kalt =

Retired economics professor

Joseph P. Kalt (born 1951) is an American economist and the Ford Foundation Professor (Emeritus) of International Political Economy at the John F. Kennedy School of Government at Harvard University. His research focuses on governance and economic development, particularly in American Indian reservations and Indigenous communities worldwide.

In 1987, he co-founded the Harvard Project on Indigenous Governance and Development (formerly the Harvard Project on American Indian Economic Development) with Stephen Cornell, where he served as director until 2025. Kalt is recognized for his expertise in the economics of antitrust, economic development, international trade, government regulation, and taxation. From the mid-1980s until 2019, he worked as a Senior Economist at Compass Lexecon and its predecessors, providing advisory and expert witness services on regulation, taxation, and economic development to various national and international governments, including those of Thailand., China, Canada, Poland, Indonesia, and numerous Indigenous nations.

== Early life and education ==
Kalt was born and raised in Tucson, Arizona. He received his PhD in 1980 for his doctoral thesis "Federal Control of Petroleum Prices: A Case Study of the Theory of Regulation."

== Academic career ==
Kalt joined the Department of Economics at Harvard University as an instructor in 1978 and in 1983 became an associate professor of economics.

In 1981, Kalt became a Research Fellow at the Energy and Environmental Policy Center at Harvard University's John F. Kennedy School of Government (“HKS”), and shortly after began teaching courses in energy and natural resource policy at the School (which is the university's graduate school of public policy and management). In 1986, Kalt became a tenured professor of Political Economy at HKS, and subsequently the Ford Foundation Professor of International Political Economy in 1992. In 2012, he became Emeritus Professor.

Kalt has been a visiting professor at the University of Arizona’s Rogers College of Law in multiple years beginning in 2008, Eller College of Management over 2005–10, and American Indian Studies Program in various years beginning in 2008. Kalt has also served as faculty in the teaching programs of Arizona's Native Nations Institute. From 1983 to 1991, he served as lecturer in the Economics Institute for Federal Administrative Law Judges, University of Miami School of Law. In 2013, he was the distinguished visiting professor at the University of Auckland Business School. Kalt was awarded an Honorary Doctorate in 2016 by Alfred University upon his delivery of the keynote address inaugurating Alfred's new president, Mark A. Zupan.

== Other work ==
Kalt was on the President's Commission on Aviation Safety from 1987-1988.

=== Indigenous governance and development ===
In 1986, Kalt was approached by the Crow Tribe of Montana to provide pro bono advice on the Tribe’s energy-related economic development opportunities. By 1987, Kalt, in collaboration with Professor Stephen Cornell from Harvard’s Department of Sociology, had established the Harvard Project on American Indian Economic Development at the Ash Center for Democratic Governance and Innovation at Harvard Kennedy School.

In the summer of 2025, Kalt retired from his position as director of the Harvard Project on Indigenous Governance and Development.

He is a member of the President's Council of Economic Advisors for the Navajo Nation (2016–2018)

He has been a mediator in tribal-state and tribal-federal disputes, including those between the Nez Perce Tribe and the North Central Idaho Jurisdictional Alliance (MOU signed 2002).
