= Energy Czar =

Political nickname in the United States

Energy Czar, and also later Climate Czar, is a nickname, using the political term "czar", for the person in the government of the United States given authority over energy or climate policy within the executive branch. This has never been the official title of any office, but has often been informally used to refer to various officials since the 1970s.

Additionally, officials supervising energy policy at State or other sub-Federal levels have also sometimes been called "Energy Czars", for example Richard W. DeKorte was referred to as the "Energy Czar of New Jersey".

John A. Love, appointed Director of the Office of Energy Policy by President Richard M. Nixon in 1973, was the first to be widely styled as "Energy Czar". In December 1973, Nixon replaced the Energy Policy Office with the Federal Energy Office, which in May 1974 became the Federal Energy Administration. Heads of these posts (Love was followed by William E. Simon, then John Sawhill) continued to be styled "Energy Czars" through the Nixon administration, as well as under his successor Gerald Ford who appointed Frank Zarb to head of the FEA.

In 1977, the United States Department of Energy was created by the Jimmy Carter administration. It combined the roles of the Federal Energy Administration with the Energy Research and Development Administration, and raised the head of the department to a Cabinet-level position. The United States Secretary of Energy (the first being James R. Schlesinger) took over the role of previous "Energy Czars". The position became more commonly referred to simply as the "Secretary of Energy" and the nickname "Energy Czar" fell out of use.

In December 2008, President-elect Barack Obama named Carol Browner to the position of Assistant to the President for Energy and Climate Change. After Obama took office, Browner was appointed director of the White House Office of Energy and Climate Change Policy. The nickname "Energy Czar" was revived to sometimes describe Browner's position. The term "Climate Czar" was also used. (The form "Czarina" was also sometimes used for Browner.) However, once she left the administration in 2011, the term fell into disuse again at the federal level.

However, it continued to sometimes be used at the state level. In January 2013, New York Governor Andrew Cuomo announced the creation of the first energy czar position in New York State, and appointed Richard Kauffman to lead the state's energy policy.

In November 2020, President-elect Joe Biden announced former U.S. Secretary of State John Kerry would serve as his Special Presidential Envoy for Climate, a new position that would be part of the United States National Security Council (NSC). The term "Climate Czar" was used to informally describe Kerry's anticipated role. This role is now called climate envoy. Then Biden announced that former EPA Administrator Gina McCarthy would serve in another new position, White House National Climate Advisor, and media reports also referred to this position as "Climate Czar".

== See also ==
- Energy Reorganization Act of 1974
- Nuclear Regulatory Commission
- United States Atomic Energy Commission
- Energy policy of the United States
- Climate policy of the United States
