= ArentFox Schiff =

American law firm and lobbying group

ArentFox Schiff LLP
- Headquarters: Washington, D.C.
- No. of offices: 8
- No. of attorneys: approximately 680
- No. of employees: approximately 300 support staff
- Major practice areas: Litigation; Real estate; Intellectual property; Corporate
- Key people: Anthony V. Lupo (Chairman)
- Date founded: 1866; 160 years ago
- Founder: Albert E. Arent; Henry J. Fox
- Company type: Limited liability partnership
- Website: www.afslaw.com

ArentFox Schiff LLP is a white shoe law firm and lobbying firm based in Washington, D.C., with offices in New York City, Boston, San Francisco, Los Angeles, Ann Arbor, Chicago, and Lake Forest. It represents corporations, politicians, and nonprofit organizations.

In addition to its lobbying practice, it has practices in antitrust, corporate, environmental, intellectual property, litigation, real estate, tax law, bankruptcy, international trade, corporate finance, and ERISA matters. The firm also has specialized practice groups for specific industries, such as metaverse law, the automotive industry, construction, healthcare, hospitality, energy, non-profit organizations, media and entertainment, sports, and life sciences.

== History ==
In 1944, Albert E. Arent joined the law practice of Henry J. Fox, and together they founded Arent Fox. Other founders, Edwin L. Kahn, Harry M. Plotkin and Earl W. Kintner, were added, and the firm was renamed Arent, Fox, Kintner, Plotkin & Kahn.

In 2022, the firm merged with Schiff Hardin.

== Notable lawyers and alumni ==
- David J. Bardin, former Deputy Administrator of the Federal Energy Administration
- Carol A. Beier, Associate Justice of the Kansas Supreme Court, practiced white-collar criminal defense at the firm during the 1980s.
- Bob Bennett, former United States Senator from Utah.
- Randall Boe was an associate at Arent Fox before becoming general counsel to America Online.
- Dale Bumpers, former Governor of Arkansas and U.S. Senator for Arkansas, worked in the firm's Washington, D.C. office prior to his death on January 1, 2016.
- John Culver, former U.S. Senator for Iowa, worked in the firm's Washington, D.C. office prior to his death on December 27, 2018.
- Phil English, Former Member of the U.S. House of Representatives from Pennsylvania's 3rd congressional district.
- Lorie Skjerven Gildea, Chief Justice of the Minnesota Supreme Court, was an associate at Arent Fox before returning to Minnesota and beginning her career as a prosecutor.
- Byron Dorgan, former United States Senator from North Dakota.
- Doug Jones, former United States Senator from Alabama.
- Robert C. O'Brien, former 28th United States National Security Advisor, former US delegate to the 60th session of the United Nations General Assembly, joined the firm's Los Angeles office in 2007.
- Deborah K. Owen, former member of the Federal Trade Commission (FTC), joined the firm in 1994
- Pierre-Richard Prosper, former United States Ambassador-at-Large for War Crimes Issues, joined the firm's Los Angeles office in 2007.
- Jim Talent, former U.S. Senator from Missouri, served as a lobbyist at Arent Fox in 2001.
- Fred Thompson, former U.S. Senator for Tennessee, actor, and 2008 presidential candidate has served as a lobbyist for Arent Fox.
- Chris Van Hollen, U.S. Senator from Maryland, former member of the U.S. House of Representatives from Maryland's 8th district
