= James L. Sweeney =

American economist and engineer

James L. Sweeney is an American economist and engineer specializing in energy economics, environmental policy, and natural resource economics. He is professor emeritus of Management Science and Engineering at Stanford University and a senior fellow of the Stanford Institute for Economic Policy Research (SIEPR) and the Precourt Institute for Energy. He was a senior fellow of Hoover Institution.

== Education ==
Sweeney received a Bachelor of Science in electrical engineering from Massachusetts Institute of Technology and a Ph.D. in engineering-economic systems from Stanford University.

== Career ==
Sweeney joined the Stanford faculty in 1971 as an assistant professor in the department of engineering-economic systems (EES). He was promoted to associate professor in 1976 and to full professor in 1980. He served as department chair from 1991 to 1996 and again from 1996 to 1999 following the merger between the EES department and the operations research department. From 2000 until his retirement in 2024, he was professor of management science and engineering.

He was director of the Energy Modeling Forum from 1978 to 1984, chair of the Stanford Institute for Energy Studies from 1981 to 1985, and director of the Center for Economic Policy Research, now the Stanford Institute for Economic Policy Research from 1984 to 1986. He has been a senior fellow of SIEPR since 1998 and a senior fellow by courtesy at the Hoover Institution from 2001 until his retirement. From 2006 to 2018, he served as the founding director of the Precourt Energy Efficiency Center, which focused on interdisciplinary research into cost-effective approaches to energy efficiency and climate mitigation.

During the 1970s energy crisis, Sweeney held senior leadership positions at the Federal Energy Administration, directing national energy demand and supply forecasting used in federal policy analysis. At the state level, he served on Governor's Council of Economic Advisors under Arnold Schwarzenegger, as a board member of the California Council on Science and Technology, and as the first chair of the State of California Petroleum Market Advisory Committee.

Sweeney is a co-founder and continuing co-convener of the international Behavior, Energy & Climate Change Conference, an annual forum on the role of human behavior in energy use and climate outcomes, and he also established the BECC Fellows Program to support early-career researchers. He served for more than a decade on the External Advisory Council of the National Renewable Energy Laboratory and was among the founding members of the International Association for Energy Economics.

He has received the Distinguished Service Award from the Federal Energy Administration (1975), the Adelman-Frankel Award from the United States Association for Energy Economics (2007), and the Outstanding Contribution Award from the International Association for Energy Economics (2008).

== Research ==
Sweeney's research has focused on energy and environmental economics, electricity and gasoline market dynamics, depletable and renewable resource economics, energy demand and price modeling, environmental regulation, climate policy, and housing market dynamics.

His analysis of electricity market design gained prominence following the 2000–2001 California electricity crisis. In The California Electricity Crisis (2002), Sweeney examined the economic and regulatory factors underlying the crisis and proposed institutional safeguards for future electricity market restructuring.

Sweeney has also contributed extensively to the analysis of energy efficiency policy. In Energy Efficiency: Building a Clean, Secure Economy (2016), he argued that improvements in energy efficiency have played a central role in U.S. decarbonization and energy security. Earlier in his career, his theoretical research on housing market dynamics and on the economics of depletable natural resources helped establish analytical frameworks that influenced subsequent scholarship.

== Selected publications ==
Books

- Kneese, Allen V.; Sweeney, James L. (1985). Handbook of natural resource and energy economics. Handbook of natural resource and energy economics. Amsterdam New York New York, N.Y., U.S.A: North-Holland Sole distributors for the U.S.A. and Canada, Elsevier Science Pub. Co. ISBN 978-0-444-87644-7.
- Hickman, Bert G.; Huntington, Hillard G.; Sweeney, James L. (1987). Macroeconomics [i.e. Macroeconimic] Impacts of Energy Shocks. North-Holland Publishing Company. ISBN 978-0-444-70247-0.
- Kneese, Allen V.; Sweeney, James L., eds. (1993). Handbook of natural resource and energy economics. Vol. 3. Handbooks in economics. Amsterdam New York New York, N.Y., U.S.A: North-Holland. ISBN 978-0-08-054855-5.
- Stern, Paul C.; Sweeney, James L., eds. (1997). Environmentally significant consumption: research directions. Washington, D.C: National Academy Press. ISBN 978-0-309-05598-7.
- Sweeney, James L. (2002). The California Electricity Crisis. Hoover Institution Press. ISBN 978-0-8179-2911-4.
- "Energy Efficiency: Building a Clean, Secure Economy". Hoover Institution.
