= Frank Zarb =

American businessman and politician

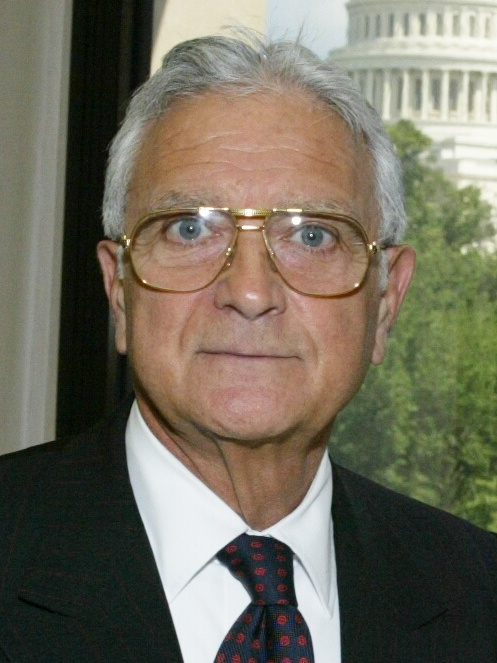

Administrator of the Federal Energy Administration
- In office December 18, 1974 – January 15, 1977
- President: Gerald Ford
- Preceded by: John C. Sawhill
- Succeeded by: Gorman Smith (acting)

Personal details
- Born: Frank Gustave Zarb; February 17, 1935 (age 91) New York City, New York, U.S.
- Party: Republican
- Education: Hofstra University (BBA, MBA)

Frank Gustave Zarb (born February 17, 1935) is an American businessman and former Republican politician. He is perhaps best known as the chairman and CEO of the NASDAQ stock exchange during the dot-com boom of the late 1990s. He is also known for his role as the "energy czar" under President Gerald Ford during the 1970s energy crisis.

== Biography ==
=== Early life ===
Frank Zarb was born to Maltese immigrant parents Gustave Zarb and Rosemary (Antinoro) Zarb in Brooklyn, New York. As a teenager in Flatbush, Brooklyn, he graduated from a vocational high school with a mechanic's certification. His English teacher urged him to go to college. In 1957 he received his Bachelor of Business Administration (BBA) at Hofstra University, then known as Hofstra College, on Long Island. Following his time in the army, he went on to earn a Master of Business Administration (MBA) from Hofstra in 1962.

=== Early corporate service ===
Following a term of service in the army from 1957 to 1958, Zarb started at CITGO, then known as Cities Service Oil Co., as a management trainee. Leaving that post in 1962, he became a general partner at Goodbody & Co. In 1969 he became the executive vice president of CBWL-Hayden Stone.

=== Government service ===
In 1971, Zarb went into public service, serving first as Assistant Secretary of Labor (1971–1972), then as Associate Director of the Office of Management and Budget (OMB) (1973–74). Finally in 1974 he was appointed "Energy Czar" by President Ford, holding dual appointments in the Energy Resources Council and the Federal Energy Administration until 1977.

=== Later corporate services ===
After leaving the federal government in 1977, Zarb became a senior partner at Lazard (1977–1988), CEO and Chairman of Smith Barney (1988–1993), and group chief executive of Travelers Group (1993–1994). In 1994, he was appointed CEO of insurance brokerage company Alexander & Alexander Services, Inc. and then oversaw that company's sale to Aon Corp. in 1997.

=== Term at NASD ===
Shortly after crafting the Long Island Power Authority (LIPA) purchase of Long Island Lighting Company (LILCO) in 1998 (as the Chairman of LIPA), Zarb became the Chairman and CEO of the National Association of Securities Dealers (NASD) from 1997 to 2001, and head of the NASD's stock exchange, the NASDAQ.

Following his retirement from NASD, Zarb became a managing director of Hellman & Friedman, which subsequently acquired a controlling stake in NASDAQ shortly after it was spun off from the NASD.

=== Term at AIG ===
In 2005, Zarb replaced his long-time friend Hank Greenberg as head of the American International Group, in what Greenberg termed as a "palace coup." At the time, Greenberg was battling charges by then-New York Attorney General, Eliot Spitzer, who (along with the U.S. Securities and Exchange Commission) was investigating Greenberg and AIG for potentially engaging in accounting improprieties.

== Relationship with Hofstra University ==
In 1974, Hofstra University gave Zarb the Distinguished Scholar award in recognition of his contributions to the university. In 1975 he was awarded an honorary Doctorate of Humane Letters by Hofstra in recognition of his contributions to the university. In 1994, the School of Business at Hofstra was renamed the Frank G. Zarb School of Business in recognition of his service as the chairman of the university's board of trustees.

== Relationship with Columbia University ==
Zarb serves as an "Executive in Residence" at Columbia Business School, the graduate school of business at Columbia University in the New York City.

== Personal life ==
On March 31, 1957, Zarb married Patricia Koster. They had two children, Krista Anne and Frank Junior.

He also, since 2002, has three grandchildren.

== Publications ==
The Stockmarket Handbook, 1969

Political offices
Preceded by John C. Sawhill	Administrator of the Federal Energy Administration; 1974–1977	Succeeded by Gorman Smith; Acting
