= Ivan L. Bennett Jr. =

American physician

President of New York University
- Acting; 1979–1981
- Preceded by: John C. Sawhill
- Succeeded by: John Brademas

15th Dean of the New York University School of Medicine
- In office 1970–1982
- Preceded by: Lewis Thomas
- Succeeded by: Saul J. Farber

Personal details
- Born: Ivan Loveridge Bennett Jr. March 4, 1922 Washington, D.C., U.S.
- Died: July 22, 1990 (aged 68) Tokyo, Japan
- Spouse: Martha Rhodes
- Parent: Ivan L. Bennett (father)
- Education: Emory University (BA, MD)
- Occupation: Physician; professor

Ivan Loveridge Bennett Jr. (March 4, 1922 – July 22, 1990) was an American physician who was dean of the NYU School of Medicine and served as president of New York University 1980–1981.

Bennett was educated at Emory University where he was a member of Sigma Chi fraternity. Graduated with a B.A. in 1943, and a medical degree in 1946. Bennett was Deputy Director of the Office of Science and Technology Policy under Lyndon B. Johnson between 1967 and 1969. Bennett was also director of the department of pathology at Johns Hopkins University and also taught at Yale and New York University.

He was elected a member of the American Academy of Arts and Sciences in 1972.

Academic offices
Preceded by John C. Sawhill	President of New York University; 1979–1981	Succeeded by John Brademas
