= Roy Ash =

American politician

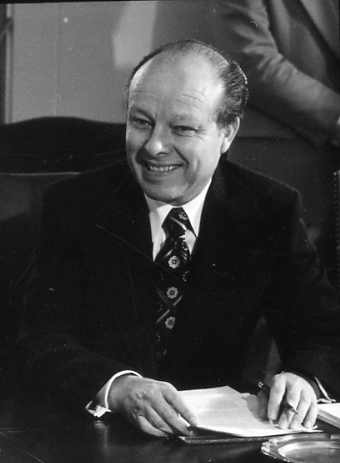

21st Director of the Office of Management and Budget
- In office February 2, 1973 – February 3, 1975
- President: Richard Nixon; Gerald Ford
- Preceded by: Caspar Weinberger
- Succeeded by: James Lynn

Personal details
- Born: Roy Lawrence Ash; October 20, 1918 Los Angeles, California, U.S.
- Died: December 14, 2011 (aged 93) Los Angeles, California, U.S.
- Party: Independent
- Spouse: Lila Hornbek (1943–2011)
- Children: 5
- Education: Harvard University (MBA)

Military service
- Allegiance: United States
- Branch/service: United States Army
- Rank: Captain
- Unit: United States Army Air Corps
- Battles/wars: World War II

Roy Lawrence Ash (October 20, 1918 – December 14, 2011) was the co-founder and president of the American company Litton Industries and director of the Office of Management and Budget from February 2, 1973 until February 3, 1975, during the administrations of Presidents Richard M. Nixon and Gerald R. Ford.

== Early life and education ==
Roy Lawrence Ash was born October 20, 1918, in Los Angeles, California, the son of Charles K. Ash and the former Fay E. Dickinson. Ash graduated from high school when he was 16, and was employed by Bank of America as a city cash-collection messenger. Shortly after World War II began, Ash enlisted in the Army Air Corps as the private, and the after a succession of promotions, became a captain in the Army Air Corps, serving in the Office of Management Control. After the war, he attended Harvard Business School, graduating with an MBA and as a Baker Scholar in 1947. After briefly working again with Bank of America, he joined Hughes Aircraft and soon led its finance department.

Ash married Lila Marie Hornbek on November 13, 1943 and had three sons and two daughters, (Charles, James, Robert, Loretta and Marilyn). Ash has been reported to have had a great smile and a great laugh.

In 1953, Ash and his partner, Tex Thornton, bought Litton Industries, a small West Coast producer of microwave tubes. By the time Ash became president of the company in 1961, Litton had completed 25 mergers and operated 48 plants in nine countries in an aggressive acquisition plan, with sales of $245 million. By 1965, the company had over $900 million in sales and produced 5,000 different items.

== Political life ==
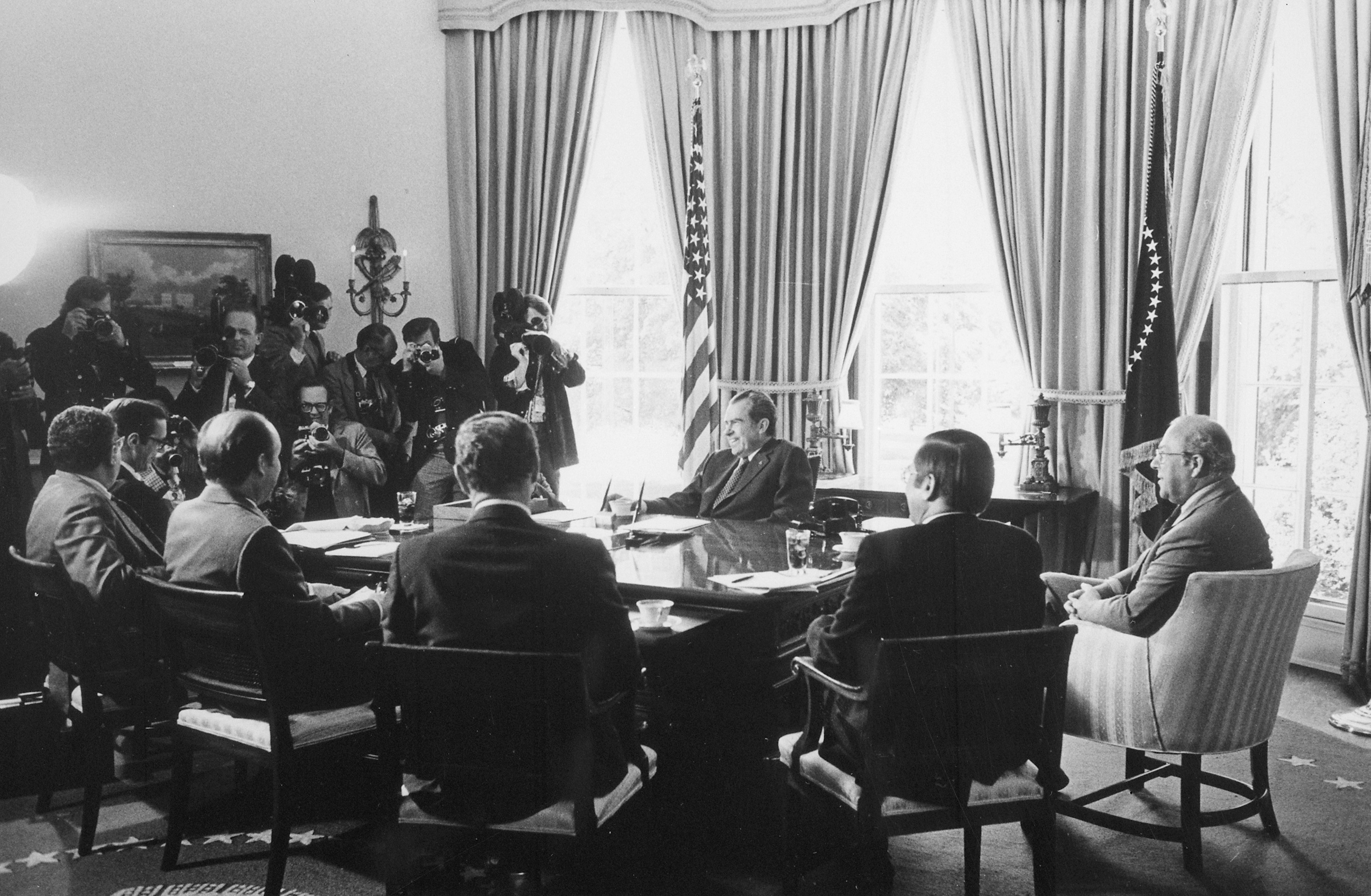
A meeting of Nixon Administration economic advisors and cabinet members on May 7, 1974. Clockwise from Richard Nixon: George P. Shultz, James T. Lynn, Alexander M. Haig, Jr., Roy L. Ash, Herbert Stein, and William E. Simon.

=== Ash Commission ===
After his election as president in 1968, Richard Nixon asked Ash to create and lead the President's Advisory Council on Executive Organization, which later came to be known as the Ash Commission. In a memo that Ash sent to Nixon in 1969, he reported finding "virtual unanimity that organizational improvement of the Executive Office of the President is needed." Among the Commission's recommendations was that the Bureau of the Budget should be expanded and elevated in authority to become the Office of Management and Budget (OMB), established to develop results-oriented leadership throughout the federal government. Ash connected this proposal to "a concept that no matter how awesome its size, government can be made more effective by using management techniques."

In November 1969, the President's Domestic Council instructed Ash to study whether all federal environmental activities should be unified in one agency. According to a report by the U.S. EPA, during meetings in spring 1970, Ash at first expressed a preference for a single department to oversee both environmental and natural resource management, but by April he had changed his mind. In a memorandum to the President he advocated a separate regulatory agency devoted solely to anti-pollution programs. The report of the Commission lead to the creation of the Environmental Protection Agency.

=== Later political endeavors ===
Following Nixon's re-election in 1972, Ash was named the director of the OMB. In the fall of 1973, amidst national panic that followed imposition of the Arab oil embargo, Ash cautioned Nixon to move deliberately, predicting that "in a few months, I suspect, we will look back on the energy crisis somewhat like we now view beef prices -- a continuing and routine governmental problem -- but not a Presidential crisis."

After leaving OMB he joined Addressograph-Multigraph (later AM International) in an attempt to rescue the foundering duplicator company at a time when the duplication industry was shifting to photocopiers from Xerox. He resigned from AM in 1981.

== Later life ==
In 2003, he and his wife donated $15,000,000 to Harvard to endow the Roy and Lila Ash Center for Democratic Governance and Innovation at Harvard Kennedy School.

He served as a member of the Committee for a Responsible Federal Budget.

In January 2007, he sold one of his two massive Virginia "hunt country" properties for $22 million. It was the highest price ever recorded for a property in Loudoun County. Known as "Llangollen," the Middleburg, Virginia 1,100-acre (4.5 km^{2}) equestrian manor was acquired by Ash in 1989 from the estate of Liz Whitney Tippett, first wife of John Hay Whitney. Ash still retained ownership of another Middleburg-area hunt country estate, "Huntlands" at the time of his death, which he tried unsuccessfully to sell in 2005 for $18.8 million. That 550 acres (2.2 km^{2}) property's main house was built in 1837 with major additions added in 1911, and has been the weekend retreat for senators, congressmen, and diplomats, and Presidents Lyndon Baines Johnson and John F. Kennedy visited Huntlands on numerous occasions.

Ash died from Parkinson's disease on December 14, 2011, at the age of 93.

Political offices
Preceded by Caspar Weinberger	Director of the Office of Management and Budget; 1973–1975	Succeeded by James Lynn
