= John P. Hiler =

American politician

John Hiler
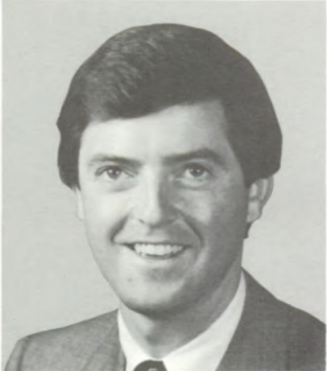

Member of the U.S. House of Representatives from Indiana's 3rd district
- In office January 3, 1981 – January 3, 1991
- Preceded by: John Brademas
- Succeeded by: Tim Roemer

Personal details
- Born: John Patrick Hiler; April 24, 1953 (age 73) Chicago, Illinois, U.S.
- Party: Republican
- Education: Williams College (BA); University of Chicago (MBA)

John Patrick Hiler (born April 24, 1953) is an American politician and businessman who served five terms as a United States representative from Indiana from 1981 to 1991.

== Biography ==
Born in Chicago, Illinois, Hiler graduated from La Lumiere School, La Porte, Indiana, 1971. He earned a B.A. from Williams College in 1975, and an M.B.A. from University of Chicago Graduate School of Business in 1977. He served as a marketing director for a business based in Indiana.

He later served as a delegate at the White House Conference of Small Business in 1980. He also served as a delegate for the Indiana State Republican conventions, from 1978 to 1980.

In 1978, Hiler ran for the Indiana House of Representatives in the 7th district. However, he lost the general election.

== Congress ==
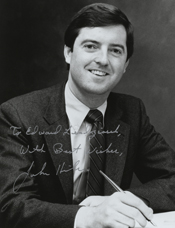
John P. Hiler

Hiler was elected as a Republican to the 97th and to the four succeeding Congresses (January 3, 1981 – January 3, 1991). In 1980, he unseated 22-year Democratic incumbent and House Majority Whip John Brademas in a major upset that was driven largely by the national political climate and the Ronald Reagan vs. Jimmy Carter presidential election campaign. He was reelected four times in hard-fought campaigns, but was narrowly defeated for reelection to the 102nd Congress in 1990 by one of Brademas' former staffers, Tim Roemer.

=== Later career ===
He was deputy administrator at the General Services Administration from 1991 to 1993. A business executive with Hiler Industries, he is a resident of South Bend, Indiana.

U.S. House of Representatives
Preceded by John Brademas	Member of the U.S. House of Representatives from Indiana's 3rd congressional district 1981–1991	Succeeded by Tim Roemer
U.S. order of precedence (ceremonial)
Preceded by Garret Graves as Former U.S. Representative	Order of precedence of the United States as Former U.S. Representative	Succeeded by Baron Hill as Former U.S. Representative
