= David J. Bardin =

American government official (born 1933)

David Jonas Bardin (born June 2, 1933) is a retired American government official who served as Deputy Administrator of the Federal Energy Administration in 1977 as well as Administrator of the Economic Regulatory Administration in the United States Department of Energy.

== Biography ==
Bardin was born on June 2, 1933, in New York City. He received an A.B. from Columbia College in 1954 and LL.B. from Columbia Law School in 1956. He served in the U.S. Army from 1956 to 1958.

Bardin joined the University of Virginia as lecturer in 1958 and worked as an attorney for the Federal Power Commission from 1958 to 1969. He left the FPC in 1969 as Deputy General Counsel to serve as Assistant to the Attorney General of Israel whose portfolio included public utilities, administrative and environmental law.

From 1972 to 1974, he worked as an independent attorney in Jerusalem and Washington, D.C. In 1974, he was named Commissioner of the New Jersey Department of Environmental Protection and served in that position until 1977.

On March 31, 1977, he was named by President Jimmy Carter to be Deputy Administrator of the Federal Energy Administration.

After the Federal Energy Administration was merged into the newly founded United States Department of Energy in October 1977, Bardin became Administrator of the Economic Regulatory Administration, which included the petroleum allocation and pricing functions, two energy development programs, ombudsman function, and ten regional offices of the former FEA. He served as Administrator of the ERA until 1979.

After returning to the private sector, Bardin joined Arent Fox, where he specialized in public utilities, energy, and environmental law on behalf of corporate and public clients.
