= Ash Center for Democratic Governance and Innovation =

Public policy research institute in Cambridge, Massachusetts, USA

- Named after: Roy and Lila Ash
- Formation: 2003
- Type: International relations
- Location: Cambridge, Massachusetts
- Parent organization: Harvard Kennedy School

Ash Center for Democratic Governance and Innovation, formerly known as the Ash Institute, was established in 2003 and is part of the Harvard Kennedy School at Harvard University in Cambridge, Massachusetts, in the United States.

The center's mission is to advance public discussion and public policy research on key issues of democratic governance worldwide, as well as recognize and promote innovations in government that are improving the lives of citizens. The center consists of three major programs: the Program on Democratic Governance, the Innovations in Government Program; and the Rajawali Foundation Institute for Asia.

== History ==
In April 2001, the Ford Foundation announced a $50 million endowment to the Harvard Kennedy School. This endowment was the largest single endowment ever made by the Ford Foundation at that time. Susan Berresford, then president of the Ford Foundation, explained that the endowment would enable much-needed recognition of numerous innovative government programs in the United States and worldwide.

The grant enabled Harvard Kennedy School to launch the Innovations in American Government Awards in 1985 which recognizes and supports state, local, tribal, and territorial government initiatives. Many past award winners have been replicated around the country including:

- CitiStat: As a 2004 Innovations in American Government Award winner, CitiStat was launched in 1999 as a tool for improving the performance of Baltimore's city government practices. The tool has quickly become an industry standard for driving down costs and improving citizen engagement initiatives: more than 11 U.S. cities have adopted the CitiStat model, including SomerStat in Somerville, Massachusetts, ProvStat in Providence, Rhode Island, and PerformanceStat in Los Angeles.
- Brownfields Economic Redevelopment Initiative: Created by the U.S. Environmental Protection Agency in 1995, the initiative has allocated more than $500 million to leverage a total of $9.6 billion in cleanup funds, resulting in the assessment of more than 10,000 sites and the comprehensive development of nearly 200 sites that were previously condemned and vacant due to dangerous contamination. The program was a 2000 Innovations in American Government Award winner.
- Competition and Costing: While Mayor of Indianapolis in the mid-1990s, Stephen Goldsmith spearheaded a program to privatize city services through managed competition, improving efficiencies and cutting unnecessary costs. “As a result of the recognition we received from the Innovations Award, we had more than 3,000 officials from around the country and beyond coming to see how we did it,” said Goldsmith. Mayor Goldsmith went on to serve as the director of the Innovations in Government Program, overseeing the Innovations Awards program. He later served as deputy mayor of New York City.

=== Roy and Lila Ash ===
In 2003, Harvard Kennedy School received a substantial gift from benefactors Roy and Lila Ash. Designed to enhance the Innovations in American Government Awards Program by emphasizing the connection between innovation and democratic governance, the gift created the Ash Center. Roy Ash's own experience in the public and private sector made him aptly positioned to set the vision for the new Ash Center. Ash served as a cabinet member in two U.S. government administrations and is the founder of the modern Office of Management and Budget.

“We have to consider the concept of democracy fragile and in need of real and constant hands-on care,” said Roy Ash. “The purpose of the Institute [now Ash Center] is to encourage thoughtful and focused attention to the nature, principles, functioning, and continued innovation and adaptations essential to a living and effective democracy."

== Projects ==
The Ash Center offers grant funding and internship opportunities for students in the Harvard community. Support for field research in Indonesia and Vietnam, as well as other regions are also offered. Its Ford Foundation Mason Fellowship and Roy and Lila Ash Fellowship provide financial support to students studying at the Harvard Kennedy School.

=== The Study of Democratic Governance ===
In November 2008, Harvard Kennedy School announced a new initiative with the Ford Foundation to link innovative governance to the world's major social challenges.

The Program on Democratic Governance includes research on democratic participation, immigration, and democracy in the developed and developing world.

The center now hosts the Seminar Series, bringing distinguished speakers to Harvard Kennedy School throughout the academic year to address critical challenges facing democratic governance. Its Democracy Fellowships program provides financial support for doctoral and postdoctoral students to pursue research related to democratic governance.

=== Rajawali Foundation Institute for Asia ===
Under the leadership of Ash Center Director Anthony Saich, Asia Programs, a school-wide initiative integrating Asia-related activities, joined the Ash Center in July 2008.

The permanently endowed Rajawali Foundation Institute for Asia consisting of Asia Programs was established on January 1, 2010, through support from the Rajawali Foundation in Indonesia. The new Institute is designed to bring together academics and practitioners from around the world to enhance research, teaching, and training on public policy and governance issues of critical importance in Asia. The gift also established the HKS Indonesia Program, which promotes research, education, and capacity building in support of democratic governance and institutional development in Indonesia.

Both the Institute for Asia and the HKS Indonesia Program are housed within the Ash Center. Other Institute for Asia programs include its China Public Policy Program, Vietnam Program, and HKS Singapore Program. The institute also supports Rajawali Fellows, a host of academics and public practitioners with independent research projects relevant to Asia. Its annual China Goes Global Conference examines the impact of the internationalization of Chinese firms.

=== Innovations in Government Program ===
In addition to the Innovations in American Government Awards Program, the Innovations in Government Program includes five additional projects that work together to produce a cohesive marketplace for best practices and successful innovations in the public sector. These include the following projects: the Liaison Group for Innovations in Governance and Public Action; the Project on Municipal Innovation; the Forum on Networked Governance; the Social Innovation Project; Better, Faster, Cheaper—Smart Ideas for Government; and the Program on Crisis Leadership.

In 2019, the Harvard Project on American Indian Economic Development joined the Ash Center, adding then nearly 33 years of research in determining what works for tribal nations in their pursuit of good governance, and why.

==== Data-Smart City Solutions ====
The Data-Smart City Solutions initiative at the Ash Center is supported by Bloomberg Philanthropies.
