= Herbert Stein =

American economist (1916–1999)

9th Chair of the Council of Economic Advisers
- In office January 1, 1972 – August 31, 1974
- President: Richard Nixon; Gerald Ford
- Preceded by: Paul McCracken
- Succeeded by: Alan Greenspan

Personal details
- Born: August 27, 1916 Detroit, Michigan, U.S.
- Died: September 8, 1999 (aged 83) Washington, D.C., U.S.
- Party: Republican
- Children: 2, including Ben Stein
- Education: Williams College (BA); University of Chicago (MA, PhD)

Academic background
- Influences: Milton Friedman

Academic work
- Discipline: Economic policy; Macroeconomics
- School or tradition: Chicago school of economics

Herbert Stein (August 27, 1916 – September 8, 1999) was an American economist, a senior fellow at the American Enterprise Institute, and a member of the board of contributors of The Wall Street Journal. He was the chairman of the Council of Economic Advisers under Richard Nixon and Gerald Ford. From 1974 to 1984, he was the A. Willis Robertson Professor of Economics at the University of Virginia.

== Biography ==
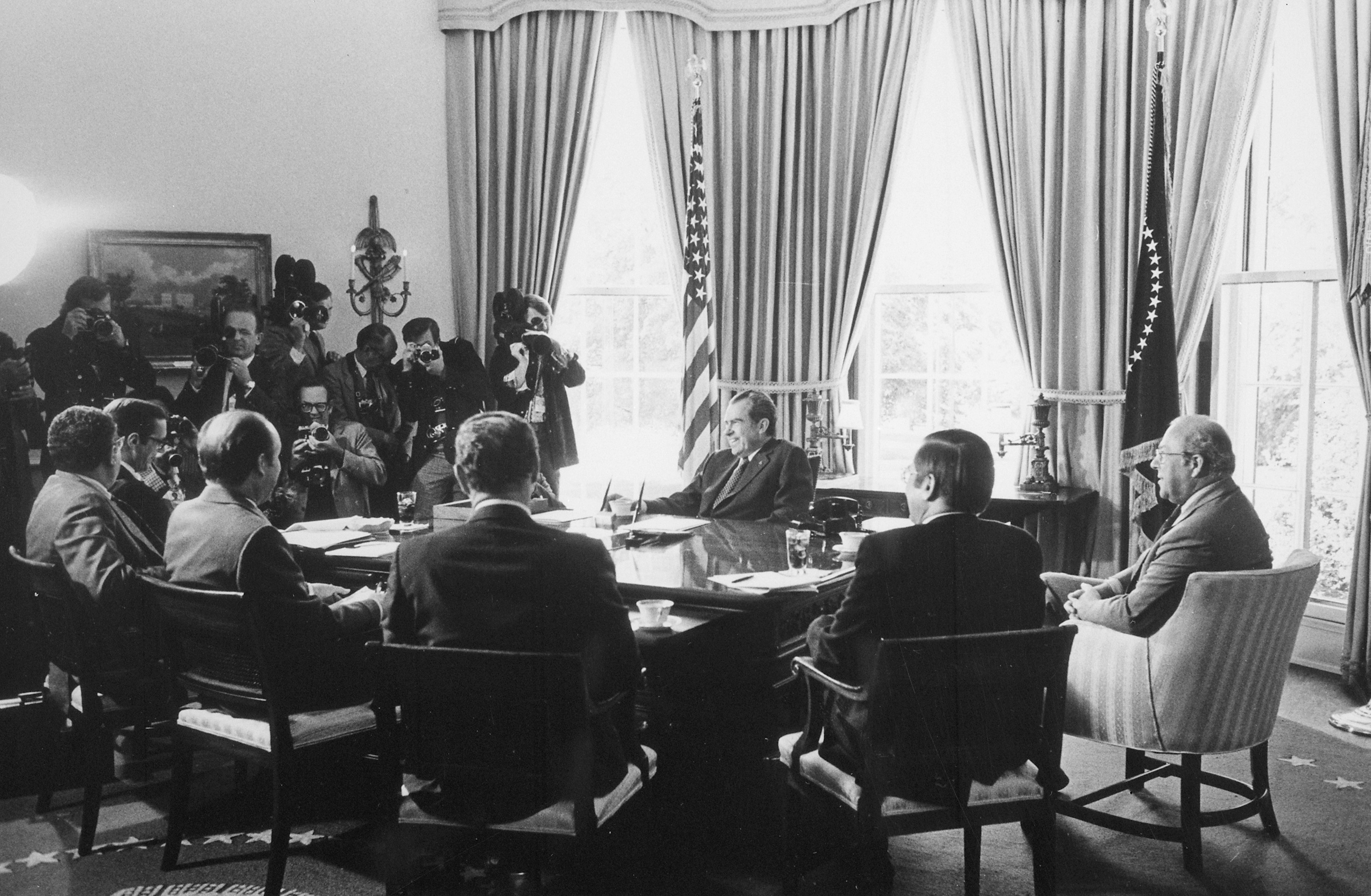
A meeting of Nixon administration economic advisors and cabinet members on May 7, 1974. Clockwise from Richard Nixon: George P. Shultz, James T. Lynn, Alexander M. Haig, Jr., Roy L. Ash, Herbert Stein, and William E. Simon.

Stein was born on August 27, 1916, in Detroit, Michigan. His family moved to New York during the Great Depression. Stein enrolled in Williams College just before he turned 16. After graduating with Phi Beta Kappa honors, he went to Washington, DC, to work as an economist in various agencies. Stein received his doctorate in economics from the University of Chicago in 1958.

Stein, who died September 8, 1999, in Washington, DC, was married to Mildred Stein, who died in 1997 after 61 years of marriage. He is the father of the lawyer, author, and actor Ben Stein and the writer Rachel Stein. Herbert Stein was also the original writer for the advice column Dear Prudence.

== Views ==
Stein was known as a pragmatic conservative and was referred to as "a liberal's conservative and a conservative's liberal." He was the author of The Fiscal Revolution in America.

In one article, Stein wrote that the people who wore an "Adam Smith necktie" did so to:

make a statement of their devotion to the idea of free markets and limited government. What stands out in [Smith's seminal work] Wealth of Nations, however, is that their patron saint was not pure or doctrinaire about this idea. He viewed government intervention in the market with great skepticism. He regarded his exposition of the virtues of the free market as his main contribution to policy, and the purpose for which his economic analysis was developed. Yet he was prepared to accept or propose qualifications to that policy in the specific cases where he judged that their net effect would be beneficial and would not undermine the basically free character of the system.

=== Stein's Law ===
Stein propounded Stein's Law, which he expressed in 1986 as "If something cannot go on forever, it will stop." Stein observed this logic in analyzing economic trends (such as rising US federal debt in proportion to GDP, or increasing international balance of payments deficits, in his analysis): if such a process is limited by external factors, any failure to stop it through policy is not an insurmountable problem, since it is sure to stop regardless.

== Publications ==
- Herbert Stein (1995). On the Other Hand – Essays on Economics, Economists, and Politics. American Enterprise Institute. ISBN 978-0-8447-3877-2.
- Herbert Stein (1996) [1969]. The fiscal revolution in America: policy in pursuit of reality. AEI Press. ISBN 978-0-8447-3936-6.
- Herbert Stein (1994) [1984]. Presidential economics: the making of economic policy from Roosevelt to Clinton. American Enterprise Institute for Public Policy Research. ISBN 978-0-8447-3851-2.
- Stein, Herbert (1986). "The Washington Economics Industry". The American Economic Review. 76 (2): 1–9. JSTOR 1818725.
- Stein, Herbert (1960). "A Hard Look at America's Unfavorable Balance of Payments". The Annals of the American Academy of Political and Social Science. 330: 77–85. doi:10.1177/000271626033000117. JSTOR 1032988. S2CID 154591112.
- Stein, Herbert (2008). "Balance of Payments". In Henderson, David R. (ed.). The Concise Encyclopedia of Economics. Library of Economics and Liberty (2nd ed.). Liberty Fund. pp. 27–29. ISBN 978-0865976665.

Political offices
Preceded by Paul McCracken	Chair of the Council of Economic Advisers; 1972–1974	Succeeded by Alan Greenspan
