= William E. Simon =

American politician (1927–2000)

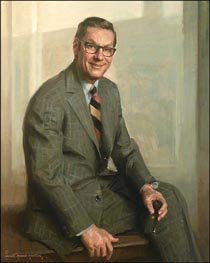
- Official portrait, 1977

63rd United States Secretary of the Treasury
- In office May 9, 1974 – January 20, 1977
- President: Richard Nixon; Gerald Ford
- Preceded by: George Shultz
- Succeeded by: W. Michael Blumenthal

Director of the Federal Energy Office
- In office December 4, 1973 – May 9, 1974
- President: Richard Nixon
- Preceded by: John Love (Energy Policy Office)
- Succeeded by: John C. Sawhill

United States Deputy Secretary of Treasury
- In office January 22, 1973 – May 9, 1974
- President: Richard Nixon

President of the United States Olympic Committee
- In office 1981–1985
- Preceded by: Robert Kane
- Succeeded by: Jack Kelly Jr.

Personal details
- Born: William Edward Simon; November 27, 1927 Paterson, New Jersey, U.S.
- Died: June 3, 2000 (aged 72) Santa Barbara, California, U.S.
- Party: Republican
- Spouses: Carol Girard (m. 1950; died 1995); Tonia Adams Donnelley (m. 1996)
- Children: 7, including Bill
- Education: Lafayette College (BA)

Military service
- Allegiance: United States
- Branch/service: United States Army
- Years of service: 1946–1948

William Edward Simon (November 27, 1927 – June 3, 2000) was an American businessman and philanthropist who served as the 63rd United States Secretary of the Treasury. He became the Secretary of the Treasury on May 9, 1974, during the Nixon administration. After Nixon resigned, Simon was reappointed by President Gerald Ford and served until 1977 when President Jimmy Carter took office. Outside of government, he was a successful businessman and philanthropist. The William E. Simon Foundation carries on this legacy. He styled himself as a strong advocate of laissez-faire capitalism. He wrote, "There is only one social system that reflects the sovereignty of the individual: the free-market, or capitalist, system".

== Early life and career ==
Simon was born in Paterson, New Jersey, on November 27, 1927, the son of Eleanor (née Kearns) and Charles Simon Jr., an insurance executive. He attended Blair Academy and graduated from Newark Academy, where he focused more on sports than scholastic pursuits.

After service in the infantry of the United States Army, he received his B.A. in 1952 from Lafayette College in Easton, Pennsylvania, where he was a member of Delta Kappa Epsilon fraternity (Rho Chapter). In his later life, Simon was a member of the board of trustees from 1972 to 1973.

== Career ==
Simon began his career with Union Securities in 1952. He later served as vice president of Weeden & Co. before being named senior partner in charge of the government and municipal bonds at Salomon Brothers, where he was a member of the firm's seven-man executive committee.

=== Federal government service ===
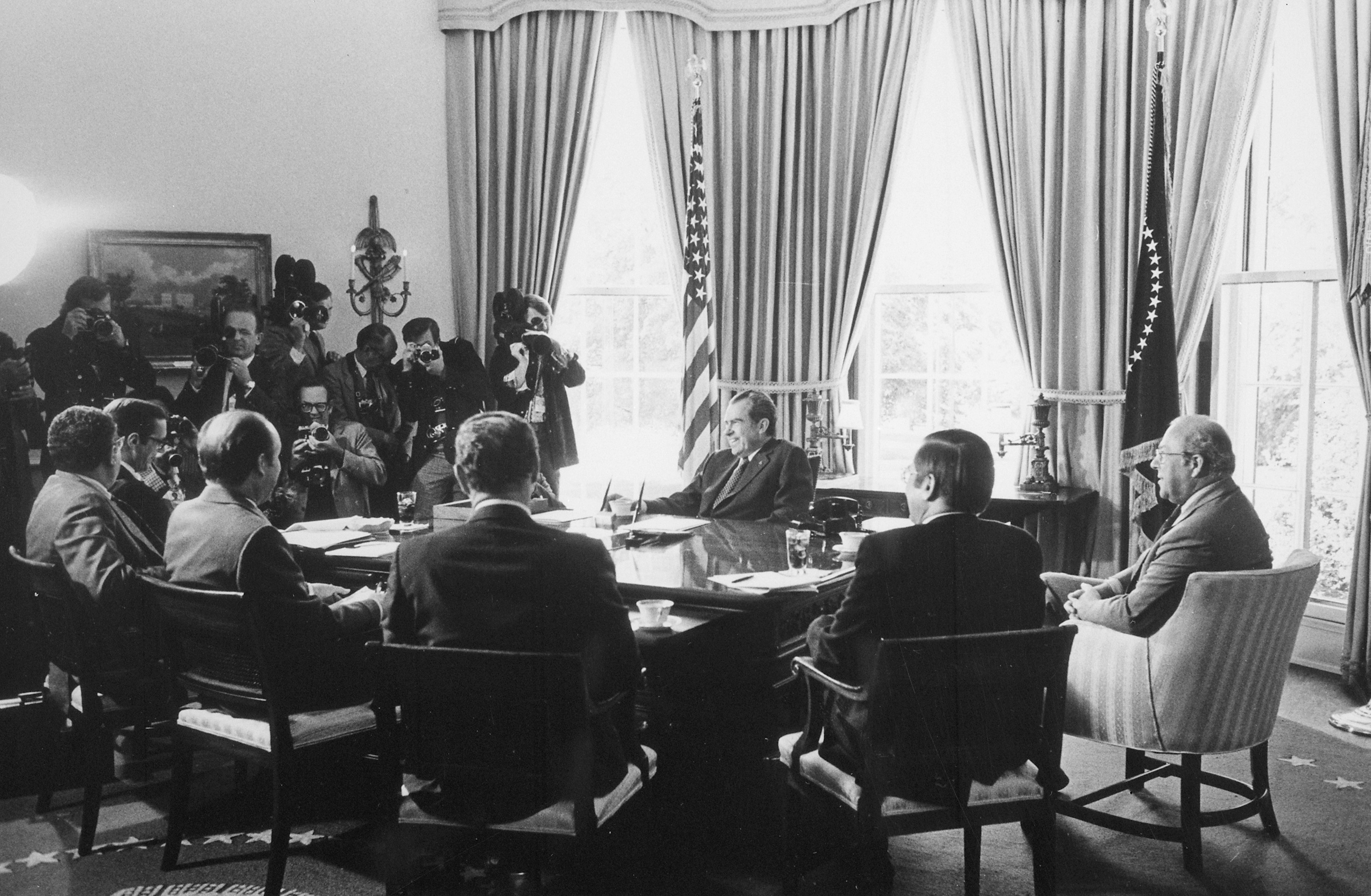
An Oval Office meeting of Nixon administration economic advisors and cabinet members on May 7, 1974. Clockwise from Richard Nixon: George Shultz, James T. Lynn, Alexander Haig, Roy Ash, Herbert Stein, and Simon.

At the time of his nomination as Treasury Secretary, Simon was serving as Deputy Secretary of the Treasury, a post he held since January 22, 1973. As Deputy Secretary, Simon supervised the Nixon administration's program to restructure and improve U.S. financial institutions. Beginning December 4, 1973, he served as the first administrator of the Federal Energy Office, and simultaneously launched and administered the Federal Energy Administration at the height of the oil embargo. As such he became known as the high-profile "Energy Czar", and represented a revitalization of the "czar" term in U.S. politics. He chaired the President's Oil Policy Committee and was instrumental in revising the mandatory oil import program in April 1973. Simon was a member of the President's Energy Resources Council and continued to have major responsibility for coordinating both domestic and international energy policy.

In August 1974, only three months after Simon became U.S. Secretary of the Treasury, President Nixon resigned. President Gerald Ford, Nixon's successor, asked Simon to continue serving as Treasury Secretary, and Ford later appointed him chairman of the Economic Policy Board and chief spokesman for the Ford administration on economic issues.

On April 8, 1975, President Ford also named him chairman of the newly created East-West Foreign Trade Board, established under the authority of the Trade Act of 1974.

In 1977, Simon received the Alexander Hamilton Award, the Treasury Department's highest honor. In 1976, while serving as Secretary of the Treasury, President Anwar Sadat of Egypt presented Simon with the Collar of the Republic/Order of the Nile. Simon's term as Secretary of the Treasury ended on January 20, 1977.

As Treasury Secretary, Simon claimed to support free markets and to spurn government policies that either subsidized or penalized businesses. In Simon's own words:

Throughout the last century the attachment of businessmen to free enterprise has weakened dramatically as they discovered they could demand – and receive – short-range advantages from the state ... I watched with incredulity as businessmen ran to the government in every crisis, whining for handouts or protection from the very competition that has made this system so productive.

=== Private sector career ===
Simon attempted to purchase controlling interest in the Baltimore Orioles from Jerold Hoffberger for $12 million, but it aroused fears that he was going to move the franchise to Washington, D.C. Negotiations which began in the summer of 1978 ended when he withdrew his offer on February 5, 1979. He bitterly complained, "Mr. Hoffberger wants to play both ends against the middle. Well, he can forget this end. I think at this point and at this time the game is over. He has damaged the merchandise and acted in bad faith. I think I've been played dirty pool everywhere to Sunday." The Orioles were acquired at the same price six months later on August 2 by Edward Bennett Williams who had represented Simon in those negotiations.

Simon was a pioneer of the leveraged buyout (LBO) in the 1980s. Following government service, Simon was a Vice Chairman at Blyth Eastman Dillon for three years, He and his partner, then co-founded with Ray Chambers, a tax accountant, Wesray Capital Corporation (Simon contributing the "Wes" and Chambers contributing the "ray" based on his initials), an LBO firm that bought and sold, among others, the Gibson Greeting Card Company, Anchor Glass, and the Simmons Mattress Company, typically investing tiny fractions of their own money and including significant debt to complete the purchase from prior shareholders, and then selling the companies whole or piecemeal after making changes that "often included job cutbacks and other short-term cost-reduction measures.". In 1982, Wesray invested approximately $1 million in equity capital (with Simon contributing $330,000) and borrowed another $79 million to take private a Cincinnati-based greeting card company, Gibson Greetings, for $80 million. Eighteen months later, the company was taken public again, with a value of $290 million, and Simon's $330,000 investment was worth $66 million.

In 1984, he launched WSGP International, which concentrated on investments in real estate and financial service organizations in the western United States and on the Pacific Rim. In 1988, together with sons William E. Simon Jr. and J. Peter Simon, he founded William E. Simon & Sons, a global merchant bank with offices in New Jersey, Los Angeles, and Hong Kong. The firm is now extensively involved in providing venture capital. In 1990, he partnered with several investors to form Catterton-Simon Partners, a private equity firm focused on beverages and other consumer products, which today is known as Catterton Partners.

In the Anchor Glass case, Simon made millions more through deals with the company wherein the company leased its land, buildings, and equipment from Simon. Wesray also received banking fees for handling the subsequent purchase by Anchor of Midland Glass Company. Anchor Glass also bought casualty, liability, employee health and benefit insurance from a brokerage firm partially owned by Simon. The Anchor Glass corporate headquarters in Tampa was leased from Simon. Anchor Glass later admitted in an SEC filing, that "these arrangements ... were not the result of arm's length bargaining ... [and] were not ... favorable to the company". Anchor Glass was finally bought by a Mexican company, Vitro, S.A.

Simmons Mattress Company, a company founded in 1886, was bought by Wesray and partners bought in 1986 for $120 million and sold it in 1989 for $241 million.

By the late 1980s, Forbes magazine was estimating Simon's wealth at $300 million.

During his business career, Simon served on the boards of over thirty companies including Xerox, Citibank, Halliburton, Dart & Kraft, and United Technologies.

In 2017, William E. Simon & Sons merged with Massy Quick & Company in an all-equity transaction.

=== Non-profit positions ===
Simon was an active member of the United States Olympic Committee, serving as treasurer from 1977 to 1981 and as president from 1981 to 1985, where he oversaw the 1984 Winter Olympics in Sarajevo and the 1984 Summer Olympics in Los Angeles. He chaired the U.S. Olympic Foundation, created with the profits of the Los Angeles games, from 1985 through 1997, and was inducted into the U.S. Olympic Hall of Fame in 1991. An additional athletics-related honor came on October 11, 1975, when Simon threw out the first pitch of the 1975 World Series at Boston's Fenway Park on behalf of President Ford.

Simon received numerous awards during his career in sports. Among them are the Olympic Torch, issued by the U.S. Olympic Committee, and the Olympic Order, issued by the International Olympic Committee. Simon served as an officer or on the board of the Jesse Owens Foundation, the Basketball Hall of Fame, the National Tennis Foundation and Hall of Fame, the U.S. Amateur Boxing Foundation, the Women's Sports Foundation, and the World Cup '94 organizing and executive committees.

== Personal life ==
Simon was a resident of Harding Township, New Jersey. The superyacht Itasca was owned by Simon; it was the first such yacht to pass through the Northwest Passage, followed by a visit to Antarctica.

He was married first to Carol Girard in 1950. William and Carol Simon had two sons and five daughters (Bill, J. Peter, Mary Beth, Carol Leigh, Aimee, Julie Ann, and Johanna). She died in 1995. Simon married his second wife, Tonia Adams Donnelley, in 1996.

== Death ==
Simon died on June 3, 2000, at age 72, in Santa Barbara, California, from complications of pulmonary fibrosis.

== Legacy ==
At the U.S. Military Academy at West Point, Simon established the William E. Simon Center for the Professional Military Ethic and at the U.S. Air Force Academy, he established the William E. Simon Center for Strategic Studies and a Simon professorship.

In 1976, Simon received the U.S. Senator John Heinz Award, named for former U.S. Senator John Heinz, for the "Greatest Public Service by an Elected or Appointed Official", an award given out annually by Jefferson Awards.

In 1978, Simon and Irving Kristol founded The Institute For Education Affairs, which merged with the Madison Center to become the Madison Center for Educational Affairs in 1990.

Simon served as president of the John M. Olin Foundation and as trustee of The John Templeton Foundation. He has also served on the boards of many of the nation's premier think tanks, including The Heritage Foundation and the Hoover Institution. He was the author of two best-selling books, A Time for Truth in 1978 (ghostwritten by libertarian author Edith Efron) and A Time for Action in 1980.

In 1986, in recognition of his leadership in business, finance, and public service, the Graduate School of Management at the University of Rochester was renamed the William E. Simon Graduate School of Business Administration. The same year, Simon received the Golden Plate Award of the American Academy of Achievement.

On October 26, 2007, a profile on Simon's son William Simon Jr. in The Washington Post described Simon Sr. as "a legendary architect of the modern conservative movement" but also describes him as being "legendarily mean." The profile quotes Simon Sr.'s friend, Edwin Feulner, president of The Heritage Foundation, who described Simon Sr. as "a mean, nasty, tough bond trader who took no BS from anyone." It relates as an example of this aspect of his character that Simon Sr. "would awaken his children on weekend mornings by dousing their heads with buckets of cold water." The Washington Post's profile of Simon Jr. analysizes the lasting impact of Watergate on Simon Sr. this way:

... Simon [Sr.] came away from the experience of Watergate with a disgust for the partisan character of the affair, and the capital. The experience of [Nixon's] impeachment convinced him [...] not that partisanship was necessarily poisonous, but that his opponents were far better at partisanship than his side was. [...] Simon would spend the remainder of his life helping to redress the balance ...

Since 2001, the William E. Simon Prize for Philanthropic Leadership has been awarded to distinguished living donors, including John T. Walton, John Templeton, and Phil Anschutz.

In 2004, the Intercollegiate Studies Institute dedicated a $40,000 cash prize in honor of Secretary Simon. Each year since, the William E. Simon Fellowship for Noble Purpose has been awarded to a college senior desiring to live a life dedicated to serving humanity.

=== William E. Simon Scholarship Fund ===
The William E. Simon Scholarship Fund provides financial assistance for academically highly qualified students of the Pontifical University of Saint Thomas Aquinas, Angelicum who live in Rome who would otherwise lack the resources to cover their educational expenses. Each scholarship award provides no more than 40% of the total annual expense of tuition, room, board, and related fees and expenses. Annually, the William E. Simon Scholarship Fund allocates 50% of the scholarship fund for lay students.

== Notes ==
Political offices
Preceded by John Love as Director of the Energy Policy Office	Director of the Federal Energy Office; 1973–1974	Succeeded by John C. Sawhill
Preceded by George P. Shultz	United States Secretary of the Treasury; 1974–1977	Succeeded by Michael Blumenthal
Sporting positions
Preceded by Robert Kane	President of the United States Olympic Committee; 1981–1985	Succeeded by Jack Kelly
