= Project on Indigenous Governance and Development =

The Project on Indigenous Governance and Development, previously named the Harvard Project on American Indian Economic Development, also known as the Harvard Project, was founded in 1987 at Harvard Kennedy School at Harvard University. The project's stated goals are to understand and foster the conditions under which sustained, self-determined social and economic development is achieved among American Indian nations through applied research and service. The project also administers tribal awards programs, provides support for students, and conducts research and pro-bono advertising on the behalf of tribal governments.

== Overview of the Harvard Project ==
The Harvard Project on Indian Economic Development was founded by Professors Stephen Cornell and Joseph P. Kalt at Harvard University in 1987. The Harvard Project on American Indian Economic Development (Harvard Project) is housed within the Ash Center for Democratic Governance and Innovation at the Harvard Kennedy School, Harvard University. The Harvard Project aims to promote research to understand and foster the conditions under which sustained, self-determined social and economic development is achieved among the American Indian nations. The Harvard Project's core activities include research, education, and the administration of a tribal governance awards program. In all of its activities, the Harvard Project collaborates with the Native Nations Institute for Leadership, Management, and Policy at the University of Arizona. The Harvard Project is also formally affiliated with the Harvard University Native American Program.

Joseph Kalt served as director of the Harvard Project until his retirement in 2025. The current director of the Harvard Project is Randall Kekoa Akee.

== Honoring Nations ==
The Harvard Project also administers Honoring Nations, a national awards program that identifies and rewards effective and innovative programs in tribal self-governance. Honoring Nations selects programs from a wide range of subject areas, including conservation, education, governmental and judicial reform, and other social, cultural, and economic programs. To date, it has awarded 148 programs from over 100 tribal nations, including the Nez Perce Tribe, the Cherokee Nation, and the Citizen Potawami Nation.

The awards program was established in 1998, and accepts applications from American Indian tribal governments that wish to showcase their own effective and innovative governance programs. Up to ten nominees are chosen by a board of directors to receive "Honors" or "High Honors," each of which comes with a financial reward. Nominees are evaluated based on factors such as their effectiveness, significance to tribal sovereignty, cultural relevance, transferability, and sustainability. These programs are then used as the basis for reports, policy analyses, case studies, and other materials produced by the Harvard Project and its partners, which are then disseminated to tribal leaders, academic institutions, and the media.

== Other best practice awards programs ==
The success of the Honoring Nations program is credited for inspiring similar programs honoring Indigenous governance programs in Canada and Australia.
