= John Brademas =

American politician and educator (1927–2016)

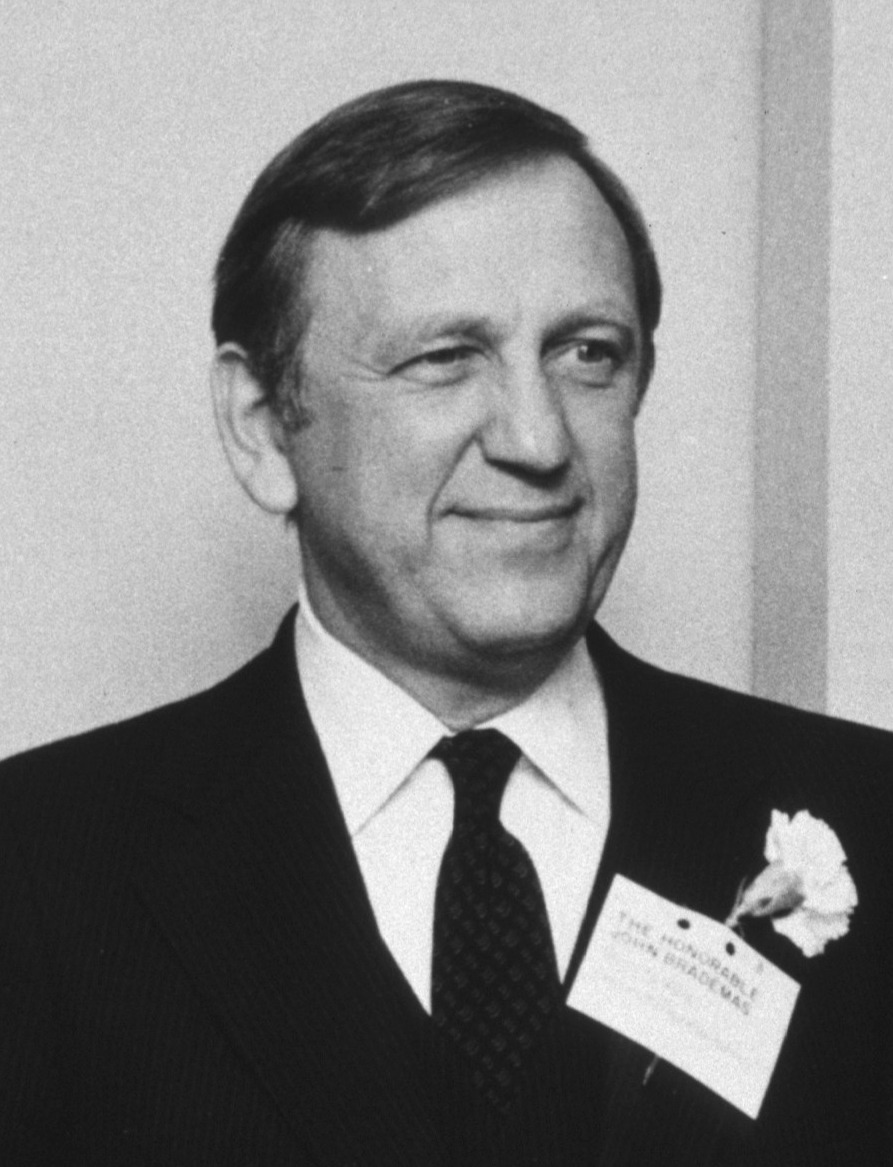
- Brademas in 1980

13th President of New York University
- In office 1981–1991
- Preceded by: Ivan L. Bennett Jr. (acting)
- Succeeded by: L. Jay Oliva

House Majority Whip
- In office January 3, 1977 – January 3, 1981
- Leader: Tip O'Neill
- Preceded by: John J. McFall
- Succeeded by: Tom Foley

House Democratic Chief Deputy Whip
- In office January 3, 1973 – January 3, 1977
- Leader: Carl Albert
- Preceded by: Position established
- Succeeded by: Dan Rostenkowski

Member of the U.S. House of Representatives from Indiana's 3rd district
- In office January 3, 1959 – January 3, 1981
- Preceded by: F. Jay Nimtz
- Succeeded by: John P. Hiler

Personal details
- Born: Stephen John Brademas Jr. March 2, 1927 Mishawaka, Indiana, U.S.
- Died: July 11, 2016 (aged 89) New York City, New York, U.S.
- Resting place: Congressional Cemetery
- Party: Democratic
- Education: Harvard University (BA); Brasenose College, Oxford (MA, DPhil)
- Brademas's voice Brademas on balancing the FY1981 federal budget. Recorded March 19, 1980

Academic background
- Thesis: The Sinarquista Movement in Mexico: Its Implications for the United States (1949)

Stephen John Brademas Jr. (March 2, 1927 – July 11, 2016) was an American politician and educator originally from Indiana. He served as Majority Whip of the United States House of Representatives for the Democratic Party from 1977 to 1981 at the conclusion of a twenty-year career as a member of the United States House of Representatives. In addition to his major legislative accomplishments, including much federal legislation pertaining to schools, arts, and the humanities, he served as the 13th president of New York University (NYU) from 1981 to 1992, and was a member of and subsequently the chairman of the board of the Federal Reserve Bank of New York. In addition he was a board member of the New York Stock Exchange and the Rockefeller Foundation.

== Early life and career ==
The oldest of four children, Brademas was born in 1927 to Stephen John Brademas, a Greek immigrant father, and the former Beatrice Goble, an American mother, in Mishawaka, Indiana. His father ran a restaurant and his mother was an elementary school teacher. He spent summers with his maternal grandfather, who was the state superintendent of schools in Canada, and possessed a large library.

Brademas graduated as valedictorian from Central High School in South Bend, Indiana. He served two years in the U.S. Navy, stationed in Milwaukee, Wisconsin. He attended Harvard University, from which he graduated with an A.B. magna cum laude and Phi Beta Kappa and where he was affiliated with Adams House. His Harvard thesis, The Sinarquista Movement in Mexico: Its Implications for the United States, was published in April 1949. He won a Rhodes Scholarship and attended Brasenose College, Oxford, from which he received his D.Phil. in Social Studies.

== Congressional service ==
Brademas served as the U.S. representative from Indiana's 3rd congressional district for 22 years (1959–81), the last four as House majority whip. While in Congress, he was a member of the Committee on Education and Labor, where he played a leading role in writing most of the federal legislation enacted during that time concerning schools, colleges and universities; services for the elderly and the handicapped; libraries and museums; and the arts and humanities.

Brademas holds the distinction of being the first Greek-American member of Congress, preceding, among others, Olympia Snowe, Paul Tsongas and Paul Sarbanes.

Cosponsor of the 1965 legislation creating the National Endowment for the Arts (NEA) and the National Endowment for the Humanities (NEH), Brademas for ten years chaired the congressional subcommittee with jurisdiction over them. He was chief House sponsor of the Arts, Humanities and Cultural Affairs Act; Arts and Artifacts Indemnity Act; Museum Services Act; Library Services and Construction Act; National Commission on Libraries and Information Services Act; Education for All Handicapped Children Act; Alcohol and Drug Abuse Education Act; and International Education Act. He was also a major co-author of the Elementary and Secondary Education Act of 1965; the Higher Education Acts of 1972 and 1976, which focused on student aid; and the measure creating the National Institute of Education.

In December 1963, the Studebaker Corporation closed its South Bend, Indiana, automobile manufacturing plants, putting more than 5,000 people out of work. Brademas was instrumental in helping the South Bend area recover from the Studebaker closing through his contacts in Washington. In 1964, after receiving an $81 million contract from the government, Kaiser Jeep Corporation purchased the Chippewa Avenue truck plant from Studebaker, and put a sizable number of people back to work building military and postal vehicles. Today, although the Chippewa plant is no longer in use, AM General, successor to Kaiser Jeep and American Motors Corporation, produces the military Humvee and the Hummer H1 and H2 in Mishawaka, Indiana, just east of South Bend. This would have been nearly impossible without the work of John Brademas in the mid-1960s. Brademas was defeated for reelection on November 4, 1980, by Republican John Hiler in an outcome that was driven largely by the national political climate and the Ronald Reagan vs. Jimmy Carter presidential election campaign.

== Career in education ==
After leaving Congress, Brademas moved to New York and served as president of New York University from 1981 to 1992. In 1990, he co-chaired the bipartisan independent commission mandated by Congress to review the grant-making procedures of the NEA. He was appointed by President Bill Clinton as chairman of the President's Committee on the Arts and the Humanities, and was also chairman of the National Endowment for Democracy, as well as a member of the Consultants' Panel to the Comptroller General of the United States.

Film actress Paulette Goddard left her multimillion-dollar estate to New York University in large part due to her friendship with Brademas.

== Foundations and boards ==
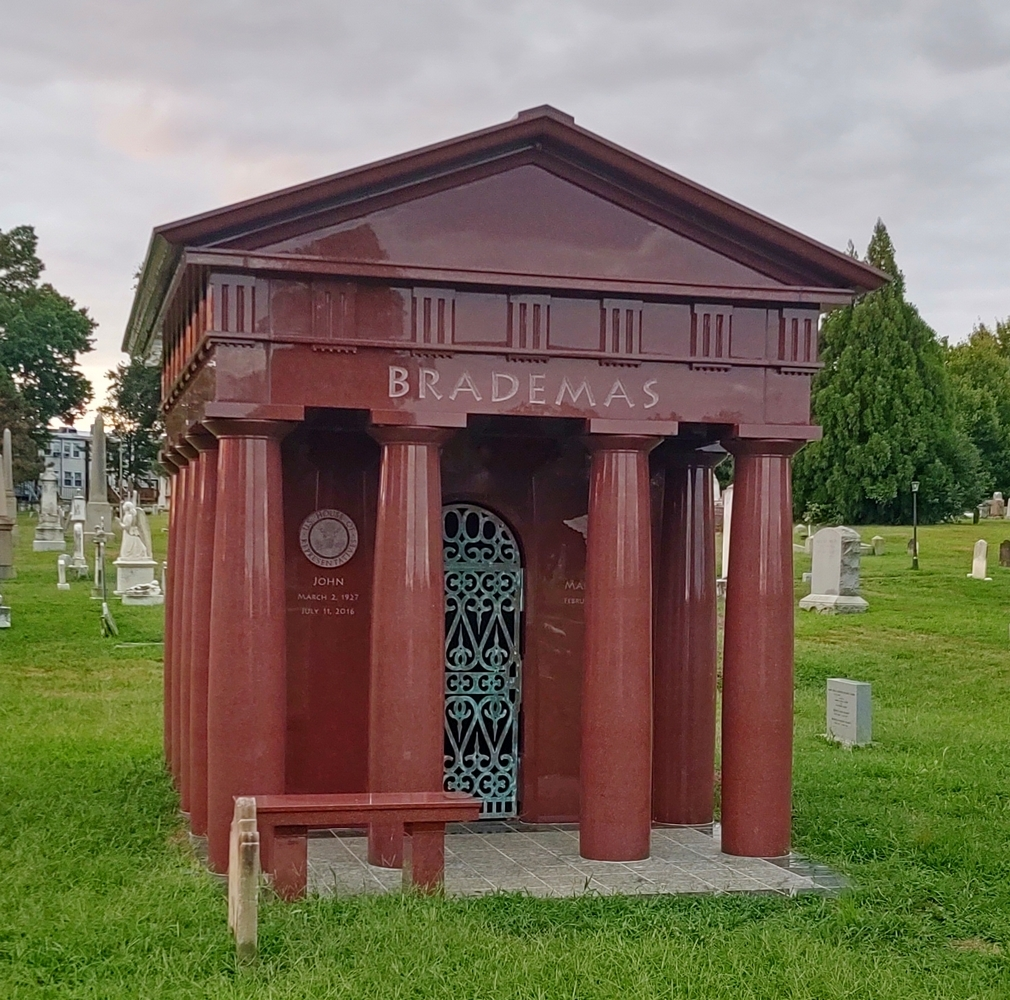
John Brademas Mausoleum at Congressional Cemetery

Brademas served on a number of boards and national commissions on subjects ranging from the arts to higher education, foreign policy, jobs and small business, historic documents and records, and science, technology and government.

He was the chairman of the American Ditchley Foundation and co-chaired the Center for Science, Technology and Congress at the American Association for the Advancement of Science in Washington, D.C.

Brademas served as chairman of the board of the Federal Reserve Bank of New York, as well as on the boards of Overseers of Harvard, New York Stock Exchange, Rockefeller Foundation and the Central Committee of the World Council of Churches. He is a fellow of the American Academy of Arts and Sciences and the Academy of Athens. He served on several corporate board as well as boards of the Alexander S. Onassis Public Benefit Foundation, American Council for the Arts, Center for National Policy and the Spanish Institute.

Brademas was awarded honorary degrees by 47 colleges and universities. He also received the annual Award for Distinguished Service to the Arts of the American Academy and Institute of Arts and Letters. The Middle Common Room of Brasenose College, Oxford, is located in the Brademas Room, which is named in honor of Brademas.

== Later life ==
On October 3, 2011, the King of Spain bestowed on John Brademas the Order of Isabella the Catholic, a Spanish civil order granted in recognition of services that benefit the country.

Brademas died on July 11, 2016, at the age of 89. He is interred at the Congressional Cemetery. He was survived by his wife Mary, a physician.

== Legacy ==
South Bend's main post office was officially named the "John Brademas Post Office" in his honor.

U.S. House of Representatives
Preceded by F. Jay Nimtz	Member of the U.S. House of Representatives from Indiana's 3rd congressional district 1959–1981	Succeeded by John P. Hiler
Preceded by John J. McFall	House Majority Whip; 1977–1981	Succeeded by Tom Foley
Party political offices
Preceded by Mike Mansfield	Response to the State of the Union address 1972; Served alongside: Carl Albert, Lloyd Bentsen, Hale Boggs, Frank Church, Thomas Eagleton, Martha Griffiths, John Melcher, Ralph Metcalfe, William Proxmire, Leonor Sullivan	Vacant Title next held by Mike Mansfield; 1974
New office	House Democratic Chief Deputy Whip; 1973–1977	Succeeded by Dan Rostenkowski
Academic offices
Preceded by Ivan L. Bennett Jr. Acting	President of New York University; 1981–1991	Succeeded by L. Jay Oliva
