= Schiff Hardin =

Schiff Hardin LLP
- Headquarters: Chicago
- No. of offices: 7
- No. of attorneys: more than 300
- Major practice areas: General practice
- Revenue: $227M
- Date founded: 1864; 162 years ago, in Chicago
- Founders: Charles Hitchcock and Charles Dupee
- Company type: Limited liability partnership
- Website: www.schiffhardin.com

Schiff Hardin LLP was a national law firm with more than 300 attorneys practicing out of seven offices nationwide — Ann Arbor, Chicago, Lake Forest, New York, Newport Beach, San Francisco, and Washington, DC. It was a general practice firm serving corporate clients. In 2022, Schiff Hardin merged with Arent Fox to form the firm of ArentFox Schiff.

== History ==
The firm was founded in 1864 as Hitchcock & Dupee and ranked as one of Chicago's oldest law firms. In its early years, it represented the Chicago City Railway Company and Chicago Transit Authority. In 1889, Hitchcock & Dupee gained Northern Trust as a client; the company continued to turn to Schiff Hardin for all legal advice until the Arent Fox merger. The firm acquired its current name in 2004.

Schiff Hardin opened a Washington, D.C. office in 1977. An office in New York City (1991) followed. 2002 brought a suburban Chicago office in Lake Forest. In 2007, the firm merged with Morgenstein & Jubelirer to open a San Francisco office, followed by an Ann Arbor, Michigan office in 2012.

== Notable cases ==
- Chicago Board Options Exchange — In the early 1970s, the firm created the legal structure of the CBOE. In June 2010, the firm represented the Chicago Board Options Exchange, Incorporated in its approximately $3 billion demutualization transaction, in which the CBOE converted from a member-owned Delaware non-stock corporation to a Delaware stock corporation and wholly owned subsidiary of a new parent holding company, CBOE Holdings, Inc.
- United States of America v. Conrad M. Black et al. — The firm represented Mark S. Kipnis, the former general counsel of Hollinger International, Inc., in this highly publicized trial.
- People v. Harper — Schiff Hardin represented Julie Rae Harper, a woman wrongfully convicted and imprisoned for the murder of her young son, at her retrial. This case generated considerable media attention after ABC-TV's 20/20 program ran a show about the case.
- Animal Legal Defense Fund v. Woodley — In a case that received nationwide attention, the Animal Legal Defense Fund (ALDF), represented by Schiff Hardin's Animal Law practice attorneys and North Carolina counsel, obtained a full and final judgment in Animal Legal Defense Fund v. Woodley in a case involving animal hoarding.

== Notable clients ==
AT&T Wireless Services, Inc.	Michael Jordan
Bunn-O-Matic Corporation	Laidlaw International, Inc.
CenterPoint Properties Trust	Lek Pharmaceuticals
Chicago Board Options Exchange	Newell Rubbermaid Inc.
Chicago Transit Authority	NiSource Inc.
Dorel Industries Inc.	Northern Trust
Eastman Kodak Company	Owens-Illinois, Inc.
Emaar Properties	Sanford
Geneva Pharmaceuticals, Inc. and Novartis	The Thermos Company
Insurance Auto Auctions, Inc.	Wittur Inc.
