= John C. Sawhill =

John Sawhill

12th President of New York University
- In office 1975–1979
- Preceded by: James McNaughton Hester
- Succeeded by: Ivan L. Bennett Jr.

Administrator of the Federal Energy Administration
- In office June 28, 1974 – December 18, 1974
- President: Richard Nixon; Gerald Ford
- Preceded by: Himself (Federal Energy Office)
- Succeeded by: Frank Zarb

Director of the Federal Energy Office
- In office May 9, 1974 – June 28, 1974
- President: Richard Nixon
- Preceded by: William E. Simon
- Succeeded by: Himself (Federal Energy Administration)

Personal details
- Born: John Crittenden Sawhill; June 12, 1936; Cleveland, Ohio, U.S.
- Died: May 18, 2000 (aged 63); Richmond, Virginia, U.S.
- Political party: Democratic (before 1973); Republican (1973–2000)
- Spouse: Isabel Van Devanter
- Education: Princeton University (BA); New York University (MA, PhD)

John Crittenden Sawhill (June 12, 1936 – May 18, 2000) was president and CEO of The Nature Conservancy and the 12th President of New York University (NYU).

Born in Cleveland, Ohio in 1936, Sawhill graduated from Princeton University's Woodrow Wilson School of Public and International Affairs in 1958. He earned a PhD in economics in 1963 from New York University, where he served as professor of economics. He was named president of New York University in 1975, serving until 1979. At a trying time in NYU's history, he received widespread acclaim for bringing about an academic and financial turnaround at the country's largest private university.

His research focused on the nonprofit sector, and he joined the Harvard Business School faculty in 1997 as part of the School's Initiative on Social Enterprise. His seminar Effective Leadership of Social Enterprises prepared students for leadership roles in nonprofit management.

Earlier he held several government positions during the Nixon, Ford and Carter administrations. Those included being Deputy Secretary of Energy; Chairman of the U.S. Synthetic Fuels Corporation; Administrator of the Federal Energy Administration (appointed by President Nixon, he resigned that position in October, 1974), and Associate Director for Natural Resources, Energy, Science and Environment in the Office of Management and Budget. In 1977, he was elected to the Common Cause National Governing Board.

During his ten-year tenure, The Nature Conservancy became the world's largest private conservation group and protected more than 7 million acres (28,000 km^{2}) in the United States alone.

Sawhill, a senior lecturer at Harvard Business School and president and CEO of The Nature Conservancy, died of complications from diabetes May 18, 2000 at the age of 63. His wife was Isabel Sawhill and his son was James W. Sawhill.

Political offices
Preceded by William E. Simon	Director of the Federal Energy Office; 1974	Succeeded by Himself as Administrator of the Federal Energy Administration
Preceded by Himself as Director of the Federal Energy Office	Administrator of the Federal Energy Administration; 1974	Succeeded by Frank Zarb
Academic offices
Preceded by James McNaughton Hester	President of New York University; 1975–1980	Succeeded by Ivan L. Bennett Jr. Acting
