= Isabel Sawhill =

American economist (born 1937)

Belle Sawhill
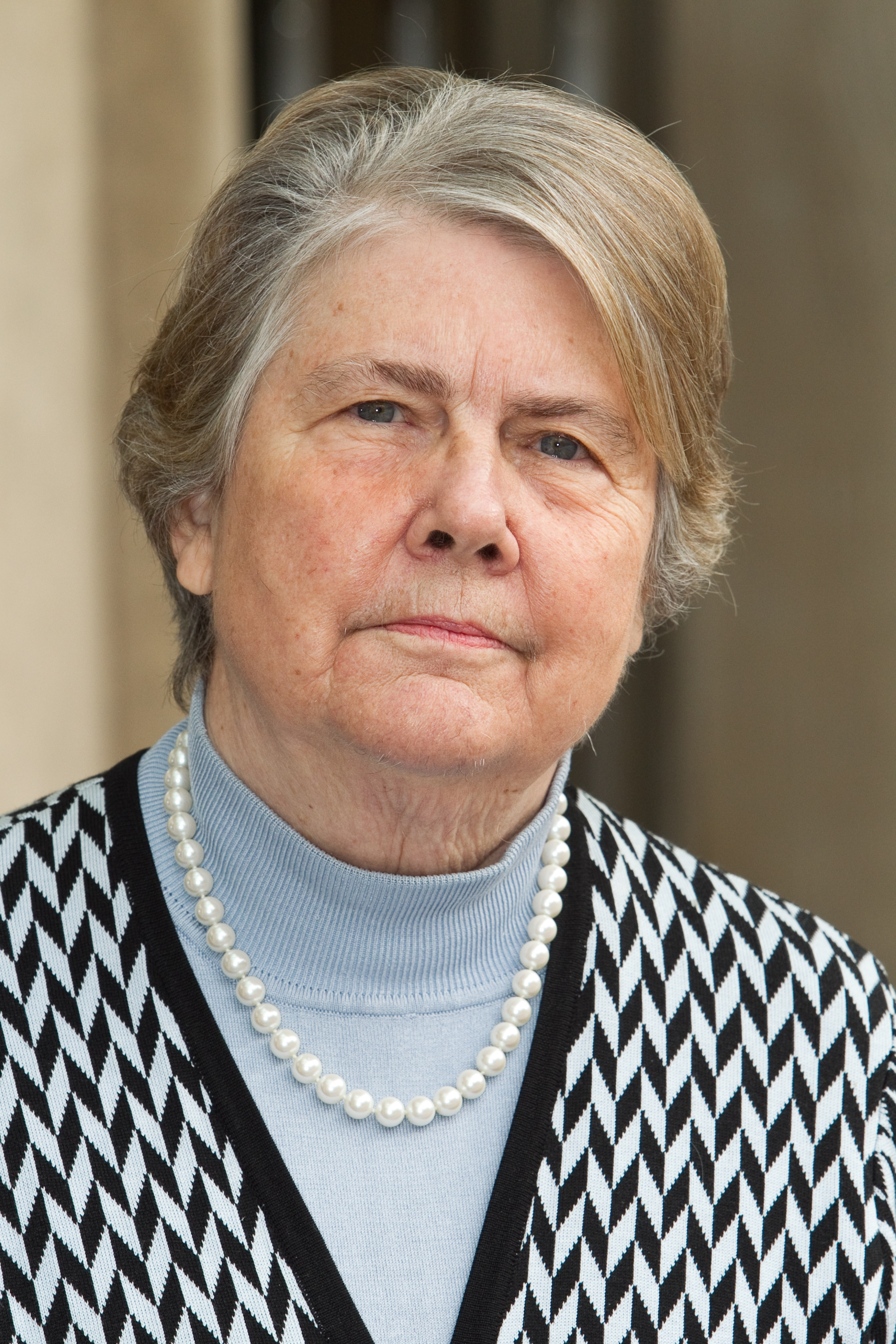
- Born: Isabel Van Devanter; April 2, 1937 (age 88); Washington, D.C., U.S.
- Education: Wellesley College; New York University (BA, MA, PhD)
- Spouse: John C. Sawhill (Died 2000)

Isabel Van Devanter Sawhill is a senior fellow at The Brookings Institution, where she formerly held the position of vice president and director of Economic Studies, among other duties. She has authored or co-authored many books, including Generation Unbound: Drifting Into Sex and Parenthood Without Marriage, and Creating an Opportunity Society with Ron Haskins. She won a Daniel Patrick Moynihan prize with Ron Haskins.

== Background ==
Sawhill received her Ph.D. in 1968 from New York University.

Prior to joining The Brookings Institution, Sawhill worked at the Urban Institute. She served as an Associate Director in the Office of Management and Budget during the first term of the Clinton Administration.

Sawhill co-founded the nonprofit organization The National Campaign to Prevent Teen and Unplanned Pregnancy and serves on other nonprofit boards. She is a senior editor of The Future of Children, a joint effort with Princeton University.

== Awards and recognition ==
- 2014, Exemplar Award from the Association for Public Policy Analysis and Management.
- 2016, Daniel Patrick Moynihan Prize (with Ron Haskins), from the American Academy of Political and Social Science.
- 2016, named a Distinguished Fellow by the American Economic Association.

== Bibliography ==
- Ron Haskins; Isabel Sawhill Creating an Opportunity Society, Washington : The Brookings Institution, 2009. ISBN 978-0815703228, OCLC 895414972
- One percent for the kids : new policies, brighter futures for America's children, Washington, D.C. : Brookings Institution Press, 2003. ISBN 978-0815777229, OCLC 51936907
- Generation Unbound: Drifting Into Sex and Parenthood Without Marriage Washington, D.C. : Brookings Institution Press, 2014. ISBN 978-0815725589, OCLC 879119526
- The Forgotten Americans: An Economic Agenda for a Divided Nation New Haven : Yale University Press, 2018. ISBN 978-0300230369, OCLC 1024154738
- Sawhill, Isabel V. (July 2019). "Capitalism and the future of democracy" (PDF). Economic Studies at Brookings. The Brookings Institution.
- Sawhill, Isabel V. (2008). "Poverty in America". In Henderson, David R. (ed.). The Concise Encyclopedia of Economics. Library of Economics and Liberty (2nd ed.). Liberty Fund. pp. 405–408. ISBN 978-0865976665.
