= James Thomas Lynn =

American politician (1927–2010)

James Lynn
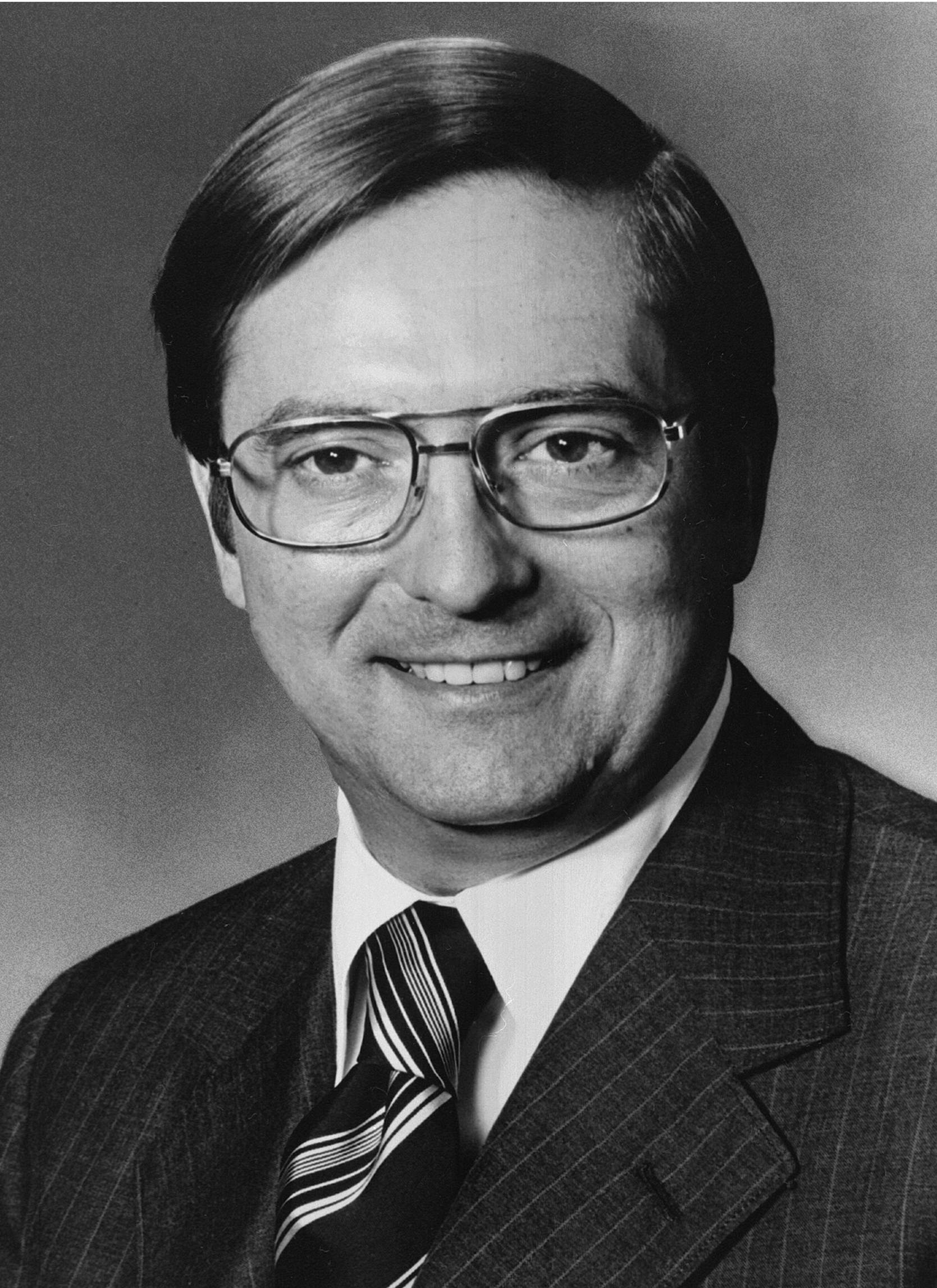

22nd Director of the Office of Management and Budget
- In office February 10, 1975 – January 20, 1977
- President: Gerald Ford
- Preceded by: Roy Ash
- Succeeded by: Bert Lance

4th United States Secretary of Housing and Urban Development
- In office February 2, 1973 – February 5, 1975
- President: Richard Nixon; Gerald Ford
- Preceded by: George Romney
- Succeeded by: Carla Hills

Personal details
- Born: February 27, 1927 Cleveland, Ohio, U.S.
- Died: December 6, 2010 (aged 83) Bethesda, Maryland, U.S.
- Party: Republican
- Education: Case Western Reserve University (BA); Harvard University (LLB)

James Thomas Lynn (February 27, 1927 – December 6, 2010) was an American government official who served as the 4th secretary of housing and urban development from 1973 until 1975 and as the 22nd director of the Office of Management and Budget from 1975 until 1977.

== Early life ==
Lynn was born in Cleveland, Ohio, on February 27, 1927, to Frederick Robert Lynn and Dorthea Estelle Lynn (née Petersen). In 1948, he graduated summa cum laude from Western Reserve University (now known as Case Western Reserve University), and in 1951 graduated magna cum laude from Harvard Law School. At Harvard Law School Lynn was the case editor of the Harvard Law Review.

== Career ==
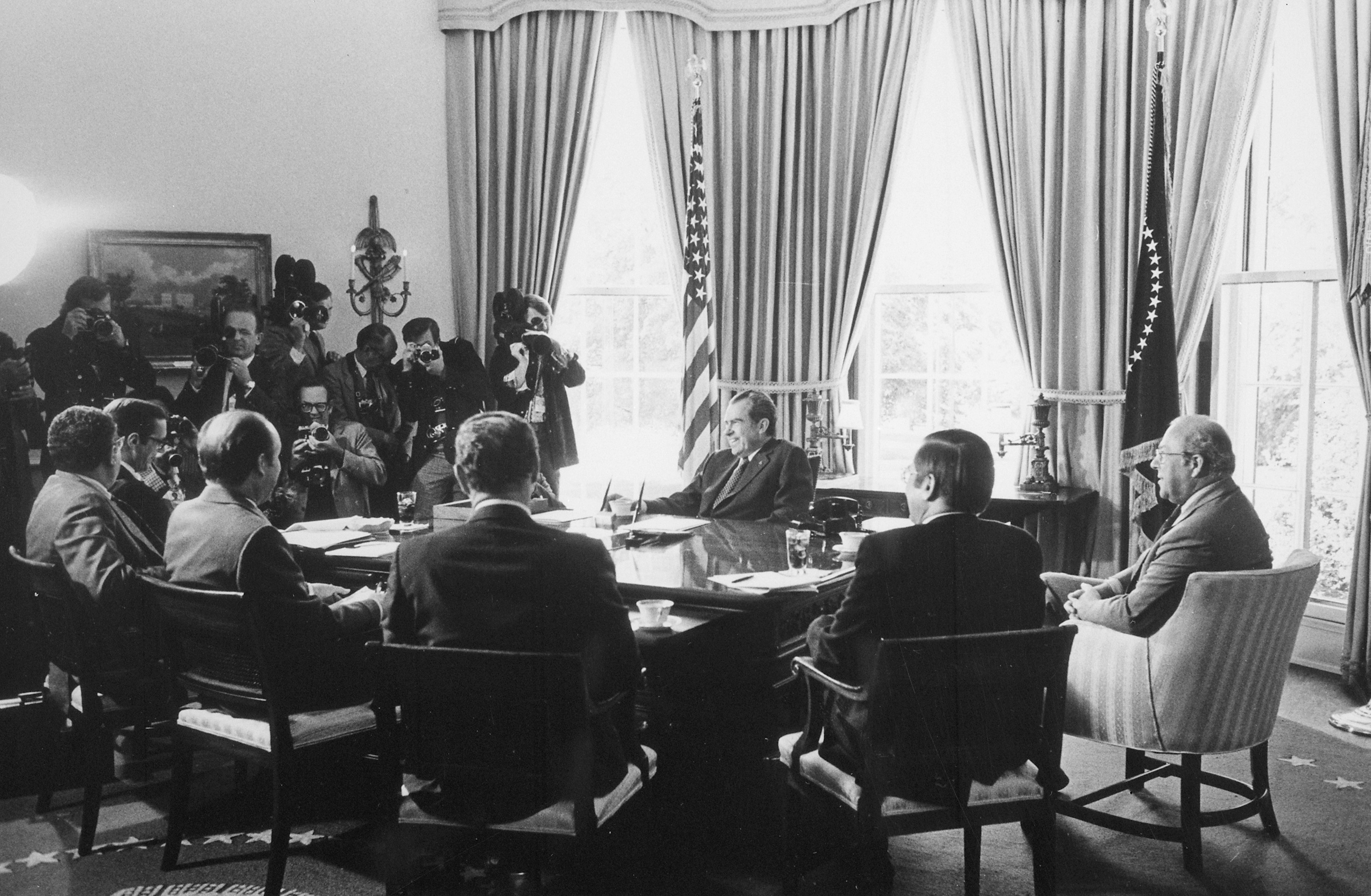
A meeting of Nixon Administration economic advisors and cabinet members on May 7, 1974. Clockwise from Richard Nixon: George Shultz, James T. Lynn, Alexander Haig, Roy Ash, Herbert Stein, and William E. Simon.

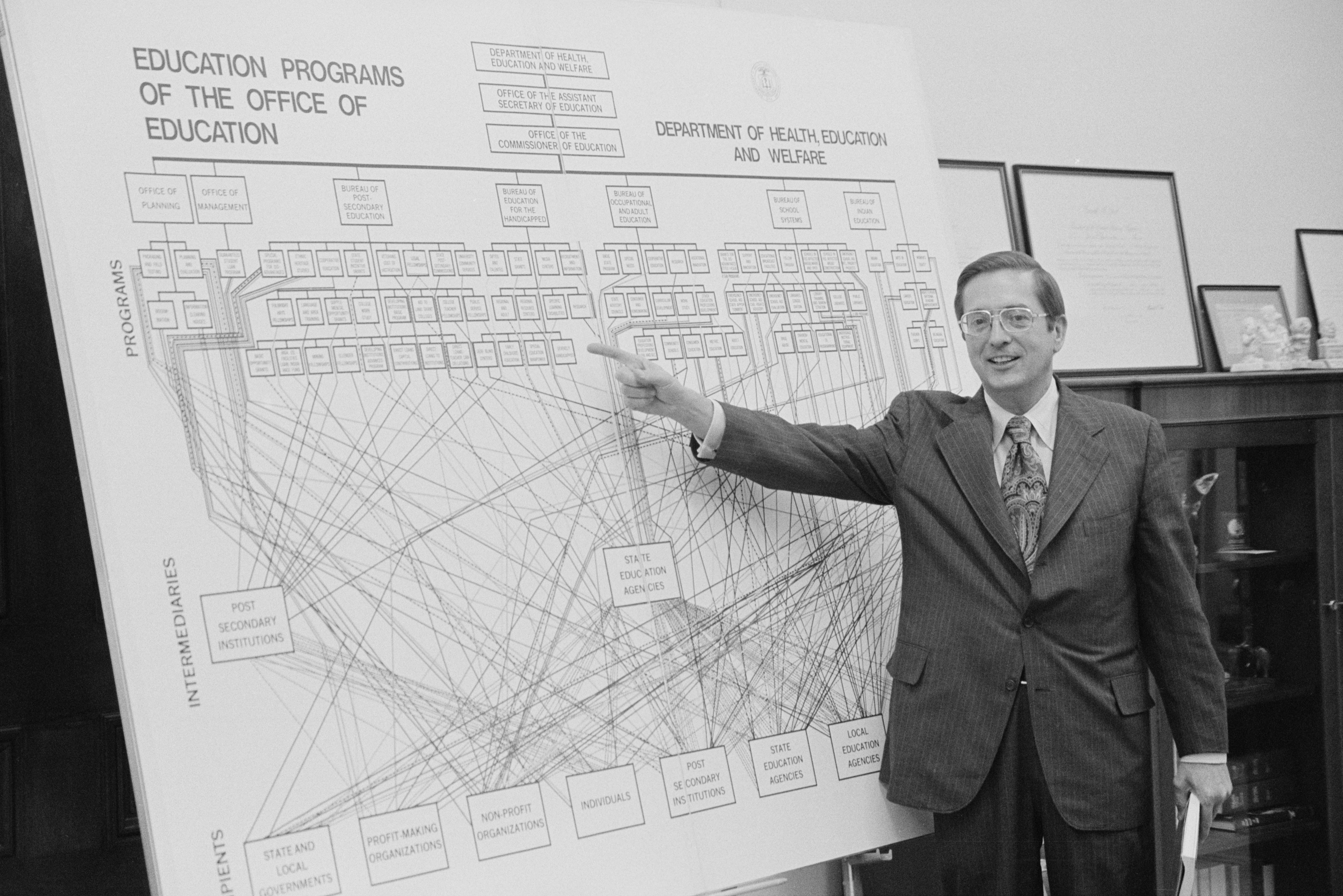
James T. Lynn as OMB director in 1976

He worked for Jones, Day, Cockley and Reavis, Cleveland's biggest law firm, became a partner in 1960 and was there until 1969, when he was named general counsel for the Department of Commerce. In 1971, he became Under Secretary of Commerce.

President Nixon appointed Lynn to serve as the U.S. Secretary of Housing and Urban Development from February 2, 1973 until February 5, 1975. President Gerald R. Ford appointed him to director of the Office of Management and Budget from February 10, 1975 until January 20, 1977.

=== Later life ===
Lynn joined the board of Aetna in the 1970s and served as its president and chairman in the 1980s. From 1978 to 1983, Lynn was head of the Federal City Council, a group of business, civic, education, and other leaders interested in economic development in Washington, D.C.

Lynn was also general counsel for the Republican National Committee in 1979 and the president of the James S. Brady Presidential Foundation in the early 1980s. In the 1990s, Lynn served on the Board on Science, Technology, and Economic Policy as well as on the boards of Pfizer and TRW.

Lynn was also co-chair of the Business Roundtable, was selected for the President's Commission to Study Capital Budgeting and most recently served on the Committee for a Responsible Federal Budget. Lynn was an honorary trustee of the Brookings Institution.

== Personal life ==
Lynn married the former Joan Miller on June 5, 1954. They had two daughters and one son: Marjorie Wilson, J. Peter Lynn and Sarah Hechler.

He died of a massive stroke at his home in Bethesda, Maryland, on December 6, 2010.

Political offices
Preceded by George Romney	United States Secretary of Housing and Urban Development; 1973–1975	Succeeded by Carla Hills
Preceded by Roy Ash	Director of the Office of Management and Budget; 1975–1977	Succeeded by Bert Lance
