= Politics of the United States during World War II =

The United States maintained its Constitutional Republic government structure throughout World War II. Certain expediencies were taken within the existing structure of the Federal government, such as conscription and other violations of civil liberties, including the internment and later dispersal of Japanese-Americans. Still, elections were held as scheduled in 1944.

== Overview ==
The United States entered World War II with the Administration that had been at the helm of the nation since 1932, that of Franklin Delano Roosevelt. This administration had been preparing for war for a while by the time of the attack on Pearl Harbor on December 7, 1941.

== President of the United States ==
President Franklin Delano Roosevelt and Vice President Henry A. Wallace won the election of 1940, and were at the helm of the nation as it prepared for and entered World War II. Roosevelt sought and won an unprecedented fourth term in office in 1944, but this time with Harry S. Truman as his Vice President. Roosevelt, who had been a victim of Guillain-Barré Syndrome early in life, died in April 1945, and Truman assumed the Presidency through the end of the war.

== Cabinet ==
- Secretary of State
  - Cordell Hull pre-war to November 1944
  - Edward Stettinius to war's ending a WW2
- Secretary of the Interior
  - Harold Ickes throughout the war
- Secretary of Commerce
  - Jesse H. Jones pre-war to June 1945
  - Henry A. Wallace to war's end
- Secretary of the Treasury
  - Henry Morgenthau Jr. pre-war to June 1945
  - Fred M. Vinson to war's end
- Secretary of Labor
  - Frances Perkins pre-war to June 1945
  - Lewis B. Schwellenbach to war's end
- Secretary of War
  - Henry L. Stimson throughout the war
- Secretary of the Navy
  - Frank Knox pre-war to May 1944
  - James V. Forrestal to war's end
- Secretary of Agriculture
  - Claude Wickard pre-war to June 1945
  - Anderson to war's end
- Postmaster General
  - Frank C. Walker pre-war to June 1945
  - Robert E. Hannegan to war's end
- Attorney General
  - Francis Biddle pre-war to June 1945
  - Tom C. Clark to war's end
- Director of the Federal Bureau of Investigation
  - J. Edgar Hoover throughout the war

== Executive Agencies ==
- Foreign Economic Administration under Director Crowley, formed September 1943 from the Office of Economic Warfare, the Office of Lend Lease Administration, and the Office of Foreign Relief and Rehabilitation Operations.
- Office of Price Administration under Administrators Henderson, Brown, and Bowles, formed April 1941 (originally named the Office of Price Administration and Civilian Supply).
- Office of War Mobilization and Reconversion under Chairmen Byrnes and Vinson, formed in May 1943 as the Office of War Mobilization.
- War Production Board under Chairmen Nelson and King, formed in January 1942 from the Office of Production Management and the Supply Priorities and Allocations Board.
- Economic Stabilization Board under Chairmen Byrnes and Vinson, formed in October 1942 as the Office of Economic Stabilization.
- War Manpower Commission under Chairman McNutt, formed in April 1942.
- United States Maritime Commission under Chairman Land.
- War Shipping Administration under Administrator Land, formed in February 1942.
- Office of Defense Transportation under Chairman Eastman, formed in December 1941.
- Petroleum Administration for War under Administrator Ickes, formed in December 1942.
- War Food Administration formed in December 1942.
- National War Labor Board under Chairman Davis, formed in January 1942.
- Office of Scientific Research and Development under Chairman Bush, formed in July 1941.
- Office of War Information under Chairman Davis, formed in June 1942.
- Office of Civilian Defense under Chairmen LaGuardia and Landis, formed in May 1941.

== Joint Chiefs of Staff ==
The Joint Chiefs were military officers, as opposed to the above, who were for the most part civilians.

- Chairman of the Joint Chiefs of Staff William D. Leahy
- Army Commander-in-Chief and Chief of Staff George C. Marshall
- Navy Commander-in-Chief and Chief of Operations Ernest King
- Army Air Force Commander Henry Arnold
- Marine Corps Commandant Alexander Vandegrift
- Army Air Force Chief of Staff Giles
- Army Ground Forces Commander Lear
- Army Service Forces Commander Somervell

In addition, the following offices reported to the Joint Chiefs of Staff:

- Operations Division, formerly the War Plans Division.
- Military Intelligence Division
- Office of Naval Intelligence
