= Richard Kauffman =

American government official (born 1955)

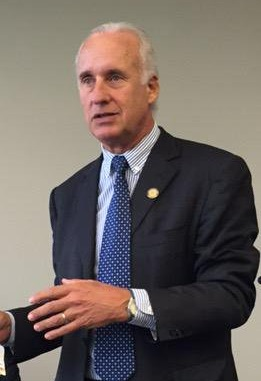

1st Chairman of Energy and Finance for New York
- In office February 2013 – May 2025
- Governor: Andrew Cuomo

Personal details
- Born: February 10, 1955 (age 71) Los Angeles, California, U.S.
- Education: Stanford University; Yale School of Management

Richard L. Kauffman (born February 10, 1955) is the first New York State "energy czar," officially referred to as the Chairman of Energy and Finance for New York in the administration of New York Governor Andrew Cuomo. In this role, Kauffman is New York State's most senior energy official, responsible for all aspects of energy policy and agency operation, and leads the state's "Reforming the Energy Vision" initiative.

== Early life and education ==
Kauffman attended Phillips Academy in Andover, Massachusetts and earned a bachelor's degree in African History at Stanford University. He earned a master's degree in international relations from Yale University, and a master’s in public and private management from the Yale School of Management.

== Private sector career ==
In 1993, Kauffman joined Morgan Stanley where he became vice chairman of the firm’s Institutional Securities Group, which provides institutions with services such as capital raising and financial advisory services including mergers and acquisitions advisory, restructurings, real estate and project finance, and corporate lending. Kauffman also served co-head of Morgan Stanley's Banking Department, and vice chairman and a member of the European Executive Committee of Morgan Stanley International.

In 2004, Kauffman became a partner at Goldman Sachs where he chaired the firm's Global Financing Group, and was a member of the Partnership Committee, Commitments Committee, and Investment Banking Division Operating Committee. In 2006, Kauffman assumed the role of Chief Executive Officer for Good Energies, Inc., one of the largest private equity funds specializing in clean energy.

== Obama administration ==
In 2011, Kauffman joined the U.S. Department of Energy to serve as Senior Advisor to Secretary Steven Chu, bringing private sector capital markets experience to the Department's efforts to address climate change and drive adoption of renewable energy and energy efficiency technologies. He was also responsible for overseeing the DOE Loan Programs Office from the Office of the Secretary at a time when the DOE Loan Program was receiving criticism for several troubled loans that had been made prior to Kauffman's involvement. As he and others predicted at the time, the DOE Loan Program's portfolio is now generating a net profit on funds loaned to clean energy companies.

== Chairman of Energy and Finance for New York ==
In January 2013, New York Governor Andrew Cuomo announced the appointment of Kauffman as the Chairman of Energy and Finance for New York, a newly created role with operational oversight for New York State's complete energy portfolio. In this capacity, Kauffman directly manages the New York Department of Public Service, the New York Power Authority, the Long Island Power Authority, and the New York State Energy Research and Development Authority (NYSERDA). In June 2013, he was appointed chair of NYSERDA’s board. Through coordinated management of these agencies, Kauffman leads the state's efforts to animate clean energy markets and deploy clean energy technology, referred to collectively as "Reforming the Energy Vision."

=== Reforming the Energy Vision (REV) ===
Kauffman leads New York State’s Reforming the Energy Vision (REV) initiative, which has the stated goal of creating "a cleaner, more affordable, more modern and more efficient energy system in New York, through the increased development of distributed energy resources, like rooftop solar, energy efficiency, and battery storage." REV refers to a diverse set of policy actions taken by New York State to remake its energy system, both by altering state-level energy regulatory structure, and by simultaneously providing evolving support for clean energy research, finance, and deployment.

==== REV regulatory proceeding ====
In April 2014, under the leadership of Kauffman and New York Public Service Commission Chair Audrey Zibelman, the NYPSC began a regulatory reform process for New York's electric utility business. Kauffman, Zibelman, and Department of Public Service (DPS) Staff have articulated a wide variety of policy objectives for the REV Regulatory Proceeding in an attempt to modernize the electrical grid system, including the promotion of more efficient energy use, deeper penetration of renewable energy resources such as wind power and solar power, and wider deployment of Distributed Energy Resources, such as microgrids, on-site power supplies, and energy storage. The reform also seeks to promote greater use of advanced energy management products to enhance demand elasticity and efficiencies, and monetize operational efficiency for the electrical grid. Also stated is a larger goal of transforming electric utilities into Distributed System Providers (DSPs) that can manage and appropriately value a diverse set of Distributed Energy Resources.

==== Clean Energy Fund (CEF) ====
Another component of the "Reforming the Energy Vision" initiative is the Clean Energy Fund (CEF) administered by NYSERDA, a $5 billion commitment to support renewable energy and efficiency markets under the new REV Regulatory Proceeding framework. When filing for the funds, NYSERDA requested, "greater levels of flexibility to move funds within each of the CEF portfolios" to respond to evolving energy market realities. The proposal received positive feedback from clean energy advocates including the Sierra Club.

==== NY Green Bank ====
In 2014, Kauffman and NYSERDA established NY Green Bank, a state-funded specialized financial entity designed to increase private investment in renewable energy and energy efficiency projects which have had difficulty accessing financing. NY Green Bank has the stated goal of facilitating financing of more reliable and efficient energy and reducing greenhouse gas emissions. It also seeks to address market barriers in clean energy financing markets and increasing overall capital availability through various forms of financial support. These support methods may include credit enhancement, project aggregation, and securitization. The organization has committed to working exclusively in partnership with private sector lenders to leverage its funds with private capital. NY Green Bank is the largest Green Bank in the nation.

==== NY-Sun ====
Governor Cuomo and Kauffman announced the NY-Sun solar program in April 2014, intended to expand deployment of solar capacity throughout the state. The $1 billion program is intended to provides long-term, stable incentive funding over a 10-year period to support photovoltaic (PV) solar projects throughout New York, with the ultimate goal of transitioning New York's solar industry to a sector that can function without subsidy support.

==== NY Prize ====
In February 2015, the Cuomo administration announced NY Prize, a $40 million "Community Microgrid" competition for New York. Microgrids are local energy networks that are able to separate from the larger electric grid during extreme weather events or emergencies, and provide power to the grid when needed. Microgrid technology can combine solar, wind, hydro or combined heat and power systems for local power generation.

== Board memberships and awards ==
In 2014, Kauffman was listed as one of Fortune Magazine's World's Top 25 Eco-Innovators alongside notable figures including Elon Musk and Bill McKibben.

Kauffman has served as Chairman of the Board of Levi Strauss & Co., as well as on the boards organizations including the Brookings Institution, the Wildlife Conservation Society, The New School, the Alvin Ailey American Dance Theater, and the New York Philharmonic. He has served on the Yale School of Management Board of Advisors, and is currently Co-Chair of the Yale Center for Business and the Environment Advisory Board where he also teaches. He also serves on the board of the Wallace Foundation and is a member of the Council on Foreign Relations.
