= Susan Berresford =

American foundation executive

Susan Vail Berresford (born 1943) is an American foundation executive. She was the president of the Ford Foundation from 1996-2007. Since November 2008 she has worked as a philanthropy consultant out of the offices of The New York Community Trust.

== Education ==
Susan Vail Berresford was born in 1943 and attended the Brearley School in New York City. She attended Vassar College for two years and then transferred to study American history at Radcliffe College, where she graduated cum laude in 1965.

== Career ==
Berresford served as a program officer for the Neighborhood Youth Corps from 1965 until 1967. In 1967-68, she worked for the Manpower Career Development Agency.

Berresford joined the Ford Foundation in 1970 as a project assistant in the Division of National Affairs. Between 1972 and 1980 she served as a program officer in that division. In 1980 she was named officer in charge of the foundation's women's programs. She became vice president for the foundation's U.S. and International Affairs programs in 1981, and subsequently served as vice president of the Program Division in charge of worldwide programming. She later became executive vice president and chief operating officer of the foundation before being elected the first female president of the foundation on April 3, 1996.

In 2003, she co-founded the United States Artists and is currently a trustee. In 2019, the philanthropic foundation founded the Berresford Prize which recognizes a cultural practitioner for their work for artists.

Berresford joined the U.S. Fund for UNICEF's national Board in October 2008.

=== Board of directors ===
Berresford is a board member of the Council on Foundations and the Japan Center for International Exchange (JCIE/USA), and a member of the Trilateral Commission and has served on the Boards of the Chase Manhattan Corporation and the Hermine and Robert Popper Foundation. She serves as an advisory board member of the Trinidad Trust Fund (California), and is a member of the Council on Foreign Relations. She is a trustee of The California Endowment and the Kaiser Family Foundation. She is the convener of the U.S.–Vietnam Dialogue Group on Agent Orange/Dioxin.

== Awards ==
She was elected a Fellow of the American Academy of Arts and Sciences in 1998.
