= Federal Energy Administration =

United States government organization

The Federal Energy Administration (FEA) was a United States government organization created in 1974 to address the 1970s energy crisis, and specifically the 1973 oil crisis. It was merged in 1977 with the Energy Research and Development Administration (ERDA) into the newly created United States Department of Energy.

== History ==
In 1973, the Organization of Petroleum Exporting Countries placed an oil embargo on nations perceived as assisting Israel in the Yom Kippur War. To combat the embargo, President Nixon established the Federal Energy Office (FEO) in December 1973, which was tasked with coordinating the American response to the embargo. In June 1974, the FEO was superseded by the FEA under the Federal Energy Administration Act of 1974 and Executive Order 11790. The FEA was tasked with managing fuel allocation, pricing regulation, and energy data collection and analysis. The Energy Research and Development Administration (ERDA) was created by the Energy Reorganization Act of 1974 and managed the energy research and development, nuclear weapons, and naval reactors programs.

In December 1975, Energy Policy and Conservation Act directed the FEA to change petroleum pricing regulations such that crude oil prices would rise gradually. Additionally, subject to congressional review, the FEA could now remove refined petroleum products from pricing controls. By June 1976, fuel oil, middle distillates, naphtha, and gas oils were no longer under pricing controls.

The Federal Energy Administration Act created the first U.S. agency with the primary focus on energy and mandated it to collect, assemble, evaluate, and analyze energy information. It also provided FEA with data collection enforcement authority for gathering data from energy producing and major consuming firms. Section 52 of the FEA Act mandated establishment of the National Energy Information System to "contain such energy information as is necessary to carry out the Administration’s statistical and forecasting activities."

The Department of Energy Organization Act of 1977 created the United States Department of Energy (USDOE), which merged ERDA and FEA under USDOE. It also created the Energy Information Administration as the primary federal government authority on energy statistics and analysis.

== Leaders ==
Denotes acting capacity.

=== National Energy Office ===
Name	Start	End	President(s)
Charles DiBona	April 18, 1973	July 16, 1973	Richard Nixon (1969–1974)

=== Energy Policy Office ===
Name	Start	End	President(s)
John Love	July 16, 1973	December 4, 1973	Richard Nixon (1969–1974)

=== Federal Energy Office ===
Name	Start	End	President(s)
William Simon	December 4, 1973	May 9, 1974	Richard Nixon (1969–1974)
John Sawhill	May 9, 1974	June 28, 1974	Richard Nixon (1969–1974)

=== Federal Energy Administration ===
Name	Start	End	President(s)
John Sawhill	June 28, 1974	December 18, 1974	Richard Nixon (1969–1974)
John Sawhill	June 28, 1974	December 18, 1974	Gerald Ford (1974–1977)
Frank Zarb	December 18, 1974	January 15, 1977	Gerald Ford (1974–1977)
Gorman Smith; Acting	January 15, 1977	February 5, 1977	Jimmy Carter (1977–1981)
John O'Leary	February 5, 1977	September 30, 1977	Jimmy Carter (1977–1981)

Andrew Gibson was nominated to succeed Sawhill in 1974, but was withdrawn before the Senate had a chance to act on it.

== Deputy Administrators ==
- John Sawhill (December 4, 1973 – April 17, 1974)
- Eric Zausner (December 18, 1974 – Designated Acting July 31, 1976)
- John Hill (Early 1975 – July 1976)
- David Bardin (May 1977 – September 30, 1977)
- Gorman Smith, Acting (February 1977 – June 1977)
