= List of Hofstra University honorary degree recipients =

This is a list of notable honorary degree recipients from Hofstra University in New York.

== Key ==
| denotes alumni of Hofstra |

== 1940s ==
| Recipient | Year | Notability |
|---|---|---|
| Robert Moses | 1948 | New York Park commissioner and chairman of the Long Island State Park Commission |
| Trygve Lie | 1949 | United Nations secretary-general |
| Walter Bedell Smith | 1949 | Commander of the First Army and ambassador to Russia |

== 1950s ==
| Recipient | Year | Notability |
|---|---|---|
| Robert P. Patterson | 1950 | Former secretary of war |
| Dwight D. Eisenhower | 1950 | President of Columbia University and former Army chief of staff |
| Aymar Embury II | 1951 | Architect of the Whitestone and Triborough bridges |
| William Henry Harrison | 1951 | Head of the National Defense Production Administration |
| Harry Woodburn Chase | 1951 | Chancellor of New York University |
| Arthur S. Adams | 1952 | President of the American Council on Education |
| Cornelia Otis Skinner | 1952 | Writer and actress |
| John W. Davis | 1953 | Former United States ambassador to the United Kingdom |
| Carroll Vincent Newsom | 1953 | Associate commissioner for Higher Education in New York State |
| John Mason Brown | 1954 | Author and drama critic |
| Ward Melville | 1954 | Suffolk County industrialist and civic leader |
| Henry Townley Heald | 1955 | Chancellor of New York University |
| Joan Whitney Payson | 1955 | Philanthropist |
| Morris Bishop | 1956 | Professor of Romance Literature at Cornell University |
| Arthur A. Houghton Jr. | 1956 | President of Corning Glass Works |
| Harold Medina | 1957 | Judge on the U.S. Circuit Court of Appeals |
| Milislav Demerec | 1957 | Director of the genetics department of the Carnegie Institution of Washington |
| James E. Allen Jr. | 1957 | New York State education commissioner |
| Charles B. Stone III | 1957 | Boss of the Continental Air Command |
| Thomas G. Bergin | 1958 | Master of Timothy Dwight College |
| Livingston T. Merchant | 1959 | Assistant secretary of state for European Affairs |

== 1960s ==
| Recipient | Year | Notability |
|---|---|---|
| Eric A. Walker | 1960 | President of Pennsylvania State University |
| McGeorge Bundy | 1960 | Dean of faculty at Harvard University |
| Arthur H. Dean | 1961 | Chairman of Cornell University Board of Trustees |
| George Emlen Roosevelt | 1961 | Trustee of New York University |
| Adlai Stevenson II | 1961 | United States ambassador to the United Nations |
| Simon H. Rifkind | 1962 | Judge for the Southern District of New York |
| Sir Patrick Dean | 1964 | British representative to the United Nations |
| Louis H. Bauer | 1964 | Former head of the American Medical Association |
| John Cranford Adams | 1964 | Hofstra president |
| Albert L. Nickerson | 1964 | Board chairman of the Mobil |
| Robert Goheen | 1965 | President of Princeton University |
| Henry Viscardi Jr. | 1965 | Founder and president of Abilities Inc. |
| George L. Cadigan | 1965 | Bishop of the Episcopal Diocese of Missouri |
| Martin Luther King Jr. | 1965 | President of the Southern Christian Leadership Conference |
| Jacob Javits | 1966 | United States senator from New York |
| Henry Fairfield Osborn Jr. | 1966 | President of the New York Zoological Society |
| Stewart Udall | 1966 | United States secretary of the interior |
| Harry Frank Guggenheim | 1967 | Editor and publisher of Newsday |
| August Heckscher II | 1967 | Parks commissioner of New York City |
| James McNaughton Hester | 1967 | 11th president of New York University |
| Broadus Mitchell | 1967 | Economics professor at Hofstra |
| Robert G. Vosper | 1967 | Former president of the American Library Association |
| Sidney Dillon Ripley | 1968 | Secretary of the Smithsonian Institution |
| James Pitman | 1969 | Former member of Parliament |
| Edward J. Speno | 1969 | Member of the New York State Senate |
| Mary E. Switzer | 1969 | Administrator of the Social and Rehabilitation Service for the US Department of Health, Education and Wellness |
| George H. Williams | 1969 | President of American University |

== 1970s ==
| Recipient | Year | Notability |
|---|---|---|
| Elizabeth Koontz | 1970 | First African-American president of the National Education Association |
| Eugene Nickerson | 1970 | County executive of Nassau County |
| Jacques Piccard | 1970 | Swiss oceanographer |
| James Herman Robinson | 1970 | Founder of Operation Crossroads Africa |
| Joan Ganz Cooney | 1971 | Co-founder of Sesame Workshop |
| Eleazar de Carvalho | 1971 | Music director of the Saint Louis Symphony Orchestra, Hofstra professor |
| John W. Gardner | 1971 | Former U.S. Secretary of Health, Education, and Welfare |
| Nancy Hanks | 1971 | Chairman of the National Endowment for the Arts |
| Bill Moyers | 1971 | Former White House press secretary |
| Chiang Yee | 1971 | Professor of Chinese at Columbia University |
| Andrew Heiskell | 1972 | Chairman and CEO of Time Inc. |
| William J. McGill | 1972 | 16th president of Columbia University |
| Howard A. Rusk | 1972 | Founder of the Rusk Institute of Rehabilitation Medicine |
| Tom C. Clark | 1973 | Former associate justice of the Supreme Court of the United States |
| Elias James Corey | 1974 | Professor of Organic Chemistry at Harvard University |
| Clark Kerr | 1974 | Former president of the University of California |
| Cy Leslie | 1974 | Founder and president of MGM/UA Home Entertainment Group |
| Robert Nisbet | 1974 | Albert Schweitzer Chair of Humanities at Columbia University |
| Alan Pifer | 1974 | President of the Carnegie Corporation |
| Alan Schneider | 1974 | Theatre director |
| B.F. Skinner | 1974 | Professor of Psychology at Harvard University |
| Robert Coles | 1975 | Professor at Harvard Medical School |
| John Houseman | 1975 | Actor, producer |
| Aryeh Neier | 1975 | Co-founder of Human Rights Watch |
| James Pitman | 1975 | Chief of the Department of Medicine at Winthrop University Hospital |
| Joachim Prinz | 1975 | Former president of the American Jewish Congress |
| Walter Sullivan | 1975 | Professor of English at Vanderbilt University |
| Elie Wiesel | 1975 | Holocaust survivor, author of Night |
| Frank Zarb | 1975 | Administrator of the Federal Energy Administration |
| Daniel Patrick Moynihan | 1976 | United States ambassador to the United Nations |
| James Watson | 1976 | Director of the Cold Spring Harbor Laboratory |
| Francis Ford Coppola | 1977 | Film director |
| William Atwood | 1978 | Former United States ambassador to Guinea and Kenya |
| William M. Batten | 1978 | Chairman of the New York Stock Exchange |
| Mary Calderone | 1978 | President and co-founder of Sex Information and Education Council of the United States |
| Robert Abrams | 1979 | Attorney general of New York |

== 1980s ==
| Recipient | Year | Notability |
|---|---|---|
| Isaac Asimov | 1980 | Professor of Biochemistry at Boston University |
| Arthur F. Burns | 1980 | Former chair of the Federal Reserve |
| Bernard S. Meyer | 1980 | Justice on the New York Court of Appeals |
| Eugene Odum | 1980 | Professor of Ecology at the University of Georgia |
| Tamara Dembo | 1981 | Professor emerita of Psychology at Clark University |
| Malcolm Forbes | 1981 | Publisher of Forbes magazine |
| Gerald Ford | 1981 | 38th president of the United States |
| Samuel Pierce | 1981 | United States Secretary of Housing and Urban Development |
| Felix Rohatyn | 1981 | Chairman of the Mutual Assistance Corporation |
| Neil Simon | 1981 | Playwright, screenwriter, actor |
| Sol Wachtler | 1981 | Justice on the New York Court of Appeals |
| Romare Bearden | 1982 | Artist |
| Courtney Blackman | 1982 | Governor to the Central Bank of Barbados |
| Françoise Gilot | 1982 | French painter |
| Jim Jensen | 1982 | Reporter |
| Robert Kibbee | 1982 | Chancellor of the City University of New York |
| Ray Kurzweil | 1982 | Inventor |
| Hugh Carey | 1983 | Former governor of New York |
| Al D'Amato | 1983 | United States senator from New York |
| A. Leon Higginbotham Jr. | 1983 | Judge of the United States Court of Appeals for the Third Circuit |
| Herbert Kelman | 1983 | Professor of Social Ethics at Harvard University |
| James Tobin | 1983 | Sterling Professor of Economics at Yale University |
| Sanford Weill | 1983 | Founder of the National Academy Foundation |
| Siggi Wilzig | 1983 | Holocaust survivor, advisor to Elie Wiesel |
| Maryanne Trump Barry | 1984 | Judge of the United States District Court for the District of New Jersey |
| Peter Drucker | 1984 | Clarke Professor of Social Science and Management at Claremont Graduate University |
| Alan Greenspan | 1984 | Economist |
| Theodore W. Kheel | 1984 | Attorney and labor mediator |
| Gloria Steinem | 1984 | Feminist and political activist |
| Robert T. Beyer | 1985 | Professor of Physics at Brown University |
| Ernest L. Boyer | 1985 | President of the Carnegie Foundation for the Advancement of Teaching |
| Tom Brokaw | 1985 | Anchor of NBC Nightly News |
| Raymond E. Brown | 1985 | Auburn Distinguished Professor of Biblical Studies at the Union Theological Seminary |
| Wilson Goode | 1985 | Mayor of Philadelphia |
| Maxine Greene | 1985 | William F. Russell Professor for the Foundations of Education at Columbia Teacher's College |
| Arthur Levitt | 1985 | Owner of Roll Call |
| Carl Sagan | 1985 | Astronomer |
| Budd Schulberg | 1985 | Screenwriter |
| Arnold Burns | 1986 | United States deputy attorney general |
| Peter Kalikow | 1986 | President of H. J. Kalikow & Co. |
| David Laventhol | 1986 | Editor of The Washington Post |
| Harold Arthur Poling | 1986 | President of the Ford Motor Company |
| Francis T. Purcell | 1986 | Nassau County executive |
| Arnold A. Saltzman | 1986 | Businessman |
| Barbara Walters | 1986 | Journalist |
| E.O. Wilson | 1986 | Professor of Evolutionary Biology at Harvard University |
| Rong Yiren | 1986 | Chairman of China International Trust and Investment Corporation |
| Warren M. Anderson | 1987 | Member of the New York State Senate |
| Stephen Jay Gould | 1987 | Professor of Geology at Harvard University |
| George C. Pratt | 1987 | Judge of the United States Court of Appeals for the Second Circuit |
| Jehan Sadat | 1987 | Former First Lady of Egypt |
| Les Wexner | 1987 | Chairman of Limited Brands |
| John Dingell | 1988 | Member of the U.S. House of Representatives from Michigan |
| Elliot Eisner | 1988 | Professor of Art and Education at the Stanford Graduate School of Education |
| Galway Kinnell | 1988 | Recipient of the Pulitzer Prize for Poetry |
| Norman F. Lent | 1988 | Member of the U.S. House of Representatives from New York |
| Elliot Richardson | 1988 | Former United States secretary of commerce |
| Olin Clyde Robison | 1988 | President of Middlebury College |
| Whitney North Seymour | 1988 | Attorney |
| Whitney North Seymour Jr. | 1988 | Co-founder of Farrar, Straus and Giroux |
| Edward J. Carlough | 1989 | President of the Sheet Metal Workers International Association |
| Nelson DeMille | 1989 | Author |
| John R. Dunne | 1989 | Member of the New York Senate from the 6th district |
| Marian Wright Edelman | 1989 | President and founder of Children's Defense Fund |
| Christopher Keene | 1989 | General director of the New York City Opera |
| Ralph S. Larsen | 1989 | CEO of Johnson & Johnson |
| Charles Rangel | 1989 | Member of the U.S. House of Representatives from New York |
| Tony Rosenthal | 1989 | Abstract sculptor |
| Preston Tisch | 1989 | Chairman of the Loews Corporation |

== 1990s ==
| Recipient | Year | Notability |
|---|---|---|
| Rand Araskog | 1990 | CEO of the ITT Corporation |
| Wyche Fowler | 1990 | United States senator from Georgia |
| Patricia Reilly Giff | 1990 | Author |
| Helen Hayes | 1990 | Actress |
| Damon Keith | 1990 | Senior judge of the United States Court of Appeals for the Sixth Circuit |
| Gil Noble | 1990 | Television reporter |
| Harold J. Raveché | 1990 | President of the Stevens Institute of Technology |
| George Vecsey | 1990 | Sports columnist for The New York Times |
| Mimi W. Coleman | 1991 | Trustee emerita of Hofstra |
| Helen Frankenthaler | 1991 | Abstract expressionist painter |
| Robert M. Johnson | 1991 | Publisher of Newsday |
| Geoffrey Palmer | 1991 | Former prime minister of New Zealand |
| Arthur M. Schlesinger Jr. | 1991 | Professor of Humanities at CUNY Graduate Center |
| Patricia Wald | 1991 | Former chief judge of the United States Court of Appeals for the District of Columbia Circuit |
| Owen Bieber | 1992 | President of the United Auto Workers |
| Elizabeth Coleman | 1992 | President of Bennington College |
| Dolores Cross | 1992 | President of Chicago State University |
| Sandy D'Alemberte | 1992 | President of Florida State University |
| Jean Dalrymple | 1992 | Theater producer |
| Marilyn French | 1992 | Author |
| J. Bruce Llewellyn | 1992 | Chairman of the Philadelphia Coca-Cola Bottling Company |
| John W. Money | 1992 | Professor of Medical Psychology at Johns Hopkins Hospital |
| Thomas R. Pickering | 1992 | United States ambassador to the United Nations |
| Harrison Salisbury | 1992 | Journalist |
| Susan H. Schulman | 1992 | Theater director |
| Walter Turnbull | 1992 | Founder of the Boys Choir of Harlem |
| Faye Wattleton | 1992 | President of the Planned Parenthood Federation of America |
| Tom Wicker | 1992 | Journalist |
| David Dinkins | 1993 | Mayor of New York City |
| Cynthia Gregory | 1993 | Prima ballerina |
| Shari Lewis | 1993 | Ventriloquist |
| Siegmund Spiegel | 1993 | Jewish architect, war hero, and activist; Holocaust survivor |
| Harold McGraw Jr. | 1993 | CEO of McGraw-Hill |
| Martin Theodore Orne | 1993 | Professor of Psychiatry and Psychology at University of Pennsylvania |
| L. William Seidman | 1993 | Head of the FDIC |
| Gus Tyler | 1993 | Columnist |
| Jack B. Weinstein | 1993 | Senior judge of the United States District Court for the Eastern District of New York |
| Ellen Futter | 1994 | President of the American Museum of Natural History |
| Murray Kempton | 1994 | Journalist |
| Nicholas P. Samios | 1994 | Director of the Brookhaven National Laboratory |
| Herbert Stein | 1994 | Economist |
| William L. Swing | 1994 | United States ambassador to Haiti |
| Robert Van Lierop | 1994 | Lawyer |
| Mario Van Peebles | 1994 | Film director |
| Melvin Van Peebles | 1994 | Film director |
| José A. Cabranes | 1995 | Judge of the United States Court of Appeals for the Second Circuit |
| Georgie Anne Geyer | 1995 | Journalist |
| Faith Hubley | 1995 | Animator |
| Edward Regan | 1995 | Former comptroller of New York |
| Phil Rizzuto | 1995 | New York Yankees shortstop |
| Michael Wigler | 1995 | Microbiologist |
| Jerome York | 1995 | CEO of IBM |
| Drew S. Days III | 1996 | Solicitor general of the United States |
| Charles W. Dryden | 1996 | Member of the Tuskegee Airmen |
| Gloria Foster | 1996 | Actress |
| Frederick Gluck | 1996 | Director at McKinsey & Company |
| Deborah Miller | 1996 | Adjunct professor of Education at New York University |
| David Salten | 1996 | Consultant to Hofstra's president |
| Frank Stanton | 1996 | Former president of CBS |
| Jan D. Timmer | 1996 | |
| Gary Becker | 1997 | Professor of Economics and Sociology at University of Chicago |
| Eddie Bracken | 1997 | Actor |
| Barbara Bush | 1997 | Former First Lady of the United States |
| George H. W. Bush | 1997 | Former president of the United States |
| Paul G. Hearne | 1997 | President of the Dole Foundation |
| Billy Joel | 1997 | Singer, songwriter |
| Michio Kaku | 1997 | Professor of Theoretical Physics at City College of New York |
| Lorraine Monroe | 1997 | Executive director and founder of the School Leadership Academy |
| LeRoy Neiman | 1997 | Artist |
| Edward Packard | 1997 | Author |
| Scott Ross | 1997 | Co-founder of Digital Domain |
| Martin Schröder | 1997 | Founder of Martinair |
| Stephen M. Schwebel | 1997 | President of the International Court of Justice |
| Percy Sutton | 1997 | Former Manhattan borough president |
| William vanden Heuvel | 1997 | Chairman of the Roosevelt Institute |
| John Bierwirth | 1998 | Former CEO of Grumman |
| Horace Hagedorn | 1998 | Founder of Miracle-Gro |
| Kitty Carlisle | 1998 | Actress |
| Owen H. Johnson | 1998 | Member of the New York Senate from the 4th district |
| Marvin Kalb | 1998 | Journalist |
| Judith Livingston | 1998 | First female member of the Inner Circle of Advocates |
| Eugene Ludwig | 1998 | Comptroller of the Currency |
| Jonathan D. Moreno | 1998 | David and Lyn Silfen University Professor at University of Pennsylvania |
| Bobby Muller | 1998 | Founder of International Campaign to Ban Landmines |
| Guy Stern | 1998 | Professor of German Literature and Cultural History at Wayne State University |
| Robert L. Bernstein | 1999 | Founding chair emeritus of Human Rights Watch |
| Schuyler Chapin | 1999 | Cultural Affairs commissioner of New York City |
| Larry Gelbart | 1999 | Creator of M*A*S*H |
| John R. McGann | 1999 | Bishop of Rockville Centre |
| Chuck Schumer | 1999 | United States senator from New York |
| Muriel Siebert | 1999 | First woman to own a seat on the New York Stock Exchange |
| Beatrice Wright | 1999 | Psychologist |

== 2000s ==
| Recipient | Year | Notability |
|---|---|---|
| Stephen E. Ambrose | 2000 | Biographer |
| Richard C. Casey | 2000 | Judge of the United States District Court for the Southern District of New York |
| Cy Coleman | 2000 | Composer |
| Maurice R. Greenberg | 2000 | CEO of American International Group |
| Kemp Hannon | 2000 | Member of the New York Senate from the 6th district |
| Jeffrey Lyons | 2000 | Theater critic |
| John Marburger | 2000 | Director of Brookhaven National Laboratory |
| Carl McCall | 2000 | Comptroller of New York |
| Margaret Thatcher | 2000 | Former prime minister of the United Kingdom |
| Jonathan Fanton | 2001 | President of the John D. and Catherine T. MacArthur Foundation |
| Judith Kaye | 2001 | Chief judge of the New York Court of Appeals |
| Joseph M. Margiotta | 2001 | Former New York state assemblyman |
| Sharon Oster | 2001 | Frederic D. Wolfe Professor of Management and Entrepreneurship at Yale School of Management |
| Bruce William Stillman | 2001 | Director of Cold Spring Harbor Laboratory |
| Susan Sullivan | 2001 | Actress |
| Joseph Bologna | 2002 | Actor |
| Woody Johnson | 2002 | Owner of the New York Jets |
| Carolyn McCarthy | 2002 | Member of the U.S. House of Representatives from New York's 4th district |
| Bernadette Peters | 2002 | Actress |
| Richard Rorty | 2002 | Professor of Comparative Literature at Stanford University |
| Jim Simons | 2002 | Founder of Renaissance Technologies |
| Renée Taylor | 2002 | Actress |
| Mary Jo White | 2002 | United States attorney for the Southern District of New York |
| Norm Coleman | 2003 | United States senator from Minnesota |
| Brian Dennehy | 2003 | Actor |
| Cokie Roberts | 2003 | Journalist |
| E. L. Doctorow | 2004 | Novelist |
| Lou Dobbs | 2004 | Television commentator |
| Robert Kaufman | 2004 | Screenwriter |
| Eliot Spitzer | 2004 | Attorney general of New York |
| Chris Albrecht | 2005 | CEO and chairman of HBO |
| Avi Arad | 2005 | Founder of Marvel Studios |
| Bill Clinton | 2005 | Former president of the United States |
| Michael J. Dowling | 2005 | President and CEO of North Shore-Long Island Jewish Health System |
| Michael Oxley | 2006 | Member of the U.S. House of Representatives from Ohio's 4th district |
| David Paterson | 2006 | Member of the New York Senate from the 30th district |
| Morton O. Schapiro | 2006 | President of Williams College |
| Sonia Sotomayor | 2006 | Judge of the United States Court of Appeals for the Second Circuit |
| Kenneth I. Chenault | 2007 | CEO of American Express |
| Christine M. Durham | 2007 | Chief justice of the Utah Supreme Court |
| David Neeleman | 2007 | CEO of JetBlue |
| Eric Schmertz | 2007 | Former dean of Hofstra Law School |
| Martin J. Sullivan | 2008 | CEO of American International Group |
| Thomas DiNapoli | 2009 | New York state comptroller |
| Wallace B. Jefferson | 2009 | Chief justice of the Texas Supreme Court |
| Nicholas Negroponte | 2009 | Founder of the MIT Media Lab |
| Paul H. O'Neill | 2009 | Former United States secretary of the treasury |
| Bob Schieffer | 2009 | Moderator of Face the Nation |

== 2010s ==
| Recipient | Year | Notability |
|---|---|---|
| Ajaypal Singh Banga | 2010 | President and CEO of Mastercard |
| Howard Dean | 2010 | Former governor of Vermont |
| Saul Katz | 2010 | President of the New York Mets |
| Jan Peter Balkenende | 2011 | Former prime minister of the Netherlands |
| Irwin Redlener | 2011 | Founder of the Children's Health Fund |
| Philip Rosenthal | 2011 | Creator of Everybody Loves Raymond |
| Douglas Brinkley | 2012 | Katherine Tsanoff Brown Chair in Humanities at Rice University |
| Jonathan Lippman | 2012 | Chief judge of the New York Court of Appeals |
| Les Moonves | 2012 | CEO of CBS Corporation |
| Nicholas Garaufis | 2013 | Judge of the United States District Court for the Eastern District of New York |
| Phil Schiliro | 2013 | Former White House director of Legislative Affairs |
| Jared Kushner | 2014 | CEO of Kushner Companies |
| Pelé | 2014 | Footballer and humanitarian |
| Peter Baker | 2015 | Chief White House correspondent for The New York Times |
| Herman A. Berliner | 2015 | Provost and senior vice president for Academic Affairs at Hofstra |
| Vernon Jordan | 2015 | Senior managing director of Lazard Frères & Co. LLC |
| Sallie Manzanet-Daniels | 2015 | Associate justice of the First Judicial Department |
| Kathleen Rice | 2015 | Member of the U.S. House of Representatives from New York's 4th district |
| Kathy Hochul | 2016 | Lieutenant governor of New York |
| Steve Israel | 2016 | Member of the U.S. House of Representatives from New York |
| Kevin J. Tracey | 2016 | CEO of Feinstein Institutes for Medical Research |
| Jill Biden | 2017 | Second Lady of the United States |
| Mariko Silver | 2017 | President of Bennington College |
| Madeline Singas | 2017 | District attorney of Nassau County |
| Janet DiFiore | 2018 | Chief judge of the New York Court of Appeals |
| Mike Massimino | 2018 | Professor of Mechanical Engineering at Columbia University |
| Scott Rechler | 2018 | CEO and chairman of RXR Realty |
| Wolf Blitzer | 2019 | Journalist |
| Marcus Brauchli | 2019 | Former executive editor of The Washington Post |
| Roger W. Ferguson Jr. | 2019 | Former vice chair of the Federal Reserve |
| Joe Morton | 2019 | Actor |

== 2020s ==
| Recipient | Year | Notability |
|---|---|---|
| Kathryn Marinello | 2021 | President and CEO of PODS |
| Eric Adams | 2022 | 110th mayor of New York City |
| Letitia James | 2023 | 67th attorney general of New York |
| Sandra Lindsay | 2023 | Vice president of Public Health Advocacy for Northwell Health |
