= Stephen T. Wegener =

Stephen Thomas Wegener (born November 20, 1952) is an American rehabilitation psychologist specializing in the psychology of pain management. His work seeks to improve function and reduce disability for persons with chronic illness and impairments, including occupational injuries, rheumatic disease, spinal cord injury or limb loss. He also develops cognitive-behavioral therapy and self-management to prevent or mitigate pain associated with disability, and examines psychological variables that can affect positive outcomes.

== Life and career ==
Wegener was born in St. Louis, MO and moved to Easton, Maryland in his late childhood. He earned his Bachelor of Arts degree in psychology in 1975 from Loyola College (now Loyola University Maryland). While there he was a member of the National Jesuit Honor Society and won the Whelan Psychology Medal. He completed a doctorate in clinical psychology at St. Louis University. He taught at University of Virginia before taking a position at Johns Hopkins. Wegener is currently Director of the Division of Rehabilitation Psychology at The Johns Hopkins School of Medicine.

In 2001 he was Distinguished Lecturer at the American College of Rheumatology /Association of Rheumatology Health Professionals Annual Scientific Meeting. In 2004 he was visiting professor at the Harry S. Truman Memorial Veterans' Hospital and at University of Missouri in Columbia, Missouri. He is on the board of the American Board of Rehabilitation Psychology since 2002 and has served as vice president since 2007. Wegener lectured in the Department of Rehabilitative Science at Hong Kong Polytechnic University in 2008. He was a Fulbright Scholar in 2008–2009.

== Selected publications ==
- Boult, C; Reider, L; Leff, B; Frick, KD; Boyd, CM; Wolff, JL; Frey, K; Karm, L; Wegener, ST; Mroz, T; Scharfstein, DO (Mar 2011). "The effect of guided care teams on the use of health services: results from a cluster-randomized controlled trial". Arch Intern Med. 171 (5): 460–6. doi:10.1001/archinternmed.2010.540. PMC 4450357. PMID 21403043.
- Wegener, ST; Castillo, RC; Haythornthwaite, J; Mackenzie, EJ; Bosse, MJ (June 2011). "Psychological distress mediates the effect of pain on function". Pain. 152 (6): 1349–57. doi:10.1016/j.pain.2011.02.020. PMID 21396777.
- Archer, KR; Wegener, ST; Seebach, C; et al. (September 2011). "The effect of fear of movement beliefs on pain and disability after surgery for lumbar and cervical degenerative conditions". Spine. 36 (19): 1554–62. doi:10.1097/BRS.0b013e3181f8c6f4. PMID 21270700.
- Skolasky, RL; Green, AF; Scharfstein, D; Boult, C; Reider, L; Wegener, ST (April 2011). "Psychometric properties of the patient activation measure among multimorbid older adults". Health Serv Res. 46 (2): 457–78. doi:10.1111/j.1475-6773.2010.01210.x. PMC 3064914. PMID 21091470.
- Kortte, KB; Gilbert, M; Gorman, P; Wegener, ST (Feb 2010). "Positive psychological variables in the prediction of life satisfaction after spinal cord injury". Rehabil Psychol. 55 (1): 40–7. doi:10.1037/a0018624. PMID 20175633.
- Skolasky, RL; Mackenzie, EJ; Riley, LH; Wegener, ST (December 2009). "Psychometric properties of the Patient Activation Measure among individuals presenting for elective lumbar spine surgery". Qual Life Res. 18 (10): 1357–66. doi:10.1007/s11136-009-9549-0. PMC 3561629. PMID 19916057.
- Wolff, JL; Giovannetti, ER; Boyd, CM; et al. (August 2010). "Effects of guided care on family caregivers". Gerontologist. 50 (4): 459–70. doi:10.1093/geront/gnp124. PMC 2908533. PMID 19710354.
- Kortte, KB; Veiel, L; Batten, SV; Wegener, ST (Feb 2009). "Measuring avoidance in medical rehabilitation". Rehabil Psychol. 54 (1): 91–8. doi:10.1037/a0014703. PMID 19618708.
- Schaffalitzky, E; NiMhurchadha, S; Gallagher, P; Hofkamp, S; MacLachlan, M; Wegener, ST (Jun 2009). "Identifying the values and preferences of prosthetic users: a case study series using the repertory grid technique". Prosthet Orthot Int. 33 (2): 157–66. doi:10.1080/03093640902855571. PMID 19367519.
- Wegener, ST; Mackenzie, EJ; Ephraim, P; Ehde, D; Williams, R (March 2009). "Self-management improves outcomes in persons with limb loss". Arch Phys Med Rehabil. 90 (3): 373–80. doi:10.1016/j.apmr.2008.08.222. PMID 19254599.
- Skolasky, RL; Mackenzie, EJ; Wegener, ST; Riley, LH (October 2008). "Patient activation and adherence to physical therapy in persons undergoing spine surgery". Spine. 33 (21): E784–91. doi:10.1097/BRS.0b013e31818027f1. PMC 6153437. PMID 18827683.
- Boult, C; Reider, L; Frey, K; Leff, B; Boyd, CM; Wolff, JL; Wegener, S; Marsteller, J; Karm, L; Scharfstein, D (2008). "Multidimensional geriatric assessment: back to the future early effects of "guided care" on the quality of health care for multimorbid older persons: a cluster-randomized controlled trial". J Gerontol A Biol Sci Med Sci. 63 (3): 321–7. doi:10.1093/gerona/63.3.321. PMID 18375882.
- Hofkamp, SE; Henrikson, CA; Wegener, ST (2007). "An interactive model of pain and myocardial ischemia". Psychosomatic Medicine. 69 (7): 632–9. doi:10.1097/PSY.0b013e318151a4bd. PMID 17766689.
- Boyd, C; Boult, C; Shadmi, E; Leff, B; Brager, R; Dunbar, L; Wolff, J; Wegener, ST (2007). "Guided Care for Multi-Morbid Older Adults". The Gerontologist. 47 (5): 697–704. doi:10.1093/geront/47.5.697. PMID 17989412.
- Kortte, KB; Falk, LD; Johnson-Greene, D; Wegener, ST (2007). "The Hopkins Rehabilitation Engagement Rating Scale: Psychometric Properties and Utility". Archives of Physical Medicine and Rehabilitation. 88 (7): 877–884. doi:10.1016/j.apmr.2007.03.030. PMID 17601468.
- Wegener ST (2006). Clinical Care in the Rheumatic Disease. American College of Rheumatology, ISBN 978-99901-17-61-5
- Ephraim, PL; MacKenzie, EJ; Wegener, ST; Dillingham, TR; Pezzin, LE (Mar 2006). "Environmental barriers experienced by amputees: the Craig Hospital Inventory of Environmental Factors-Short Form". Arch Phys Med Rehabil. 87 (3): 328–33. doi:10.1016/j.apmr.2005.11.010. PMID 16500165.
- Ephraim, PL; Wegener, ST; MacKenzie, EJ; Dillingham, TR; Pezzin, LE (Oct 2005). "Phantom pain, residual limb pain, and back pain in amputees: results of a national survey". Arch Phys Med Rehabil. 86 (10): 1910–9. doi:10.1016/j.apmr.2005.03.031. PMID 16213230.
- Darnall, BD; Ephraim, P; Wegener, ST; Dillingham, T; Pezzin, L; Rossbach, P; MacKenzie, EJ (Apr 2005). "Depressive symptoms and mental health service utilization among persons with limb loss: results of a national survey". Arch Phys Med Rehabil. 86 (4): 650–8. doi:10.1016/j.apmr.2004.10.028. PMID 15827913.
- Castillo, RC; MacKenzie, EJ; Wegener, ST; Bosse, MJ (2006). "Prevalence of Chronic Pain Seven Years Following Limb Threatening Lower Extremity Trauma". Pain. 124 (3): 321–329. doi:10.1016/j.pain.2006.04.020. PMID 16781066.
- Kortte, KB; Wegener, ST; Chwalisz, K (2003). "Anosognosia and denial: Their relationship to coping and depression in traumatic brain injury". Rehabilitation Psychology. 48: 131–136. doi:10.1037/0090-5550.48.3.131.
- Haythornthwaite, J; Wegener, ST; Benrud-Larsen, L; Clark, M; Dillingham, T; Cheng, L; de Lateur, B (2003). "Factors associated with willingness to try different pain treatments after a spinal cord injury". Clinical Journal of Pain. 19 (1): 31–38. doi:10.1097/00002508-200301000-00004. PMID 12514454.
- Palmer, S; Wegener, ST (Autumn 2003). "Rehabilitation psychology. Overview and key concepts". Md Med. 4 (4): 20–2. PMID 14725017.
- Yonan, C; Wegener, ST (2003). "Pain management in older persons". Rehabilitation Psychology. 48: 4–13. doi:10.1037/0090-5550.48.1.4.
- Martinez-Arizala, A; Barnes, G; Benjamin, S; Bowen, J; Cutter, N; de Lateur, B; Dietrich, D; Dowling, M; Griffin, J; Irani, D; Jorens, P; Kaplin, A; Katz, J; Kerr, D; Levy, C; Lucchinetti, C; Lynn, J; Mandler, R; McDonald, J; Morrison, L; Pardo, C; Pidcock, F; Ransohoff, R; Trovato, M; Wegener, S; Weinshenker, B; Wingerchuk, D; Vollmer, T (2002). "Proposed Diagnostic Criteria for Acute Transverse Myelitis". Neurology. 59 (4): 499–505. doi:10.1212/WNL.59.4.499. PMID 12236201.
- Wegener, ST; Haythornthwaite, JA (2001). "Psychological and behavioral issues in the treatment of pain after spinal cord injury". Topics in Spinal Cord Injury. 7: 73–83.
- Benrud-Larsen, LM; Wegener, ST (2000). "Psychosocial aspects of chronic pain in neurehabilitation populations: Prevalence, Severity and Impact". NeuroRehabilitation. 14: 127–137. doi:10.3233/NRE-2000-14302.
- Benrud-Larson, LM; Wegener, ST (2000). "Chronic pain in neurorehabilitation populations: Prevalence, severity and impact". NeuroRehabilitation. 14 (3): 127–137. doi:10.3233/NRE-2000-14302. PMID 11455075.
- Wegener, ST; Hagglund, K; Elliott, TR (2000). "A reply to Thomas and Chan: On psychological identity and training". Rehabilitation Psychology. 45: 74–80. doi:10.1037/0090-5550.45.1.74.
- Wegener, ST; Hagglund, K; Elliott, TR (1998). "On psychological identity and training: Boulder is better for rehabilitation psychology". Rehabilitation Psychology. 43: 17–29. doi:10.1037/0090-5550.43.1.17.
- Wegener, ST (1996). "The rehabilitation ethic and ethics". Rehabilitation Psychology. 41: 5–17. doi:10.1037/0090-5550.41.1.5.
- Wegener, ST; Elliott, TR (1992). "Pain Assessment in Spinal Cord Injury". The Clinical Journal of Pain. 8 (2): 93–101. doi:10.1097/00002508-199206000-00006. PMID 1633388.
- Elliott, T.R.; Wegener, S.T. (1992). "Chronic pain and spinal cord injury (Special section)". The Clinical Journal of Pain. 8: 86–122. doi:10.1097/00002508-199206000-00004.
- Wegener, ST (1991). "Psychological aspects of rheumatic disease: The developing biopsychosocial framework". Current Opinion in Rheumatology. 3 (2): 300–304. doi:10.1097/00002281-199104000-00015. PMID 2064910.
- Wegener, ST (Sep 1989). "Adherence: are we preaching the truth?". Arthritis Care and Research. 2 (3): 87–8. doi:10.1002/anr.1790020302. PMID 2487711.
- Wegener, ST (1989). "Treatment of sleep disturbance in rheumatoid arthritis: A single-subject experiment". Arthritis Care and Research. 1 (4): 205–210. doi:10.1002/anr.1790010405.
- Wegener, S.T. (1989). "Cognitive, psychological and behavioral issues in aging and arthritis". Scandinavian Journal of Rheumatology. 82: 39–49. doi:10.3109/03009748909101468. PMID 2700528.
- Stabenow, C; O'Leary, A; Wegener, ST; Fang, L; Brunner, C (1988). "A survey of arthritis rehabilitation in the United States". Archives of Physical Medicine and Rehabilitation. 69: 54–60.
- Kulp, CS; O'Leary, AA; Wegener, ST; Fang, WL; Brunner, CM (Oct 1988). "Inpatient arthritis rehabilitation programs in the US: results from a national survey". Arch Phys Med Rehabil. 69 (10): 873–6. PMID 3178455.
- Schwartz, DP; Large, HS; Degood, DE; Wegener, ST; Rowlingson, JC (1984). "Chronic emergency room visitor with chest pain: Successful treatment by stress management and biofeedback". Pain. 18 (315): 319. doi:10.1016/0304-3959(84)90825-X. PMID 6728497.
- Swartzwelder, HS; Wegener, ST; Johnson, CT; Dyer, RS (1980). "Depressed excitability and integrated EEGs following hippocampal afterdischarges". Brain Res. Bull. 5 (5): 509–7. doi:10.1016/0361-9230(80)90254-3. PMID 7427750.
