= SCIT =

SCIT may refer to:

- Subcutaneous immunotherapy (SCIT)
- Symbiosis Centre for Information Technology
- Social cognition and interaction training (SCIT)
