= Cognitive rehabilitation therapy =

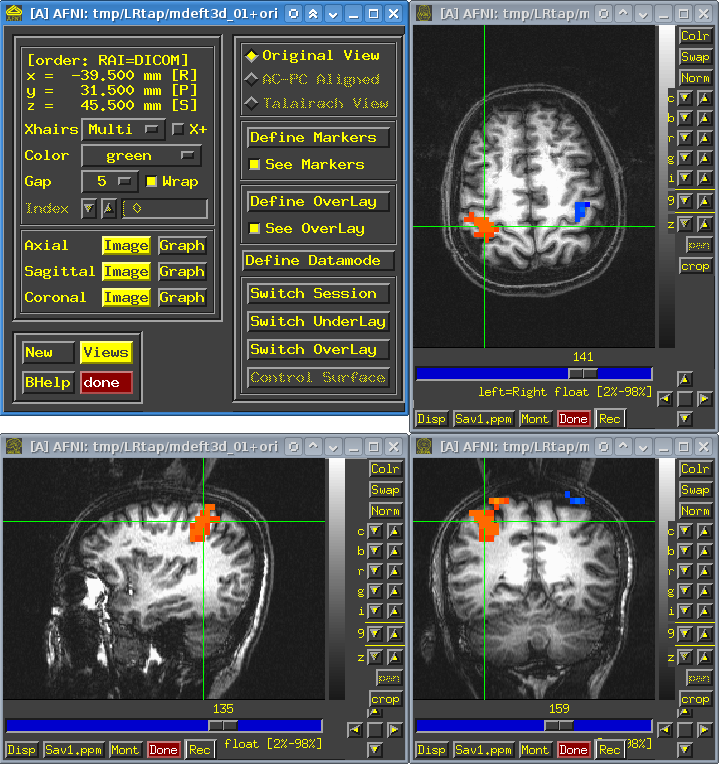
- Effects of cognitive rehabilitation therapy, assessed using fMRI.
- Specialty: Neurology/psychiatry

Cognitive rehabilitation therapy refers to a wide range of evidence-based interventions aiming to restore or compensate for impaired cognitive functioning. Impaired cognitive functioning in patients is typically caused by neurological conditions such as traumatic brain injury, neurodegenerative diseases as well as stroke. The primary goal of cognitive rehabilitation is to improve daily functioning and independence in individuals who have been cognitively impaired, targeting memory, attention, executive function and language/communication to improve an individual's quality of life. The strategies of cognitive rehabilitation therapy are rooted in improving neuroplasticity, and involves an individualized program of specific skills training and practice plus metacognitive strategies. Metacognitive strategies include helping the patient increase self-awareness regarding problem-solving skills by learning how to monitor the effectiveness of these skills and self-correct when necessary.

In cognitive rehabilitation therapy, trained therapists and psychologists create an individualized plan, depending on personal needs and goals, to restore cognitive function as possible. Cognitive rehabilitation therapy aims to improve the core underlying cognitive processes that are lacking due to mental illness or brain injuries, and is different from cognitive behavioral therapy, which focuses on treating mental health disorders.

Cognitive rehabilitation therapy is a subset of Cognitive Rehabilitation (community-based rehabilitation, often in traumatic brain injury; provided by rehabilitation professionals) and has been shown to be effective for individuals who had a stroke in the left or right hemisphere, or brain trauma. Cognitive rehabilitation is done after the patient is medically stable in cases there is injury. Individuals who have impaired cognitive functioning due to childhood lack of support or learning opportunities may also benefit from cognitive rehabilitation therapy.

== Mechanisms and evidence ==
Cognitive rehabilitation builds upon brain injury strategies involving memory, executive functions, activities planning, and "follow through" (e.g., memory, task sequencing, lists). Cognitive and affective thoughts (e.g., beliefs, desires) are subconsciously organized into mental frameworks and inferences, distinguishing CRT from other therapeutic approaches by helping patients be able to recognize distorted thinking patterns, where they can then be examined closer. Neuroplasticity, the brain's ability to form new neural connections, is the basis of cognitive rehabilitation, which calls for repeated targeted practice. Through techniques such as cognitive restructuring, underlying cognitive schemas and automatic thought processes that may hinder normal cognitive function can be modified.

There are currently many evidence-based practices that support cognitive rehabilitation therapy, especially in patients who have suffered from traumatic brain injury (TBI) or stroke. When treatment plans incorporates metacognitive strategy training, individuals are trained with the ability to apply skills learned in a real-world context.

The effects of cognitive rehabilitation therapy remains understudied, although it can be noted that treatment outcomes vary very widely among patients, with a substantial amount of individuals not achieving sufficient improvement. It's theorized that genetic differences play a role and may help future rehabilitation strategies to become more targeted and effective, but the existing evidence is inconclusive. One major limitation of cognitive rehabilitation is that many treatments don't always improve daily functioning even when test performance scores improve. It is theorized that best results are produced when therapy includes tasks from daily life and focused on real-world function.

== Treatment types ==
Typically, cognitive rehabilitation therapy starts with an assessment of current cognitive abilities to identify areas of strengths and the problematic areas needed to improve. Based on testing results, a neuropsychologist will determine what cognitive rehabilitation interventions to focus on in an individual's program plan.

=== Restorative CRT ===
Restorative cognitive rehabilitation, also known as retraining cognitive rehabilitation, repairs lost and damaged cognitive abilities using repetitive, targeted exercises to retrain the brain, using specialized computerized and manual cognitive exercises. This is based on the assumption that the plasticity of the brain can accommodate higher levels of cognitive behavior and skills through regular task practice. Restorative task practice involves exercises targeting various areas of cognition, including learning and memory/attention, problem solving, attention and having complex thoughts. Techniques used in restorative cognitive rehabilitation include simple exercises practicing active recall or expanding vocabulary in manual exercises, but is usually done with commercially available software; The software packages Cogpack, Pss CogRehab, and PositScience are among others in showing greatest success in patients.

==== Cognitive remediation therapy ====
A computer-assisted type of cognitive rehabilitation therapy called cognitive remediation therapy has been used to treat schizophrenia/psychosis, anorexia nervosa, ADHD, and major depressive disorder. Cognitive remediation therapy is a type of restorative rehabilitation.

=== Compensatory CRT ===
Compensatory rehabilitation aims to help the patient develop the skill to use tools and aids to overcome the impairment they're faced with (e.g., patients with impaired memory can compensate by writing down what they need to remember).

== Assessments ==
According to the standard text by Sohlberg and Mateer:

Individuals and families respond differently to different interventions, in different ways, at different times after injury. Premorbid functioning, personality, social support, and environmental demands are but a few of the factors that can profoundly influence outcome. In this variable response to treatment, cognitive rehabilitation is no different from treatment for cancer, diabetes, heart disease, Parkinson's disease, spinal cord injury, psychiatric disorders, or any other injury or disease process for which variable response to different treatments is the norm.

Nevertheless, many different statistical analyses of the benefits of this therapy have been carried out. One study made in 2002 analyzed 47 treatment comparisons and reported "a differential benefit in favor of cognitive rehabilitation in 37 of 47 (78.7%) comparisons, with no comparison demonstrating a benefit in favor of the alternative treatment condition."

An internal study conducted by the Tricare Management Agency in 2009 is cited by the US Department of Defense as its reason for refusing to pay for this therapy for veterans who have had traumatic brain injury. According to Tricare, "There is insufficient, evidence-based research available to conclude that cognitive rehabilitation therapy is beneficial in treating traumatic brain injury." The ECRI Institute, whose report serves as the basis for this decision by the Department of Defense, has summed up their own findings this way:

In our report, we carried out several meta-analyses using data from 18 randomized controlled trials. Based on data from these studies, we were able to conclude the following:

- Adults with moderate to severe traumatic brain injury who receive social skills training perform significantly better on measures of social communication than patients who receive no treatment.
- Adults with traumatic brain injury who receive comprehensive cognitive rehabilitation therapy report significant improvement on measures of quality of life compared to patients who receive a less intense form of therapy.

The strength of the evidence supporting our conclusions was low due to the small number of studies that addressed the outcomes of interest. Further, the evidence was too weak to draw any definitive conclusions about the effectiveness of cognitive rehabilitation therapy for treating deficits related to the following cognitive areas: attention, memory, visuospacial skills, and executive function. The following factors contributed to the weakness of the evidence: differences in the outcomes assessed in the studies, differences in the types of cognitive rehabilitation therapy methods/strategies employed across studies, differences in the control conditions, and/or insufficient number of studies addressing an outcome.

Citing this 2009 assessment, US Department of Defense, one of the federal agencies not responsible for health care decisions in the US, has declared that cognitive rehabilitation therapy is scientifically unproved and should refer their concerns to the US Department of Health and Human Services, US Budget and Management, and/or the Government Accountability Office (GAO). As a result, it refuses to cover the cost of cognitive rehabilitation for brain-injured veterans. Cost-benefit and cost-effectiveness studies, together with an analysis of personnel and veterans' services for new our emerging groups in head and brain injuries, are recommended.

== See also ==
- Rehabilitation (neuropsychology)
- Cognitive remediation therapy
- Rehabilitation psychology
- Community-based rehabilitation
