= WestCare Foundation =

Non-profit organization in Las Vegas, Nevada

WestCare Foundation, Inc.
- Founded: 1973
- Headquarters: Las Vegas, Nevada
- Areas served: United States; US Virgin Islands; Dominican Republic; Puerto Rico; Guam; Republic of Palau
- Key people: Richard "Dick" Steinberg (President); Ken Ortbals (CEO)
- Services: Mental Health & Wellness; Treatment & Rehabilitation; Criminal Justice; Veteran Services; Housing Opportunities; Education & Prevention; Domestic Violence; Emergency Support
- Revenue: 14,641,070 United States dollar (2022)
- Total assets: 14,560,926 United States dollar (2022)
- Website: westcare.com

WestCare Foundation, Inc. is a nonprofit organization offering behavioral health, human services, and support across various locations, including 17 states, Guam, Puerto Rico, the US Virgin Islands, the Republic of Palau, the Dominican Republic, and the Commonwealth of the Northern Mariana Islands.

Their services range from treatment and rehabilitation to mental health support, housing opportunities, education and prevention, Veteran's services, criminal justice support, and assistance for domestic violence victims.

== History ==
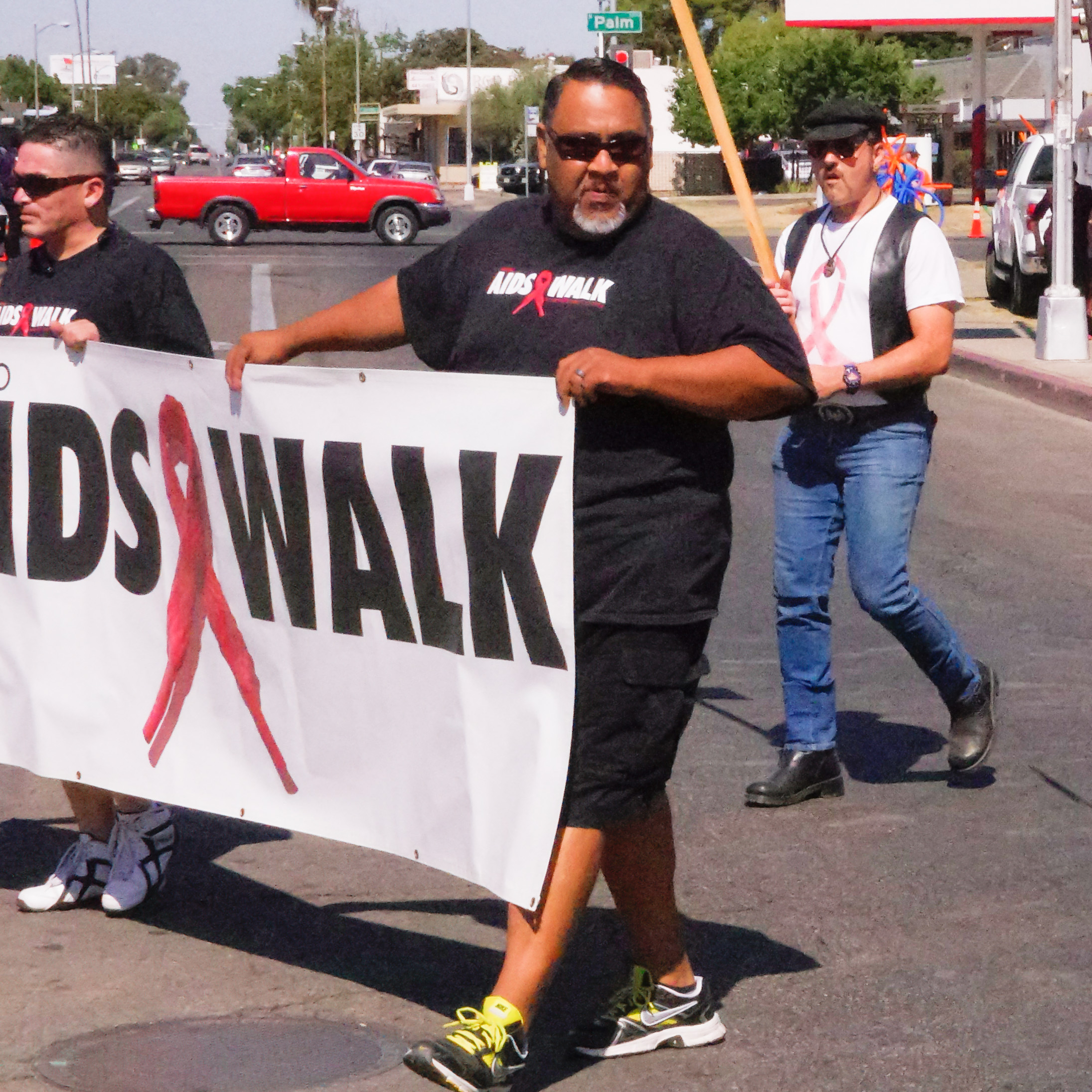
WestCare walk raising awareness for HIV/AIDS in Fresno, California.

WestCare is a non-profit organization founded in 1973. Richard Steinberg is the President of the organization. It offers a diverse range of programs addressing substance abuse, mental health, domestic violence, HIV/AIDS education, homelessness, and support for veterans.

WestCare Arizona manages multiple substance abuse rehab facilities within the state. WestCare California serves as a hub for a wide array of programs, with the opening of the WestCare California (WCCA) Richmond Health and Wellness Center in 2020, marking a significant development in residential treatment and detox facilities for West County.

WestCare Kentucky opened the Judi Patton Center in Elkhorn City in August 2021, offering substance use disorder residential treatment specifically for women in Pike County. WestCare Ohio focuses on education, health, employment readiness, and senior citizen programs tailored for high-poverty neighborhoods.

WestCare Texas, established in 2016, concentrates on wellness, substance abuse recovery, and community assistance. WestCare Pacific Islands (WPI), founded in 2009 and based in Palau since 2015, oversees four programs catering to Veteran families, Guam Healthy Relationships Education, Personal Responsibility Education, and the Guahan Project. Accredited by the Commission on Accreditation of Rehabilitation Facilities (CARF) in 2017, WPI became a contract provider for the United States Department of Veterans Affairs. In 2022 a program was made available for counseling and mental health services to Guam residents in substance abuse recovery.

== Awards and Grants ==
Various financial contributions and grants have been allocated to different WestCare entities over the years. In 2007, WestCare Nevada received $200,000 for facility renovations. Subsequently, MGM Resorts granted $30,000 to the WestCare Foundation's Women and Children's Campus in 2015. In 2019, WestCare Kentucky secured a $1.36 million award to transform a building into a rehabilitation center for women. In July 2022, WestCare Arizona received a $500,000 grant from the Arizona Attorney General's Office. Additionally, the United States Department of Labor issued grants in 2022, with $500,000 allocated to WestCare Pacific Islands, $493,257 to WestCare Kentucky, and $373,439 to WestCare Oregon. The NBA Foundation also contributed $200,000 to WestCare Texas in July 2022 for its summer youth program. Notably, the City of Dayton granted $4.3 million to WestCare Ohio in 2022 to support its community programs and services.
