= Tchanturia =

Tchanturia (Georgian: ჭანტურია) is a Georgian surname. Notable people with the surname include:

- Kate Tchanturia (born 1960), English psychologist
- Romani Tchanturia (born 1996), Georgian football player
