= ACRM =

ACRM may refer to:

- American Congress of Rehabilitation Medicine
- Anti-Corruption Revolutionary Movement, a political movement in Sierra Leone led by John Amadu Bangura
- Aviation Chief Radioman, a rank of the U.S. Navy
- American Computer & Robotics Museum
