= Kathryn V. Marinello =

American businesswoman

- Born: June 2, 1956 (age 69)
- Education: State University of New York at Albany; Hofstra University
- Occupation: Businesswoman
- Title: President and CEO, PODS
- Term: January 2021- present
- Spouse: Paul Marinello

Kathryn V. Marinello (born June 2, 1956) is an American businesswoman, and president and chief executive officer (CEO) of PODS, a moving and storage company.

Previously, she was president and CEO of Hertz Global Holdings.

== Early life ==
Kathryn Marinello was born on June 2, 1956. She studied at Lund University in Sweden, before receiving a bachelor's degree from the State University of New York at Albany in 1978, and a Masters of Business Administration from Hofstra University in Hempstead, New York in 1983.

== Career ==
Marinello's senior positions have varied among companies: ranging from automotive, consumer marketing, banking, business services, technology and executive management. She was named president and CEO of the Electronic Payments Group at First Data Corporation in 1995, which provided electronic banking, commerce, and debit and commercial processing to the financial services industry. Marinello has served in senior financial leadership positions at US Bank, Chemical Bank (now JPMorgan Chase), Citibank and Barclays Bank.

=== General Electric ===
Marinello joined General Electric in 1997 as president of GE Capital Consumer Financial Services and executive vice president of GE Card Services in Cincinnati, Ohio. She managed three of GE's business units, including Consumer Finance (1997-1999), Consumer Insurance, which includes Direct Marketing, Auto & Home Insurance, Auto Warranty and Life Insurance (1999 to 2002), and Fleet Commercial Finance (2002 to 2006). Marinello's role as president and CEO of GE Fleet Services included managing over 3,000 employees in 20 countries.

=== Stream Global Services ===
Upon leaving Ceridian, Marinello was elected chairman and CEO of Stream Global Services in Eagan, Minnesota from August 2010 to 2014, succeeding founder R. Scott Murray, who intended to pursue other business interests.

=== Ares Management LLC ===
After four years in the business outsourcing industry, Marinello gained experience in asset management with Ares Management LLC. She served as a senior advisor and consultant from March 2014 to the fall of 2015.

=== Hertz Global Holdings, Inc. ===
It was announced in December 2016 that Marinello would take over as President and CEO of Hertz Global Holdings, Inc. following John P. Tague's retirement. Her executive role and placement on the rental car company's board of directors officially began on January 3, 2017. (26) Marinello's three-year employment agreement with Hertz includes an annual base salary of $1.45 million. Marinello oversees 9,700 corporate and franchise rental car locations in 150 countries.

Marinello led Hertz Global Holdings, Inc. and various subsidiaries, including:

- The Hertz Corporation in Estero, Florida
- Dollar Thrifty Automotive Group, Inc.: which separates into Thrifty Car Rental and Dollar Rent A Car.
- Donlen Corporation in Bannockburn, Illinois

In May 2020, Marinello resigned and was replaced by Paul Stone as president and CEO of Hertz, with immediate effect.

=== PODS ===
In February 2021, Marinello was named as CEO of PODS.

== Board memberships ==
- MasterCard's U.S. board from 1996 to 2002
- Ceridian Board of Directors from 2006 to 2010
- General Motors Board of Directors - July 2009-January 2017
- Independent member of AB Volvo's Board of Directors since April 2014
- Thrivent Financial Board of Directors in August 2014
- Member of the Supervisory Board at The Nielsen Company from 2014 to 2017
- RealPage, Inc. from 2015 to 2017

== Awards and recognition ==
- 2006 - Named “Industry Leader” by The Minneapolis/St Paul Business Journal at its 9th annual Women in Business awards event.
- 2006 - 20th highest-paid woman in a CEO position (US$8.5 million)
- 2007 - Featured in Fortune Magazine's ranking of America's leading businesswomen
- 2008 - Member of The Business Roundtable
- 2016 - One of Fortune 500's 24 female chief executives
- 2017 - Added to Fortune 500's list of women CEOs - coming in at number 20 in 2017.
- 2018 - Listed in Fortune's list of Most Powerful Women

== Personal life ==
She resides in Bonita Springs, Florida with her husband, Paul.
