= Cognitive remediation therapy =

Treatment designed to improve neurocognitive abilities

Cognitive remediation is designed to improve neurocognitive abilities such as attention, working memory, cognitive flexibility and planning, and executive functioning which leads to improved psychosocial functioning.

== Empirical support ==
Empirical support for cognitive remediation in traumatic brain injury and schizophrenia is documented by published randomized controlled trials and meta-analyses. Effects on cognitive skill performance in schizophrenia are durable for months after the therapies are withdrawn, particularly in terms of executive functioning, working memory, and verbal memory. Importantly, neurocognitive gains have been linked to improvements in obtaining and working in competitive jobs.

== In practice ==
Narrowly defined, cognitive remediation is a set of cognitive drills or compensatory interventions designed to enhance cognitive functioning. However, from the vantage point of the rehabilitation field, cognitive remediation engages the participant in a learning activity to enhance the neurocognitive skills relevant to overall recovery goals. Cognitive remediation programs vary in the extent to which they reflect these narrow or broader perspectives, and there is ongoing research to identify the active ingredients that result in a positive response to treatment. Data suggests that when cognitive remediation is provided to people with schizophrenia, it is most effective when given in the broader context of psychosocial rehabilitation. Recent attention has turned to incorporating motivational enhancements into the treatment of cognitive dysfunction for psychological disorders. Meta-analyses on cognitive remediation usually also consider interventions targeting social cognition and metacognition, such as social cognition and intervention training and metacognitive training. Cognitive remediation can be delivered in 1-to-1 or groups sessions for early psychosis.

=== For anorexia nervosa ===
For individuals with anorexia nervosa, cognitive remediation therapy is an interactive treatment which combines practical exercises with discussions about their relevance to the patient’s everyday life. Cognitive remediation therapy was adapted for anorexia nervosa by Professor Kate Tchanturia and colleagues at the Institute of Psychiatry, Psychology and Neuroscience to address the process rather than the content of thinking, thus helping patients to develop a metacognitive awareness of their own thinking style. The treatment is hypothesized to work by strengthening and refining neural circuits, and by learning and transferring new cognitive strategies to appropriate situations. The aim is to identify and target the cognitive impairments specific to each patient, and to motivate the patient to engage in meta-cognitive processes i.e. to consider their cognitive/thinking styles and to explore alternative strategies, which in turn might lead to behavioral changes. By becoming aware of problematic cognitive styles, the patient can reflect on how these affect everyday life and learn to develop new strategies. The intervention was originally developed for adults with anorexia nervosa but it has been explored for younger patients as well.

== See also ==
- Alice Medalia
- Rehabilitation psychology
