= Rehabilitation psychology =

Specialty area of psychology

Rehabilitation psychology is a specialty area of psychology aimed at maximizing the independence, functional status, health, and social participation of individuals with disabilities and chronic health conditions. Assessment and treatment may include the following areas: psychosocial, cognitive, behavioral, and functional status, self-esteem, coping skills, and quality of life. As the conditions experienced by patients vary widely, rehabilitation psychologists offer individualized treatment approaches. The discipline takes a holistic approach, considering individuals within their broader social context and assessing environmental and demographic factors that may facilitate or impede functioning. This approach, integrating both personal (e.g., deficits, impairments, strengths, assets) and environmental factors, is consistent with the World Health Organization's (WHO) International Classification of Functioning, Disability and Health (ICF).

In addition to clinical practice, rehabilitation psychologists engage in consultation, program development, teaching, training, public policy, and advocacy. Rehabilitation psychology shares some technical competencies with the specialties of clinical neuropsychology, counseling psychology, and health psychology; however, Rehabilitation Psychology is distinctive in its focus on working with individuals with all types of disability and chronic health conditions to maintain/gain and advance in vocation; in the context of interdisciplinary health care teams; and as social change agents to improve societal attitudes toward individuals living with disabilities and chronic health conditions. Rehabilitation psychologists work as advocates with persons with disabilities to eliminate attitudinal, policy, and physical barriers and to emphasize employment, environmental access, social role, and community integration.

Rehabilitation psychologists provide clinical services in varied healthcare settings, including acute care hospitals, inpatient and outpatient rehabilitation centers, assisted living centers, long-term care facilities, specialty clinics, and community agencies. They typically work in interdisciplinary teams, often including a physiatrist, physical therapist, occupational therapist, and speech therapist. A nurse, social worker, prosthetist, chaplain, and case manager also may be included depending on individual needs. Members of the team work together to create a treatment plan, set goals, educate both the patient and their support network, and facilitate discharge planning.

In the United States, the specialty of Rehabilitation Psychology is coordinated by the Rehabilitation Psychology Specialty Council (RPSC), which comprises five professional organizations that represent the major constituencies in Rehabilitation Psychology: Division 22 of the American Psychological Association (APA), the American Board of Rehabilitation Psychology (ABRP), the Foundation for Rehabilitation Psychology (FRP), the Council of Rehabilitation Psychology Postdoctoral Training Programs (CRPPTP), and the Academy of Rehabilitation Psychology (ARP). RPSC represents the specialty to the Council of Specialties in Professional Psychology (CoS). Rehabilitation Psychology is its official journal. Rehabilitation Psychology is certified as one of 14 specialty competencies by the American Board of Professional Psychology (ABPP).

== History ==
The specialty of rehabilitation psychology was established well before psychologists were regularly involved in healthcare settings. In the 1940s and 1950s, psychologists became increasingly involved in caring for persons with disabilities, often the result of combat injuries. Advances in medical care had led to an increased number of people surviving injuries and illnesses that would have been fatal in previous generations. Individuals living with disabilities and chronic health conditions needed help to adjust, and rehabilitation psychology emerged to meet these needs using psychological knowledge to help maximize independence, health, and welfare. In 1954, the Vocational Rehabilitation Act was passed, providing grant funding for research and program development. As a result of this act, many universities opened vocational rehabilitation counseling programs within their graduate schools.

In 1958, Rehabilitation Psychology was established as Division 22 of the American Psychological Association, as an organization of psychologists concerned with the psychological and social consequences of disability, and with the development of ways to prevent and resolve problems associated with disability. By the 1960s, rehabilitation psychology was considered a mature specialty and was prominent throughout the United States. However, it was not until 1997 that the American Board of Professional Psychology approved the establishment of the American Board of Rehabilitation Psychology.

== Key principles and models ==
Theoretical models are important in rehabilitation psychology for understanding and explaining impairments, aiding treatment planning, and facilitating the prediction of outcomes. Models help organize, understand, explain, and predict phenomena. The models used integrate information from a number of disciplines, such as biology, psychology, and sociology. A wide array of models is needed because of the diverse problems and concerns faced by individuals with disabilities and chronic health conditions. Often, more than one model must be applied to properly understand an individual's condition.

Biopsychosocial model: The biopsychosocial model examines the interaction of medical conditions, psychological stressors, the environment, and personal factors to understand an individual's adaptation to disability. This interdisciplinary model is an acknowledgement that disability only can be understood within a larger context, and reflects the longstanding belief of rehabilitation psychologists that cultural attitudes and environmental barriers influence an individual's adaptation and accentuate disability. Notably, the tenets of this model are reflected in the World Health Organization's International Classification of Functioning, Disability and Health (ICF). The framework is holistic and to apply it providers must learn about the disabled person's home life and broader social context.

Psychoanalytic model: In the context of rehabilitation psychology, Freud's concept of castration anxiety can be applied to severe losses, such as the loss of a limb. This concept is reflected in Jerome Siller's stage theory of adjustment, designed to increase understanding of acceptance and adjustment following sudden disability.

Social psychology: The pioneers in rehabilitation psychology were a diverse group, but many came from the field of social psychology. Kurt Lewin is one example. As a Jew living in Germany during the early years of the Nazi regime, Lewin's experiences shaped his psychological work. This is reflected in his conceptualization of the insider-outsider distinction, as well as his understanding of stigma. Lewin is known for his conceptualization B = f(p,e), where behavior (B) is a function of both the person (p) and their environment (e).

Tamara Dembo and Beatrice Wright, two of Lewin's students, are recognized as pioneering figures in the history of rehabilitation psychology. Wright authored two of the field's seminal texts, Physical Disability: A Psychological Approach and the extensively revised second edition, Physical Disability: A Psychosocial Approach. She also proposed the somatopsychological model, which advocates for interpreting disability within its social context. The somatopsychological model is derived from Lewin's field theory and holds that the environment can either aid or hinder an individual's adjustment. Wright's insights and her articulation of the beliefs and principles underlying rehabilitation psychology practice have come to be known as the "foundational principles of rehabilitation psychology" and her work continues to inform contemporary rehabilitation psychology research, theory, and practice.

Cognitive-Behavior Theory: Cognitive behavioral therapy (CBT) approaches such as problem-solving treatment have shown promise in promoting adjustment, well-being, and overall health among individuals with disabilities and chronic health conditions. This model holds that thoughts and coping strategies directly impact feelings and behaviors. By emphasizing, identifying, and changing maladaptive thoughts, CBT works to change an individual's subjective experience and their resulting behavior. A variety of empirical studies have demonstrated CBT's effectiveness in cases of traumatic brain injury, spinal cord injury, and a variety of other conditions common to individuals living with disability and chronic health conditions.

== Clinical specialty areas ==
In clinical settings, rehabilitation psychologists apply psychological expertise and skills to improve outcomes for individuals living with disabilities or chronic health conditions. Common populations treated include individuals with:

- AIDS
- Acquired brain injury
- Cancer
- Chronic pain
- Concussion
- Limb loss
- Multiple sclerosis
- Neuromuscular disorders
- Spinal cord injury
- Stroke
- Traumatic brain injury

When addressing these chronic health conditions and disabilities, rehabilitation psychologists offer a variety of services with the goal of increasing an individual's functioning and quality of life. Specific services may include:

=== Assessment ===
To enhance the rehabilitation process, one must not only identify barriers to recovery, but also personal strengths and resiliency factors that foster continued recovery and social reintegration. Rehabilitation psychology's focus on personal strengths and resiliency has been influential in the field of positive psychology.

Rehabilitation psychologists take into consideration the medical diagnosis, referral question, background history, pre-morbid functioning (independence with basic and instrumental activities of daily living), current functioning (physical, cognitive, psychological), personality characteristics, and goals (career, academic, personal). Depending upon the referral question and individual patient goals, a structured and focused assessment may include any combination of the following components: cognitive function (decisional capacity, mental status, neurocognitive function); physical function (fatigue, health behavior, pain, sleep); psychological function (emotional adjustment, interpersonal/social functioning, personality, mental health conditions). Aspects of the individual's environment also are assessed, including cultural, community, home, rehabilitation, school, vocational, and social environments. In addition to clinical assessment and interview, standardized measures can be helpful for understanding each of these component areas in greater detail. Specifically, rehabilitation psychologist use data from standardized cognitive assessments to assess both cognitive limitations and positive cognitive abilities such as problem-solving skills.

=== Cognitive rehabilitation ===
Cognitive rehabilitation, also known as cognitive remediation therapy, or neuropsychological rehabilitation, refers to the broad range of evidence-based interventions designed to improve cognitive functioning impaired as a result of changes in the brain due to injury or illness. Because of their specialized training in the nuances of impaired cognitive abilities, within the context of personality and emotional factors, rehabilitation psychologists are uniquely qualified to provide interventions for cognitive, behavioral, and psychosocial difficulties following brain injury.

Cognitive rehabilitation interventions have been used with people who have sustained brain injury, stroke, brain tumor, Parkinson's disease, multiple sclerosis, mild cognitive impairment, ADHD, and a variety of other medical conditions that affect cognitive functioning. Cognitive functions targeted may include processing speed, attention, memory, language, visual-perceptual skills, and executive functioning skills such as problem solving and emotional self-regulation. Cognitive rehabilitation can include computer-based tasks, with the caveat that such tasks are most effective when administered under the guidance of a trained clinician in an individualized setting.

Consistent with the foundational principles of rehabilitation psychology, contemporary rehabilitation psychology approaches to cognitive rehabilitation incorporate the subjective experience of the patient while targeting meta-cognition or self regulation. The ultimate goal of all cognitive rehabilitation interventions is to improve the everyday functioning of people in the setting in which they live or work, consistent with their own values and priorities.

== Ethical and legal considerations ==
Rehabilitation psychologists adhere to the same general principles and ethical codes of conduct as all psychologists, under guidelines set forth by the American Psychological Association (http://www.apa.org/ethics/code/). Rehabilitation psychologists also must follow federal laws relevant to individuals with disability. Rehabilitation psychologists often are faced with ethical and legal considerations when assisting patients with concerns such as end-of-life decision making, ability to return to driving (e.g., following acquired brain injury, stroke, or other medical conditions that may impair driving ability), and the role of faith/religion in the individual's health-care decision making.

Relevant federal legislation includes:

- Rehabilitation Act of 1973: This Act prohibits discrimination of persons based on disability status in programs conducted by Federal agencies, those receiving Federal financial assistance, in Federal employment, and in the employment practices of Federal contractors.
- Americans with Disabilities Act (ADA): This Act was an extension of the Rehabilitation Act of 1973. The ADA's five titles prohibit discrimination on the basis of disability in employment, government, public and commercial facilities, transportation, and telecommunications.
- Health Insurance Portability and Accountability Act (HIPAA): This Act was initiated in 1996 in an effort to protect the privacy of patient information. It affects rehabilitation psychologists in a variety of important ways and occasionally contradicts aspects of the APA Ethical Code. For example, under the Act, tests designed to measure psychological and neurocognitive function may not be released to the general public. Instead of releasing the tests themselves, rehabilitation psychologists typically provide summaries of the data, interpretation, and treatment recommendations.

== Education and training ==
In the United States, rehabilitation psychologists complete doctoral degrees (e.g., PhD or PsyD) in fields such as clinical psychology, counseling psychology, neuropsychology, or school psychology, plus pre-doctoral and post-doctoral clinical training in healthcare settings. Rehabilitation psychologists must be licensed in order to provide services in their state of practice and to receive reimbursement from health insurance payers. In most states, obtaining a license requires a doctoral degree from an approved program, a minimum number of hours of supervised clinical experience, and a passing score on the Examination for Professional Practice in Psychology (EPPP), a standardized knowledge-based examination. Most states also require a prescribed number of continuing education credits per year to renew a license.

By the 1960s, the need for standardized guidelines for postdoctoral training in rehabilitation psychology was recognized during the speciality's national conferences. The APA Division of Rehabilitation Psychology (Division 22) and the American Congress of Rehabilitation Medicine spent four years developing guidelines leading up to the 1992 Ann Arbor Conference in Postdoctoral Training in Professional Psychology. Patterson and Hanson outlined the entrance requirements, training length, curriculum requirements, supervision, and evaluations:

- Trainees are accepted only from doctoral programs approved by the American Psychological Association.
- Minimum length of training is one year
- There are a minimum of two supervisors during training
- Curriculum includes supervised practice, seminars, and coursework
- Patient populations and didactics are related to disabilities and chronic health conditions
- There is a minimum of two hours of supervision per week
- All trainees are funded
- There are written objectives for the training program
- Formal trainee evaluations occur at least twice a year
- Program evaluations occur annually

In 1997, the American Board of Professional Psychology approved the establishment of the American Board of Rehabilitation Psychology. Subsequently, the board elaborated on the guidelines from 1995 by requiring a board certification that assesses an individual on the expected competencies. Expected competencies were the capability to assess and treat disability adjustment, cognitive functioning, personality functioning, family functioning, social environment, social functioning, educational functioning, vocational functioning, recreational functioning, sexual functioning, substance abuse, and pain. In addition to displaying these competencies, rehabilitation psychologists are expected to collaborate and consult with other rehabilitation professionals within the interdisciplinary team throughout the treatment process.

The ABRP Board Certification process recognizes, certifies, and promotes competence in the specialty. The American Board of Professional Psychology specifies that in order to meet the standards of the speciality, an individual must complete a recognized internship program, have three years of experience within the field, and have supervised experience within the specialty.

== Notable rehabilitation psychologists ==
- Roger Barker
- Tamara Dembo
- Beatrice Wright
- Stephen T. Wegener

== See also ==
- Neurorehabilitation
- Rehabilitation Psychology (journal)
