= Alice Medalia =

American neuropsychologist

- Education: Tufts University; City University of New York
- Occupation: Clinical neuropsychologist

Alice Medalia is an American clinical neuropsychologist and international leader in the field of psychiatric rehabilitation. She is best known for her work treating cognitive deficits in people with psychiatric disorders. This subspecialty is known as cognitive remediation.

== Education and career ==
Medalia received her BS from Tufts University (1976) and PhD in Clinical Psychology and Neuropsychology from City University of New York (1982). From 1983 to 2006 she served on the faculty of Albert Einstein College of Medicine, rising from Instructor to Professor in the Departments of Psychiatry and Neurology. During this time, she also served as Director of Neuropsychology at Montefiore Medical Center.

In 2007 she moved to Columbia University's College of Physicians and Surgeons, where she is a professor in the Department of Psychiatry. At Columbia, she established the Lieber Recovery and Rehabilitation Clinic, a comprehensive psychiatric rehabilitation program for individuals with persistent mental illness. The Lieber Recovery and Rehabilitation Clinic was featured on the award-winning PBS television series, Healthy Minds.

Medalia has been instrumental in raising awareness about the need to address cognition as a central aspect of health related to functional outcomes. In 1996 she started the largest annual conference on the topic of treating cognition in psychological disorders. This conference, Cognitive Remediation in Psychiatry, takes place in June in New York City.

Alice Medalia is the recipient of the Connie Lieber Research Award the Elizabeth Hurlock Beckman Award for inspirational teaching, and the 2012 Brain Behavior Research Foundation Productive Lives Award.

== Contributions ==
Medalia has primary research interests in treating cognition, motivation, and facilitating recovery among people with mental illness. Her key contribution to psychiatry relates to her application of motivation theories to the treatment of cognitive disorders. Medalia identified the need for the treatment of cognition to move beyond theories of neuroplasticity, to embrace an understanding of how people learn. Drawing on theories of motivation as they related to learning, Medalia showed that intrinsic motivation, which is the motivation to engage in an activity for its inherent value and interest, is significantly linked to the amount of learning that takes place in rehabilitation programs. She also demonstrated that intrinsic motivation is malleable and responsive to environmental cues and instructional techniques.

Medalia developed the widely used NEAR (Neuropsychological & Educational Approach to Remediation) model of cognitive remediation, which has been disseminated worldwide. The NEAR model creates a therapeutic structure designed to enhance intrinsic motivation to learn. It teaches clinicians how to evaluate cognitive training programs, from the vantage of neuropsychology, neuroplasticity theory and motivational theory. This is important because computerized cognitive training activities started to proliferate in the 21st century, and consumers and clinicians needed tools to evaluate the products. The NEAR model has been used with people diagnosed with schizophrenia, depression, bipolar disorder, ADHD, and mild cognitive impairment and implemented in psychiatric, educational, forensic and supportive housing settings. In addition to working with psychiatric populations, Medalia has used cognitive remediation to help formerly homeless individuals in supportive housing improve the cognitive skills needed to work and maintain housing. By focusing on cognitive health in addition to physical and mental health, cognitive remediation seeks to improve such skills as memory, attention, and problem solving, so people are more effective in their daily lives.

== Selected publications ==
- Medalia A, Revheim N. (2002) Dealing with Cognitive Dysfunction Associated with Psychiatric Disabilities OMH Press: Albany
- Medalia A, Revheim N, Herlands T. (2009). Cognitive remediation for psychological disorders, therapist guide. Oxford University Press: New York
- Medalia A, Choi J. (2009) Cognitive Remediation in Schizophrenia. Neuropsychology Review 19(3):353-364 doi:10.1007/s11065-009-9097-y
- Medalia A, Brekke J. (2010) In search of a theoretical structure for understanding motivation in schizophrenia. Schizophrenia Bulletin 36(5):912-918. doi:10.1093/schbul/sbq073
- Choi J, Medalia A. (2010) Intrinsic Motivation and Learning in a Schizophrenia Spectrum Sample. Schizophrenia Research 118(1):12-19.PMID 19716270
- Roder V, Medalia A. (Eds.) (2010) Neurocognition and Social Cognition in Schizophrenia Patients: Basic Concepts and Treatment. Karger Press ISSN 1662-4874. Switzerland
