= Tamara Dembo =

American university teacher and psychologist (1902-1993)

- Born: 28 May 1902; Baku, Azerbaijan, Russian Empire
- Died: 23 October 1993 (aged 91); Worcester, Massachusetts
- Education: University of Berlin (Ph.D)
- Scientific career
- Fields: Psychology
- Workplaces: University of Iowa; Stanford University; Clark University

Tamara Dembo (28 May 1902 – 24 October 1993), was a Russian-born American psychologist. She was one of the pioneers of psychological field theory and rehabilitation psychology.

== Life ==
Tamara Dembo was born in Baku, Azerbaijan, Russian Empire (now the Republic of Azerbaijan) on 28 May 1902 to Russian Jewish parents. She earned her Ph.D at the University of Berlin in 1930, working with Kurt Lewin. That same year she came to the United States to study with Kurt Koffka at Smith College as a research assistant in experimental psychology and decided to remain in the United States because of the rise of the Nazi Party in Germany. She worked at the Worcester State Hospital and was a researcher at Cornell University through 1935 and then worked at the University of Iowa as a research fellow on child welfare through 1943. Dembo was appointed assistant professor at Mount Holyoke College (1943–1945) and subsequently moved to Stanford University to direct research projects on rehabilitation psychology where she worked with Beatrice Wright. She was appointed associate professor at Clark University in 1952 and was promoted to full professor two years later. She retired in 1972, but continued working as an emerita until 1992.

== Activities ==
Dembo's doctoral thesis was translated into English as Field Theory as Human Science in 1976; in it "she laid the foundation of many concepts of field theory... Constructing a laboratory synthesis of anger she described how negative valences develop on the barriers between the participant and a goal, causing the participant to attempt to leave the field. A secondary 'external' barrier was set up that prevented leaving, causing a buildup of tension in the field that eventually broke down the boundaries between reality and fantasy and resulted in an outburst of anger by the participant." In 1941 she co-authored Frustration and Regression: An Experiment with Young Children with Roger Barker and Kurt Lewin and Adjustment to Misfortune with Gloria Ladieu and Beatrice Wright in 1956.

== See also ==
- Rehabilitation psychology
