= Leighton Chan =

Leighton Chan is an American medical researcher and rehabilitation physician. He is the Chief Scientific Officer/Scientific Director at the National Institutes of Health Clinical Center.

== Career ==
Chan received his B.A. degree from Dartmouth College, in Hanover, New Hampshire, with a major in political science. He graduated from the UCLA School of Medicine in 1990. He then completed postgraduate training in Physical Medicine and Rehabilitation at the University of Washington. During his training, he also obtained a Master of Science degree in Rehabilitation Science. Subsequently, he completed a Robert Wood Johnson Clinical Scholar Fellowship, earned a Master of Public Health degree in Health Services at the University of Washington School of Public Health, and was a Congressional Fellow for Jim McDermott (Washington).

From 1994 to 2006, Chan was on the faculty of the Department of Rehabilitation Medicine of the University of Washington (UW). At the UW, he was Medical Director of UWMC's outpatient program, including clinics in Back Pain, EMG and Pulmonary Rehabilitation. He also spent several years as a consultant to a UWMC Sub-Acute Rehabilitation facility. Chan was also deeply involved in training as a member of the UW Residency Training and Admissions Committees, and as the Chair of the Annual UW PM&R Review Course.

He is board certified in Physical Medicine and Rehabilitation. His research interests include health services research, disability assessment, brain injury and pulmonary rehabilitation. His research has received financial support in excess of $45 million. He has published more than 200 peer reviewed articles, including 13 in The New England Journal of Medicine, JAMA, and The Lancet.

In 2013, Chan was named the Co-Editor-in-Chief of the Archives of Physical Medicine and Rehabilitation, the largest and most cited journal in the field.

== Awards ==
Chan’s awards include the Young Academician Award from the Association of Academic Physiatrists, two outstanding teacher awards from the University of Washington School of Medicine, and a Presidential Citation Award for excellence in research by the American Academy of Physical Medicine and Rehabilitation. He has also received four NIH Director’s Awards and three NIH Clinical Center Director's Award for his work in Bethesda. Chan has also won the Distinguished Academician Award from the Association of Academic Physiatrists, the Distinguished Public Service Award from the American Academy of Physical Medicine and Rehabilitation, Rene Jaheil Award for Excellence in Disability Research from AcademyHealth, and the Debbra Flomenhoft Humanitarian Award from Oncology Section of the American Physical Therapy Association. Recently, Chan received the Daniel Webster Award for Distinguished Public Service from the Dartmouth Club of Washington, D.C, and the Health and Human Services (HHS) Award for Excellence in Management. This award is the third highest honor award granted by HHS and is conferred by the Secretary. In 2007, he was one of the youngest individuals elected to the National Academy of Medicine,.

== Selected publications ==
=== Books and book chapters ===
- Chan, L, Koepsell, T, Deyo, RA, Esselman, P, Haselkorn, J, Lowery, JP, Stolov, WC. "The Effect of Medicare’s Payment System on Patient Length of Stay, Charges, and Payments in Rehabilitation Hospitals"". Special Article, New England Journal of Medicine, 1997;337:978-985.
- Rosenblatt, R, Hart, G, Baldwin, LM, Chan, L, Schneeweiss, R. "The Generalist Role of Specialty Physicians: Is there a Hidden System of Primary Care?" JAMA, 1998;279:1364-70.
- Chan, L, Doctor, J, MacLehose, R, Lawson, H, Rosenblatt, R, Baldwin, LM, Jha, A. "Do Medicare Patients with Disabilities Receive Preventive Services? A Population Based Study". Arch of Phys Med Rehabil 1999;80:642-646.
- Gan, SC, Beaver, SK*, Houck, P, MacLehose, R, Lawson, HM, Chan, L. Treatment of Acute Myocardial Infarction and Mortality Among Women and Men. NEJM 2000;343:8-15. *Co-first authors.
- "The National Emphysema Treatment Trial Research Group. Patients at High Risk of Death After Lung Volume Reduction Surgery". NEJM 2001;345:1075-1083.
- Flum, D, Dellinger, EP, Cheadle, A, Chan, L, Koepsell, TE. "Intraoperative Cholangiography and Risk of Common Bile Duct Injury During Cholecystectomy". Lead Article, JAMA 2003;289:1639-1644. (The first author was a research fellow).
- "National Emphysema Treatment Trial Research Group. A Randomized Trial Comparing Lung-Volume-Reduction Surgery with Medical Therapy for Severe Emphysema". NEJM 2003;348-2059-73.
- Flum, DR, Cheadle, A, Prela, C, Dellinger, EP, Chan, L. "Bile Duct Injury During Cholecystectomy and Survival in Medicare Beneficiaries" JAMA. 2003;290:2168-2173.
- Chan, L, Hart, LG, Ricketts, TC, Beaver, SK. "An Analysis of Medicare's Incentive Payment Program for Physicians in Health Professional Shortage Areas". J of Rural Health 2004;20:109-117.
- Flum, DR, Dellinger, EP, Broeckel, J, Cheadle, A, Chan, L. "Early Mortality Among Medicare Beneficiaries Undergoing Bariatric Surgical Procedures". Lead Article, JAMA 2005;294:1903-190

== See also ==
- Wing-tsit Chan, Leighton Chan's grandfather
