= Donlen =

- Type: Public
- Industry: Fleet leasing Fleet management
- Founded: 1965; 61 years ago
- Founder: Donald Rappeport; Leonard Vine
- Headquarters: Bannockburn, Illinois, U.S.
- Services: Lease Financing, Vehicle Acquisition, Vehicle License & Titling, Vehicle Remarketing, Truck Upfitting, Driver Compliance
- Number of employees: 300
- Parent: Athene Holding
- Website: www.wheels.com

Donlen LLC was an American fleet leasing and management company headquartered in Bannockburn, Illinois, a suburb of Chicago. The company provided consultation, maintenance, and outsourcing services for corporate vehicle fleets. In 2021, Donlen was acquired by Athene Holding Ltd. In 2023, Donlen LLC, Wheels Inc. and LeasePlan USA merged under the name Wheels. The consolidated organization became one of the largest fleet management companies in North America, managing over 900,000 vehicles and serving clients in 58 countries through its Ayvens alliance.

== History ==
Donlen Corporation was founded in 1965 by Donald Rappeport and Leonard Vine. In September 2011 the company was acquired by Hertz Global Holdings, Inc for $250 million in cash and the assumption of $770 million in Donlen fleet debt and operated as a subsidiary of the Hertz Corporation. On March 30, 2021, Hertz completed a sale of the business to Athene Holding.

In December 2022, Donlen, Wheels, and LeasePlan USA combined under Athene to create one of the largest fleet management businesses in North America. On February 28, 2023, the combined entity officially began operating as Wheels. As part of this rebranding, the Donlen website now redirects to wheels.com, reflecting the integrated operations and unified brand.

== Business overview ==
Donlen, now operating under the Wheels brand, specializes in managing and consulting on commercial vehicle fleets, including cars, vans, and trucks. Core services include lease financing, vehicle acquisition, vehicle registration, vehicle remarketing, truck upfitting, and driver compliance. Wheels continues to provide these services across a combined fleet of over 800,000 vehicles.

== Wheels overview ==
Wheels (now encompassing Wheels, Donlen and LeasePlan USA) is one of the largest fleet management companies in North America. Headquartered in Des Plaines, Illinois, Wheels manages comprehensive fleet services, including vehicle acquisition, leasing, telematics, maintenance, and driver support.

=== Partnerships ===
Donlen had a history of environmental partnerships, including a strategic alliance with the EDF to help commercial and municipal vehicle fleets monitor and reduce carbon emissions. In addition, Donlen partnered with the EPA's SmartWay Program to display Smartway Vehicle Certifications on qualifying vehicles to help drivers and fleet managers choose environmentally responsible options.

These partnerships continue under the Wheels brand.
