= Kate Tchanturia =

English psychologist and eating disorders researcher

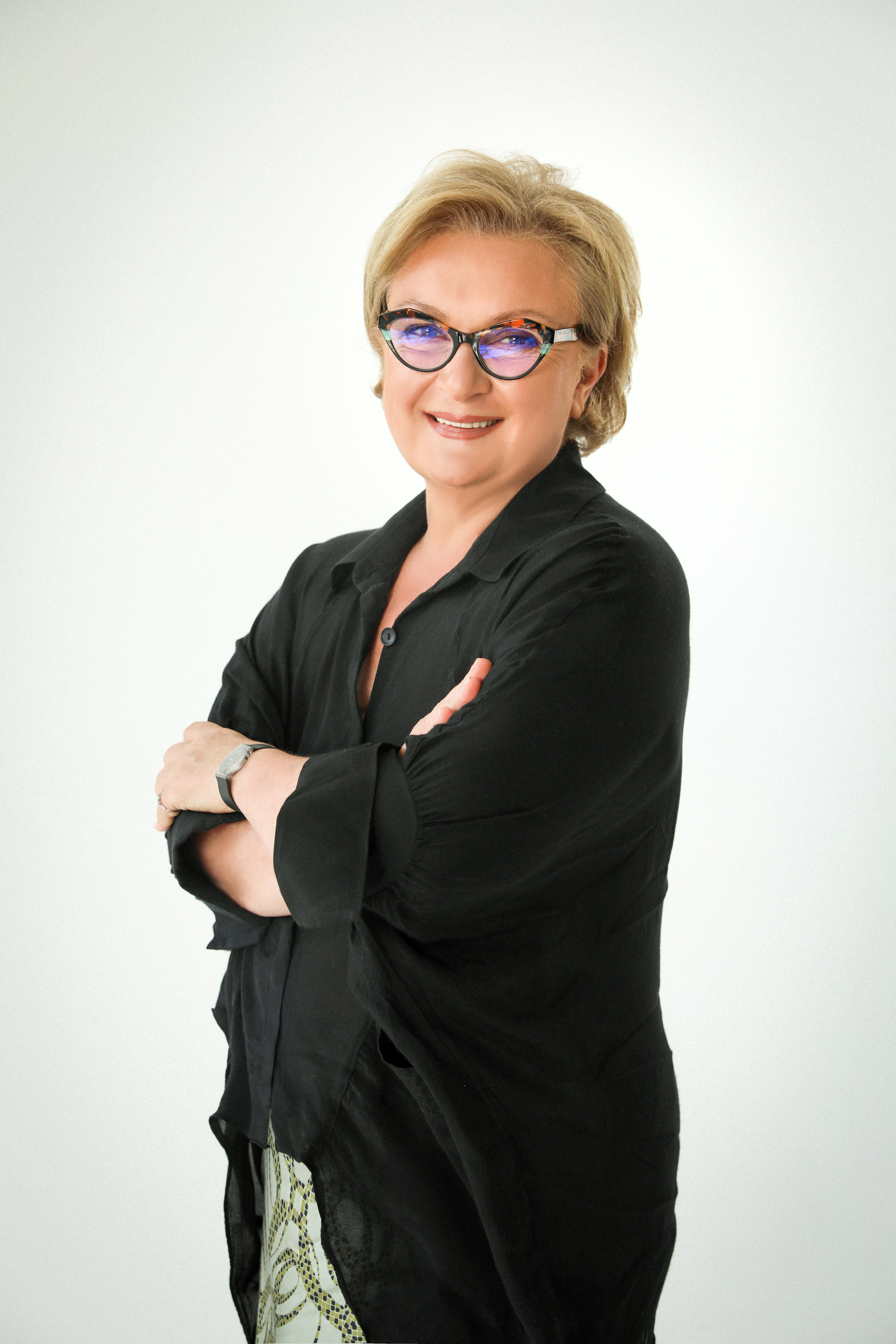
Tchanturia in 2025

Kate Tchanturia is a Georgian-British psychologist who is a professor of psychology in eating disorders at the Institute of Psychiatry, Psychology and Neuroscience, King's College London. She is also Consultant Psychologist at the South London and Maudsley NHS Foundation Trust for the National Eating Disorder Service, and president of the Eating Disorders Research Society. Her main research interests include cultural differences in illness presentations, cognitive profiles in eating disorders, and experimental work in emotion processing and translational research from experimental findings to real clinical practice. Tchanturia has a particular interest in women's mental health and has pioneered the PEACE pathway for autism and eating disorder comorbidity.

== Education ==
Tchanturia began her academic career at Tbilisi State University, Georgia in 1977, gaining her BSc in General and Experimental Psychology in 1982 and her doctorate in Experimental Psychology (PhD) in 1988. She relocated to London, United Kingdom in 1997 and was accredited as a chartered clinical psychologist (2001) and later awarded fellowship of the British Psychological Society in 2014.

== Career and research ==
=== Academic career ===
Tchanturia became an associate professor at Tbilisi State University in 1995. After relocating to London in 1997, she became a clinical research fellow at the Institute of Psychiatry, King's College London in 1998. She was later appointed a Lecturer in Mental Health Studies and Eating Disorders at the Institute of Psychiatry, Psychology and Neuroscience in 2004. Tchanturia's research primarily concerns the cognitive and socio-emotional aspects of eating disorders, implementing positive psychology in clinical practice. She has adapted a cognitive training programme for eating disorders, called Cognitive Remediation Therapy, which seeks to address inflexible and overly detail-focused cognitive styles in patients with eating disorders. Her latest research investigates the nature of autistic traits in patients with eating disorders. She has developed a novel clinical pathway for patients with comorbid autism and eating disorders at the South London and Maudsley NHS Foundation Trust National Eating Disorders Service.

=== Clinical career ===
Tchanturia worked as a clinical psychologist at Tbilisi City Psychiatric Hospital from 1982 to 1994. She was then appointed to the role of Consultant Clinical Psychologist for the Outpatient Department of the Institute of Psychiatry in Tbilisi.

After relocating to the United Kingdom, Tchanturia worked as a Clinical Research Fellow at Institute of Psychiatry, Psychology and Neuroscience, King's College London from 1998 to 2003. She subsequently continued her work as a locum psychologist and later Consultant (lead) Clinical Psychologist in 2004 for the South London and Maudsley NHS Foundation Trust from and is currently employed in this role. Tchanturia developed group therapy protocols for the inpatient treatment programme for eating disorders as well as two evidence-based individual psychological interventions: cognitive remediation therapy (CRT) and Cognitive Remediation and Emotion Skills Training (CREST). Most of the clinical manuals have been adapted for younger age groups and translated in different languages.

=== Pathway for Eating Disorders and Autism ===
Tchanturia's research paved the way for the extensive research at the South London and Maudsley NHS Foundation Trust eating disorders service. Research from her lab identified an overlap between autism and eating disorders and found that approximately 35% of women with anorexia nervosa have comorbid autism. It was proposed that the presence of both disorders could affect recovery from eating disorders, and could predict a more chronic course of illness. Moreover, females are at elevated risk of their autism going undiagnosed as their difficulties are frequently mislabelled or missed entirely. Therefore, women in eating disorder services who have comorbid autism often go undiagnosed and fail to receive appropriate treatment. Professor Tchanturia and colleagues have developed and implemented a novel clinical pathway tailored to the needs of autistic patients with eating disorders: The PEACE Pathway (Pathway for Eating disorders and Autism developed from Clinical Experience). This clinical pathway was funded by The Health Foundation and further supported by The Maudsley Charity. The novel pathway was developed using the Institute for Healthcare's Model of Improvement methodology, using an iterative Plan, Do, Study, Act (PDSA) format to introduce change and to co-produce the work with people with lived experience, carers and clinicians.

Based on findings from their qualitative studies that mapped out the needs for the three stakeholders, Tchanturia and colleagues collaboratively engaged people with lived experience, carers, and clinicians from the National Eating Disorder Service to develop the PEACE clinical pathway.

As the Principal Investigator of the PEACE Pathway, Tchanturia has been disseminating her findings through several means, including a book, peer-reviewed publications, social media platforms, conferences around the world, interviews with the media and a website. The website includes a range of free resources and blog posts.

== Publications ==
Tchanturia has edited several textbooks relating to eating disorders treatment, including: Brief Group Psychotherapy for Eating Disorders (2015) and Cognitive Remediation Therapy (CRT) for Eating and Weight Disorders (2015). In 2021, her book titled Supporting Autistic People with Eating Disorders: A Guide to Adapting Treatment and Supporting Recovery was published by Jessica Kingsley Publishers. Tchanturia has addressed the link between autism and anorexia nervosa in a BBC interview.

Tchanturia is the author of over 300 peer-reviewed journal articles. Her H index in 2025 is 71. In 2019, Tchanturia was recognised as one of the world leaders in the domain of research on eating disorders treatment, ranking 5th on Expertscape among world experts in anorexia nervosa.

== Honours and awards ==
- 2020: Distinguished Contribution Award, British Psychological Society, Clinical Practice board
- 2020: Research Leadership Award, Academy of Eating Disorders
- 2021: Elected member of Academia Europaea (Academy of Europe)
- 2021: Highly commended HSJ value awards
- 2024: National Award of Georgia for outstanding contribution to science
- 2025: Member of the Order of the British Empire (MBE)
