= Children's Health Fund =

Nonprofit organization in the U.S.

- Founded: 1987
- Founder: Irwin Redlener; Paul Simon
- Type: National organization
- Location: 215 West 125th Street, 3rd Floor, New York, NY 10027
- Key people: Irwin Redlener; Paul Simon; Karen Redlener
- Website: www.childrenshealthfund.org

Children's Health Fund (CHF) is a nonprofit organization that provides health care to children and families on mobile medical clinics throughout the United States. CHF was founded in 1987 by singer/songwriter Paul Simon and pediatrician/advocate Irwin Redlener. The organization began with a single mobile medical unit funded by Simon and designed by Redlener's wife, Karen. More than 20 years later, the organization has 23 programs with more than 50 mobile medical units and is the nation's leading provider of mobile-based health care for homeless and low-income children and their families. Karen Redlener remains with CHF, currently serving as the organization's executive director.

CHF programs are committed to the full range of children's health care from health education and preventative care to the diagnosis and management of acute and chronic diseases. CHF programs provide or coordinate care that fosters oral and mental health, as well as specialty or hospital care.

== Paul Simon ==
In 1985, Irwin Redlener joined the board of USA for Africa as the organization's medical director and director of grants, where he met Paul Simon. In 1987, Redlener and Simon founded Children's Health Fund to provide health care to homeless and medically underserved children in New York City.

Throughout the years, Simon has held charity concerts and benefit events supporting CHF and has traveled to Washington, D.C., to speak to elected officials on behalf of CHF.

== National network ==
CHF's National Network serve children and families in Arkansas; Austin, Texas; Baton Rouge, Louisiana; Chicago, Illinois; Dallas, Texas; Detroit, Michigan; Harlem, New York; Idaho; Los Angeles, California; Memphis, Tennessee; Mississippi; Mississippi Gulf Coast; New Orleans; New York City; New Jersey; Orlando, Florida; Phoenix, Arizona; San Francisco, California; South Florida; Southern Arizona; Washington, D.C.; and West Virginia.

CHF has two affiliate programs in Philadelphia, Pennsylvania, and Montrose, Colorado.

== Advocacy ==
CHF supported the creation of the Children's Health Insurance Program in 1997 as well as the passage of the Patient Protection and Affordable Care Act (PPACA) in 2010.

== Crisis response ==
CHF works with the National Center for Disaster Preparedness at Columbia University to help document and assess the impact of major disasters on children and the communities they live in.

Since Hurricane Andrew, Children's Health Fund has activated a crisis response plan to help provide medical assistance to the victims of the disaster. CHF initiated this plan again after the terror attacks of 9/11 providing support at ground zero in New York City; after Hurricane Katrina ravaged the Gulf Coast in 2005; and most recently after the BP Oil Spill.
