= American College of Rheumatology =

Organization of health professionals and scientists

The American College of Rheumatology (ACR; until 1985 called American Rheumatism Association) is an organization of and for physicians, health professionals, and scientists that advances rheumatology through programs of education, research, advocacy and practice support relating to the care of people with arthritis and rheumatic and musculoskeletal diseases.

It organizes scientific meetings, publishes three medical journals (Arthritis & Rheumatology, Arthritis Care & Research, and ACR Open Rheumatology), and promotes (through the Research and Education Foundation) research into rheumatological conditions, including the formulation of diagnostic criteria for diseases. Its division, the Association of Rheumatology Health Professionals, represents non-physician health care professionals in the field.

== Master of the American College of Rheumatology (MACR) ==
The Master of the American College of Rheumatology is a recognition given to ACR members aged 65 or older who have made notable contributions to rheumatology through scholarly work or service. The nominee may provide additional information about their achievements. Masters are exempt from annual fees and can attend ACR annual meetings for free.

== See also ==
- ACR score for rheumatoid arthritis
