= PODS (company) =

American moving and storage company

- Type: Private
- Industry: Moving and storage
- Founded: 1998; 28 years ago
- Headquarters: Clearwater, Florida, U.S.
- Area served: United States, Canada, Australia, United Kingdom
- Key people: Kathryn V. Marinello (president and CEO)
- Owner: Ontario Teachers' Pension Plan
- Website: pods.com

PODS (from Portable On Demand Storage), is an American moving and storage company. Founded in 1998, it is based in Clearwater, Florida.

PODS is owned by the Ontario Teachers' Pension Plan.

== History ==
PODS was founded in 1998 by Peter Warhurst who was looking to expand his family's storage business. He invented PODS containers, as well as a hydraulic lift system that enables operators to easily deliver and transport the units, which he named PODZILLA.

In 2003, PODS received an equity investment of $15M from the Hunt Private Equity Group, along with a $25M senior credit facility from Congress Financial Corp.

In 2005, PODS grossed over $200 million in revenue, and was still privately owned. By then, the company was franchised in 45 states, and logged 2,500 pickups and deliveries a day.

Between 2005 and August 2009, PODS service expanded to include 48 states, as well as Australia and Canada.

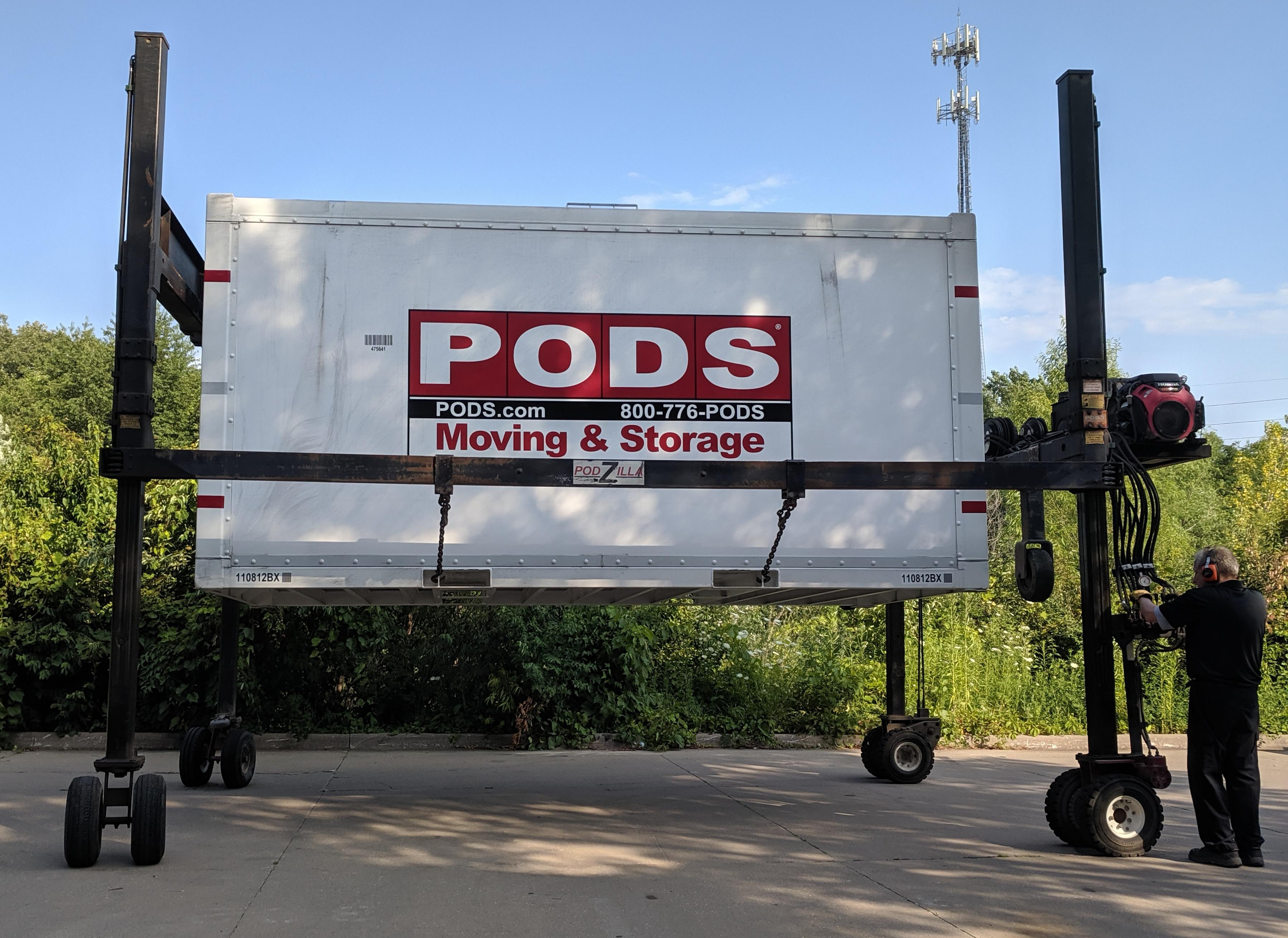
A POD being lifted for placement on the back of a flatbed truck

In February 2007, PODS was acquired by Bahrain-based investment firm Arcapita for $451.4 million.

In August 2009, PODS and moving services holding company UniGroup reached an agreement to share services. Under the agreement, PODS would have access to the packing and loading services of UniGroup's United Van Lines and Mayflower Transit businesses, while UniGroup could access 138,000 PODS moving and storage containers.

In June 2010, PODS announced the sale of the first franchise in the United Kingdom.

In 2012, PODS sued fellow transportation carrier U-Haul International in U.S. District Court for trademark infringement, claiming that U-Haul "improperly and unlawfully" used the word "pods" to describe its U-Box product. On September 25, 2014, a jury ruled that U-Haul had infringed on PODS' trademarks, causing confusion and damaging business for PODS. The jury found that U-Haul unjustly profited from mentioning the term on its marketing and advertising materials and started using the word only after PODS became famous as a brand name in the moving and storage industry. The jury awarded PODS $62 million in damages.

As of 2014, PODS provided residential and commercial moving services in 46 states as well as Australia, Canada and the United Kingdom.

In February 2015, Arcapita finalized the sale of PODS for more than $1B to the Ontario Teachers' Pension Plan.

In 2018, PODS opened a West Coast sales and service center in Reno, Nevada to help keep pace with their continued growth.

In August 2020, PODS was featured on an episode of Military Makeover, hosted by Montel Williams, when they provided storage containers and services to support a home makeover honoring a Marine Corps veteran.

PODS has been a national sponsor of the Marine Corps Toys for Tots Foundation since 2010. During the yearly toy drives, PODS containers are used to store donated toys at Toys for Tots collection points across the U.S. and PODS then provides transportation of the donated toys to local Toys for Tots distribution centers.

== Business model ==
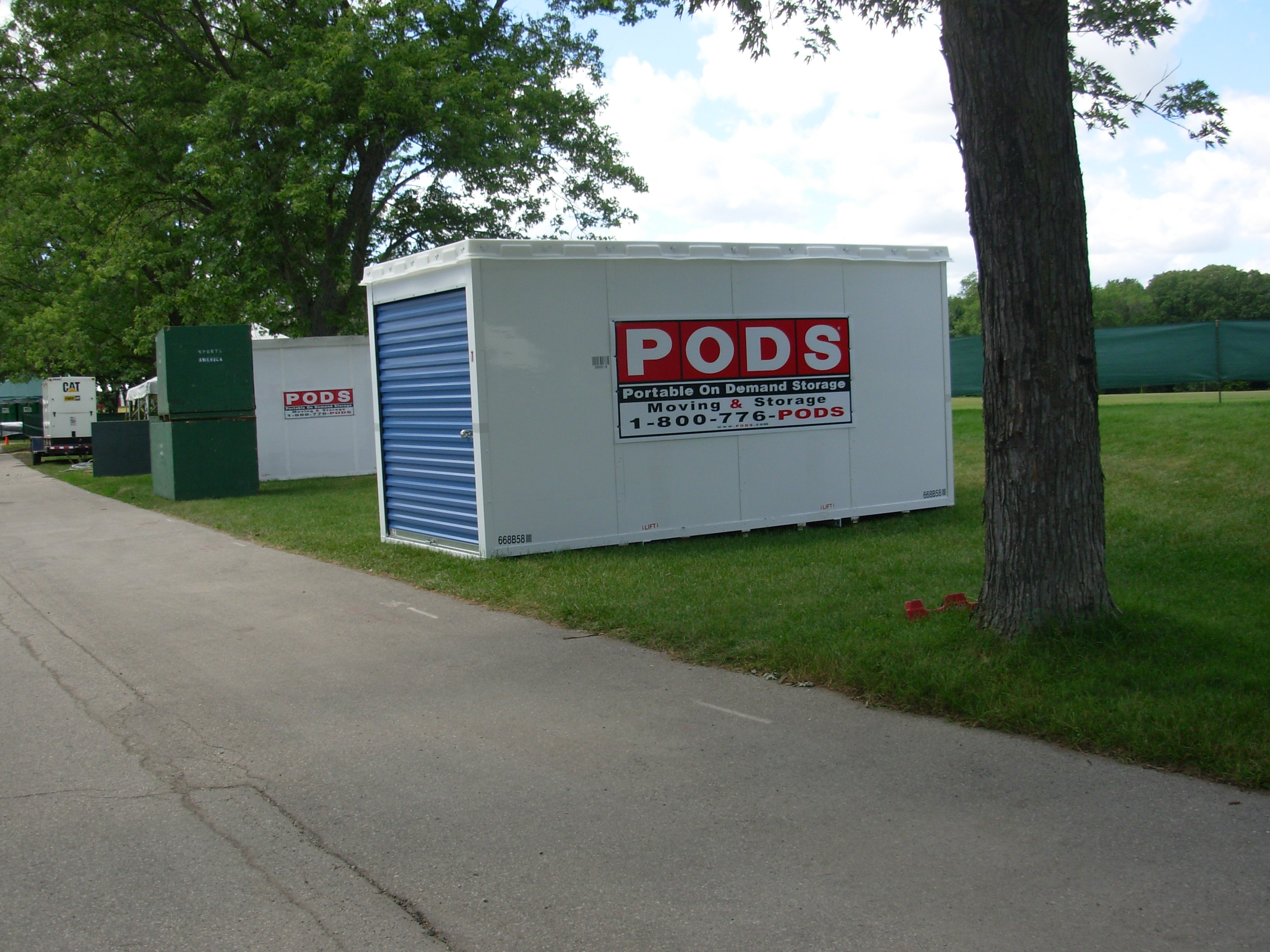
PODS container at a sporting event

To conduct business, PODS sends a storage container to the client's location, which the client then packs themselves. The units can then be stored at a warehouse or delivered to another location. PODS containers are available in three sizes and are steel-framed, weather-resistant, and they come equipped with tie-down hooks and steel-locking latches. The units and warehouse are owned by local franchisees. As of 2007, PODS was working with telecommunications carrier Sprint Nextel to use wireless GPS to track trucks in the fleet and to give directions for deliveries.
