= Archives of Physical Medicine and Rehabilitation =

- Discipline: Physical medicine and rehabilitation
- Language: English
- Edited by: Leighton Chan and Allen W. Heinemann

Publication details
- History: 1918–present
- Publisher: Elsevier
- Frequency: Monthly
- Impact factor: 3.6 (2023)

Standard abbreviations
- ISO 4: Arch. Phys. Med. Rehabil.

Indexing
- CODEN: APMHAI
- ISSN: 0003-9993 (print); 1532-821X (web)
- LCCN: 21016464
- OCLC no.: 01513891

Links
- Journal homepage

The Archives of Physical Medicine and Rehabilitation is the official journal of the American Congress of Rehabilitation Medicine (ACRM). The journal is published monthly by Elsevier and is the most highly cited journal in the Rehabilitation category of the Thomson Reuters Journal Citation Reports. The 2023 Impact Factor was 3.6.

In addition to the original research, reviews, and commentary submitted to the journal, The Archives publishes the abstracts to the ACRM Annual Conference each year. The ACRM is an organization of rehabilitation professionals dedicated to serving people with disabling conditions by supporting research that promotes health, independence, productivity, and quality of life; and meets the needs of rehabilitation clinicians and people with disabilities. ACRM's current President is Pamela Roberts. ACRM's CEO is Jon Lindberg.

The journal is edited by Leighton Chan and Allen W. Heinemann. The Deputy Editor is Helen Hoenig.

== Awards ==
Sidney Licht was a longtime member of the American Congress of Rehabilitation Medicine and was its president in 1967–68. He was the editor of the Physical Medicine Library, which was published by his wife, Elizabeth. The Licht award originated in March 1979 with its first award presented to Carl Granger, Gary Albrecht, and Byron Hamilton for their article "Outcomes of Comprehensive Medical Rehabilitation: Measurement by PULSES Profile and the Barthel Index". The award is given every year for the best scientific article published in Archives of Physical Medicine and Rehabilitation during the previous year.

== History ==
- 1918: The Journal of Roentgenology is launched.
- 1920: The Journal of Radiology is launched, superseding Journal of Roentgenology.
- 1926: The journal changed its name from the Journal of Radiology to the Archives of Physical Therapy, X-ray, Radium, and was declared the official journal of the American Congress of Physical Therapy.
- 1930: Albert F. Tyler, MD, presented the Archives to the American Congress of Physical Therapy as a debt-free, unencumbered gift.
- 1938: The journal name was shortened to Archives of Physical Therapy given the decreased emphasis on X-ray and radium among physicians using physical modalities.
- 1939: The Society of Physical Therapy Physicians was formed, the forerunner of the American Academy of Physical Medicine and Rehabilitation (AAPM&R). The Archives was designated as its official journal.
- 1945: The name of the journal became the Archives of Physical Medicine. The term "physical medicine" represented a change of emphasis from the purely clinical to the scientific and diagnostic basis of the medical use of physical agents. It also served to clarify the distinction between physicians and technicians of physical therapy, a stance the American Medical Association had recently adopted.
- 1952: Increasing recognition of the relationship between physical medicine and the rapidly growing field of rehabilitation resulted in a name change from the American Congress of Physical Therapy, to the American Congress of Physical Medicine and Rehabilitation.
- 1953: The official name of the journal changed to its present name, Archives of Physical Medicine and Rehabilitation.
- 1966: The official name of the Congress was changed once again, to the American Congress of Rehabilitation Medicine (ACRM).
- 1973: ACRM and AAPM&R executed an agreement whereby both organizations shared responsibility for the journal. This formalized a long period whereby AAPM&R designated Archives its official journal.
- 1986: AAPM&R and the ACRM entered into formal shared ownership of the Archives.
- 2009: AAPM&R relinquishes co-ownership of the Archives. The ACRM is the sole owner again.
- 2010: The Archives surpasses 1,000 submissions per year.
- 2012: The Archives surpasses 1,500 submissions per year.
- 2013: The Archives undergoes a redesign, taking its new design from the redesigned ACRM logo. The overlapping petals of the lotus flower visually communicate the interdisciplinary nature of Archives and the culture of ACRM. The seeds of the lotus, much like Archives and ACRM, remain viable for many, many years. The lotus is also a symbol of rebirth, rising from dark and muddy waters; the ACRM community and the research published in Archives aim to bring about new beginnings for people affected by disabling conditions. Leighton Chan, MD, MPH, FACRM and Allen Heinemann, Ph.D., ABPP (FACRM) begin their term as co-Editors-in-Chief of the Archives.
- 2014: The Archives introduces the mandatory use of Reporting Guidelines from the Equator Network.
- 2017: Marks the debut of RehabCast, the official podcast of the Archives of Physical Medicine and Rehabilitation. Hosted by Ford Vox, MD, RehabCast is the PM&R podcast for all of rehabilitation medicine: physiatry, occupational therapy, physical therapy, speech-language pathology, neuropsychology, rehabilitation nursing, and more.
- 2018: The Archives welcomed the Archives of Rehabilitation Research and Clinical Translation (ARRCT), ACRM's open-access journal serving the rehabilitation research community. The founding Editor-in-Chief is Jeffrey R. Basford, MD, Ph.D., past Editor-in-Chief of the Archives. ARRCT is the open-access companion journal to the Archives and is published online by Elsevier.
- 2020: The Archives of Physical Medicine and Rehabilitation, ACRM's flagship journal, celebrates its 100th year of continual publication.
- 2024: ARRCT Archives of Rehabilitation Research and Clinical Translation received an Impact Factor of 1.9. ARRCT is ACRM's open-access journal serving the rehabilitation research community.

== Abstracting and indexing ==
The contents of Archives of Physical Medicine and Rehabilitation are indexed in Index Medicus/MEDLINE, Excerpta Medica/EMBASE, Current Contents/Clinical Medicine, Science Citation Index, Citation alert, BIOSIS Previews, and CINAHL.

== See also ==
- Physical medicine and rehabilitation
