= The Clinical Journal of Pain =

- Discipline: Pain management
- Language: English
- Edited by: Dennis C. Turk

Publication details
- History: 1985-present
- Publisher: Lippincott Williams & Wilkins
- Frequency: Monthly
- Impact factor: 2.893 (2019)

Standard abbreviations
- ISO 4: Clin. J. Pain

Indexing
- ISSN: 0749-8047 (print); 1536-5409 (web)
- LCCN: 98641014
- OCLC no.: 806420168

Links
- Journal homepage; Online access; Online archive

The Clinical Journal of Pain is a monthly peer-reviewed medical journal published by Lippincott Williams & Wilkins. It was established in 1985 and covers research on all aspects of pain management. According to the Journal Citation Reports, the journal has a 2018 impact factor of 2.893, ranking it 13th out of 29 journals in the category "Anesthesiology" and 82nd out of 191 journals in the category "Clinical Neurology".
