= American Congress of Rehabilitation Medicine =

The American Congress of Rehabilitation Medicine (ACRM) (originally the American College of Radiology and Physiotherapy) is an organization of rehabilitation professionals dedicated to serving people with disabling conditions by supporting research that promotes health, independence, productivity, and quality of life; and meets the needs of rehabilitation clinicians and people with disabilities.

In order to enhance current and future research and knowledge translation, ACRM assists researchers in improving their investigations and dissemination of findings, educates providers to use evidence generated by research and deliver best practices, and advocates for funding of rehabilitation research.

The ACRM is a global community of both researchers and consumers of research in the field of rehabilitation. ACRM is the only United States-based professional association representing all members of the interdisciplinary medical rehabilitation team, including: physicians, psychologists, rehabilitation nurses, occupational therapists, physical therapists, chiropractors, speech-language pathologists, recreation specialists, case managers, rehabilitation counselors, vocational counselors, and disability management specialists.

== Organization ==
The ACRM is led by elected members organized into the Board of Governors. Supporting the Board of Governors are volunteer standing committees as well as a business team led by the Chief Executive Officer.

| Executive Committee | 2019-2020 |
|---|---|
| President | Pamela Roberts, PhD, OTR/L, SCFES, FAOTA, CPHQ, FNAP, FACRM |
| President Elect | Stephanie Kolakowsky-Hayner, PhD, CBIST, FACRM |
| Treasurer | Michael Jones, PhD, FACRM |
| Secretary | Fofi Constantinidou, PhD, CCC-SLP, CBIS, FACRM, FASHA |
| Past President | Deborah Backus, PT, PhD, FACRM |
| Member-at-Large | Risa Nakase-Richardson, PhD, FACRM |
| Member-at-Large | Jeanne M. Zanca, PhD, MPT, FACRM |
| Member-at-Large | Virginia Mills, MS, PT, CCM, Licensed NHA, FACRM |
| Member-at-Large International | Christina Papadimitriou, PhD |
| Member-at-Large | Deirdre R. Dawson, PhD, OT Reg. (Ont.) |
| Member-at-Large | Dawn Neumann, PhD, FACRM |
| Member-at-Large Early Career Co-Chair, Program Committee | Brad Kurowski, MD, MS, FACRM |
| Archives Editor-in-Chief | Jeffrey R. Basford, MD, PhD, FACRM |
| Archives Co-Editor-in-Chief | Leighton Chan, MD, MPH, FACRM |
| Archives Co-Editor-in-Chief | Allen W. Heinemann, PhD, ABPP (RP), FACRM |
| Brain Injury ISIG* Chair | Kristen Dams-O’Connor, PhD, FACRM |
| Spinal Cord Injury ISIG* Chair | Ceren Yarar-Fisher, PT, PhD |
| Stroke ISIG* Chair | Mark Kovic, OTD, OTR/L, FAOTA |
| CEO | Jon Lindberg, MBA, CAE, Yale-GELP |

*Interdisciplinary Special Interest Group

== Membership ==
ACRM accepts members from any field related to rehabilitation, including clinicians, researchers, administrators, consultants, consumers, educators, research funders, insurers, and policymakers. Students and new entrants to the field are encouraged to join; a “young investigators” course offered each year as part of the annual meeting. The course helps them become rehabilitation researchers, and well-connected ACRM members.

Members meet colleagues from around the world, engage with experts and mentors, learn new research strategies, access the latest clinical guidelines, advance academic and research careers, and gain opportunities to shape and lead the field of rehabilitation. Members represent various disciplines, including:

- Audiology
- Biomedical Engineering
- Biostatistics
- Case Management
- Clinical Epidemiology
- Clinical Research
- Counseling, Pastoral
- Counseling, Rehabilitation
- Counseling, Vocational
- Dietetics | Nutrition
- Health Services Research
- Neurology | Neurosurgery
- Neuropsychology
- Occupational Therapy
- Pediatrics
- Psychology
- Physiatrist
- Physical Therapy
- Psychiatry
- Recreational Therapy
- Rehabilitation Medicine
- Rehabilitation Nursing
- Rehabilitation Psychology
- Social Work
- Speech | Language Pathology

== Awards ==
The ACRM annually honors individuals who make significant contributions to the field of rehabilitation and research in this area. These six prestigious awards are presented at the Henry B. Betts Awards Gala during the annual conference.

=== Coulter Lecturer Award ===
This distinguished lectureship honors John Stanley Coulter, MD, a past president and treasurer of the ACRM, and former editor-in-chief of the Archives of Physical Medicine and Rehabilitation. Award winners are recognized for achievements that significantly advance the field of rehabilitation.

=== Distinguished Member Award ===
Established in 1988, this award honors ACRM members who have significantly contributed to the development of ACRM, demonstrating leadership skills, organizational abilities, and public service.

=== Gold Key Award ===
This award was established in 1932 as a certificate of merit for members of the medical and allied health professions who have rendered extraordinary service to the cause of rehabilitation. It is the highest honor given by ACRM.

=== Licht Award ===
The Elizabeth and Sidney Licht award, named for a husband-wife duo that published key textbooks in rehabilitation medicine, recognizes excellence in scientific writing in rehabilitation. The award is given for the best scientific article published in the Archives of Physical Medicine and Rehabilitation in the previous year.

=== Lowman Award ===
This award was established in 1989 in honor of Edward Lowman, MD, who recognized the importance of multidisciplinary teams in rehabilitation. ACRM members whose careers reflect an energetic promotion of the spirit of interdisciplinary rehabilitation are eligible for this award.

=== Wilkerson Early Career Award ===
ACRM established the Deborah L. Wilkerson Memorial Fund in honor of this beloved member, past president, and ACRM Fellow. Deborah was devoted to improving the quality of rehabilitation and independent living services and was an advocate for individuals with disabilities. The Deborah L. Wilkerson Early Career Award is given each year during the ACRM annual conference to the most promising member early in his/her rehabilitation research career.
