= Arthritis & Rheumatology =

- Discipline: Rheumatology
- Language: English
- Edited by: Daniel H. Solomon

Publication details
- Former names: Arthritis & Rheumatism; Arthritis Care and Research
- History: 1958–present
- Publisher: John Wiley & Sons
- Frequency: Monthly
- Open access: Hybrid
- Impact factor: 10.995 (2020)

Standard abbreviations
- ISO 4: Arthritis Rheumatol.

Indexing
- CODEN: ARRHBO
- ISSN: 2326-5191 (print); 2326-5205 (web)
- LCCN: 2013200527
- OCLC no.: 826899584

Links
- Journal homepage; Online access; Online archive

Arthritis & Rheumatology is a monthly peer-reviewed medical journal covering the natural history, pathophysiology, treatment, and outcome of the rheumatic diseases. It is an official journal of the American College of Rheumatology.

It was established in 1958 as Arthritis & Rheumatism and obtained its current name in 2014.

In 2000, it absorbed the journal Arthritis Care and Research (ISSN 0893-7524, with the ISO 4 abbreviation Arthritis Care. Res.), the official journal of the American Arthritis Health Professions Association, established in 1980. In 2010, the journal split into a new Arthritis Care and Research (ISSN 2151-464X, with the ISO 4 abbreviation Arthritis Care. Res. (Hoboken)), the official journal of the American College of Rheumatology.

According to the Journal Citation Reports, the journal has a 2020 impact factor of 10.995.
