= Robert M. Johnson (publisher) =

American journalist

Robert M. Johnson (born July 14, 1945 in Joliet, Illinois) is the former publisher of the newspaper Newsday.

Johnson attended Lockport Central High School. He graduated from Louisiana State University in Baton Rouge, in 1968, majoring in Business Finance and Management. He received a Juris Doctor degree in 1971 from the University of Michigan Law School in Ann Arbor, Michigan.

Johnson was admitted to the Bar in Illinois and Washington, D.C. and joined the firm Seyfarth, Shaw, Fairweather and Geraldson, specializing in representation of the media. He became a partner in 1976 and left the firm to become vice-president and general manager of the Dispatch Printing Company of Columbus, Ohio in 1978. He was recruited to join Newsday as president and chief operating officer in 1982 and was promoted to Publisher and chief executive officer in 1986, a position he held until he resigned in November 1994. During his nine years as Newsday's Publisher, the paper expanded into New York City, grew from the ninth to the fifth largest newspaper in the U.S., became the largest selling paper in the New York metropolitan area, and won seven Pulitzer Prizes.

After moving to Long Island in 1982, Johnson served as a director of the New York State Business Council, the Long Island Association, and currently serves as a director of the New York City Partnership. He also has served as a director of the Long Island Philharmonic, the New York Blood Center, the Brooklyn Academy of Music, the South Street Seaport Museum, the Advertising Council, the Audit Bureau of Circulations, and Hofstra University.

Johnson later served as the chairman and CEO of Bowne & Co., Inc., an international leader in supporting the information and document management needs of the financial services industry, headquartered in Manhattan.

He has also received an Honorary Doctor of Laws degree from St. John's University, an Honorary Doctor of Humane Letters degree from Hofstra University, and an Honorary Doctor of Science degree from Dowling College.

On August 4, 2006, he pleaded guilty in the United States District Court for the Southern District of New York to one count of possession of child pornography and one count of destroying computer records, and was sentenced to fifteen months in federal prison on December 15, 2006. In 2004, citing personal reasons, he resigned as CEO of the financial information and document management firm Bowne & Co, as well as from his position as a member of the New York State Board of Regents.
