= Irwin Redlener =

American public health activist and author

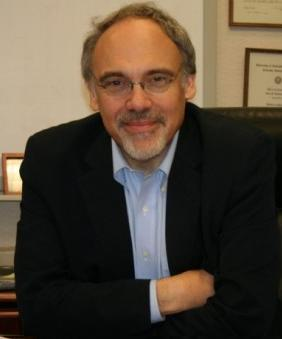
- Born: New York City, New York, U.S.
- Education: Hofstra University (BS); University of Miami (MD)

Irwin Redlener is an American pediatrician and public health activist who specializes in health care for underserved children and disaster planning, response, and recovery. He is the author of The Future of Us: What the Dreams of Children Mean for 21st Century America (2017/2020) and the author of Americans at Risk: Why We Are Not Prepared for Megadisasters and What We Can Do Now (2006).

Redlener is an Adjunct Senior Research Scholar at Columbia University’s School for International and Public Affairs, as well as the Founding Director of the National Center for Disaster Preparedness at Columbia University.

Redlener is co-founder (along with Karen Redlener) of the Ukraine Children's Action Project, which was founded in May 2022 in response to the displacement of children and families consequent to the Russian invasion of Ukraine. UCAP focuses on supporting the educational continuity and mental health of displaced children in Ukraine and Poland.

He is also a Clinical Professor of Pediatrics at Albert Einstein College of Medicine as well as president emeritus and co-founder (with singer-songwriter Paul Simon and Karen Redlener) of Children's Health Fund (CHF).

== Background ==
Redlener was born in Brooklyn, New York. He received his B.A. from Hofstra University in 1964 and his M.D. from the University of Miami in 1969. In 1971, while a pediatric resident at University of Colorado Medical Center, Redlener left his program to serve as the medical director of an AmeriCorps VISTA health center in Lee County, Arkansas, the sixth poorest county in the U.S. During this time, he met his future wife, Karen, a VISTA volunteer who organized the region's first social services and child development program. The two have worked together since.

== Career ==
Redlener served as the director of the pediatric intensive care unit at Jackson Memorial Hospital, Miami, Florida. He also worked on disaster relief efforts in Honduras and Guatemala, and created a new Child Action Center in Miami to study and treat child abuse. In 1979, after a brief stint in neonatal intensive care at Albert Einstein College of Medicine, he briefly worked as a community pediatrician in Utica, New York. He also served as chairman of the national executive committee of Physicians for Social Responsibility, a public health organization promoting the prevention of nuclear war.

In 1985, Redlener joined the board of USA for Africa as the organization's medical director and director of grants, where he met Paul Simon. In 1987, Redlener, Paul Simon, and Karen Redlener founded the Children's Health Fund to provide health care to homeless and medically underserved children in New York City. The program began with a single mobile medical unit funded by Simon and designed by Karen Redlener. As of 2023, the organization had 25 programs with more than 50 mobile medical units in underserved rural and urban communities throughout the United States. Karen Redlener remains with the Fund, currently serving on CHF’s Board of Directors.

Redlener also served as head of outpatient pediatrics at Cornell/New York Hospital (1987–1990) and head of community pediatrics at Montefiore Medical Center (1990–2003). Redlener designed and oversaw the development of the Children's Hospital at Montefiore and served as its president from 2001 to 2003.

During the 1992 presidential campaign, Redlener was chairman of the National Health Leadership Council, a group of 300 health professionals who supported Bill Clinton's candidacy. In 1993 and 1994, he was part of the White House Task Force on National Health Care Reform, serving as the vice-chairman of its Health Professional Review Group. He was also a founding member of the Task Force on Terrorism of the American Academy of Pediatrics in 2001.

In April 2000, Redlener was engaged by Doris Meissner, Commissioner of the Immigration and Naturalization Service (INS), to provide strategic guidance regarding the management of the Elián González case. He claimed in a letter to INS that based on weeks of studying the case including a "propaganda 40-second video of 7-year-old Elian," he “is now in a state of imminent danger to his physical and emotional well-being in a home that I consider to be psychologically abusive.” He urged that the government immediately remove the "horrendously exploited” Elian from the “bizarre and destructive ambiance” of his Miami relatives and returned to his biological father. Eleven Cuban-American doctors dismissed Redlener's opinion for not “having obtained a medical history, performed a physical examination or other proper psychological evaluations of Elian." Redlener strongly refuted the premise of these assertions and suggested that his critics had no understanding of how to diagnose psychological child abuse. Republican National Committee Chairman Jim Nicholson said Redlener was "neither a psychiatrist nor a psychologist and who has never examined the young Cuban refugee."

In 2003, Redlener was recruited to the Mailman School of Public Health at Columbia University to establish the National Center for Disaster Preparedness (NCDP). Since 2003, Redlener has served as the founding director of NCDP, working to improve public policy and resources, as well as citizens’ individual preparedness. In 2013, the NCDP moved from the Mailman School to join Columbia University's Climate School before joining the affiliated faculty of the Institute of Global Policy chaired by Secretary Hillary Clinton and SIPA dean Keren Yarhi-Milo.

In May 2009, Redlener was appointed to the National Commission on Children and Disasters. In 2010, in part due to his research on the health effects of the Deepwater Horizon oil spill, the National Commission on the BP Deepwater Horizon Oil Spill and Offshore Drilling appointed Redlener to serve as the Commission's Special Consultant on Public Health.

On November 15, 2012, following Hurricane Sandy, New York Governor Andrew Cuomo appointed Redlener co-chair of the NYS Ready Commission, which was tasked with finding ways to ensure critical systems and services are prepared for future natural disasters and other emergencies.

On June 17, 2014, New York City Mayor Bill de Blasio named Redlener special advisor with a focus on emergency management and planning to support and advise the administration's citywide disaster preparedness and response efforts.

Later, in 2017, Redlener worked with singer Marc Anthony to create Somos Una Voz to support the recovery of Puerto Rico following the devastation brought by Hurricane Maria.

In 2020, Redlener and the singer Cher co-founded Cher Cares, a charity supporting disadvantaged communities affected by the COVID-19 pandemic. From 2022 -2022, Redlener was head of Columbia University's Pandemic Resource and Response Initiative.

== See also ==
- List of TED speakers
