= Rehabilitation Psychology (journal) =

- Discipline: Psychology
- Language: English
- Edited by: Anna Kratz and Paul B. Perrin

Publication details
- History: 1972-present
- Publisher: American Psychological Association (United States)
- Frequency: Quarterly
- Impact factor: 1.7 (2024)

Standard abbreviations
- ISO 4: Rehabil. Psychol.

Indexing
- ISSN: 0090-5550 (print); 1939-1544 (web)

Links
- Journal homepage; Online access

Rehabilitation Psychology is a quarterly peer-reviewed academic journal and the official journal of Division 22 of the American Psychological Association. The journal was established in 1972 and covers research on the "broader fields of psychology and rehabilitation." The current editors-in-chief are Anna Kratz and Paul B. Perrin.

The journal has implemented the Transparency and Openness Promotion (TOP) Guidelines. The TOP Guidelines provide structure to research planning and reporting and aim to make research more transparent, accessible, and reproducible.

== Abstracting and indexing ==
The journal is abstracted and indexed by MEDLINE/PubMed and the Social Sciences Citation Index. According to the Journal Citation Reports, the journal has a 2024 impact factor of 1.7.

== See also ==
- Rehabilitation psychology
