= Beatrice Wright (psychologist) =

American psychologist

Beatrice Ann Wright
- Born: Beatrice Ann Posner; December 16, 1917; Richmond, New York
- Died: July 31, 2018 (aged 100)
- Education: Brooklyn College; University of Iowa
- Occupation: Psychologist
- Spouse: Erik Wright

Beatrice Ann Wright (born Beatrice Ann Posner December 16, 1917 – July 31, 2018) was an American psychologist known for her work in Rehabilitation psychology. She was the author of a seminal work on disability and psychology, Physical Disability—A Psychological Approach (1960) and its second edition, retitled Physical Disability—A Psychosocial Approach (1983).

== Personal life ==
Wright was born Beatrice Ann Posner along with her twin brother Sidney in Richmond, New York, on December 16, 1917. Her parents, Jerome and Sonia Posner, were Russian immigrants whose egalitarian and humanistic views later influenced her academic work. The family had a Jewish heritage that Wright said did not profoundly affect her worldview or formative years, but which probably influenced her parents' avid commitment of equality and justice. From her parents' perspective there were two ways to resolve an injustice: "One way is to justify the situation. The other way is to do something about the injustice". In high school Wright was expelled from the honors society for distributing leaflets in support of the janitors' strike, but was reinstated at her mother's demand. She died in July 2018 at the age of 100.

Wright met her husband, Erik, while studying at the University of Iowa. They have three children. She turned 100 in December 2017.

== Professional life ==
After graduating from high school at 16, Wright attended Brooklyn College, where she studied psychology. There, she studied with psychologists such as Solomon Asch and Abraham Maslow, even participating in their experiments. She graduated in 1938 and continued her education at the University of Iowa, earning a Master's and a PhD. At the University of Iowa she studied with Kurt Lewin.

After earning her PhD, Wright taught at Swarthmore College. During World War II her husband was drafted, leading to the family's relocation to California. Wright left her teaching position to be with him and began working at the United States Employment Service. She was tasked with administering the Stanford Binet Intelligence Scales and then finding employment for people with intellectual disabilities. There she had her first direct exposure to people with disabilities, which launched her lifetime interest in and advocacy for them. She worked at the United States Employment Service until 1946 when she left to raise her three children.

While a stay-at-home mother, Wright was contacted by Roger Barker, another former student of Lewin, to collaborate on a book about physical disability; she agreed. She said that her review of the literature was what fueled her passion for developing appropriate and culturally responsive ways of working with people with disabilities, as the methodology at the time was biased against them. The work with Barker also led to her husband's gaining a teaching position at the University of Kansas, and while he worked at the university she began to work with children who were deaf and their families, which furthered her personal and academic interest in people with disabilities. The work with Barker, Adjustment to Physical Handicap and Illness: A Survey of the Social Psychology of Physique and Disability, was a landmark publication in both the field of psychology and Wright's career. She proceeded to collaborate with many other now notable rehabilitation psychologists, such as Tamara Dembo and Gloria Ladieu Leviton, on topics related to disability. She also worked with Fritz Heider on his book The Psychology of Interpersonal Relations.

The Wrights moved to Australia in 1959 when Erik, received a fellowship from the Fulbright Program. Wright used her time there to complete her seminal work on disability and psychology, Physical Disability—A Psychological Approach, which was published in 1960. This work is considered the introduction of disability as a social issue in the field of psychology and it remains influential, having been canonized by the APA as an outstanding 20th-century publication in psychology. Lewin's influence is prominent in the work, as Wright drew heavily from his view of social psychology that all differences in physical appearance provoked attention from observers. In 1983 she republished an extensively revised version of the book retitled Physical Disability—A Psychosocial Approach to reflect the importance of the interactions with the environment. The APA has also canonized the revision as an outstanding publication.

Wright's awards for her work include the Distinguished Alumna Award from the University of Iowa, the Irvin Youngberg Award for Achievement in Applied Science in 1984, and the Kurt Lewin Award from the Society for the Psychological Study of Social Issues.

== Physical Disability—A Psychosocial Approach ==
Physical Disability—A Psychosocial Approach is wide in scope, as it addresses many components of acceptance of physical disability on personal and societal levels. Wright contrasts coping and succumbing as the two frameworks in which disability is addressed. She also presents a stage model of psychosocial adjustment to disability, by presenting four major changes: enlargement of scope, subordination of the physique, containment of disability effects, and transformation from comparative to asset values. Enlargement of scope includes recognizing values separate from the disability: a person begins to acknowledge areas of skill not affected by their disability. This is typically the first change to occur. In the second change, the subordination of the physique, a person begins to limit the importance of physical appearance as a source of identity; they often increase the emphasis on personality or personal traits not connected to their disability. The third component is containment of disability effects: the person sees the disability as affecting only the parts of them it actually affects instead of generalizing limitations to other areas. Finally, there is a transformation from comparative to asset values in which the person stops comparing themself to others and focuses more on their own values.

== See also ==
- Rehabilitation psychology
