= Social cognition and interaction training =

Method in cognitive behavioral therapy

Social cognition and interaction training (SCIT) is a cognitive behavioral therapy to improve social cognition with the aim of improving downstream social functioning with people suffering of schizophrenia.

In schizophrenia, the ability to adaptively infer the thoughts and feelings of others (i.e., social cognition) is strongly associated with community functioning.
