= List of cathedrals in Bangladesh =

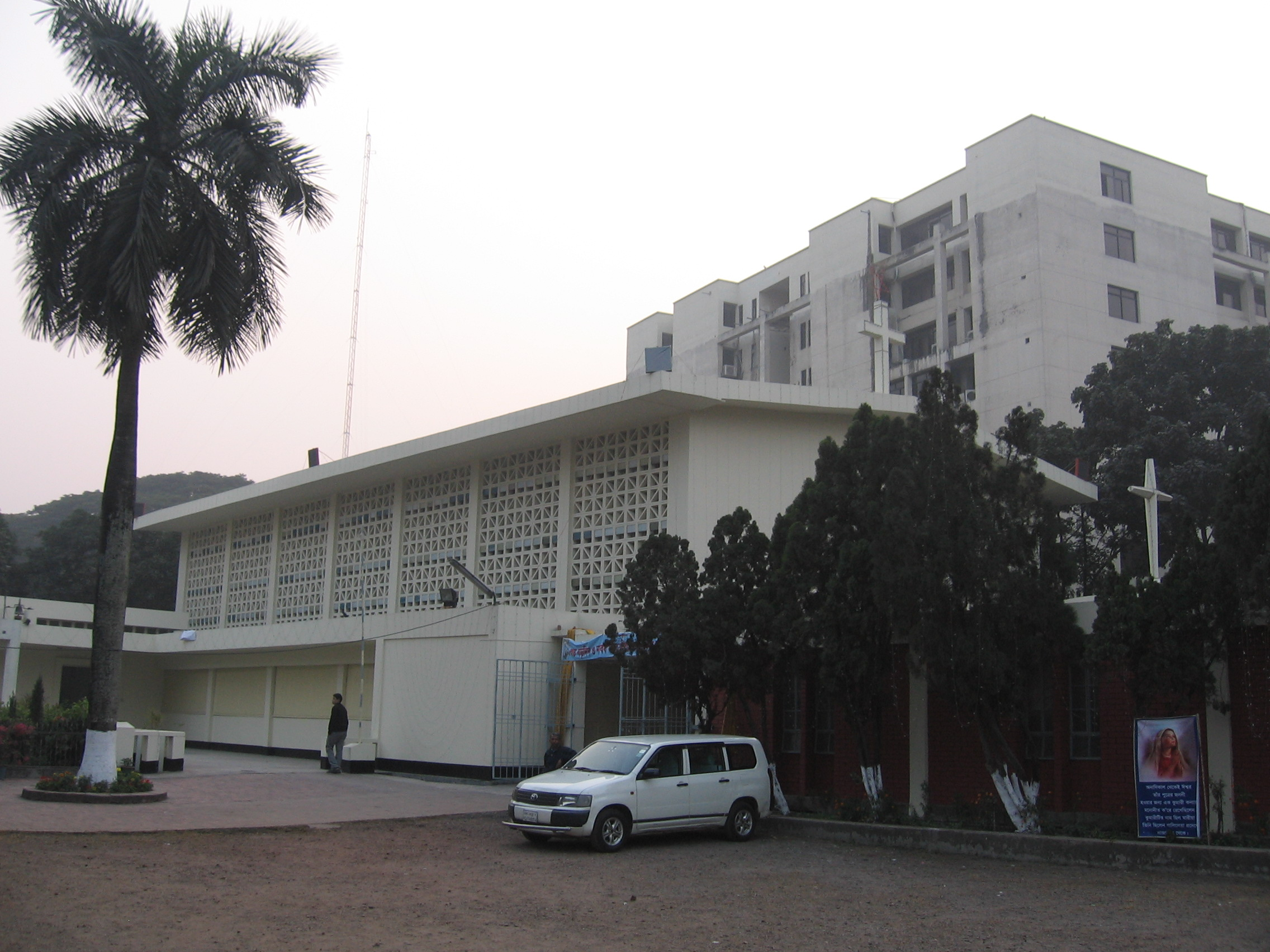
St Mary's Cathedral, Dhaka

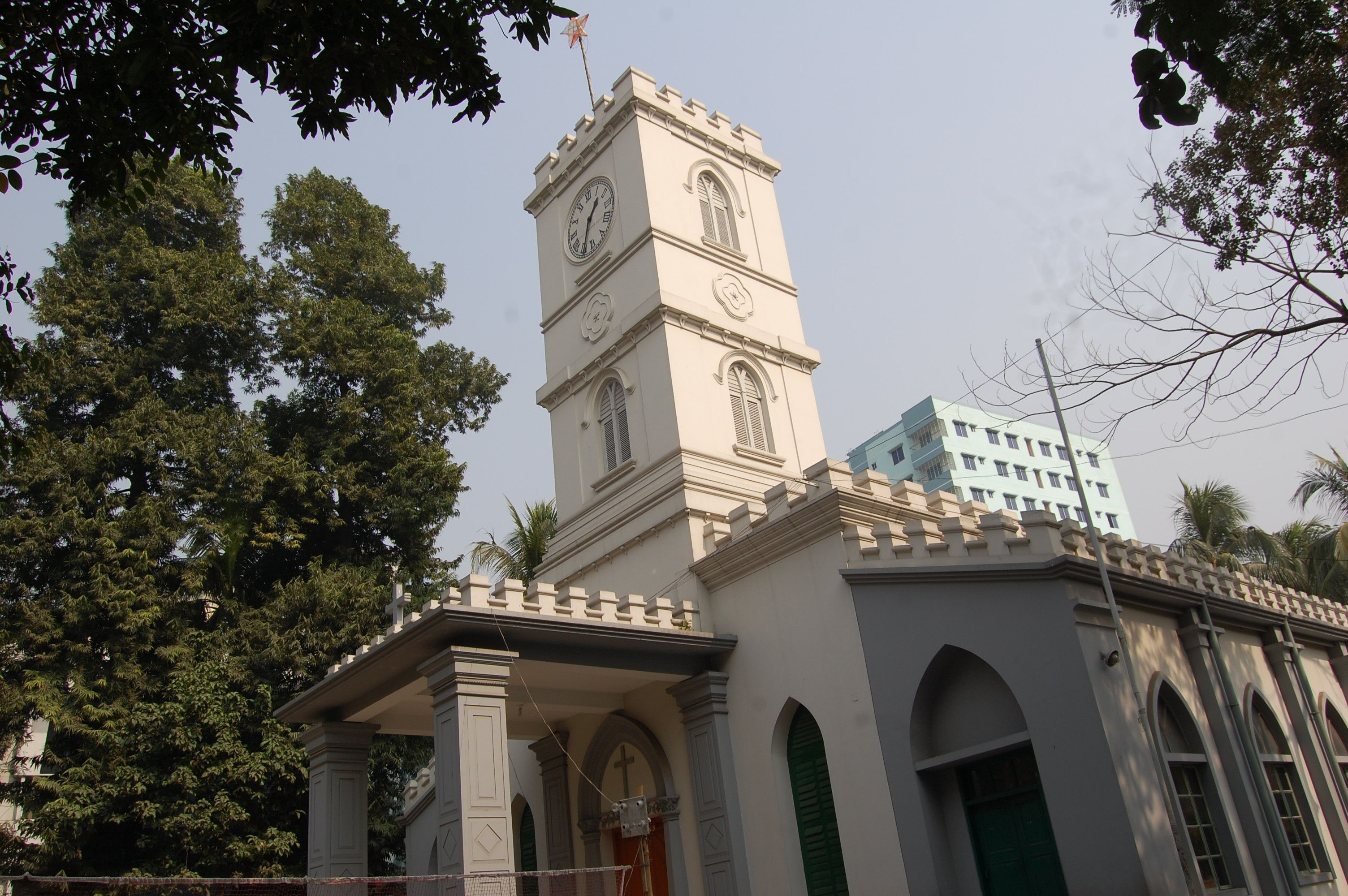
St Thomas Cathedral Church, Dhaka

This is the list of cathedrals in Bangladesh sorted by denomination.

== Catholic ==
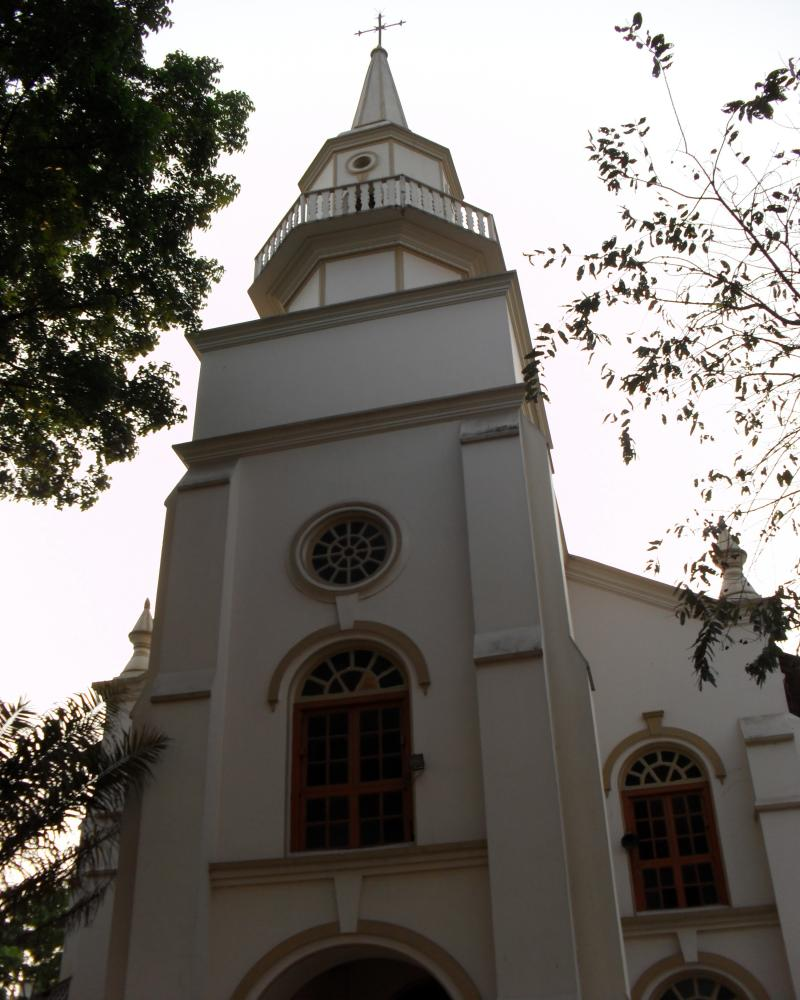
Our Lady of the Holy Rosary Cathedral, Chittagong

Cathedrals of the Catholic Church in Bangladesh:

- St Peter's Cathedral in Barisal
- Our Lady of the Holy Rosary Cathedral, Chittagong
- St. Mary's Cathedral in Dhaka
- St. Francis Xavier Cathedral in Dinajpur
- St. Joseph's Cathedral in Khulna
- St. Patrick's Cathedral in Mymensingh
- Cathedral of Christ the Redeemer in Rajshahi
- Church of the Divine Mercy in Moulvibazar, pro-cathedral of Sylhet

== Church of Bangladesh (Anglican) ==
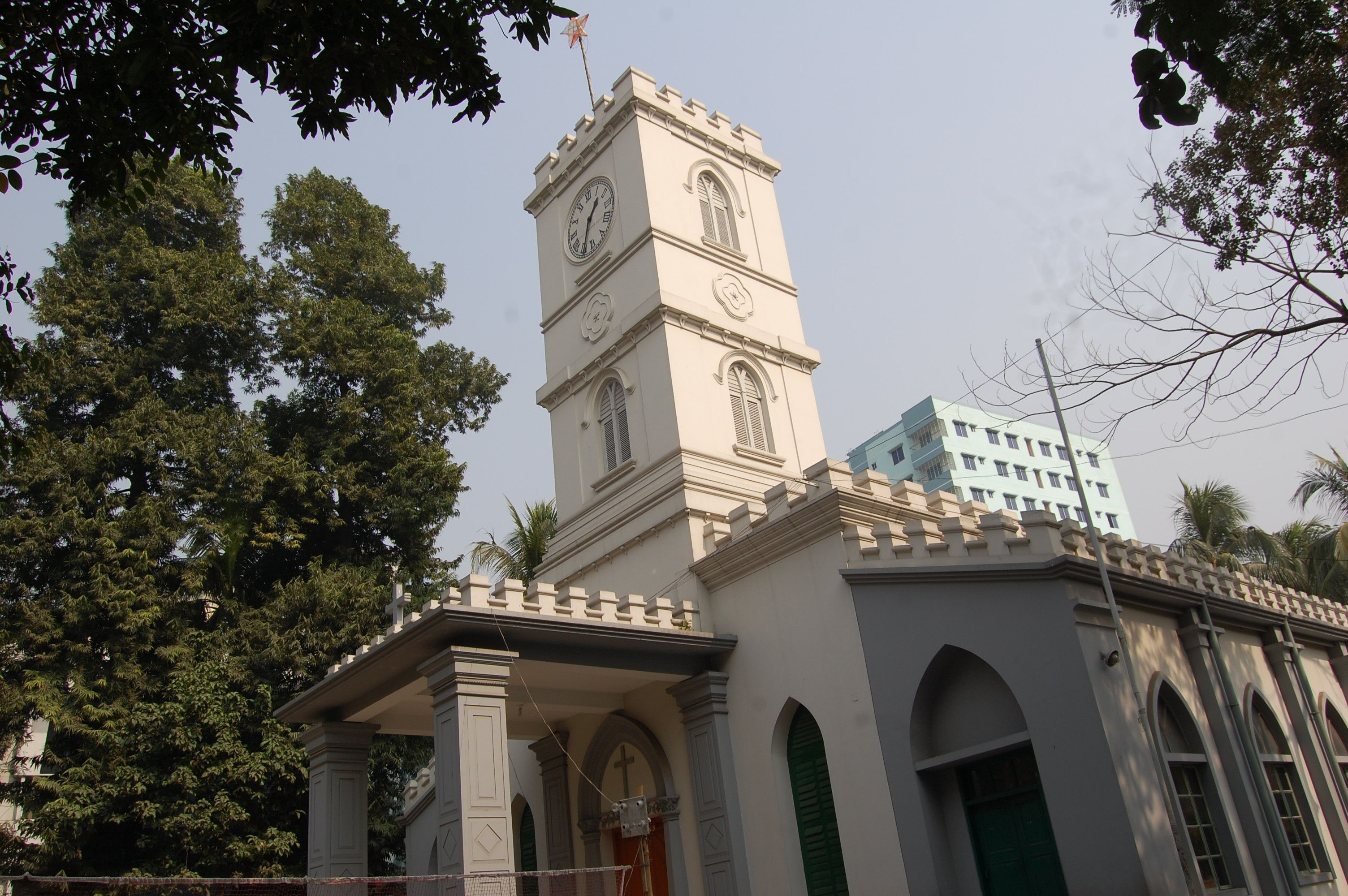
St Thomas's Cathedral, Dhaka

Cathedrals of the Church of Bangladesh:

- St. Thomas’ Cathedral of the Church of Bangladesh in Dhaka
- Oxford Mission Epiphany Cathedral of the Church of Bangladesh in Barishal
- St. John's Cathedral of the Church of Bangladesh in Kushtia

== See also ==
- List of cathedrals
- Christianity in Bangladesh
