= Iraj Mottahedeh =

- President Bishop
- Church: Episcopal Church in Jerusalem and the Middle East
- In office: 2000–2002
- Predecessor: Ghais Malik, Bishop of Egypt
- Successor: Clive Handford, Bishop in Cyprus and the Gulf
- Other posts: Assistant Bishop in Iran (1985–1990); Bishop in Iran (1990–2002); Interim Bishop in Iran (2002–2005); Honorary assistant bishop, Dioceses of Lichfield and of Birmingham (2005–present)

Orders
- Ordination: 1958 (deacon); 1960 (priest)
- Consecration: 1985

Personal details
- Born: 30 April 1932 (age 94)
- Denomination: Anglican
- Education: United Theological College, Bangalore

Iraj Kalimi Mottahedeh (Īraj Mottaḥeda; born April 30, 1932) is a retired Anglican bishop.

Mottahedeh trained for the priesthood at United Theological College, Bangalore and was ordained a deacon in 1958 and a priest in 1960, while serving as curate at St Luke's Isfahan (the See church of the Diocese of Iran) from 1959 until 1962. He then served as vicar successively of three of the diocese's four churches — St Simon the Zealot, Shiraz (1963–1966); St Paul's, Tehran (1966–1974); and St Luke's, Isfahan (1975–1983) — before being appointed Archdeacon of Iran (1983–1985).

On 11 June 1985, he was consecrated as assistant bishop in Iran. Following Hassan Dehqani-Tafti (diocesan Bishop in Iran)'s flight into exile (to the United Kingdom with his British wife) in 1980, Mottahedeh became the only priest in all Iran, and was unable to leave the country; upon Tafti's eventual retirement in 1990, Mottahedeh naturally succeeded him as diocesan Bishop in Iran. During his episcopate, he also served as President Bishop of the Episcopal Church in Jerusalem and the Middle East (2000–2002); he retired in 2002 but continued to serve his diocese as Interim Bishop in Iran until 2004. He then retired to the UK, where he has been licensed since 2005 as an honorary assistant bishop in the Diocese of Lichfield (where he lives at Church Aston, Shropshire) and the neighbouring Diocese of Birmingham.

Anglican Communion titles
Preceded by Hassan Dehqani-Tafti	Bishop in Iran; 1990–2002	Succeeded by Azad Marshall
