= Primates in the Anglican Communion =

Most senior Anglican bishop or archbishop

Primates in the Anglican Communion are the most senior bishop or archbishop of one of the 42 churches of the Anglican Communion. The Church of England has two primates, the archbishop of Canterbury and the archbishop of York.

== Variations ==
Some of these Anglican churches are stand-alone ecclesiastical provinces—such as the Church of the Province of West Africa—while others are national churches comprising several ecclesiastical provinces—such as the Church of England. Since 1978, the Anglican primates have met annually for an Anglican Communion Primates' Meeting at the invitation of the Archbishop of Canterbury, who is regarded as the symbolic leader and primus inter pares of the Anglican primates. While the gathering has no legal jurisdiction, it acts as one of the informal instruments of unity among the autonomous provinces of the communion.

In stand-alone ecclesiastical provinces, the primate is the metropolitan archbishop of the province. In national churches composed of several ecclesiastical provinces, the primate is senior to the metropolitan archbishops of the various provinces, and may also be a metropolitan archbishop. In those churches which do not have a tradition of archiepiscopacy, the primate is a bishop styled "primus" (in the case of the Scottish Episcopal Church), "presiding bishop", "president bishop", "prime bishop" or "primate". In the case of the Episcopal Church in the United States, which is composed of several ecclesiastical provinces, there is a presiding bishop who is its primate, but the individual provinces are not led by metropolitans.

Anglican primates may be attached to a fixed see, e.g., the Archbishop of Canterbury is invariably the Primate of All England, who may be chosen from among sitting metropolitans or diocesan bishops and retain the see—as with, for example, the Primate of the Anglican Church of Australia, or who may have no see, as in the Anglican Church of Canada. Primates are generally chosen by election either by a synod consisting of laity, clergy, and bishops, or by a House of Bishops. In some instances, the primacy is awarded based on seniority among the episcopal college. In the Church of England, the primate, like all bishops, is appointed by the British sovereign, in the capacity of Supreme Governor of the established church, on the advice of the Crown Appointments Commission.

The United Churches of South India, of North India, of Pakistan and of Bangladesh have neither metropolitan bishops or archbishops, nor national primates. Instead, each has a Moderator of the Synod and a Vice-Moderator, elected from among the bishops for a fixed term, who is ranked among the Anglican primates.

== Dual primates ==
In the Church of England and the Church of Ireland, the metropolitan of the second province has since medieval times also been accorded the title of primate. In England, the Archbishop of Canterbury is known as the "Primate of All England" while the Archbishop of York as "Primate of England". In Ireland both the Anglican and Catholic Archbishops of Armagh are titled "Primate of All Ireland"; while both the Anglican and Catholic Archbishops of Dublin are titled "Primate of Ireland". As both of these positions pre-date the 1921 partition, they relate to the whole of Ireland. The junior primates of these churches do not normally participate in the Primates' Meeting.

== List of current primates ==
Key
Active primate	Male primate
Inactive primate	Female primate
Position vacant or acting primate	

There are 42 current primates—including four moderators of united churches—in the worldwide Anglican Communion, according to the Anglican order of precedence, with the Archbishop of Canterbury as primus inter pares first and the others in order of seniority by their first installation to a primacy.

Province	Primate	Person	Date of birth & age	Consecration (Note: The date the person was consecrated as an Anglican (or United Church) bishop.)	Took office (Note: The date the person first became a primate (usually by the confirmation of their election or by their installation, enthronement or investiture in office).)
Church of England	The Archbishop of Canterbury & Primate of All England	Sarah Mullally	26 March 1962 (age 64)	22 July 2015	28 January 2026
Anglican Church of Southern Africa	The Archbishop of Cape Town & Primate of Southern Africa	Thabo Makgoba	15 December 1960 (age 65)	25 May 2002	31 December 2007
Church of the Province of Myanmar (Burma)	The Archbishop of Myanmar & Bishop of Yangon	Stephen Than Myint Oo	1958 (age 67–68)	2005	17 February 2008
Church of the Province of Central Africa	The Archbishop of Central Africa & Bishop of Lusaka	Albert Chama	unknown	2003	20 March 2011
Anglican Church of Kenya	The Primate and Archbishop of All Kenya & Bishop of All Saints' Cathedral	Jackson Ole Sapit	12 June 1964 (age 62)	2005	3 July 2016
Scottish Episcopal Church	The Primus of the Scottish Episcopal Church & Bishop of Moray, Ross and Caithness	Mark Strange	2 November 1961 (age 64)	23 October 2007	27 June 2017
Province of the Episcopal Church of Sudan	The Archbishop of Khartoum & Primate of Sudan	Ezekiel Kondo	1957 (age 68–69)	2003	30 July 2017
Anglican Church in Aotearoa, New Zealand and Polynesia (Note: Three bishops representing each of the three tikanga share the Primacy and the style of Archbishop.)	Te Pīhopa o Aotearoa, Primate of New Zealand & Te Pīhopa o Te Tairāwhiti	Don Tamihere	1972 (age 53–54)	11 March 2017	8 April 2018
Province of the Episcopal Church of South Sudan	The Archbishop of Juba & Primate of South Sudan	Justin Badi Arama	1964 (age 61–62)	2001	22 April 2018
Anglican Church of Tanzania	The Archbishop of Tanzania & Bishop of Tanga	Maimbo Mndolwa	1968 (age 57–58)	4 September 2012	20 May 2018
Church of the Province of Rwanda	The Archbishop of Rwanda & Bishop of Gasabo	Manasseh Gahima	December 12, 1970 (age 55)	28 May 2017	25 October 2026
Church of Bangladesh (Note: The moderators of the Churches of Bangladesh, of North India, of Pakistan and of South India are not, strictly speaking, primates, but they nonetheless rank with and participate alongside the Communion's primates.)	The Moderator of the Church of Bangladesh & Bishop of Dhaka	Samuel Sunil Mankhin	unknown	8 November 2009	5 December 2018
Church of the Province of Melanesia	The Archbishop of Melanesia & Bishop of Central Melanesia	Leonard Dawea	1971 or 1972 (age 54–55)	August 2016	15 September 2019
Church of Uganda	The Archbishop of Uganda & Bishop of Kampala	Stephen Kaziimba	15 August 1962 (age 64)	26 October 2008	1 March 2020
Church of Nigeria	The Archbishop of Abuja & Primate of All Nigeria	Henry Ndukuba	18 July 1961 (age 65)	September 1999	25 March 2020
Church of Ireland	The Archbishop of Armagh & Primate of All Ireland	John McDowell	1956 (age 69–70)	23 September 2011	28 April 2020
Hong Kong Sheng Kung Hui	The Archbishop of Hong Kong & Bishop of Western Kowloon	Andrew Chan	1962 (age 63–64)	25 March 2012	3 January 2021
Church of Pakistan	The Moderator of the Church of Pakistan & Bishop in Raiwind	Azad Marshall	unknown	1994	14 May 2021
Episcopal/Anglican Province of Alexandria	The Archbishop of Alexandria & Bishop of Egypt	Samy Fawzy	1963 (age 62–63)	27 February 2017	8 June 2021
Province of the Anglican Church of the Congo	The Archbishop of the Congo & Bishop of Aru	Georges Titre Ande	unknown	unknown	23 January 2022
Church of the Province of West Africa	The Primate of West Africa, Metropolitan Archbishop of Ghana & Bishop of Asante Mampong	Cyril Kobina Ben-Smith	21 February 1964 (age 62)	May 2011	3 June 2022
Anglican Episcopal Church of Brazil	The Primate of Brazil & Bishop of Amazon	Marinez Rosa dos Santos Bassotto	1971 or 1972 (age 54–55)	2018	23 November 2022
Anglican Church in Aotearoa, New Zealand and Polynesia	The Bishop of Polynesia & Primate of New Zealand	Sione Uluʻilakepa	1965 (age 60–61)	11 March 2023	11 March 2023
Anglican Church of South America	The Presiding Bishop of South America & Bishop of Argentina	Brian Williams	unknown	8 November 2020	7 May 2023
Episcopal Church in Jerusalem and the Middle East	The President Bishop and Primate of the Church in Jerusalem & Archbishop in Jerusalem	Hosam Naoum	1974 (age 51–52)	14 June 2020	12 May 2023
Church of the Province of South East Asia	The Archbishop of South East Asia & Bishop of Singapore	Titus Chung	1964 or 1965 (age 61–62)	18 October 2020	23 January 2024
Anglican Church in Aotearoa, New Zealand and Polynesia	The Senior Bishop of the New Zealand Dioceses, Primate of New Zealand & Bishop of Wellington	Justin Duckworth	1968 (age 57–58)	30 June 2012	22 May 2024
The Episcopal Church in the USA	The Presiding Bishop of the Episcopal Church	Sean W. Rowe	6 February 1975 (age 51)	8 September 2007	1 November 2024
Church of the Province of the Indian Ocean	The Archbishop of the Indian Ocean & Bishop of Fianarantsoa	Gilbert Rateloson Rakotondravelo	unknown	2003	14 December 2024
Anglican Church of Chile	The Archbishop of the Anglican Church of Chile & Bishop of the South of Chile	Enrique Lago	unknown	15 July 2018	12 January 2025
Anglican Church of Mozambique and Angola	The Presiding Bishop of IAMA & Bishop of Zambezia	Vicente Msosa	18 February 1981 (age 45)	25 February 2017	26 January 2025
Episcopal Church in the Philippines	The Prime Bishop of the Philippines	Nestor Poltic	October 27, 1967 (age 58)	1 May 2018	12 March 2025
Anglican Church of Canada	The Primate of the Anglican Church of Canada	Shane Parker	May 22, 1958 (age 68)	31 May 2020	29 June 2025
Church of South India	The Moderator of the Church of South India & Bishop in Karimnagar	K. Reuben Mark	29 March 1961 (age 65)	4 May 2015	21 July 2025
Church in Wales	The Archbishop of Wales & Bishop of Monmouth	Cherry Vann	October 28, 1958 (age 67)	25 January 2020	30 July 2025
Church of North India	The Moderator of the Church of North India & Bishop in Calcutta	Paritosh Canning	unknown	8 July 2018	22 October 2025
Anglican Church of Australia	The Primate of Australia & Bishop of Canberra and Goulburn	Mark Short	1966 (age 59–60)	6 April 2019	1 November 2025
Church in the Province of the West Indies	The Archbishop of the West Indies & Bishop of Belize	Philip S. Wright	10 February 1967 (age 59)	17 November 2005	10 November 2025
Anglican Church of Mexico (Note: Hernández's status as archbishop of Mexico is disputed by two of the five diocesan bishops in the Anglican Church of Mexico; she is recognized as primate and archbishop by the Anglican Communion Office.)	Archbishop of Mexico & Bishop of Mexico	Alba Sally Sue Hernández Garcia	June 23, 1977 (age 49)	29 January 2022	21 March 2026
Anglican Church of Korea	The Presiding Bishop of the Anglican Church of Korea & Bishop of Seoul	Elijah Jang-Whan Kim	unknown	26 September 2024	13 June 2026
Province of the Anglican Church of Burundi	The Archbishop of Burundi & Bishop of Bujumbura	Eraste Bigirimana	1964 (age 61–62)	2005	23 August 2026
Anglican Church in Central America	The Primate of Central America & Bishop of Guatemala	Ramón Ovalle	unknown	24 November 2024	29 August 2026
Anglican Church in Japan	The Primate of Japan & Bishop of Chubu	Renta Nishihara	26 October 1962 (age 64)	24 October 2020	2 September 2026
Anglican Church of Papua New Guinea	The Senior Bishop of Papua New Guinea & Bishop of Aipo Rongo	Nathan Ingen	unknown	unknown	11 May 2020 (Acting)

== See also ==
- Anglican Communion
- List of current patriarchs
