= Hassan Dehqani-Tafti =

Iranian bishop (1920–2008)

The Right Reverend Hassan Dehqani-Tafti
- Anglican Bishop in Iran
- Church: Episcopal Church in Jerusalem and the Middle East
- Diocese: Diocese of Iran
- In office: 1960 to 1990
- Predecessor: William Thompson
- Successor: Iraj Mottahedeh
- Other post: President Bishop (1977–1985)

Orders
- Consecration: c. 1960

Personal details
- Born: 14 May 1920 Taft, Yazd, Iran
- Died: 29 April 2008 (aged 87)
- Denomination: Anglicanism
- Education: University of Tehran* Ridley Hall, Cambridge

Hassan Barnaba Dehqani-Tafti (Hassan Barnābā Dehqānī-Taftī; 14 May 1920 in Taft, Iran – 29 April 2008 in Winchester) was the Anglican Bishop of Iran from 1960 until his retirement in 1990. Dehqani-Tafti was the first ethnic Persian to become a bishop of Iran since the Islamic conquest of Persia in the 7th century.

Dehqani-Tafti spent the last ten years of his episcopate in exile after the Iranian Revolution and an assassination attempt in October 1979, in which his wife, Margaret, was wounded. In May 1980, his 24-year-old son, Bahram, was murdered by Iranian government agents; Bahram is commemorated in the chapel at Monkton Combe School where he was a pupil from 1968 to 1973. Hassan's daughter Guli Francis-Dehqani has been Bishop of Chelmsford since 2021.

== Early life ==
Hassan Barnaba Dehqani-Tafti was born in the small village of Taft, near the city of Yazd, in central Iran. His parents, who were Muslims, were poor. Dehqani-Tafti attended Stuart Memorial College in Isfahan, before moving on to Tehran University, where he trained to become a teacher. He converted to Christianity and was baptised in Isfahan in 1938 and was soon seen a leader of the growing Christian youth group in the city.

He served as an officer in the Iranian Imperial Army from 1943 until 1945. His knowledge of English led him to become an interpreter for British officials in the Middle East. Following the end of World War II, Dehqani-Tafti worked under Anglican bishop William Thompson as a layman in the Diocese of Iran for two years.

== Bishop of Iran ==
Dehqani-Tafti decided to become an Anglican priest and left Iran in 1947 to attend Ridley Hall, Cambridge, a theological college, to prepare for his ordination. After his ordination he returned to Iran and became pastor of St Luke's Anglican Church in Isfahan. He spent ten years at the Isfahan parish and also did some missionary work within Iran. He briefly became pastor of St Paul's Anglican Church in the capital city, Tehran.

He was appointed the Anglican Bishop in Iran to succeed William Thompson. (Dehqani-Tafti had married Thompson's daughter Margaret in an English-Iranian wedding nine years before his ascension as bishop). Dehqani-Tafti became the first ethnic Iranian Christian bishop in Iran since the 7th century. (There had been ethnic Armenian and Assyrian bishops in Iran, but no ethnic Persian bishops until the 20th century.)

As bishop, he concentrated on the growth of the Anglican education system and schools in Iran. He established Iranian secondary schools for girls and boarding schools for boys.

In 1977 he became president bishop of the Episcopal Church in Jerusalem and the Middle East, until 1985.

== In exile ==
After the murder of their son the family settled in the Diocese of Winchester, where Hassan Dehqani-Tafti became an assistant bishop and continued to lead the Anglican diocese of Iran from exile until his 1990 retirement. Margaret died in 2016; they are buried together at Winchester Cathedral.
