= Harry Stileman =

Royal Navy admiral

Rear-Admiral Sir Harry Hampson Stileman, KBE (7 August 1860 – 28 October 1938) was a British Royal Navy officer who also served as Director of Dr Barnardo's Homes from 1920 to 1923.

Stileman was the son of Major-General William Stileman of the Indian Army and the brother of Charles Stileman, later Bishop in Persia, and Leonard Stileman, a first-class cricketer. He joined the Royal Navy as a naval cadet in January 1874 and was promoted midshipman in March 1876, being appointed to the screw sloop HMS Dryad on the North American Station. In 1877 he joined the ironclad screw frigate HMS Shannon on the China Station. He was commissioned sub-lieutenant in 1880. In July 1882 he joined the paddle-wheel despatch vessel HMS Salamis and served in the 1882 Egyptian Campaign.

Until 1888 he successively served in the despatch vessel HMS Lively, the battleship HMS Temeraire and the gunboat HMS Condor with the Mediterranean Fleet, and then the cruiser HMS Rover in the Training Squadron. From 1888 to 1898 he was first lieutenant of successively the screw sloop HMS Mariner on the East Indies Station, the corvette HMS Hyacinth in the Pacific, the battleship HMS Collingwood with the Home Fleet, and the battleship HMS Royal Oak in the Mediterranean.

In December 1898 he was promoted commander and became executive officer of the battleship HMS Mars in the Channel Squadron. On 12 June 1902 he took command of the stoker training ship HMS Nelson at Portsmouth. He was posted to HMS Duke of Wellington in January 1903, as a formal posting for his command of the Portsmouth Naval Depot, and was promoted captain on 31 December 1903 at a relatively young age. He commanded the cruisers HMS Vindictive and HMS Andromeda in the Reserve Fleet at Chatham, the battleship HMS Majestic in the Home Fleet, and the armoured cruiser HMS Duke of Edinburgh in the Channel Fleet.

He retired in September 1909 and was appointed Captain-Superintendent of the Watts Naval School at Elmham, Norfolk, which was owned by Dr Barnardo's Homes.

He returned to service at the outbreak of the First World War in 1914 as Senior Naval Officer at Liverpool. Shortly afterwards he was promoted to rear-admiral. He held the Liverpool appointment throughout the war and was appointed Commander of the Order of the British Empire (CBE) in 1918 and Knight Commander of the Order of the British Empire (KBE) in the 1920 New Year Honours.

After the war he returned to Watts Naval School and in 1920 succeeded William Baker as Director of Dr Barnardo's Homes, the third since Thomas Barnardo himself, holding the post until his final retirement in 1923. An enthusiastic Evangelical Christian like his father and brother, he later became Lay Deputation Secretary with the Bible Churchmen's Missionary Society. He died from a fall at his home at Upper Norwood in 1938.
