= Barnabas Dejen Mondal =

Bangladeshi Christian Archbishop

The Most Reverend B. D. Mondal COB
- 1st Archbishop of Dhaka; Moderator of the Church of Bangladesh
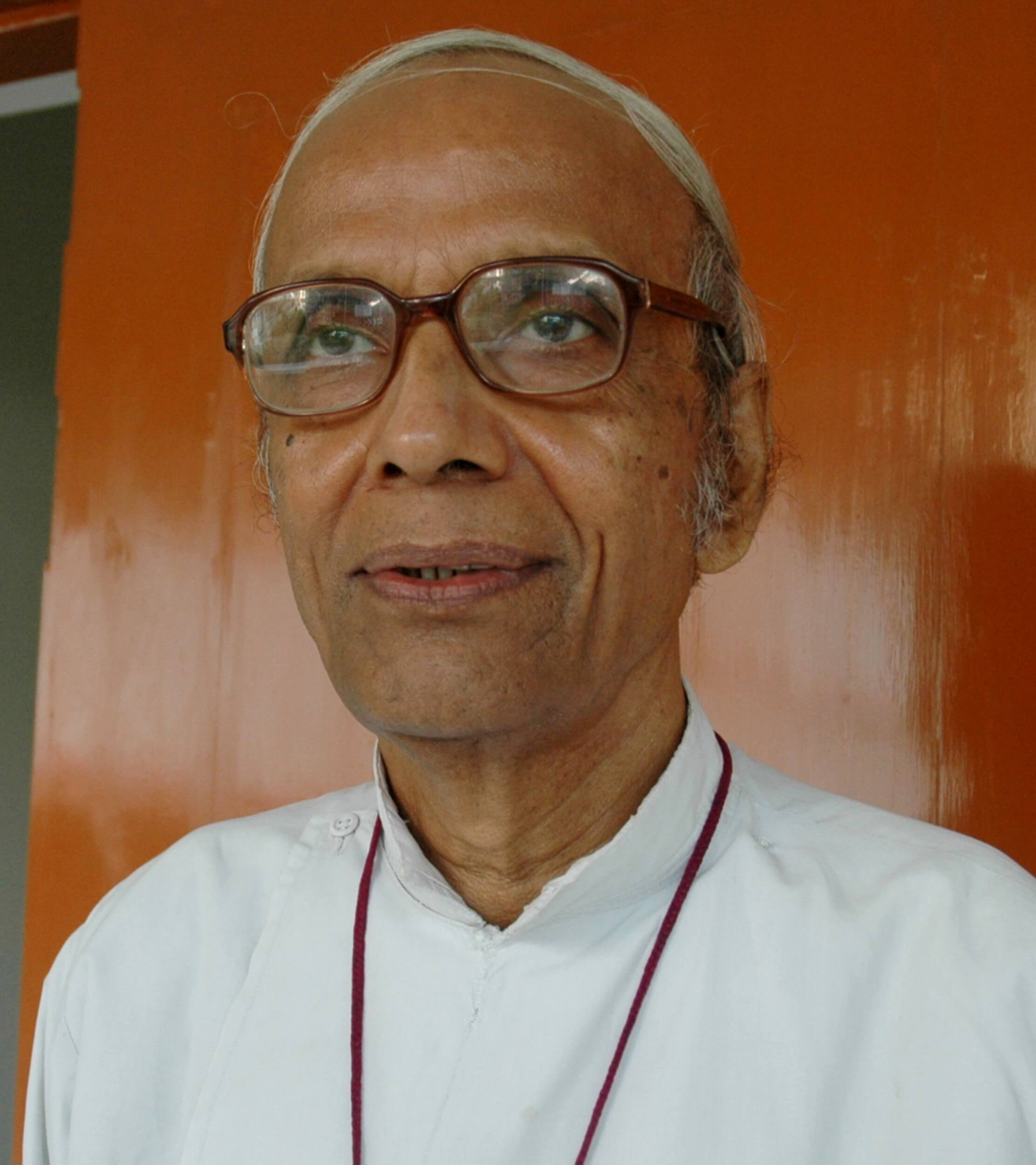
- Church: Church of Bangladesh
- Diocese: Dhaka
- Installed: 1975
- Term ended: 2002
- Predecessor: James D. Blair (as 1st Bishop of Dhaka)
- Successor: Michael Baroi

Orders
- Ordination: 1964
- Consecration: 16 February 1975

Personal details
- Born: Barnabas Dejen Mondal; 1936 or 1937
- Died: June 29, 2019 (aged 82) Dhaka
- Denomination: United Protestant

Styles of Barnabas Dejen Mondal
- Reference style: The Most Reverend
- Spoken style: His Grace
- Religious style: Archbishop

Barnabas Dejen Mondal (died 29 June 2019) was a Bangladeshi United Protestant Archbishop who was the first moderator of the synod of the Church of Bangladesh, and the first bishop of the Church of Bangladesh Diocese of Dhaka. The Church of Bangladesh is a United Protestant denomination formed as a result of a merger between Anglican and Presbyterian denominations in the region.

== Church service ==
In 1965, he became the priest of Oxford Mission Church. He was consecrated as bishop in early 1975. During Bangladesh independence, Mondal was acting as Moderator for the Church of Pakistan's Diocese of Dhaka under Bishop James Blair. A number of Bangladeshi Christians were worried the diocese would be cut off due to independence and asked the Church of North India (CNI) for oversight. The Church of North India awaited permission from the Church of Pakistan, whom issued a declaration allowing for the diocese to leave and establish the new Church of Bangladesh. When Bishop Blair stepped down in 1971, Mondal asked the CNI for 3 members to assist with the episcopal succession.

In the 1980s, due to increasing workload, the Diocese of Dhaka split to create the Diocese of Kushtia with a new bishop. Despite Mondal not being an Archbishop, the Bishophric of Dhaka was recognised as primate within the Anglican Communion as a result. So Mondal became known as "The Most Reverend", a form of address reserved for Archbishops. Even after stepping down as Bishop, Mondal regularly took part in the World Council of Churches meetings and other ecumenical Christian movements. Bishop Mondal died in a hospital in the capital Dhaka on 29 June 2019, at the age of 82.
