= Humphrey Peters =

Pakistani bishop

The Right Reverend Humphrey Peters
- Bishop of Peshawar
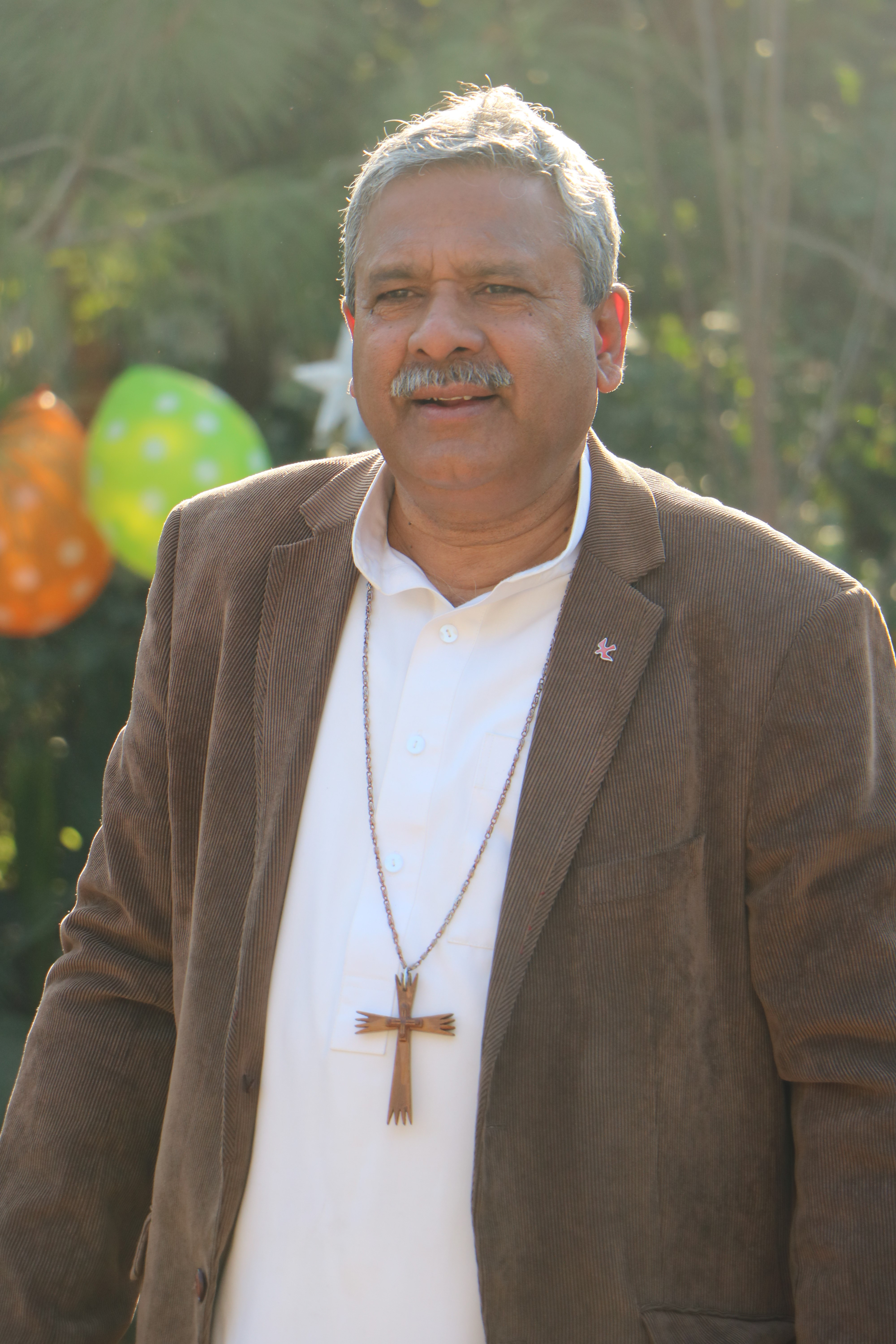
- Church: Church of Pakistan
- Diocese: Peshawar
- Installed: 2011
- Other posts: Moderator and Primate of the Church of Pakistan (2017–2021)

Personal details
- Denomination: Protestant (Anglican in a United Church)

Humphrey Sarfaraz Peters is a Pakistani bishop. He has served as the bishop of the Diocese of Peshawar since 2011 and from 2017 to 2021 as moderator and primate in the Church of Pakistan, a united Protestant church which holds membership in the Anglican Communion, the World Methodist Council and the World Communion of Reformed Churches.

He was part of the original team responsible for envisioning the Anglican Alliance, and has remained closely involved since, as a member of the steering group, and part of the team responsible for appointing the Asia facilitator. He is the former secretary of the development and relief organisation of the diocese.

He attended the Anglican Church in North America meeting of its college of bishops in Orlando, Florida, from 6 to 10 January 2014.

Peters was elected moderator and primate of the Church of Pakistan on 20 May 2017. He was succeeded by Azad Marshall as moderator and primate in 2021.

Anglican Communion titles
Preceded by Mano Rumalshah	Bishop of Peshawar; 2011 – present	Incumbent
Preceded by Samuel Azariah	Moderator and Primate of the Church of Pakistan; 2017 – 2021	Succeeded by Azad Marshall
