= St John's Cathedral, Kushtia =

St. John's Cathedral Church
- সাধু যোহনের ক্যাথেড্রাল গির্জা
- St. John's Cathedral Church
- 23.909545°N 89.126776°E
- Location: NS Road, Thana Para, Kushtia
- Country: Bangladesh
- Denomination: Anglican
- Churchmanship: Church of Bangladesh

History
- Status: Cathedral
- Founded: 1850; 176 years ago
- Dedication: John the Apostle

Architecture
- Functional status: Active
- Architectural type: Gothic architecture

Administration
- Province: Dhaka
- Diocese: Kushtia

Clergy
- Bishop: The Right Reverend Hemen Halder

St. John's Cathedral Church, Kushtia is an Anglican cathedral located in Thana Para, on NS Road in Kushtia, Bangladesh. It belongs to the Diocese of Kushtia of the Church of Bangladesh and was established in 1850. The cathedral is one of the oldest in Bangladesh. The Bishops enthroned in it typically became the Archbishop & Primate of Church of Bangladesh.

== History ==
The church was established in 1850 as a mud house on the western side of Thana Mor, adjacent to NS Road in Kushtia city. In 1898, engineer William Renwick from Watson & Company completed the construction of the new cathedral. The bishop at the time of its founding was the Most Reverend Michael S. Baroi, who came from Indurkani in Barisal district. The present brick-built structure was inaugurated on January 6, 1922, by Mrs. W. B. Renwick. The Church of Bangladesh Diocese of Kushtia was established in 1990–91.
