= St. Thomas' Theological College, Karachi =

Anglican seminary in Karachi, Pakistan

St. Thomas' Theological College is the national seminary of the Church of Pakistan, part of the Anglican communion. It was established in 1987.

Azad Marshall, the Moderator and Primate of the Church of Pakistan, serves as the chairman of the seminary.
