= Paul Sarker =

Former Archbishop of Dhaka of Church of Bangladesh

The Most Reverend Paul Shishir Sarker
- 3rd Primate and Moderator of all Church of Bangladesh; 4th Archbishop of Dhaka
- Church: Church of Bangladesh
- Diocese: Dhaka
- Installed: 2007
- Term ended: 2019
- Predecessor: Michael S. Baroi
- Successor: Samuel Sunil Mankhin
- Previous post: Bishop of Kushtia (2003–2007)

Orders
- Consecration: 2003 by B. D. Mondal

Personal details
- Education: University of Dhaka

Styles of Paul Sarker
- Reference style: The Most Reverend
- Spoken style: His Grace
- Religious style: Archbishop

Paul Shishir Sarker is a Bangladeshi Church of Bangladesh bishop. He was from 2007 to 2019 the Archbishop of Dhaka & the Moderator of the Church of Bangladesh, a united Protestant Church that holds membership in the World Communion of Reformed Churches and the Anglican Communion.

== Ecclesiastical career ==
Sarker was raised as a high-church Anglican. He originally studied at the University of Dhaka, with the purpose of becoming a Bengali literature teacher. He felt the call to ministry at university and he decided to pursue religious studies after finishing his degree. He first studied at the Bishop's College, in Calcutta, India, later moving to the United States, where he earned a M. Div. degree at Louisville Presbyterian Seminary, in Kentucky. After being ordained an Anglican priest, he was elected bishop of the Church of Bangladesh in 2002, and consecrated Bishop in the Diocese of Kushtia on 5 January 2003. He was elected moderator of the Church of Bangladesh in 2007, and translated to the Diocese of Dhaka in October 2009 upon the retirement of the titular bishop, Michael Baroi.

Sarker attended an Anglican Church in North America meeting on 13–15 May 2017, at Holy Cross Cathedral, in Loganville, Georgia, where he and Archbishop Foley Beach, of the ACNA, signed "A Joint Statement on Communion from the Primate of Bangladesh and the Primate of the Anglican Church", to affirm and celebrate the communion between both churches. The Church of Bangladesh was the first united province of the Anglican Communion to declare full communion with the ACNA.

Anglican Communion titles
Preceded by Michael Baroi	Primate & Moderator of the Church of Bangladesh; Bishop of Dhaka; 2009–2019	Succeeded by Samuel Sunil Mankhin
Preceded by Michael Baroi	Bishop of Kushtia; 2003–2009	Succeeded by Samuel Sunil Mankhin
