= William Thompson (bishop) =

Anglican bishop, born 1885

William Jameson Thompson, CBE (27 October 1885 – 17 November 1975) was a long-serving Anglican bishop who spent much of his career in Iran (then Persia).

Educated at Monkton Combe School and Trinity College, Cambridge, he served in the Great War as an officer in the Royal Engineers. Ordained in 1921, he was initially principal of the Stuart Memorial College, Isfahan then archdeacon of the area until his elevation to the episcopate as the third Anglican bishop of Iran in 1935. He retired in 1960 and died 15 years later.

William Thompson's daughter, Margaret, married Hassan Dehqani-Tafti, who succeeded him as Bishop in Iran; their daughter in turn, Guli Francis-Dehqani, became the first bishop of Loughborough and subsequently bishop of Chelmsford.

Anglican Communion titles
Preceded by James Henry Linton	Anglican Bishop in Iran; 1935–1960	Succeeded by Hassan Barnaba Dehqani-Tafti
