= St. Paul Church, New Julfa =

Iranian national heritage site

Church of St. Paul
- Location within Iran

Religion
- Affiliation: Anglican Communion, Church Mission Society
- Status: Active

Location
- Location: New Julfa, Iran
- Coordinates: 32.63061996°N 51.6499123°E

Architecture
- Style: Persian
- Completed: 1875

Church of St. Paul, is an Anglican church in New Julfa, Iran. It is located in Kocher neighbourhood of New Julfa, next to St. Nerses Church.

== History ==
Church Missionary Society (CMS) was active in Persia from 1869, when the Revd. Robert Bruce established a mission station here in New Julfa. It is currently one of four active Anglican churches in Iran, the others are St. Paul Church in Tehran, St. Simon the Zealot Church in Shiraz and St. Luke Church in Isfahan.

== See also ==
- Christianity in Iran
- Anglican Diocese of Iran
