= Diocese of Dhaka =

Diocese of Dhaka or Archdiocese of Dhaka could refer to:

- Church of Bangladesh Diocese of Dhaka
- Roman Catholic Archdiocese of Dhaka
