= Bishop of Dhaka =

Bishop of Dhaka or Archbishop of Dhaka could refer to the ordinary of the:

- Church of Bangladesh Diocese of Dhaka
- Roman Catholic Archdiocese of Dhaka
