= Emmeline Stuart =

Medical missionary in Persia

Emmeline Stuart (1866–1946) was the first female doctor with an official medical degree to join the Church Missionary Society's Persia Mission. Working primarily in Julfa, Isfahan, and Shiraz, she is known primarily for spearheading the development and day-to-day operations of a prominent women's hospital and regional dispensary. She was among the first wave of women physicians and also of single women who undertook this rigorous, and sometimes dangerous, work, and her reports and correspondence are important primary sources for scholars of the era.

== Early life and education ==
Emmeline Stuart was born and raised in Edinburgh. She began her medical studies at Queen Margaret College (Glasgow) in 1891. In 1892 this women's college became part of Glasgow University, which by law was able to admit women students. She earned her M.B. in 1895.

Stuart came from a family of missionaries. She was the older sister of Charlotte Harriet Pidsley, an assistant teacher from the Home and Colonial Training Institution Practising School who became a CMS missionary on 5 July 1898. Stuart also was the cousin of Anne Isabella Stuart, who joined the Persia Mission in Isfahan in 1903 alongside Stuart. Stuart was the niece of Edward Craig Stuart of Edinburgh.

On 19 November 1895 Stuart joined the Church Missionary Society, leaving for her first mission to Julfa, Persia at age 30 on 25 March 1897. She returned to London on 24 September 1902, only to go back to Julfa on 18 September 1903.

== Career ==
Transitioning from the CMS's temporary Punjab and Sindh Mission at the beginning of her missionary work, Stuart spent a considerable amount of time visiting patients in the outskirts of Julfa, though she was generally unable to visit more than one patient a day. Stuart visited villages with her cousin Anne, who read, spoke, and sang Persian hymns far better. During some visits, villagers swarmed her, and she often had to escape amidst large crowds; during others, she was met with fear and resistance from villages where followers of Bábism had been murdered by outsiders a few years prior.

Stuart was among the first to reach Isfahan, alongside Philippa Braine-Hartnell and Jessie Biggs. Legally, no open Christian preaching was allowed; nevertheless, there were more than a hundred baptized women in Isfahan, and schools had been established for both Persian and Parsi ladies.

Stuart took over Mary Bird's work, leading a regional, multi-disciplinary women's hospital in Julfa. Mary Bird wrote of her gratitude to have Stuart join the effort. She had seen the need for a qualified woman medical doctor to join the hospital. Built from sun-dried mud bricks, the one-story men's and women's hospitals sat side-by-side, separated by both a wall and doctors' and nurses' houses. The hospitals served Muslims, Armenians, Jews, Parsis, Bakhtiaris, and Kaskais, charging very small out-patient fees and larger in-patient fees when possible.

Supported at the women's hospital by seven to eight Persian and Armenian nurses, Stuart's work centered around general medicine, surgery, and specialty eye and tubercular care. Stuart's extensive operative work (particularly ovariotomies) attracted both patients from far and wide as well as native doctors, who would observe operating days and learn to perform some major operations. Stuart faced severe understaffing and under-resourcing—often missing sheets, bandages, towels, sponges, and clothing—during her hospital leadership. The local town authorities' construction of new roads also left masses of broken bricks, stones, and debris for the hospital's staff and patients to circumvent.

The women's hospital's gynecological department and midwifery practice grew substantially under Stuart's leadership. Stuart oversaw visits to the wards and patients' homes daily, visits to out-patients three times a week, operations twice a week, and gynecological clinics once a week.

In April 1906, Stuart played a pivotal role in transferring the women's hospital from the suburban Julfa to the urban Isfahan. She organized a week-long operation transporting equipment and materials via donkey, as well as hosted three separate housewarmings (European, Armenian, and Persian) to welcome diverse communities onto hospital premises.

Stuart considered her work evangelism, an expression and extension of Christ's "spiritual love." She formally directed systematic Christian ward teachings every afternoon, out-patient addresses twice a week, and special hospital services once a week, alongside her informal one-on-one conversations with hundreds met through her hospital work. Stuart reported monthly baptisms (totaling a few dozen in all) to the CMS. In one instance, she even helped organize the community's first Persian Christian wedding for hospital assistant Ruth, the daughter of Stuart's longtime servant. In another, Stuart and the hospital staff sang hymns to an untreatable burn victim: a 14-year-old girl set afire by her husband.

In 1919, she addressed local women on her opposition to child marriage; although the audience was receptive, the mullahs condemned the notion, which was deemed to contradict Islamic law.

== Legacy ==
Stuart pioneered the development of distinguished women's in-patient quarters–which had previously been housed in the same building as the men's–within her first year of heading the CMS's Persian Medical Mission. In 1903, she helped negotiate the Persian donation of seven acres of land at Isfahan's city borders for building both men's and women's hospitals and doctors' and nurses' houses. She reserved 15 single wards for private patients who could not only cover their own costs but also help move the hospital towards a more self-supporting standing; to attract these classes of patients, Stuart helped secure medical treatment contracts with local banks and some European business firms.

In April 1905, the women's hospital officially opened under Stuart's supervision with over seventy beds to accommodate patients. Though the men's and women's hospitals were financially part of one medical mission, she ensured that both had their own complete sets of equipment, well-fitted operation rooms, out-patient departments, dispensaries, and rooms for the treatment of special diseases.

In 1923, Stuart opened and operated a dispensary in Shiraz with Donald Carr, a fellow missionary physician; by the time the construction started in earnest in 1929, however, Carr had returned home and left the brunt of the responsibility on Stuart's shoulders. Her successful women's hospital model allowed for regional scaling in Yezd by Urania Latham.

Stuart was one of the few regular speakers at the organization's Annual M.M.A. Meeting.
