= Mary Bird (medical missionary) =

Mary Rebecca Stewart Bird (1859–1914) was a Church Mission Society (CMS) missionary who pioneered Christian ministry to Iranian women and women's medical missions in the CMS.

Although she had received no official medical training, Bird was the first female medical missionary to be employed by the CMS. Born in a weakened state, Bird died in 1914 at the age of fifty-five leaving behind a vibrant medical ministry in Iran.

== Family ==
Mary Bird was born into a family filled with Christian bishops, clergy, politicians, travellers, explorers, and philanthropists. Mary Bird's father—Charles Robinson Bird (1819–1886)—was the rector of the English village Castle Eden, her grandfather—Robert Merttins Bird (1788–1853)—was the head of the Revenue Department of the North West Provinces of India, and Isabella Bird—the intrepid woman traveller, writer, and explorer—was the cousin of Mary Bird's father. William Wilberforce (1759–1833), John Bird Sumner (1780–1862), Archbishop of Canterbury, and his brother Charles Richard Sumner (1790–1874), Bishop of Winchester, are also remotely related to Bird.

== Early life ==
Mary Bird was the fifth child of a family of six. She was so small when she was born that she was nicknamed "Tiny" by her siblings. When she was five years old, a missionary guest of her father's told her stories of Africa, inspiring her to pledge her life to Christian missions.

She worked closely with her father Charles at the Anglican Castle Eden Rectory until his death in 1886. Later she "refused an offer of marriage from one for whom she had the greatest affection, as she had already offered to go abroad and was convinced that her life-work lay in some foreign land, then unknown to her, and that a life of comparative ease in England was not for her".

In 1891, Bird was accepted by the CMS to travel to Iran and work there as a missionary pioneering women's ministry among the Persians. Before she left, Bird prepared by studying for a few months at "The Willows", a training college for women workers in Stoke Newington, England.

== Career ==
=== The CMS ===
The Church Mission Society had established itself in Iran in 1869 but the only women present at that time were married. While married women still provided valuable ministry, in the nineteenth century it increasingly became recognized that single women could also provide unique ministry advantages—such as greater time to be able to devote to working with and evangelizing indigenous women. CMS ministry to specifically women in Iran did not develop in full until Bird was contacted to pursue this area of missions.

=== Medical Missions ===
Bird arrived in Iran with “Miss Stubbs” who was to head up a school for girls. When Bird arrived in 1891, there were only four other CMS missionaries in Iran. In 1894 missionary Dr. Donald Carr had taken over medical work from Dr. E. F. Hoernle who had begun working in Julfa with the CMS in 1879. By the time Bird arrived in 1891, however, the mission had been without a medical missionary for some time.

Bird relates in her book Persian Women and Their Creed that for the first several months of her stay in Iran she devoted herself to learning the Persian and Arabic languages. After this, she attempted to build relationships with Persian women but was for the most part rejected by the community. Bird faced many similar female hardships as Teresa Kearney. When she used her limited first aid skills to cure a small boy of malaria, however, she quickly grew fame as a doctor. In England, she had been considered too weak to work in medicine but Bird saw it as her duty to provide what medical care she could even though she had received no formal training. Bird had medical books sent from England and spent many hours in study to improve her skills. Qualified doctors and nurses after observing Bird's work commended her medical abilities. One doctor commented, “If she had made medicine her profession, she would have been in the front rank of women doctors. She worked with me . . . and I had the very greatest admiration for her work as a ‘doctor.’” Medical work provided a strategic base for evangelism and Bird opened a small dispensary in Isfahan in 1894.

Bird most often worked alone but took every opportunity to work with foreign doctors. In 1897 Dr. Emmeline Stuart took over Bird’s work in Isfahan leaving Bird free to open dispensaries in Yezd and then in Kerman. Bird even expressed working with another medical missionary doctor, John Orlando Summerhayes, in Kerman and praised him. In the last three and a half years of Bird’s time in Iran, ten doctors and six nurses had taken over her work in Isfahan, Yezd, and Kerman. Bird appreciated this because it gave her greater time for teaching and evangelizing.

=== Opposition ===
Throughout her missionary work, Bird experienced inconsistent opposition from Muslim authorities. Her primary concern in Iran was to evangelize the Persians and she included this in her medical work by praying with her patients, speaking to them about the Christian faith, and conducting Bible studies and meetings. Bird’s foreign religious evangelization combined with her popularity created tension between the CMS and the local Muslim mullahs—authorities of Islamic law—who often forbade their people from going to Bird for treatment. Bird often wrote of “spies” sent by the mullahs who would infiltrate her Bible studies and report back to their superiors or who would sit outside her dispensary and warn away patients. At one point, the wife of a mullah even attempted to poison Bird over tea.

Bird's ministry and work remained busy in spite of persecution, however. To a large degree many ignored the prohibitions set out by the mullahs. Since women were forbidden and unwilling to visit a foreign male doctor and the medical needs were so great, many continued to visit Bird when they felt that the mullah's spies were not watching. Bird writes of receiving one hundred and two patients, men and women, in one morning alone. Further, the bans on seeing Bird actually advertised her dispensaries, and, when the mullahs withdrew their bans, many more patients flocked to see her.

Widespread persecution broke out again in 1897 but this time against converts as well as the CMS missionaries. Despite this, the CMS medical ministry grew—in part because the Iranians valued the medical and educational services missionaries offered.

== Final years ==
Mary Bird left her work in Julfa and Isfahan in 1897, traveling back to England on a furlough and spoke of her work in Iran throughout England and Canada, inspiring many. She returned to Persia in 1899 and spent five years continuing her medical and teaching ministries in Yezd and Kerman. When her younger sister married in 1904 and could no longer care for their ailing mother, Bird travelled to Liverpool, England, to take her sister's place. During her eight-year stay there, Bird effectively advocated missions. Bird moved back to Iran in 1911 after her mother's death and resumed her work. After another four years of missionary service, Mary Bird died on August 16, 1914, from typhoid fever.

== Writing ==
Besides her constant written communication with her family, friends, and the CMS headquarters in England, Bird wrote a book in 1899, Persian Women and Their Creed, which outlines some of the CMS missionary work among Iranian women and children, Bird's observations of the Iranian culture, and some personal accounts of medical work and converts. She wrote it in order to raise awareness in England of “the spiritual needs of Persian women.”

== Sources ==
- Bird, Mary. Persian Women and Their Creed. London: Church Missionary Society, Salisbury Square, E.C., 1899.
- Duffy, Joan R. "Bird, Mary Rebecca Stewart." In Biographical Dictionary of Christian Missions. Edited by Gerald H. Anderson, p. 65. New York: Macmillan Reference USA, 1998.
- Francis-Dehqani, Gulnar Eleanor. "CMS Women Missionaries in Iran, 1891-1934: Attitudes Towards Islam and Muslim Women." In Women, Religion and Culture in Iran. Edited by Sarah Ansari and Vanessa Martin, p. 27-50. London: Curzon Press, 2002.
- Keen, Rosemary, "Church Missionary Society Archive," Adam Matthew Publications (accessed March 3, 2011).
- Naghibi, Nima. Rethinking Global Sisterhood: Western Feminism and Iran. Minneapolis, MN: University of Minnesota Press, 2007.
- Rice, Clara C. Mary Bird in Persia. London: Church Missionary Society, Salisbury Square, E.C., 1916.
- Vander Werff, Lyle L. Christian Mission to Muslims: the record. Pasadena, CA: William Carey Library Publishers, 1977.
