= Leonard Stileman-Gibbard =

English cricketer

Personal information
- Full name: Leonard Gibbard Stileman-Gibbard
- Born: 22 June 1856; Bombay, Bombay Presidency, British India
- Died: 19 September 1939 (aged 83); Sharnbrook, Bedfordshire, England
- Batting: Right-handed
- Bowling: Right-arm roundarm slow

Domestic team information
- Years: Team
- 1901–1905: Bedfordshire

Career statistics
Competition	First-class
Matches	1
Runs scored	55
Batting average	27.50
100s/50s	–/–
Top score	46
Catches/stumpings	1/–
- Source: ESPNcricinfo, 28 July 2019

Leonard Gibbard Stileman-Gibbard DL JP born Leonard Gibbard Stileman (22 June 1856 – 19 September 1939) was an English first-class cricketer.

The son of Major-General William Stileman, he was born in British India at Bombay in June 1856. He was educated in Britain at the Abderdeen Gymnasium and Brighton College, before going up to Trinity College, Cambridge. He succeeded his uncle, John Gibbard at Sharnbrook House in 1871, assuming the additional name of Gibbard in 1878. He made a single appearance in first-class cricket for the South against the touring Australians at Hastings in 1886. Batting twice in the match, he was dismissed in the South's first-innings for 46 runs by George Giffen, while in their second-innings he was dismissed by the same bowler for 9 runs. From November 1890 he served as a justice of the peace for Bedfordshire. He played minor counties cricket for Bedfordshire from 1901–05, making thirteen appearances in the Minor Counties Championship. He was made a deputy lieutenant for Bedfordshire in March 1906. He served as a deputy lieutenant until January 1939, when he resigned his commission. He died at Sharnbrook in September 1939. He was the brother of Harry Stileman and Charles Stileman.
