= Guli Francis-Dehqani =

Iranian-born British Anglican bishop and Lord Spiritual (born 1966)

The Right Reverend Dr Guli Francis-Dehqani
- Bishop of Chelmsford
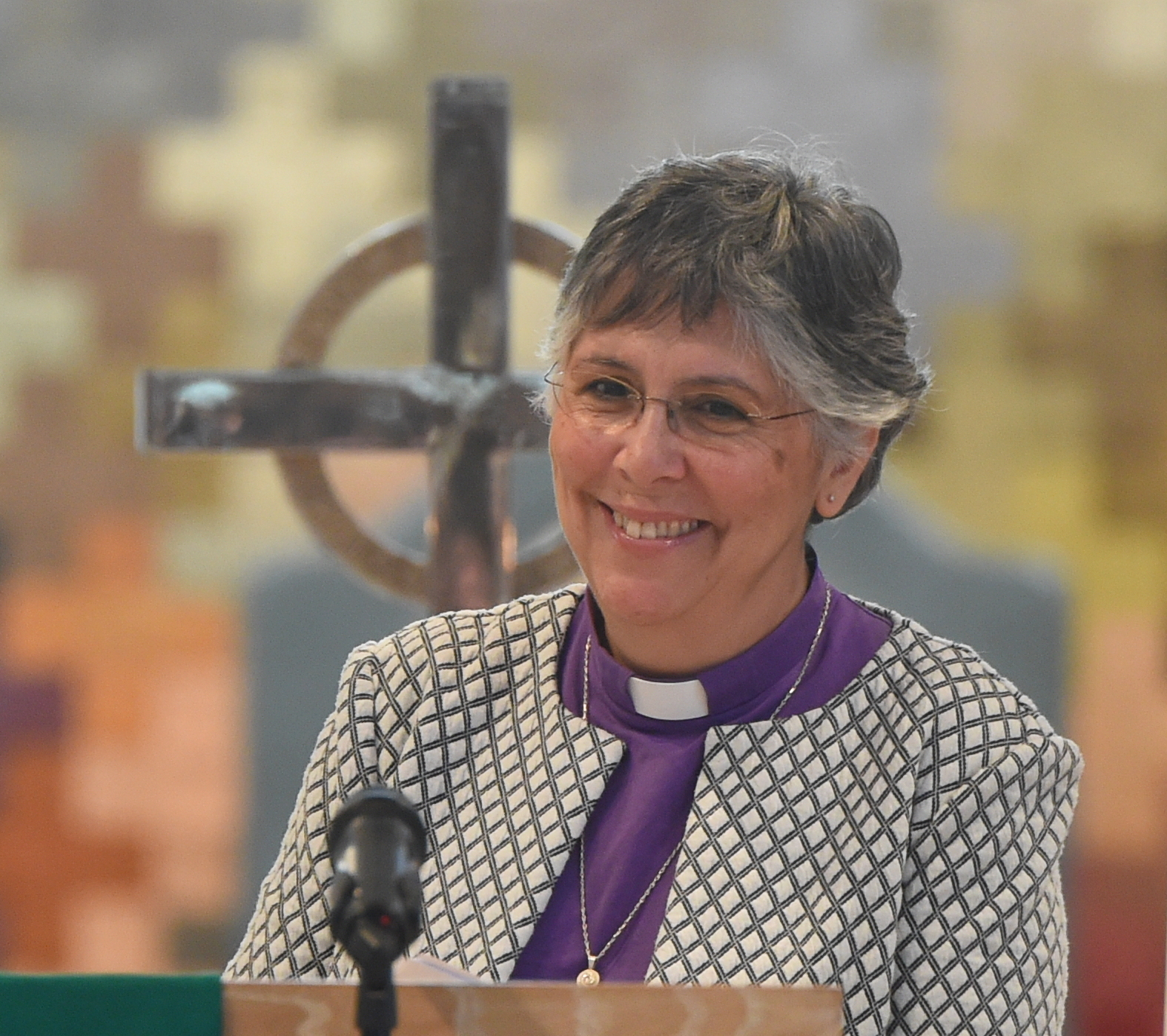
- Francis-Dehqani in 2024
- Church: Church of England
- Diocese: Diocese of Chelmsford
- In office: 2021–present
- Previous posts: Bishop of Loughborough (2017–2021); Diocesan Adviser for Women's Ministry (2012–2017) and Curate Training Officer (2011–2017), Diocese of Peterborough

Orders
- Ordination: 1998 (deacon) by Tom Butler; 1999 (priest) by Wilfred Wood
- Consecration: 30 November 2017 by Justin Welby

Personal details
- Born: Gulnar Eleanor Dehqani-Tafti; 18 June 1966 (age 60) Isfahan, Isfahan Province, Pahlavi Iran
- Denomination: Anglicanism
- Parents: Hassan Dehqani-Tafti & Margaret Thompson
- Spouse: Lee Francis-Dehqani (né Francis)
- Children: 3
- Education: University of Nottingham; University of Bristol

Member of the House of Lords
- Lord Spiritual
- Bishop of Chelmsford; 1 November 2021

Gulnar Eleanor "Guli" Francis-Dehqani (born 18 June 1966) is an Iranian-born British Anglican bishop. She became Bishop of Chelmsford in 2021. She served as the first Bishop of Loughborough, the suffragan bishop in the Diocese of Leicester, from 2017 to 2021.

== Early life and education ==
Guli Dehqani-Tafti was born in Isfahan, Iran, in 1966. Her father Hassan Dehqani-Tafti (1920–2008) was the Anglican Bishop in Iran from 1961 until his retirement in 1990, serving also as President Bishop of the Episcopal Church in Jerusalem and the Middle East, 1976–1986. Her mother, Margaret, was a daughter of William Thompson (Bishop in Iran, 1935–1960). In October 1979, after the Iranian Revolution, her parents were attacked in an assassination attempt which left her mother wounded, and her 24-year-old brother, Bahram, was murdered by Iranian government agents in May 1980. When she was 14, her family was forced to leave the country in the wake of the Iranian Revolution; the family settled in Hampshire, England, where Hassan remained a bishop in exile.

She was educated at Clarendon School for Girls, a private boarding school in Bedfordshire at the time she attended. She went on to study music at the University of Nottingham, graduating with a Bachelor of Arts (BA) degree in 1989. She studied theology at the University of Bristol, graduating with a Master of Arts (MA) degree in 1994 and a Doctor of Philosophy (PhD) in 1999. Her doctoral thesis was titled Religious feminism in an age of empire: CMS women missionaries in Iran, 1869–1934. From 1995 to 1998, she trained for ordination at the South East Institute of Theological Education.

== Ordained ministry ==
Francis-Dehqani was ordained in the Church of England as a deacon at Michaelmas (27 September) 1998 by Tom Butler, Bishop of Southwark, at Southwark Cathedral. She was ordained a priest the following Michaelmas (2 October 1999) by Wilfred Wood, Bishop of Croydon, at All Saints', Kingston-upon-Thames. From 1998 to 2002, she served her curacy at St Mary the Virgin, Mortlake with East Sheen, in the Diocese of Southwark. From 2002 to 2004 she was a chaplain to the Royal Academy of Music and to St Marylebone C of E School. In 2004, she stepped down from full-time ministry to raise her children. From 2004 to 2011, she held Permission to Officiate in the Diocese of Peterborough. She also worked at the University of Northampton Multi-Faith Chaplaincy between 2009 and 2010, "helping the chaplaincy team develop a more effective multi-faith approach".

In 2011, Francis-Dehqani returned to full-time ministry, having been appointed Curate Training Officer for the Diocese of Peterborough. She was additionally appointed the diocese's Adviser for Women's Ministry in 2012. From 2013 to 2017 she was a Member of the General Synod; she was later an elected suffragan member, 2019–2021, and ex officio as a diocesan from 2021. She was made an honorary canon of Peterborough Cathedral in November 2016.

=== Episcopal ministry ===
On 11 July 2017, it was announced that Francis-Dehqani would become the first Bishop of Loughborough, the sole suffragan bishop of the Diocese of Leicester. In addition to her suffragan duties, she also had "a focus on supporting Black, Asian and Minority Ethnic (BAME) clergy, lay workers and congregations" within the diocese. She was consecrated a bishop during a service at Canterbury Cathedral on 30 November 2017. This made her the first female bishop from a minority ethnic community in the Church of England.

It was announced on 17 December 2020 that Francis-Dehqani was to transfer to Chelmsford in 2021, becoming the diocesan bishop of the Diocese of Chelmsford (East London and Essex). Her canonical election by the college of canons of Chelmsford Cathedral took place by teleconference on 26 January 2021; she was confirmed of her election, by which she legally took her new see, on 11 March 2021.

She joined the House of Lords as one of the Lords Spiritual, under the Lords Spiritual (Women) Act 2015 on 25 June 2021. In May 2023, she was one of three female bishops to take part in the Coronation of Charles III and Camilla. In July 2025 she was the bookmakers' favourite to succeed Justin Welby, who had resigned as Archbishop of Canterbury that January.

=== Views ===
In 2023, she was one of 44 Church of England bishops who signed an open letter supporting the use of the Prayers of Love and Faith (i.e. blessings for same-sex couples) and called for "Guidance being issued without delay that includes the removal of all restrictions on clergy entering same-sex civil marriages, and on bishops ordaining and licensing such clergy".

== Personal life ==
She is married to Lee Francis-Dehqani, a fellow Anglican priest and canon: at the time of her appointment as bishop he was serving as Team Rector of Oakham and Rural Dean of Rutland and in 2018 was appointed Team Rector of the Fosse Team in Leicester Diocese. Together they have three children.
