= Samuel Sunil Mankhin =

Anglican Archbishop of the Diocese of Dhaka

The Most Reverend Samuel Sunil Mankhin COB
- Primate and Moderator of the Church of Bangladesh; 5th Archbishop of Dhaka
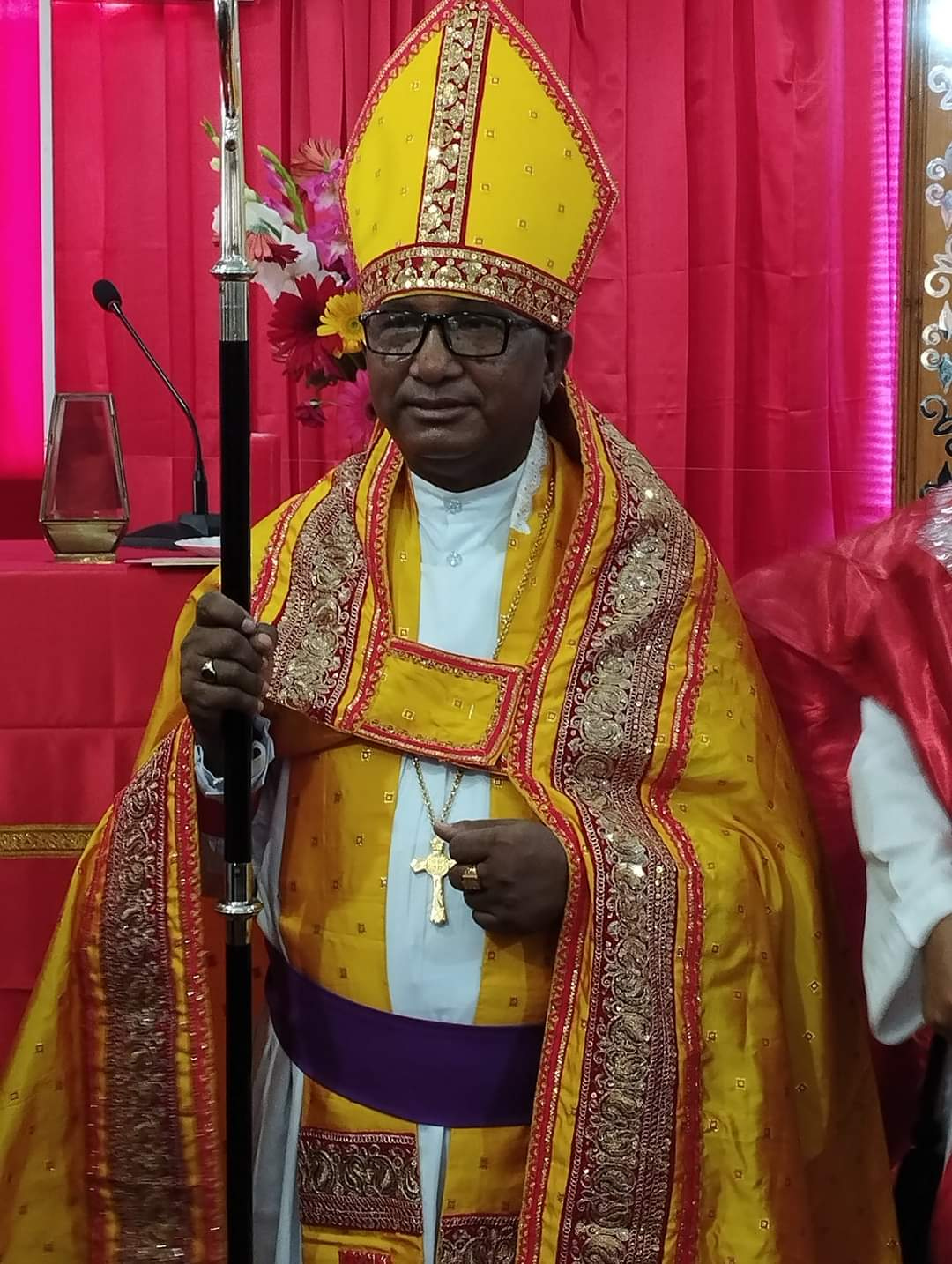
- Official portrait of the Bishop of Dhaka
- Church: Church of Bangladesh
- Province: Dhaka
- Metropolis: Dhaka
- Diocese: Dhaka
- Installed: 5 December 2018
- Predecessor: Paul Sarker
- Other posts: Bishop of Kushtia (2009–2019); General secretary of the Global South Fellowship of Anglican Churches

Orders
- Consecration: 8 November 2009, St Mary's Church, Haluaghat

Personal details
- Born: Samuel Sunil Mankhin
- Residence: St Thomas Church, Dhaka
- Education: University of Dhaka
- Motto: "Shepherd of my people"
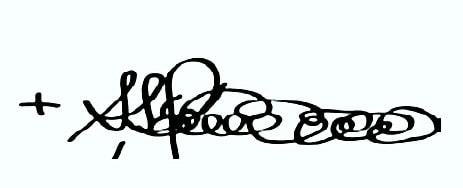
- Signature

- Coat of arms

Styles of Samuel Sunil Mankhin
- Reference style: The Most Reverend
- Spoken style: His Grace
- Religious style: Archbishop

Samuel Sunil Mankhin is a metropolitan archbishop who is currently serving since 2018 as Bishop of Dhaka and the primate and moderator of the Church of Bangladesh, a United Protestant denomination resulting from the merger of Anglican and Presbyterian denominations in that country. Mankhin was previously the Bishop of Kushtia, served 2009 to 2018.

Anglican Communion titles
Preceded by Paul Sarker	Moderator of the Church of Bangladesh; Bishop of Dhaka; 2018–present	Incumbent
Preceded by Paul Sarker	Bishop of Kushtia; 2009–2019	Succeeded by Hemen Halder
