= St Thomas Church, Dhaka =

St. Thomas Cathedral Church
- সাধু থোমার ক্যাথেড্রাল চার্চ
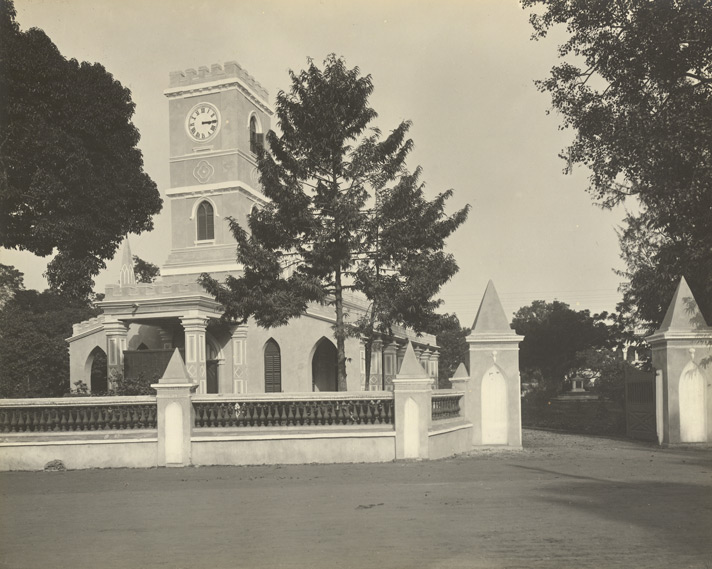
- St Thomas's in 1904 by Fritz Kapp
- St. Thomas Cathedral Church
- 23.7102°N 90.4122°E
- Location: Johnson Road, Dhaka
- Country: Bangladesh
- Denomination: Anglican
- Churchmanship: Church of Bangladesh

History
- Status: Cathedral
- Dedication: Thomas the Apostle

Architecture
- Functional status: Active
- Architectural type: Gothic architecture
- Groundbreaking: 1819
- Completed: 1821

Administration
- Province: Dhaka
- Metropolis: Dhaka
- Archdiocese: Dhaka
- Deanery: Dhaka

Clergy
- Archbishop: The Most Reverend Samuel Sunil Mankhin
- Dean: The Very Reverend Simson Mazumder
- Priest: The Very Reverend Emmanuel Mollick

St. Thomas Cathedral Church is a cathedral belonging to the Diocese of Dhaka of the Church of Bangladesh, which is a United Protestant denomination that formed as a result of a merger between the Anglican and Presbyterian churches in the region. It is the seat of the diocese. The church premise was in an area of lush greeneries with the famous Bahadur Shah Park at a stone's throw distance on the south. The north–south axial Nawabpur Road/Johnson Road, the most important commercial street connecting the old part of the city with the new, is on the west and separated the area from the court, Bank, DC's office and Jagannath University buildings across it. In fact the church overlooking the greens is a major focal of the city centre in the nineteenth century.

== History ==
Construction of the church, located on the east side of Johnson Road, began in 1819 and was completed in 1821. It was inaugurated on 10 July 1824 by Bishop Reginald Heber of Calcutta (Kolkata) while he was visiting Dacca (Dhaka). It has served as cathedral church since 1951. It is said that the convicts from Dhaka Jail gave their labour to build this church as well.

The Lutherans, Anglicans, Presbyterians, and Congregationalists of East Bengal, as well as various Methodist and Baptist bodies joined to form the Church of Pakistan in the early 1970s. After Bangladesh won its independence from Pakistan in 1971, the Diocese of Dhaka emerged from the Church of Pakistan as the independent Church of Bangladesh.

The church is led by most reverend Paul S. Sarkar who in January 2003 became the third bishop of the Church of Bangladesh. The 71 parishes are divided into 2 dioceses. The church has approximately 15,600 members (2005). It has been a member of the World Council of Churches since 1975 and functions as part of the larger worldwide Anglican Communion.

== Architectural features ==
The attraction of this building, built after the style of east churches, with a square clock tower with arch windows on its walls. The square clock tower rises in two stages, its top is embattled. The roof used wooden battens on iron joists. The roofs of the verandas on either side are set upon sloppy korhikath. The delicate stone and brick works of this white plastered building are still as immaculate as it has been for nearly two centuries. A small porch leads to the entrance of the church supported on four columns which are of perpendicular gothic design on top of the entrance.

The west end of the nave is dominated by two grooved columns that are not weight bearing. The floor have tiles. There are two columns at the back of the rectangular nave which leads to a pulpit through an arch. The pulpit is rectangular and has a brass cross on the wall at the back. The altar, at the east end of the nave, is constructed of wood and also has a brass cross on top of it. There are elegant curved chairs for congregation. A stone font on the back of the nave. The walls of the church are adorned with stone tablets commemorating some of the members of the church. Even most of the thick teak furniture, altar, and ablution bowl (for baptising) in marble are still unblemished and in good working condition. However, the open colonnades around two sides of the nave (central axial hall) were walled up later.

In 2005 the church authority has undertaken a massive renovation of the building. Archaeologist Sufi Mostafizur Rahman writes that, "Though the church is small in size, it is one of the most attractive ones in Bangladesh".
