= Church of St. Simon the Zealot =

Iranian national heritage site

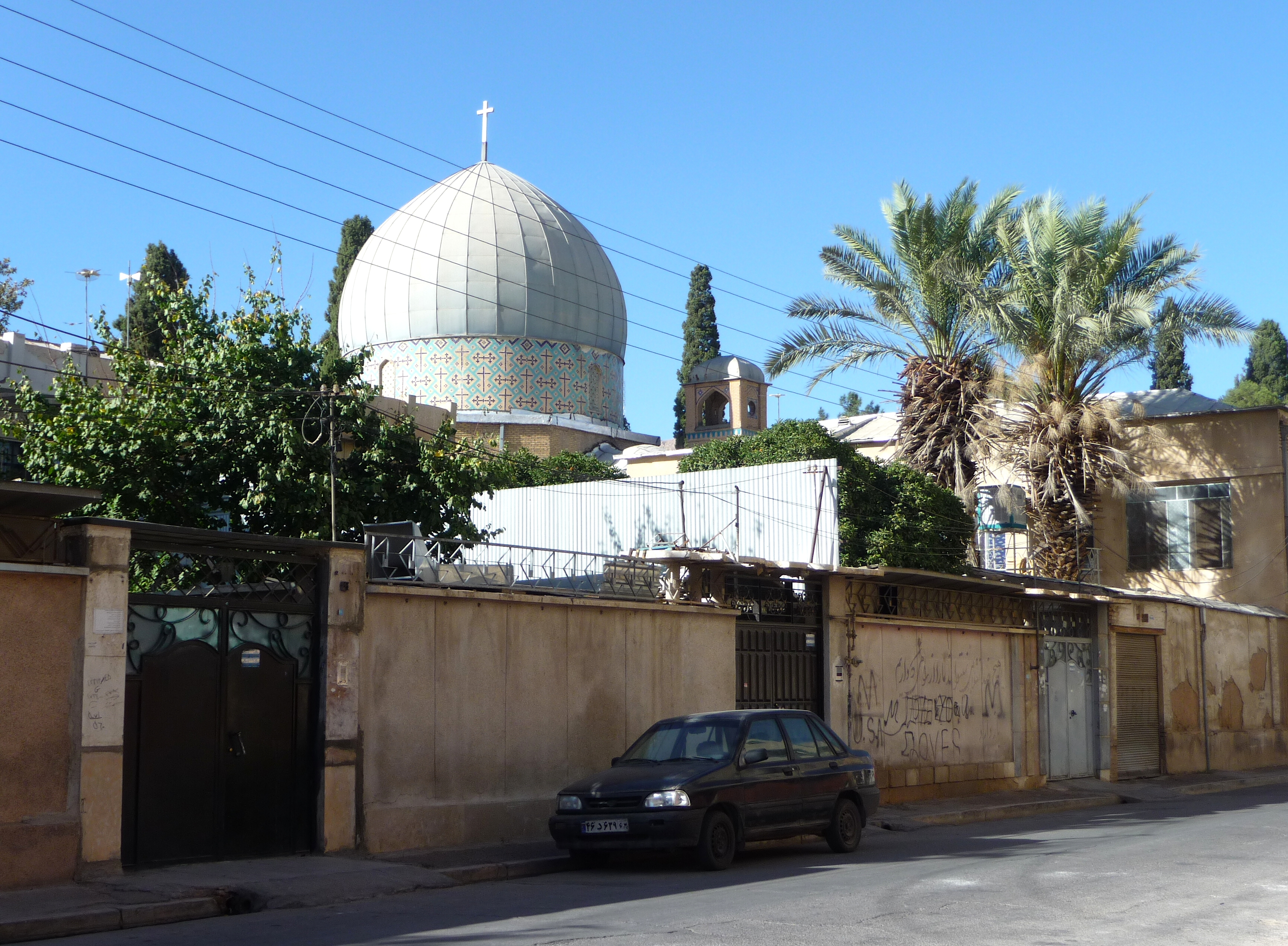
- Church of St. Simon the Zealot, Shiraz

- Location within Iran

Religion
- Affiliation: Anglican Communion, Church Mission Society
- Status: Active

Location
- Location: Shiraz, Iran
- Coordinates: 29.61988272°N 52.53486961°E

Architecture
- Style: Persian
- Completed: 1938

Church of Simon the Zealot, is an Anglican church in Shiraz, Iran. It is located on Zand Avenue in Shiraz, next to Shiraz Christian Mission Hospital.

== History ==
Church Missionary Society (CMS) was active in Persia from 1869, when the Revd. Robert Bruce established a mission station in New Julfa. In 1938, the Church of St. Luke was consecrated in Shiraz by Revd. Ralph Norman Sharp. It is currently one of four active Anglican churches in Iran, the others are St. Paul Church in Tehran, St. Luke Church in Isfahan and St. Paul Church in New Julfa.

== See also ==
- Christianity in Iran
- Anglican Diocese of Iran

== Gallery ==
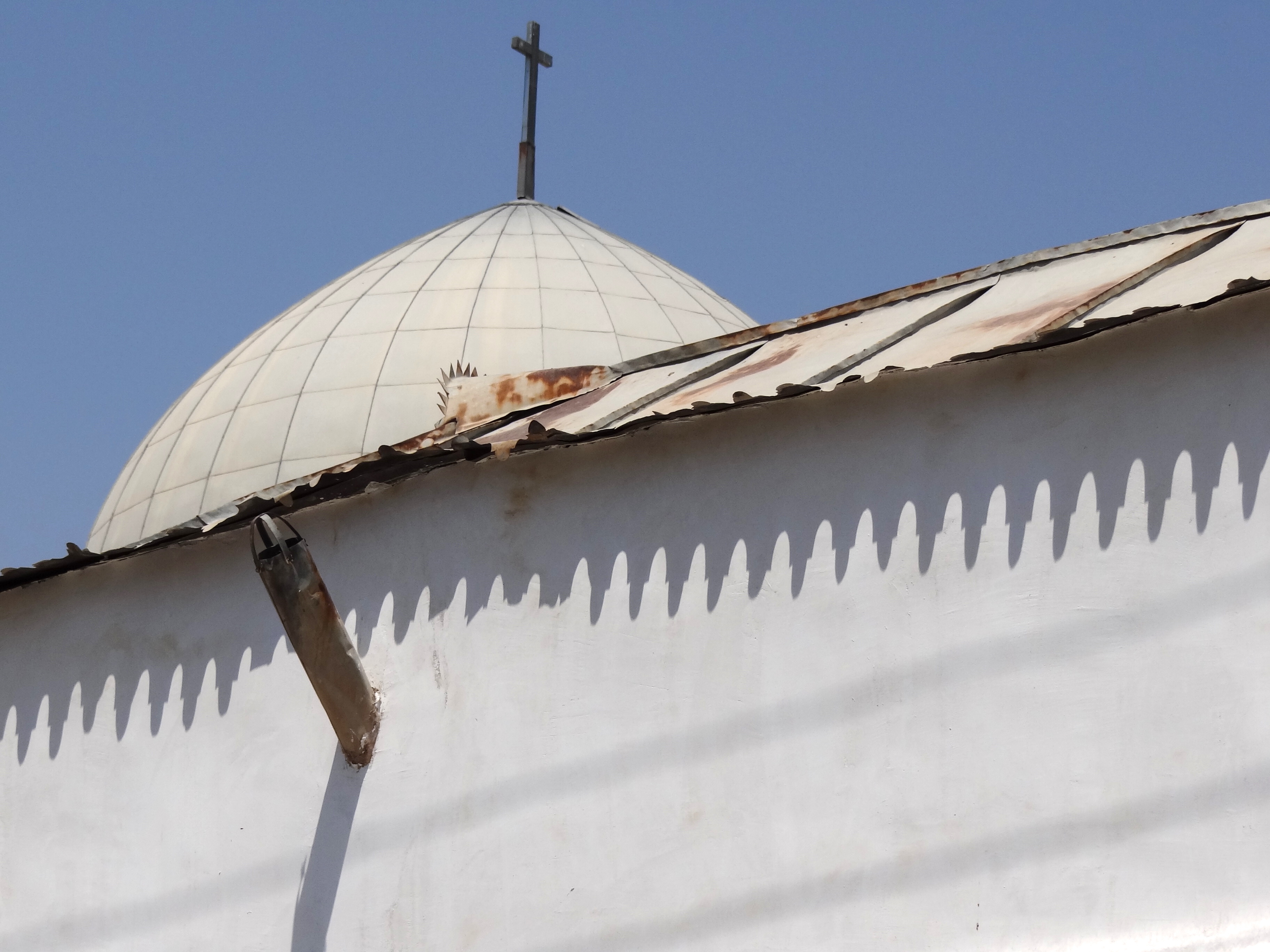
Dome of Church of St. Simon the Zealot.
