= James Linton (bishop) =

British Anglican priest (1879–1958)

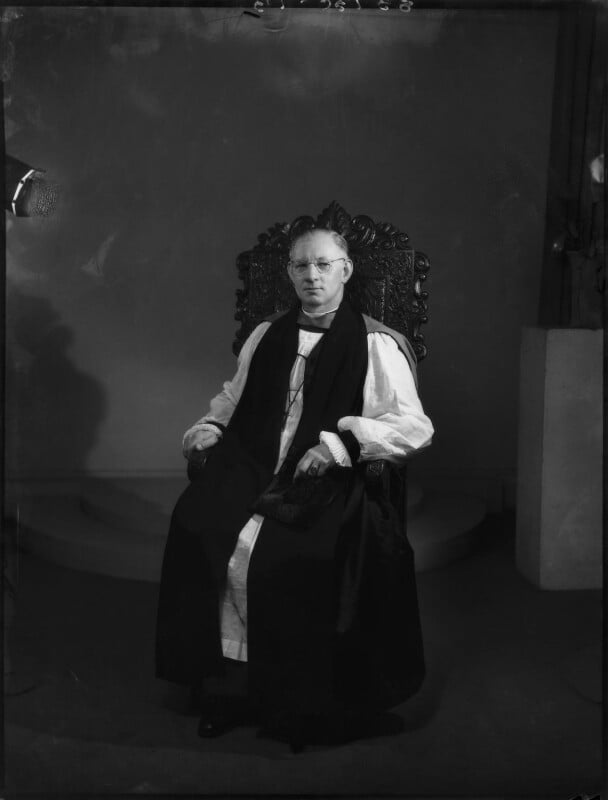
Linton in 1939

The Right Reverend James Henry Linton, (9 February 1879 – 2 June 1958) was a British Anglican priest who served as Bishop in Persia from 1917 to 1935.

Educated at Durham, and ordained in 1904, he was Vice-Principal of the CMS Training College in Oyo and then the Principal of Stuart Memorial College, Isfahan until his appointment to the episcopate as Bishop in Persia in 1917. He served until 1935 when he became Rector of Handsworth, retiring in 1954 and an Assistant Bishop of Birmingham (1937–1958).

Religious titles
Preceded by Charles Stileman	Bishop in Persia; 1917-1935	Succeeded by William Thompson
