= Pakistan Methodist Church =

Protestant Christian denomination

Pakistan Methodist Church is a Protestant Christian denomination of Pakistan. It is part of Church of Pakistan.

== History ==
The Methodist Church in Pakistan originated from Methodist missions in North India, with a presence in cities such as New Delhi, Calcutta, Bareilly, Lucknow, and Hyderabad. Bishop John Taylor, notable for his evangelism, significantly contributed to the spread of Methodism, particularly along railway lines in Pakistan, establishing churches in Lahore, Raiwind, Khanewal, Multan, Bahawalpur, Quetta, Hyderabad, and Karachi.

Following the Partition of India in 1947, the Indus River Annual Conference was separated from the Methodist Church in India. This era was characterized by widespread migration and resettlement among various religious communities. Bishop Clement D. Rockey, initially based in Bareilly, India, was assigned to lead the newly formed Indus River Conference, eventually relocating to Lahore in 1953 to oversee Methodist activities in West Pakistan, south of Lahore.

The post-Partition period saw the arrival of several missionaries, including Rev. Earl Rugg, Clyde and Sally Stuntz, and Rev. Hoyt and Edna Smith, along with medical professionals such as Clifford S. and Ruth Trimmer. The 1950s and 1960s brought a second wave of missionaries, among them Rev. Robert and Evelyn Maring, Dick and Dorothy Lockman, and others.

In 1960, the Methodist General Conference designated Pakistan as a priority area for a four-year period, focusing on church development, education, and medical projects. The Karachi Provisional Annual Conference was established in 1962 to administer the southern regions of Karachi, Hyderabad, and Quetta. After Bishop Rockey's retirement in 1964, Bishop Hobart B. Amstutz, previously based in Singapore, was appointed to oversee the Methodist Church in Pakistan.

The 1968 General Conference sanctioned the formation of a Central Conference in Pakistan, leading to the election of Rev. John Victor Samuel as bishop.

In 1973, the Methodist Church of Pakistan decided to join the United Church of Pakistan.
