= Donald William Carr =

English medical missionary

Donald William Carr (1866 - 1952) was an English medical missionary affiliated with the Church Missionary Society (CMS) in Persia. He founded and designed a men's and women's hospital, the Isa Bin Maryam Hospital, in Julfa, Isfahan, Iran, and the Shiraz Christian Missionary Hospital.

== Early life and education ==
Donald William Carr was born on April 16, 1866 in Derbyshire, England to Edmund Carr and Emma Anne Stileman. His brother, Edmund Stileman Carr, was also a medical missionary. He married Agnes Mary Nevill, a nurse, on August 11, 1891. He had three children.

He was educated at the Trinity College of Cambridge for his BA and London Hospital for his medical training.

== Career ==
Carr was accepted as a missionary with the Church Missionary Society on October 3, 1893. He traveled to Persia Medical Mission in Julfa on April 19, 1894. He worked closely with Mary Bird and Emmeline Stuart throughout his career while opening regional dispensaries.

Carr took over medical operations of the local clinic in Julfa, transforming it from three wards accommodating six men and seven women, in conjunction with the Church Missionary Society, to a functioning hospital. The transformation included the newfound use of clean linen and hospital garments, as well as a high standard of antisepsis in the hospital. The hospital's capacity expanded beyond the original clinic capacity. As many as 500 to 600 patients passed through the hospital during the year of 1900. He returned to England on sick leave in 1898 but returned to service in 1901. The new modern hospital in Isfahan officially opened in 1902 under Carr on land donated by a local businessman Amin al-Sharia. The hospital also offered medical education and was authorized by the government to issue certificates in "medical proficiency". The government provided the first public funding to the hospital in 1914.

In 1922, after much resistance from locals, he was finally able to move to Shiraz and start the first CMS clinic in the region. He worked with Dr. Emmeline Stuart and Alice Verinder, a British nurse. The clinic was initially just a building in a garden, but in 1924, after a land donation from Hajj Muhammad Husayn Namazi, a maternity hospital was built. The operation eventually evolved into a large general hospital with financial assistance from the Indo-European Telegraph Company, as part of a deal on the terms that the CMS would take care of the IETC's own employees. The expanded facilities included separate male and female wards, a midwifery department, and an outpatient department. Eventually, it also engaged in medical education as a teaching hospital and was allowed by the Iranian government to hand out medical licensing certificates.
