= Charles Stileman =

British Anglican bishop (1863–1925)

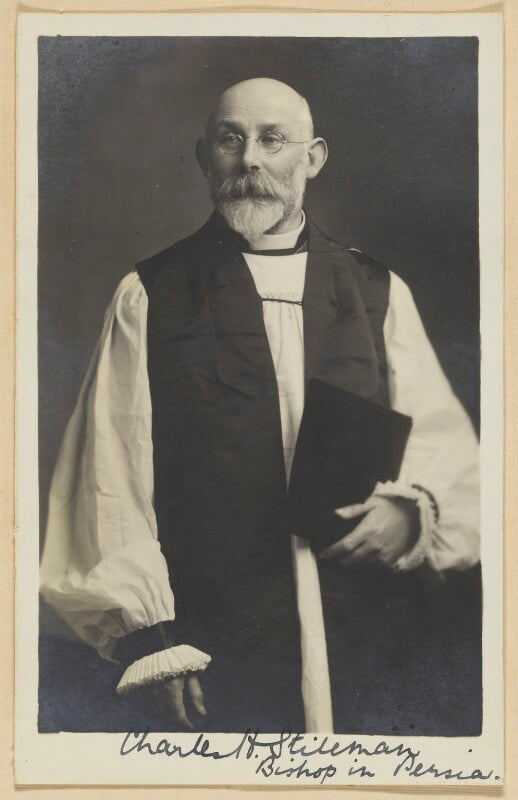
Stileman, c. 1912

Charles Harvey Stileman (15 February 1863 – 23 February 1925) was an Anglican clergyman, the inaugural Anglican Bishop in Persia from 1912 until 1917.

Charles Harvey Stileman was educated at Repton School and Trinity College, Cambridge. Ordained in 1887, his first post was as a curate at St Peter's North Shields. He subsequently became a missionary in the Middle East. His last post before elevation to the episcopate was as secretary of the Church of England Zenana Mission. On his return to England he was Vicar of Emmanuel Church, Clifton, Bristol. He died on 23 February 1925. His brother, Leonard, was a first-class cricketer.

Religious titles
New title	Bishop in Persia; 1912–1917	Succeeded by James Linton
