= Church of Bangladesh Diocese of Kushtia =

Diocese of Church of Bangladesh

Diocese of Kushtia কুষ্টিয়া ধর্মপ্রদেশ

Church of Bangladesh
- Incumbent: Hemen Halder from 2019 as Bishop of Kushtia
- Style: The Right Reverend

Location
- Country: Bangladesh
- Ecclesiastical province: Dhaka
- Metropolitan: Dhaka
- Deaneries: 2

Statistics
- Area: 20,835.15 km^{2} (8,044.50 sq mi)
- Parishes: 44
- Members: 10, 000

Information
- First holder: Michael S. Baroi
- Rite: Church of Bangladesh Book of Common Prayer
- Established: 1990
- Cathedral: St. John's Cathedral Church

Current leadership
- Parent church: Church of Bangladesh
- Governance: Episcopal
- Bishop: Hemen Halder
- Metropolitan Archbishop: Samuel Sunil Mankhin
- Bishops emeritus: Michael S. Baroi

The Church of Bangladesh Diocese of Kushtia is one of three dioceses of the Church of Bangladesh (a United Protestant denomination). It was formed in 1990 out of the Diocese of Dhaka, and its first three bishops each went on to become archbishop of Dhaka and primate & moderator of the Church of Bangladesh.

== Structure ==
Based in Kushtia, the Diocese of Kushtia comprises two deaneries. Bollovpur Deanery, in the southwestern area of Bangladesh, is the largest deanery by membership in the Church of Bangladesh with about 5,000 members in 13 parishes. Protestant work in this area has included a hospital and schools formed by the Church Mission Society in the 19th century. The deanery holds an annual spiritual revival called Dhannya Budhbar Savha.

The Rajshahi deanery has 3,000 members in 31 parishes, most of them part of the Santal people, which grew out of English Presbyterian missions. The deanery hosts an annual spiritual revival called Helmel Sova. The moderator of the COB chairs the board of the Christian Mission Hospital Rajshahi, built by Presbyterian missionaries in 1926.

== List of bishops ==
1. Michael Baroi (1990–2003)
2. Paul Sarker (2003–2009)
3. Samuel Sunil Mankhin (2009–2019)
4. Hemen Halder (2019–present)
