= Church of St. Luke, Isfahan =

Iranian national heritage site

Church of St. Luke
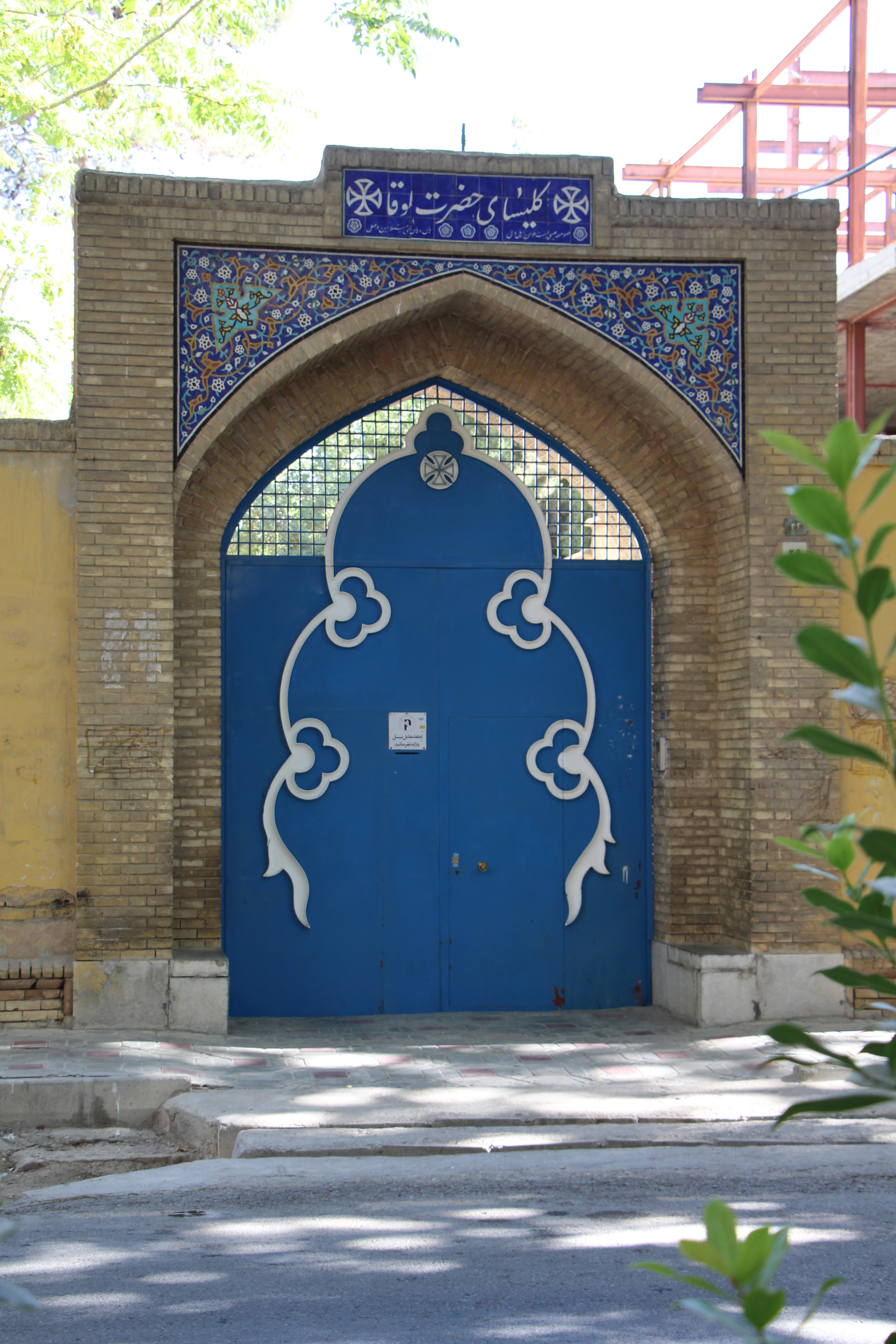
- Entrance to the Anglican Church of St. Luke

- Location within Iran

Religion
- Affiliation: Anglican Communion, Church Mission Society
- Status: Active

Location
- Location: Isfahan, Iran
- Coordinates: 32.64912715°N 51.66404754°E

Architecture
- Style: Persian
- Completed: 1909

Church of St. Luke, is an Anglican church in Isfahan, Iran. It is located in Abbasabad neighbourhood of Isfahan, next to Isa Bin Maryam Hospital.

== History ==
The Church Missionary Society (CMS) was active in Persia from 1869, when the Revd. Robert Bruce established a mission station in New Julfa. In 1909, the Church of St. Luke was consecrated in Isfahan. It is currently one of four active Anglican churches in Iran, the others are St. Paul Church in Tehran, St. Simon the Zealot Church in Shiraz and St. Paul Church in New Julfa.

== See also ==
- Christianity in Iran
- Anglican Diocese of Iran
- Edward Stuart
