= Adab High School =

Public school in Isfahan, Iran

Coordinates: 32.6524166°N 51.6738053°E

- دبیرستان ادب
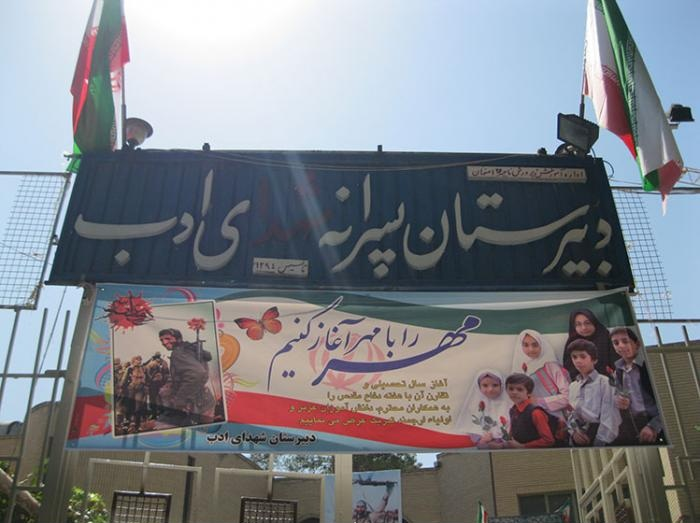
- Hasht Behest Street, Isfahan, Iran

Information
- Former names: Stuart Memorial College (1915–1939)
- Type: Public
- Religious affiliation: British Anglican Church
- Established: c. 1869 AD
- Founder: Rev. Robert Bruce
- Enrollment: 2000
- Website: www.adabisf.ir

Adab High School (Persian: دبیرستان ادب) in Isfahan, Iran, was established in the early 19th century by British Anglican missionaries as an all-boys private school. It was later converted to a secular public school and college under the direction of Isa Sadiq (a man of letters and Minister of Education) and under the administration of Sayyid Yahya DowlatAbadi. It was formerly known as Stuart Memorial College.

== History ==
Adab High School was founded circa 1869 in the neighborhood of Julfa (now New Julfa), by Rev. Robert Bruce a British Anglican missionary (CMS). In the early years the school enrollment was low and sporadic. At the time of its inception, the school offered modern physics and chemistry laboratories. The campus quarters was moved in 1915. From 1915 until 1939, the school was renamed Stuart Memorial College, after Anglican bishop Edward Stuart (1827–1911) who had served his mission in Isfahan, Persia from 1879 until 1894.

It was the only all-boys high school in Isfahan with its own swimming pool and soccer field.
