= Diocese of Iran =

Anglican diocese

Location
- Country: Iran
- Territory: Iran
- Ecclesiastical province: Province of Jerusalem and the Middle East

Statistics
- Area: 1,648,195 km^{2} (636,372 sq mi)

Information
- Denomination: Anglican
- Established: 1912
- Cathedral: Saint Luke's Church, Isfahan, Iran

Current leadership
- Bishop: currently overseen by the Primate, the Most Reverend Hosam Naoum

Map
- Diocese of Jerusalem Diocese of Cyprus and the Persian Gulf Diocese of Iran

Website
- http://www.dioceseofiran.org

The Diocese of Iran is one of the three dioceses of the Anglican Province of Jerusalem and the Middle East. The diocese was established in 1912 as the Diocese of Persia and was incorporated into the Jerusalem Archbishopric in 1957. The most recent bishop was Azad Marshall, until 2016. His title is Bishop in Iran, rather than the often expected Bishop of Iran.

== History ==
The Revd. Henry Martyn visited Iran in 1811. He reached Shiraz, then travelled to Tabriz to attempt to present the Shah with his Persian translation of the New Testament. The British ambassador to the Shah, was unable to bring about a meeting, but did deliver the manuscript to the Shah. The Church Missionary Society (CMS) was active in Iran from 1869, when the Revdd Robert Bruce established a mission station at Julfa in Isfahan. The beginnings of the Anglican Diocese of Iran were in 1883 when Valpy French, an Episcopal bishop, came to Lahore and traveled through Iran.

After Bishop Edward Stuart resigned as the Bishop of Waiapu in New Zealand, he served as a CMS missionary in Julfa from 1894 to 1911.

In 1912, Charles Stileman became the first bishop of the new diocese. James Linton was consecrated as the next bishop in 1919. On 18 October 1935, William Thompson was consecrated as Iran's third bishop in St Paul's Cathedral, London. On 25 April 1961, he was succeeded by Hassan Dehqani-Tafti, the first native Persian bishop of Iran. On 11 June 1986, Iraj Mottahedeh was consecrated as the fifth bishop of Iran.

When Iraj Mottahedeh retired in 2004, the Central Synod of the Episcopal Church in Jerusalem and the Middle East invited Azad Marshall, a bishop of the Church of Pakistan and an associate bishop in the Diocese of Cyprus and the Gulf, to provide episcopal oversight to the Diocese of Iran as its bishop. He was installed on 5 August 2007 in St Paul's Church in Tehran by Mouneer Anis, Bishop of Egypt and Presiding Bishop of the ECJME.

=== Medical and education missions ===
The CMS mission in Iran expanded to include Kerman, Yazd (1893) and Shiraz (1900), with Mary Bird, a medical missionary, establishing hospitals at Kerman and Yazd. The CMS mission operated hospitals and schools. Responding to growing demand for clinical services in the mission clinic Dr. Bird started, Dr. Donald Carr founded and designed a men's and women's hospital, the Isa Bin Maryam Hospital, in Julfa, Isfahan, Iran, and the Shiraz Christian Missionary Hospital.

== Bishops of the Diocese of Persia/Iran ==
Arms of the Diocese of Iran

- 1912–1917: Charles Stileman
- 1917–1935: James Linton
- 1935–1960: William Thompson
- 1960–1990: Hassan Dehqani-Tafti

- 1985–1990: Iraj Mottahedeh, Assistant Bishop

- 1985–2002: Iraj Mottahedeh (interim bishop 2002–2004)
- 2007–2016: Azad Marshall (became Bishop in Raiwind)
- 2016–2017: Payam Mosavi (Employer's Representative Assistant Bishop Of Bishop Azad Marshall )
- 2016–present: vacant
  - 2017–2019: Albert Walters, Vicar-General
- 2019–present: Payam Mosavi (Employer's Representative Assistant Bishop Of Bishop Michael Augustine Owen Lewis)

== See also ==
- Christianity in Iran
- Episcopal Church in Jerusalem and the Middle East
- Church Missionary Society in the Middle East and North Africa
