= Church of Bangladesh Diocese of Dhaka =

Metropolitan Diocese of Church of Bangladesh

Metropolitan Diocese of Dhaka ঢাকা মহাধর্মপ্রদেশ

Church of Bangladesh
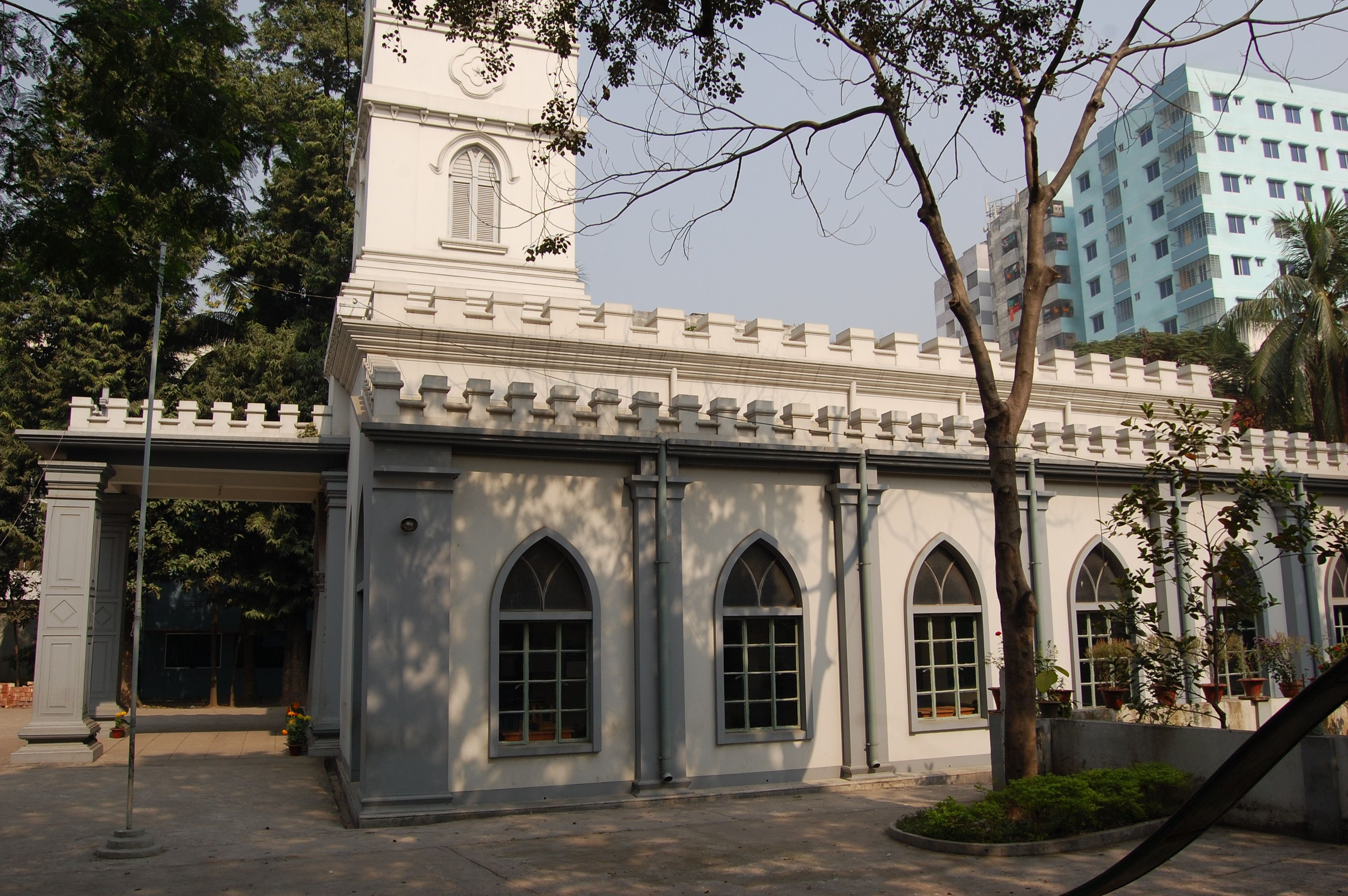
- St Thomas Cathedral, Dhaka

- Coat of Arm of Dhaka's Archbishop
- Incumbent; Samuel Sunil Mankhin
- Style: The Most Reverend

Location
- Country: Bangladesh
- Ecclesiastical province: Dhaka
- Deaneries: 3

Statistics
- Area: 21,381.52 km^{2} (8,255.45 sq mi)
- Parishes: 29
- Members: 12500+ (as of December, 2024)

Information
- First holder: James D. Blair
- Formation: 1952
- Rite: Church of Bangladesh Book of Common Prayer
- Established: 1956
- Cathedral: St Thomas Church, Dhaka

Current leadership
- Parent church: Church of Bangladesh
- Governance: Episcopal
- Metropolitan Archbishop: Samuel Sunil Mankhin
- Suffragans: Diocese of Kushtia Diocese of Barisal
- Dean: The Very Reverend Emmanuel Mollick
- Bishops emeritus: James D. Blair Barnabas Dejen Mondal

The Church of Bangladesh Metropolitan Diocese of Dhaka is the metropolitan and main diocese of Church of Bangladesh (a United Protestant denomination). It was erected in 1956 by dividing the Diocese of Calcutta; the diocese was originally called "East Bengal" and covered all of East Pakistan after the partition of India. It was a part of the Anglican Church of India, Pakistan, Burma and Ceylon until the formation of the united Protestant Church of Pakistan in 1970, which merged Lutheran, Anglican, and Presbyterian denominations in that country. It became the sole diocese of the Church of Bangladesh upon the church's 30 April 1974 independence. Since it was split to create Kushtia diocese, the bishop of Dhaka has usually also been moderator and primate of the Church of Bangladesh. The other two dioceses of Church of Bangladesh are under its governance.

== List of bishops ==
- 1956–1975: James D. Blair (assistant bishop of Calcutta (for East Bengal), 1951–1956)
- 1975–2003: B. D. Mondal (consecrated 16 February 1975, Oxford Mission Church)
- 2003–2009: Michael S. Baroi (installed 24 January 2003)
- 2009 – 18 February 2019 (ret.): Paul Shishir Sarker (Moderator 2009 – 19 November 2018)
- 2019–present: Samuel Sunil Mankhin
