= Church of Bangladesh =

United Protestant Church in Bangladesh

- চার্চ অব বাংলাদেশ
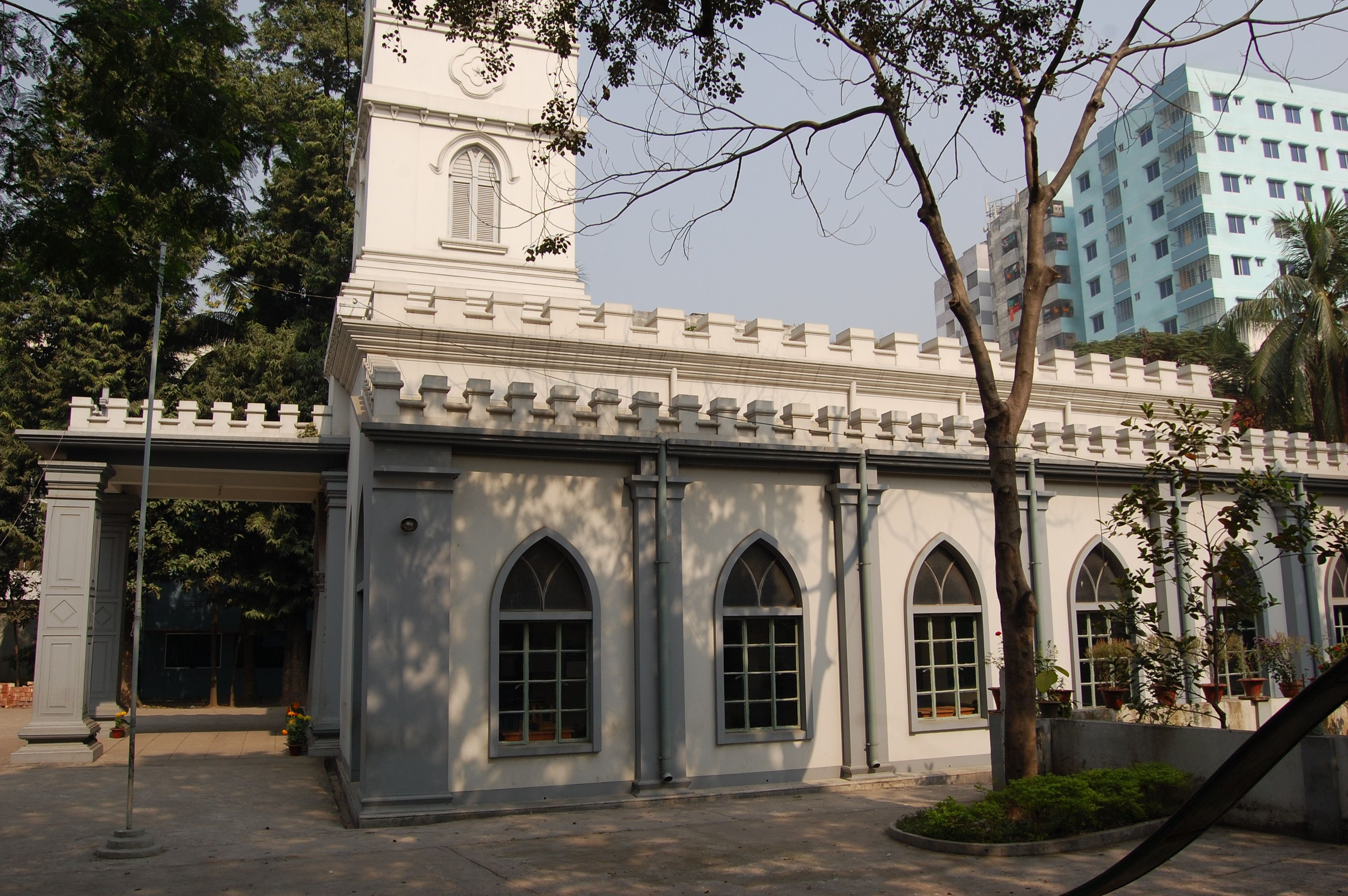
- St. Thomas Cathedral of the Metropolitan Diocese of Dhaka
- Abbreviation: C of B
- Classification: Protestant
- Orientation: Anglican; Presbyterian
- Scripture: Holy Bible
- Theology: Reformed
- Polity: Mixed polity with episcopal and presbyterian elements
- Governance: Episcopal
- Structure: Synod
- Moderator: Samuel Sunil Mankhin
- Cathedral: 3
- Associations: Anglican Communion, World Communion of Reformed Churches, Global South Fellowship of Anglican Churches
- Region: Bangladesh
- Headquarters: Moderator & Dhaka Diocesan Bishop's Office; 54 Johnson Road, Sadarghat; Dhaka 1100; Bangladesh
- Territory: Bangladesh
- Origin: Dhaka, Bangladesh
- Separated from: Church of Pakistan
- Parishes: 151
- Number of followers: 22,600
- Priests: 31
- Missionaries: Brotherhood of the Epiphany; Sisterhood of the Epiphany; Christa Sevika Sangha; St. Mary’s Sisterhood; St. Paul’s Brother Hood
- Hospitals: 2
- Nursing homes: 1
- Primary schools: 44
- Tertiary institutions: 1 (St. Andrew's Theology College, Bangladesh)
- Other name: CoB
- Publications: Kapot (কপোত)
- Official website: churchofbangladesh.org

The Church of Bangladesh (Bengali: চার্চ অব বাংলাদেশ) is a united Protestant church formed by the union of various Protestant churches in Bangladesh, principally the Anglican and Presbyterian denominations. The Church of Bangladesh is a member of the Anglican Communion and the World Communion of Reformed Churches.

The history of the plantation of this united Protestant church is quite old. Presbyterianism and Anglicanism in Bengal became established from the time of British rule in colonial India; since the Anglican Church in England is called the Church of England, the Anglican Church in undivided India was known as the Church of India, Burma and Ceylon, which eventually became the Church of North India, Church of South India and Church of Pakistan; after the independence of Bangladesh from Pakistan, the Church of Bangladesh emerged from the Church of Pakistan.

The Church of Bangladesh currently has three dioceses – Dhaka Diocese (Archbishop Samuel Sunil Mankhin), Kushtia Diocese (Bishop Hemen Halder), and Barisal Diocese (Bishop Shourabh Pholia). There are a total of 8 deaneries and 115 parishes under the three dioceses. The population is about 22,600. Membership is diverse, including many different cultures. About half of the total members are from the Garo, Santal, Marma and Chakma ethnic groups of Bangladesh.

== History ==
The Church of Bangladesh came into being as the outcome of the separation of East Bengal province from Pakistan. This started as a movement which focused on language and took shape through the liberation war in 1971, which created an independent Bangladesh. The Synod of the Church of Pakistan on 30 April 1974 declared and endorsed a free and independent status for the Church of Bangladesh. The Church of Bangladesh brings together the Anglican and English Presbyterian Churches.

Following the creation of the Church of Bangladesh, efforts were made to increase local leadership. B. D. Mondal was consecrated as the first national bishop of Dhaka Diocese in 1975. He tried to follow the path of Bishop Blair, by encouraging the active participation of lay leaders from all sections of the church congregations. After the creation of the synod, B. D. Mondal became the first moderator of the Church of Bangladesh and Michael S. Baroi the deputy moderator. At the time of B. D. Mondal's retirement, a new bishop was elected, and Paul Sarker, in January 2003, became the third national bishop of the Church of Bangladesh. Although the title is not employed in this United Protestant denomination, since the acknowledgement of the bishop of Dhaka as a primate within the Anglican Communion, he has been entitled to the usual archepiscopal prefix "the Most Reverend". The current Primate and Archbishop of Church of Bangladesh is Samuel Mankhin, enthroned on 5 December 2018.

== The Ecclesiastical Synod of Church of Bangladesh (CoB Bishops Conference) ==
The Ecclesiastical Synod of Church of Bangladesh, commonly known as COB Bishops Conference, in Savar, the episcopal commission of the Church of Bangladesh. It was made through the partition from Church of Pakistan synod, after Bangladesh's Independence. Then Archbishop Barnabas Dejen Mondal, built this episcopal commission known as "Synod", in 1974.

Synod of the Church of Bangladesh
- The Ecclesiastical Synod of Church of Bangladesh
- Bishops Conference of CoB
- Abbreviation: ESCoB
- Predecessor: Synod of Church of Pakistan
- Formation: August 15, 1974; 52 years ago
- Founder: Barnabas Dejen Mondal
- Legal status: Ecclesiastical Office
- Headquarters: Savar
- Location: Dhaka, Bangladesh
- Moderator of Synod & Archbishop of Dhaka: Samuel Sunil Mankhin
- Deputy Moderator of Synod: Shourabh Pholia (Bishop of Barisal)
- Secretary of Synod: Rev. Fr. Dr. John P. Hira, OMEC
- Parent organization: Church of Bangladesh
- Budget: Unpublished
- Website: cob.org

== Bishops list of CoB ==
Name	Image	Country	See	Diocese	Coat of Arms	Term installed	Term ended	Death
Most Revd. James D. Blair	-	British India, India	See of Calcutta later Dhaka	East Bengal (as Assistant bishop of Calcutta), later Bishop of Dhaka	-	1969	1973	Died
Most Revd. Barnabas Dejen Mondal	-	India, Pakistan, Bangladesh (from 1971)	Dhaka	Metropolitan Dhaka	-	1974	2002	2018
Most Revd. Michael S. Baroi	-	Bangladesh	Dhaka	Metropolitan Dhaka	-	1990	2008	2025
Most Revd. Paul Sarker	-	Bangladesh	Dhaka	Metropolitan Dhaka	-	2002	2018	-
Most Revd. Samuel Sunil Mankhin	-	Bangladesh	Dhaka	Metropolitan Dhaka	-	2002	-	-
Right Revd. Shourabh Pholia	-	Bangladesh	under see of Dhaka	Barisal	-	2017	-	-
Right Revd. Hemen Halder	-	Bangladesh	under see of Dhaka	Kushtia	-	2019	-	-

== Book of Common Prayer ==
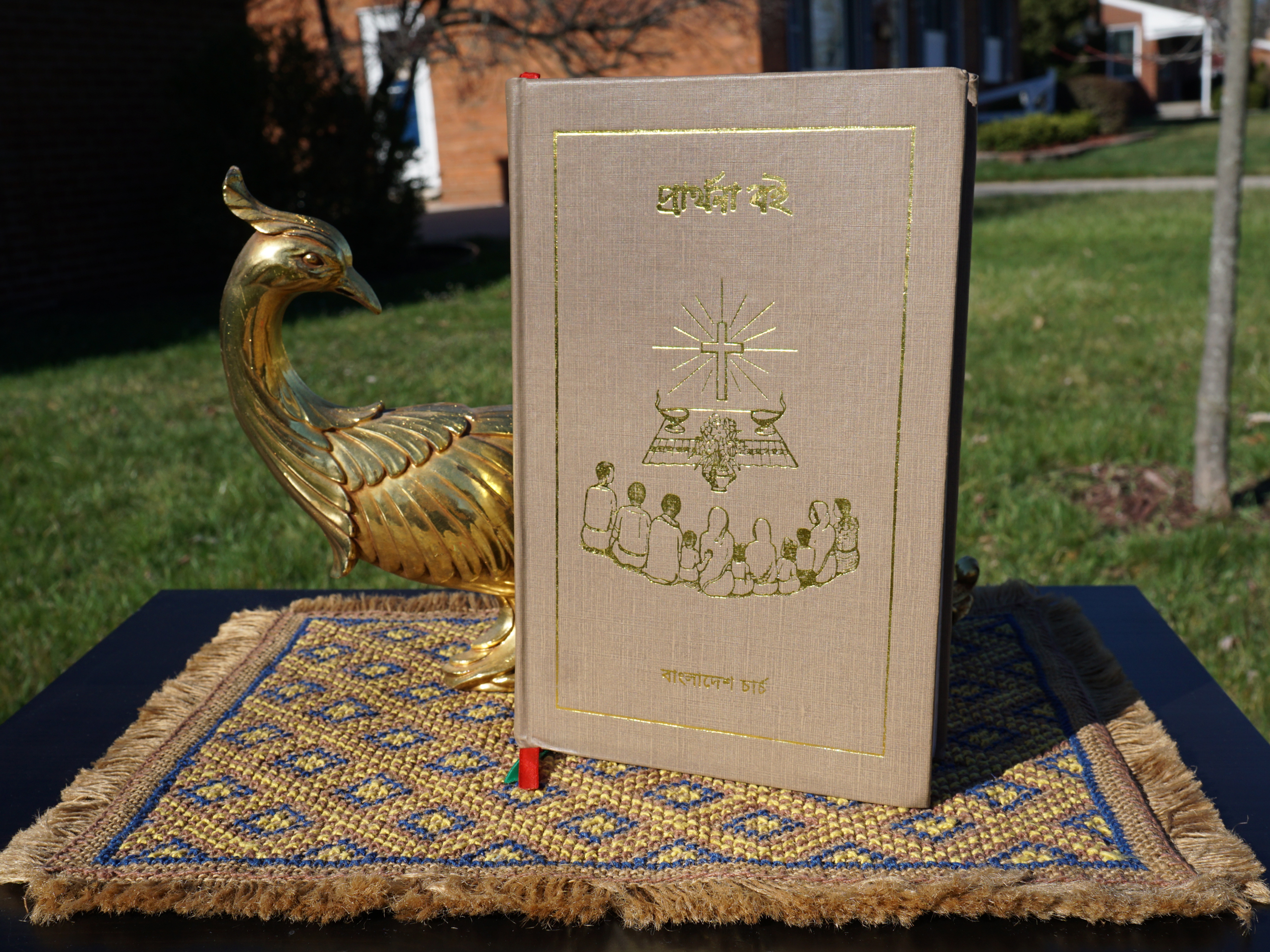
The Church of Bangladesh Book of Common Prayer approved in 1997

The Book of Common Prayer produced by the Church of Bangladesh, translated literally as "prayer book" (Bengali: প্রার্থনা বই) was approved by synod in 1997. The book contains prayers translated from the traditional Book of Common Prayer as well as those from the Church of North India and the CWM's Prayer Letter, along with original compositions by the Church of Bangladesh.

== Dioceses ==
There are three dioceses in the Church of Bangladesh:

=== Diocese of Dhaka ===
Erected in 1956 by dividing the Diocese of Calcutta, the diocese (originally called "East Bengal") covered all East Pakistan. It was in the Church of India, Pakistan, Burma and Ceylon until the 1970 union of the Church of Pakistan. It became the sole diocese of the Church of Bangladesh upon the church's 30 April 1974 independence. Since it was split to create Kushtia diocese, the Moderator of the Synod has usually also been Archbishop of Dhaka of Church of Bangladesh.

- 1956–1975: James D. Blair (assistant bishop of Calcutta (for East Bengal), 1951–1956)
- 1975–2003: Barnabas Dejen Mondal (consecrated 16 February 1975, Oxford Mission Church)
- 2003–2009: Michael S. Baroi (installed 24 January 2003)
- 2009 – 18 February 2019 (ret.): Paul Shishir Sarker (Moderator 2009 – 19 November 2018)
- 2019–present: Samuel Sunil Mankhin (Moderator 2018 – present)

=== Diocese of Kushtia ===
Founded from Dhaka diocese in 1990; the Bishop in Kushtia was ex officio deputy moderator until 2018, when the new bishop in Barisal became deputy moderator (as the second most senior bishop by consecration).

- Michael S. Baroi (consecrated 30 November 1990, St Peter's Ratanpur)
- Paul Shishir Sarkar (consecrated 5 January 2003, Oxford Mission Church)
- ?–2019: Samuel Sunil Mankhin (consecrated 8 November 2009, St Mary's Haluaghat; Moderator since 19 November 2018)
- 2019–present: Hemen Halder (consecrated 27 January 2019)

=== Diocese of Barisal ===
Formed in 2017 from Dhaka diocese.

- 2017–present: Shourabh Pholia (elected 24 February; consecrated 30 April, at Christ the King Khalishpur; installed 18 June; Deputy Moderator since 19 November 2018)

== Anglican realignment ==
The Church of Bangladesh is a member of the Global South. Former Moderator Paul Sarker attended an Anglican Church in North America meeting on 13–15 May 2017, at Holy Cross Cathedral, in Loganville, Georgia. He and Archbishop Foley Beach, of the ACNA, signed "A Joint Statement on Communion from the Primate of Bangladesh and the Primate of the Anglican Church", to affirm and celebrate the communion between both churches. It was also discussed how both provinces could work together with mission partnerships. The Church of Bangladesh was the first united province of the Anglican Communion to declare full communion with the ACNA.

The Church of Bangladesh was not represented at GAFCON III, on 17–22 June 2018, because it took place in Jerusalem, but Samuel Sunil Mankhin attended G19, the additional conference that took place in Dubai, on 25 February – 1 March 2019.
