= Church of Pakistan =

United Protestant Church in Pakistan

- Logo
- Classification: Protestant
- Orientation: United Protestant
- Polity: Mixed polity with episcopal and presbyterian elements
- Moderator: Azad Marshall
- Associations: World Methodist Council, Anglican Communion, World Communion of Reformed Churches, Christian Conference of Asia; World Council of Churches
- Origin: 1970; 56 years ago Pakistan
- Merger of: Anglican (Church of India, Burma and Ceylon), Presbyterian (Church of Scotland), Lutheran, Methodist
- Separations: Church of Bangladesh (1974)
- Members: 1,900,000
- Ministers: 600
- Official website: www.cop.org.pk

The Church of Pakistan is a united Protestant church in Pakistan founded in 1970; it holds membership in the Anglican Communion, the World Communion of Reformed Churches, and the World Methodist Council. The Church of Pakistan claims 1,900,000 members.

== History ==
The Church of Pakistan was established in 1970 as a union of members of the Anglican (Church of India, Pakistan, Burma and Ceylon), Presbyterian (Church of Scotland), United Methodist, and Lutheran churches. It is the only united Protestant church in South Asia which involves Lutherans.

The church has two theological seminaries: the Gujranwala Theological Seminary and St. Thomas' Theological College, Karachi.

== Ordination of Women ==
The Church of Pakistan ordained the first women as deacons in 2001. The church does not ordain women as priests or bishops.

== List of dioceses ==
- Faisalabad (Bishop: Aleem Anwar Gill)
- Hyderabad (Bishop: Kaleem John)
- Karachi (Bishop: Frederick John)
- Lahore (Bishop: Nadeem Kamran)
- Multan (Bishop: Leo Roderick Paul)
- Peshawar (Bishop: Humphrey Peters)
- Raiwind (Bishop: Azad Marshall)
- Sialkot (Bishop: Alwin John Samuel)

The Diocese of Sialkot is a member of the World Communion of Reformed Churches. Today, the whole Church of Pakistan is listed as a member on the WCRC website. The Sialkot diocese has more than 40,400 members in 44 congregations and 28 house fellowships. It adheres to the Apostles Creed, Heidelberg Catechism, Westminster Shorter Catechism and Nicene Creed.

Moderators of the Synod have included Zahir-Ud-Din Mirza, first Bishop of Faisalabad (1990–?). Immediately after the 1970 union, the church had four dioceses: Multan, Lahore, Sialkot; in 1980, four more were created: Hyderabad, Raiwind, Faisalabad, Peshawar. In 2013, there were eight diocesan bishops plus an area bishop for the Gulf ministries (especially among Urdu-speakers) — an appointment in cooperation with the Diocese of Cyprus and the Gulf, and the Episcopal Church in Jerusalem and the Middle East

== Diocese of Raiwind ==
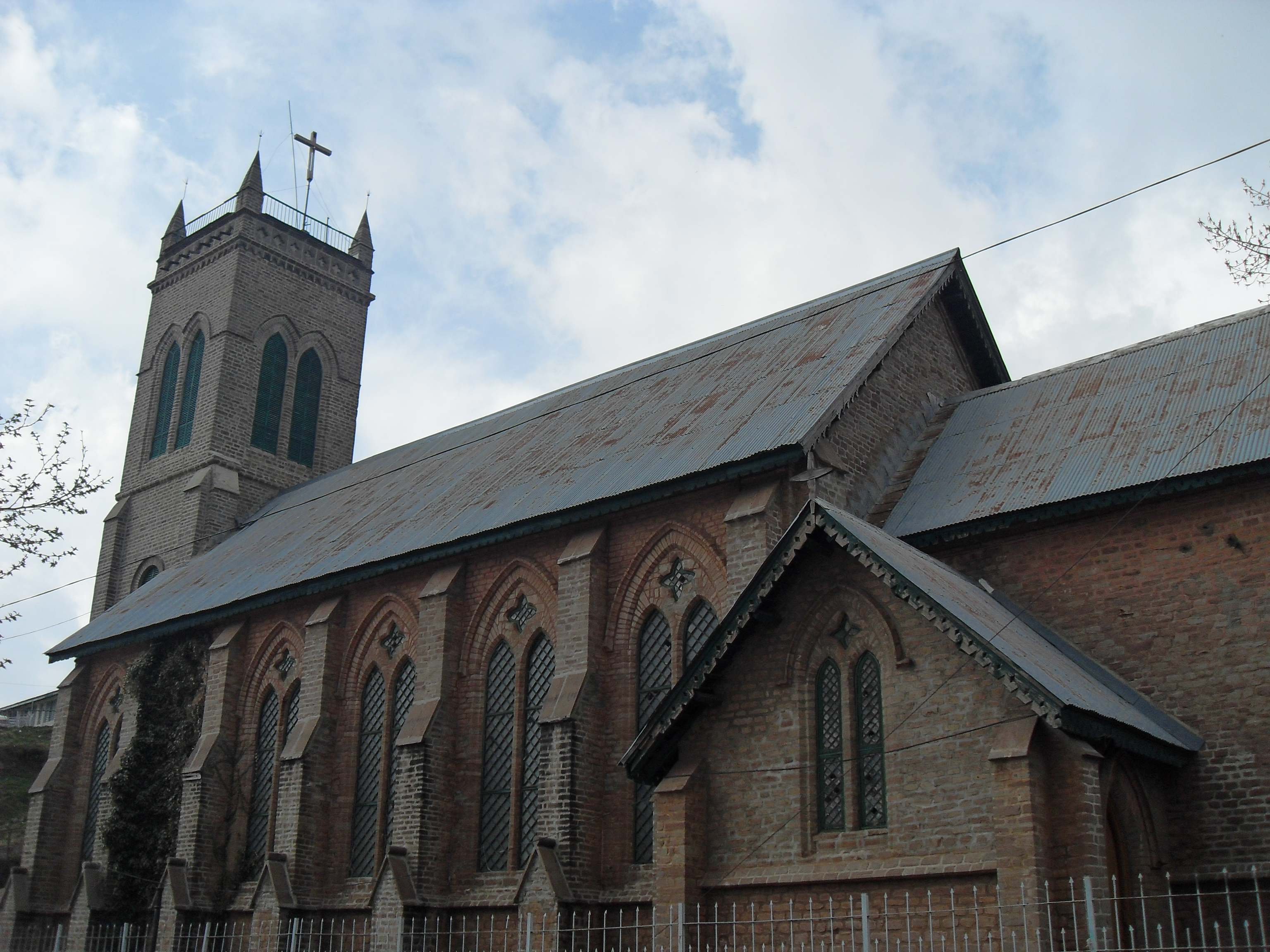
The church in Murree

The Diocese of Raiwind is one of the eight dioceses of the Church of Pakistan and came into being in 1980, 10 years after the church union in which Anglicans, Presbyterians, Lutherans and Methodists merged to form the Church of Pakistan. The diocese in its episcopal jurisdiction comprises the former United Methodist Mission areas and is predominantly rural and semi-urban. The central diocesan office is in Lahore. The diocesan area stretches from Warris Road, almost 65 miles south of Lahore. The diocese has more than 26,000 members in 38 congregations, 6 departments and 11 schools. The main ministries of the diocese are pastoral care, village schools, Sunday schools, peace building, hostel for poor children, youth empowerment, women's empowerment and special education.

== Relations with the Anglican realignment ==
The Church of Pakistan is a member of the Global South (Anglican) but not of the Global Anglican Future Conference (GAFCON), despite some bishops expressing their support. The moderator and primate, Humphrey Peters, before being elected, attended the Anglican Church in North America meeting of the college of bishops, in Orlando, Florida, from 6 to 10 January 2014. Bishop Azad Marshall of Raiwind is the leading person for GAFCON in the province and he attended G19, the additional conference for those who were not able to attend GAFCON III the previous year, held in Dubai, from 25 February to 1 March 2019.

Archbishop Foley Beach, of the Anglican Church in North America, visited Pakistan in November 2019, where he met Moderator Humphrey Peters and Bishop Azad Marshall of the Church of Pakistan. He also met Muslim scholars during his visit. Marshall was elected moderator bishop of the Church of Pakistan in 2021, bringing his province closer to the Anglican realignment.

== See also ==
- Christianity in Pakistan
- Christianity in India
- Ancient Christianity in the Indian Subcontinent
- Constitution of the Church of Pakistan
