= Azad Marshall =

Pakistani bishop

The Right Reverend Azad Marshall
- Bishop of Raiwind
- Church: Church of Pakistan
- Diocese: Diocese of Raiwind
- Installed: 2017

Orders
- Ordination: 1988
- Consecration: 1994

Personal details
- Denomination: Protestant (Anglican in a united church)
- Education: University of the Punjab

Azad Marshall is a Pakistani bishop, currently serving, since May 2021, as the moderator bishop of the Church of Pakistan, a United Protestant denomination that is a member of the World Communion of Reformed Churches, the Anglican Communion, and the World Methodist Council. In the past, he was the sixth Bishop of the Anglican Church in the Islamic Republic of Iran, a diocese of the Episcopal Church in Jerusalem and the Middle East in the Anglican Communion, since 2007.

Marshall was educated at the University of the Punjab, in Pakistan, from which he received the degree of Bachelor of Arts. He also studied at Ramsey House Theological College in Cambridge, England. He holds the Master of Divinity Degree from Gujranwala Theological Seminary in Pakistan and a Master of Theology degree from the London School of Theology.

Beginning in 1976, Marshall served with the "Send the Light Trust" in Iran and then served on two ships as part of their International team for promoting "Good books" and providing humanitarian aid around the world.

In 1980, he founded Church Foundation Seminars, a church-related teaching and training ministry to strengthen pastors and leaders. in 1985, he founded the Institute for Basic Adult Development and Training, a literacy and vocational training program. At present it operates 250 Centers to bring about more than 100,000 students. Azad also founded the Prince of Peace Library and Center to bring about reconciliation among the Christian and Muslim communities of Shanti Nagar, Pakistan, and to promote peace.

Ordained as a deacon in 1987 and a presbyter in 1988, in the Church of Pakistan, Marshall served as the vicar of St. Andrew's Church, Lahore. In 1994 he was consecrated bishop by the Church of Pakistan to serve the Urdu-speaking congregations in the Gulf States. The following year he was made an associate bishop in the Province of the Middle East.

In 2003, Marshall was appointed vicar general in the Province of Jerusalem and the Middle East to have episcopal oversight of the church in Iran. In 2007, he was installed as sixth bishop in Iran and, in 2009, he was also made assistant bishop in the Diocese of Cyprus and the Gulf for Urdu-speaking congregations. That same year he was elected as a member of the standing committee of the Anglican Consultative Council and also president of the National Council of Churches in Pakistan.

Nashotah House conferred on Marshall the degree of Doctor of Divinity (honoris causa).

On 8 January 2016, Marshall was elected coadjutor bishop of the Raiwind diocese in the Church of Pakistan. He was enthroned as Bishop of Raiwind on 20 August 2017.

He is a supporter of the Anglican realignment and addressed the meeting of the college of bishops of the Anglican Church in North America held in Orlando, Florida, in January 2013. He attended G19, the additional conference for those who were not able to attend GAFCON III the previous year, held in Dubai, from 25 February to 1 March 2019.

At the 16th Triennial Meeting of the Church of Pakistan Synod, held on 14 May 2021, Marshall was elected as the moderator bishop, a position in some united Protestant churches held by a bishop who oversees a denomination.

== Works ==
Marshall's publications include Onward and Upward (1990), a Confirmation preparation course; Churches of the Middle East (1993); Letters to the Seven Churches in Revelation (1994), and Lent and Us (1994), and he edited Building Bridges, a compilation of speeches given by Lord Robert Runcie, then Archbishop of Canterbury, on his visit to Pakistan.

== Personal life ==
Marshall is married to Lesley, who directs a ministry to underprivileged women in Pakistan. They have two children.
