= Franciscans (disambiguation) =

Franciscans are members of the Order of Friars Minor, a Catholic religious order founded in 1209 by Francis of Assisi.

Franciscans may also refer to:

== Catholic religious orders ==
- Order of Friars Minor, founded in 1209 by St Francis of Assisi
- Order of Saint Clare, founded in 1212 by St Clare and St Francis of Assisi
- Secular Franciscan Order, founded in 1221 by St Francis of Assisi
- Order of Friars Minor Conventual founded in 1517 by secession from Order of Friars Minor
- Order of Friars Minor Capuchin founded in 1520 by secession from Order of Friars Minor

== Non-Catholic organisations ==
=== Anglicanism ===
- Society of St Francis, founded in 1934
  - Community of St. Francis, founded in 1905
  - Community of St. Clare, founded in 1950
  - Little Brothers of Francis, founded in 1987

=== Lutheranism ===
- Order of Lutheran Franciscans, founded after 1927

=== Ecumenical ===
- Order of Ecumenical Franciscans, founded in 1983
