= 1848 in the United Kingdom =

Events from the year 1848 in the United Kingdom.

== Incumbents ==
- Monarch – Victoria
- Prime Minister – Lord John Russell (Whig)
- Foreign Secretary – Henry John Temple, 3rd Viscount Palmerston

== Events ==
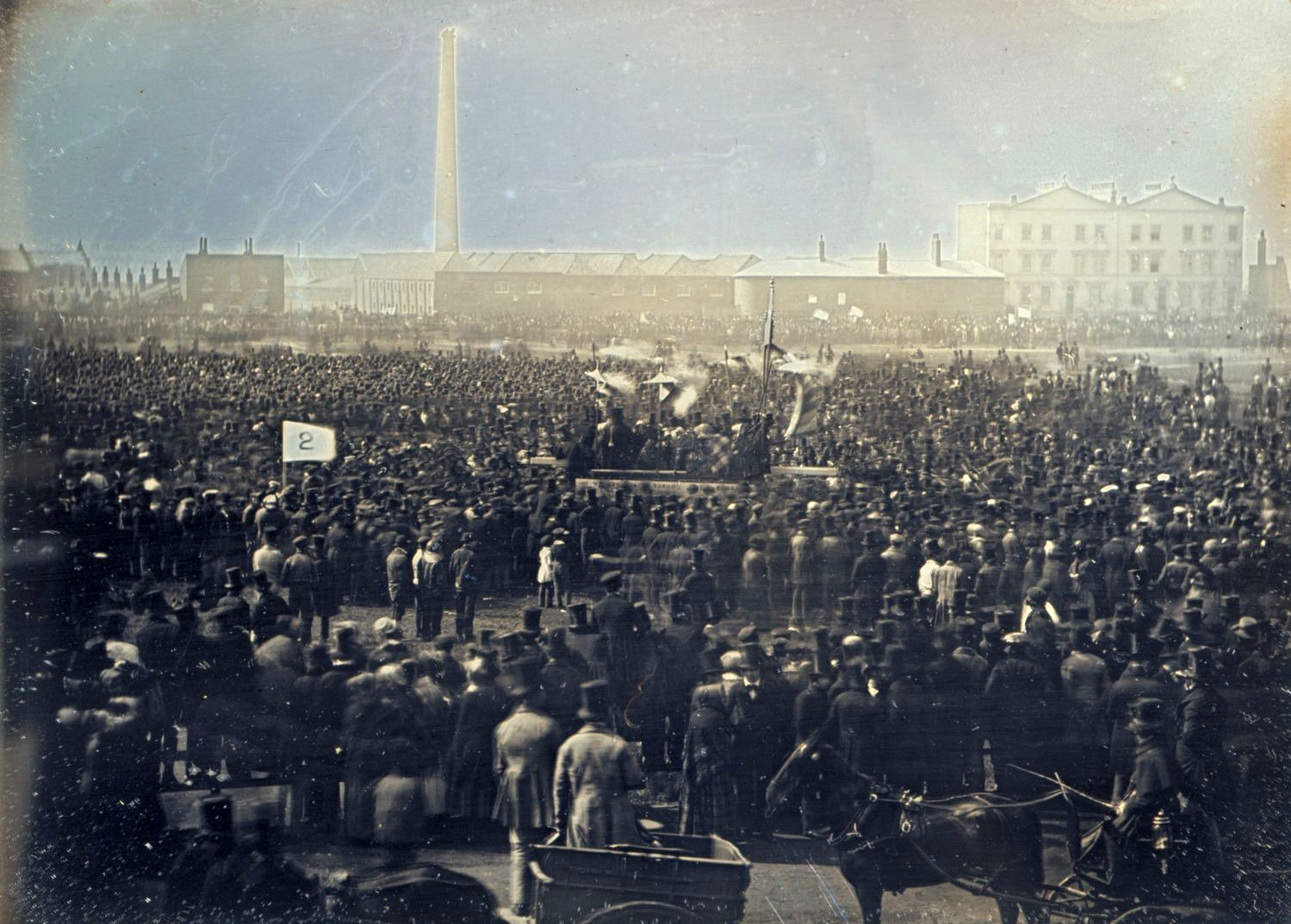
10 April: The first photograph of a crowd shows the Chartist Rally.

- 2 February – John Henry Newman founds the first Oratory in the English-speaking world when he establishes the Birmingham Oratory at 'Maryvale', Old Oscott.
- 15 February – The Caledonian Railway is opened throughout between Edinburgh, Carstairs and Carlisle, completing a through rail route from London by the West Coast Main Line and providing the first service of through carriages between Scotland and England.
- 17 February – John Bird Sumner is nominated archbishop of Canterbury.
- 24 February – Amid a revolt, French King Louis-Philippe abdicates and escapes to England.
- 29 March – Queen's College, London, founded, the world's first school to award academic qualifications to young women.
- 8 April – Queen Victoria leaves London for the Isle of Wight under threat of civil unrest.
- 10 April – A 'Monster' Chartist rally is held in Kennington Park, London, headed by Feargus O'Connor. A petition demanding the franchise is presented to Parliament.
- 18 April – Second Anglo-Sikh War breaks out in the Punjab.
- 21 April–23 November – Chopin visits London and Scotland, his last public appearance on a concert platform being on 16 November at the Guildhall, London.
- 22 April – Treason Felony Act passed, reducing certain categories of capital high treason to felony punishable by penal transportation.
- May – Huddersfield workhouse scandal: an inquiry reveals the poor conditions in which inmates have been kept.
- 30 May – The Prudential Mutual Assurance Investment and Loan Association is established at Hatton Garden in London to provide loans to professional and working people.
- July – Great Famine (Ireland): Potato blight has returned and outbreaks of cholera are reported. Famine victims on outdoor relief peak this month at almost 840,000 people.
- 4 July – St George's Cathedral, Southwark, is opened as a Roman Catholic church, designed by Augustus Pugin.
- 11 July – London Waterloo station opens.
- 26 July – Matale Rebellion against British rule in Sri Lanka.
- 29 July – Young Irelander Rebellion at Ballingarry, South Tipperary, is broken up by the Irish Constabulary.
- 24 August – The U.S. barque Ocean Monarch is burnt out off the Great Orme, North Wales, with the loss of 178, chiefly emigrants.
- 26 August – The Plymouth Brethren split into the Exclusive and Open Brethren.
- 31 August – The Public Health Act receives Royal Assent, establishing Boards of Health across England and Wales and paving the way for considerable improvements in public sanitation to counter endemic cholera in British cities. This year the third cholera pandemic reaches the UK.
- 16 September – William Lassell independently co-discovers Hyperion, one of the moons of Saturn.
- 1 November – First W H Smith bookstall at a railway station opens, at Euston Station, in London.
- 21 November – First convicts arrive at HM Prison Portland, the first in which inmates are required to serve on public works (in this case, quarrying stone for Portland Harbour breakwaters).
- 22 November – Battle of Ramnagar: Lord Gough makes some strategic blunders and British cavalry are repulsed with heavy losses, resulting in a Sikh victory.
- 28 November – Murders at Stanfield Hall: Norfolk tenant farmer James Rush shoots and kills his landlord and his landlord's son in an elaborate attempt to avoid eviction.
- 23 December – A picture of the royal family gathered around a Christmas tree at Windsor Castle appears on the cover of The Illustrated London News (special Christmas supplement), popularising the custom of the tree in Britain.

=== Undated ===
- New Anglican sisterhoods founded: Society of the Most Holy Trinity (the 'Devonport Sisters' or Ascot Priory) is established by Lydia Sellon to minister to the poor in the seafaring community of Devonport and the Community of St Mary the Virgin is founded at Wantage.
- Cambridge rules for Association football drawn up.
- British, Dutch and German governments lay claim to New Guinea.

== Publications ==
- The Communist Manifesto (Manifest der Kommunistischen Partei) by Friedrich Engels and Karl Marx (21 February).
- W. Harrison Ainsworth's novel The Lancashire Witches (serialised in The Sunday Times).
- Mrs Cecil Frances Alexander's Hymns for Little Children, including "All Things Bright and Beautiful" and "Once in Royal David's City".
- Anne Brontë's novel The Tenant of Wildfell Hall (as "by Acton Bell").
- Edward Bulwer-Lytton's epic fantasy poem King Arthur (1848–9).
- Charles Dickens' Christmas novella The Haunted Man and the Ghost's Bargain.
- Elizabeth Gaskell's first novel Mary Barton (anonymous).
- Thomas Babington Macaulay's work The History of England from the Accession of James the Second, vol. 1–2.
- John Stuart Mill's book Principles of Political Economy.
- John Henry Newman's novel Loss and Gain: the story of a convert.
- William Makepeace Thackeray's novel Pendennis (serialised).

== Births ==
- 27 February – Hubert Parry, composer (died 1918)
- 3 March – Adelaide Neilson, actress (died 1880)
- 10 March – John William Brodie-Innes, member of the Golden Dawn (died 1923)
- 18 March – Princess Louise, Duchess of Argyll (died 1939)
- 31 March – William Waldorf Astor, 1st Viscount Astor, financier and statesman (died 1919)
- 7 April – Randall Thomas Davidson, Scottish-born Archbishop of Canterbury (died 1930)
- 18 July – W. G. Grace, cricketer (died 1915)
- 25 July
  - George Robert Aberigh-Mackay, Anglo-Indian writer (died 1881)
  - Arthur Balfour, Prime Minister of the United Kingdom (died 1930)
- 4 October – Frederic Weatherly, lyricist (died 1929)
- 11 October – James Acton, cricketer (died 1924)
- 15 November – Edwin Bibby, wrestler (died 1905)
- 2 December – Mary Slessor, missionary (died 1915)

== Deaths ==
- 19 January – Isaac D'Israeli, author (born 1766)
- 11 February – William Howley, archbishop of Canterbury (born 1766)
- 11 May – Tom Cribb, bare-knuckle boxer (born 1781)
- 27 May – Princess Sophia, fifth daughter of King George III (born 1777)
- 3 August – Edward Baines, newspaperman and politician (born 1774)
- 9 August – Frederick Marryat, author (born 1792)
- 12 August – George Stephenson, locomotive pioneer (born 1781)
- 23 November – Sir John Barrow, 1st Baronet, statesman (born 1764)
- 24 November – William Lamb, 2nd Viscount Melbourne, Prime Minister of the United Kingdom (born 1779)
- 19 December – Emily Brontë, author (born 1818)
