= Franciscan spirituality in Protestantism =

Influence of the spirituality of Catholic saint Francis in Protestant Christians

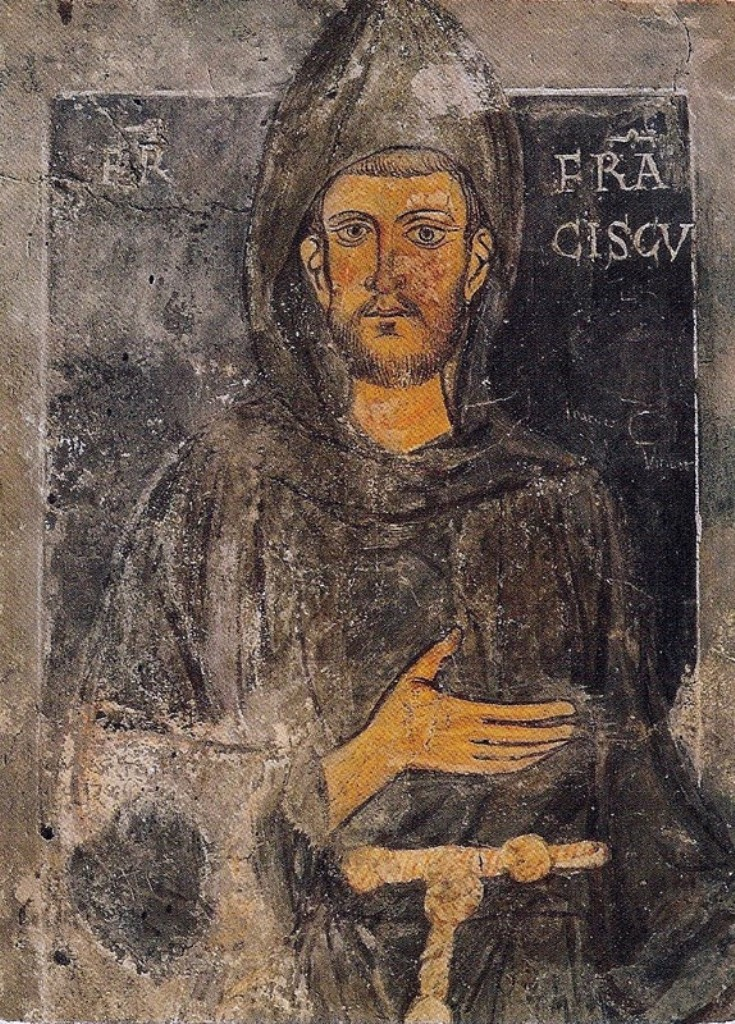
Saint Francis of Assisi, founder of the Order of Friars Minor of the Catholic Church.

Emerging since the 19th century, there are several Protestant adherent and groups, sometimes organised as religious orders, which strive to adhere to the teachings and spiritual disciplines of Saint Francis of Assisi. The 20th century High Church Movement gave birth to Franciscan inspired orders among revival of religious orders in Protestant Christianity.

There are Franciscan orders in Lutheran churches, including the Order of Lutheran Franciscans, the Evangelical Sisterhood of Mary, and the Evangelische Kanaan Franziskus-Bruderschaft (Kanaan Franciscan Brothers). One of the results of the Oxford Movement in the Anglican Church during the 19th century was the re-establishment of religious orders, including some of Franciscan inspiration. The principal Anglican communities in the Franciscan tradition are the Community of St. Francis (women, founded 1905), the Poor Clares of Reparation (P.C.R.), the Society of Saint Francis (men, founded 1934), and the Community of St. Clare (women, enclosed). There is also a Third Order known as the Third Order Society of St Francis (T.S.S.F.). There are three other U.S.-founded orders within the Anglican Communion – the Seattle-founded Second Order of The Little Sisters of St. Clare (LSSC) in the Diocese of Olympia, the dispersed First Order Order of Saint Francis (OSF) founded in 2003, and the Community of Francis and Clare (CFC) which is a dispersed, open, inclusive, and contemporary expression of Anglican/Episcopal Franciscan life open to men and women.

Both the Lutheran churches and the Anglican churches have third orders parallel to Catholic ones. Lutherans have an Order of Lutheran Franciscans, and the Anglicans have a Third Order of the Society of Saint Francis (TSSF), with the same name as the Catholic third order, the Third Order of Saint Francis.

There are also Franciscan communities within the Reformed churches and the Old Catholic Church - for example, the OSFC. In addition, there are associations of Franciscan inspiration that are ecumenical - accepting Christians of all denominations, the Order of Ecumenical Franciscans being an example.

== Lutheran churches ==
In the Evangelical Church in Germany, apart from the high church movement, there exists a Protestant Evangelische Kanaan Franziskus-Bruderschaft (Kanaan Franciscan Brothers), affiliated with Evangelical Sisterhood of Mary.

In Church of Sweden, there is Helige Franciskus Systraskap (Sisterhood of Saint Francis), a religious community in Klaradal convent in Sjövik.

In the Lutheran Church, there has been also more general interest to Franciscan spirituality. E.g. "Assisi-Kredsen" in Denmark and "Franciskus-Sällskapet i Finland" are ecumenical societies, which e.g. arrange journeys to Assisi and in Franciscan convents. Members are mostly Lutherans.

=== Lutheran third orders ===
The Order of Lutheran Franciscans, founded in 2011, is a dispersed, "undifferentiated" Order in the tradition of the other Franciscan orders. Life-professed women and men, lay or ordained, make Vows of Poverty, Chastity and Obedience.

Established in 2006, the Order of St. Francis-Lutheran (OSF-L) operates under the auspices of the Lutheran Church-International. The Order is based in St. Catharines, Ontario, Canada.

In the United States, the Evangelical Society of the Cross Franciscan (the Lutheran Third Order of St. Francis) was founded in 1988 in Orlando, Florida. It was blessed by Bishop Lavern Franzen of the Evangelical Lutheran Church in America.

In Europe, there are nine Franciscan third orders, two of which are commonly referenced.

Evangelische Franziskaner-Tertiaren (Lutheran Franciscan Tertiaries, officially "Evangelische Franziskanerbruderschaft der Nachfolge Christi") was founded in Germany 1927 within Hochkirchliche Vereinigung.

Franciskus Tredje Orden, FTO in Church of Sweden, is part of the European Province of the Third Order of the Anglican Society of St Francis. Stockholm based pastor Ted Harris is a well established member and contact man for Franciskus Tredje Orden.

== Anglican Communion ==
One of the results of the Oxford Movement in the Anglican Church during the 19th century was the re-establishment of religious orders, including some of Franciscan inspiration. The principal Anglican communities in the Franciscan tradition are the Community of St. Francis (women, founded 1905), the Poor Clares of Reparation (P.C.R.), the Society of Saint Francis (men, founded 1934), and the Community of St. Clare (women, enclosed). There is also a Third Order known as the Third Order Society of St Francis (T.S.S.F.).

A U.S.-founded order within the Anglican world communion is the Seattle-founded order of Clares in Seattle (Diocese of Olympia) The Little Sisters of St. Clare.

The Order of St. Francis (OSF) is a community of brothers that was founded in 2003 originally within the Diocese of Olympia and is recognized within the United States and Canada.

The Community of Francis and Clare (CFC) is a dispersed, open, inclusive, and contemporary expression of Anglican/Episcopal Franciscan life open to men and women.

Another officially sanctioned Anglican order with a more contemplative focus is the order of the Little Brothers of Francis in the Anglican Church of Australia.

The Company of Jesus Community, of both Franciscan and Benedictine inspiration, is under the episcopal oversight of a bishop of the Episcopal Church (United States), but accepts any baptized Christians as members.

=== Society of St Francis ===
The main manifestation of the Franciscan life within the Anglican Communion is the Society of St Francis. It is fully recognised as part of the Anglican Communion and has around 3,000 members in its constituent orders. The society is made up of several distinct orders: the brothers of the First Order (Society of St Francis, SSF); the sisters of the First Order (Community of St Francis, CSF); the sisters of the Second Order (Community of St Clare, OSC); and the brothers and sisters of the Third Order (Third Order of St Francis, TSSF). There are also Third Order members.

==== First Order ====
First Order Franciscans live in community under traditional vows of poverty, chastity and obedience. In the Anglican Communion the male first order is known as the Society of St Francis, and brothers have the initials 'SSF' after their name; the female first order is known as the Community of St Francis, and sisters have the initials 'CSF' after their name. The First Order brothers and sisters operate worldwide, dividing themselves into internal provinces, and have around 200 members.

==== Second Order ====
Second Order Franciscans live in enclosed community, taking the same traditional vows but following a version of the Rule of St Francis modified to reflect a more contemplative lifestyle. Second Order sisters are often known as "Poor Clares", though they should properly be known as the Order of St Clare or the Community of St Clare. The sisters have the initials "OSC" after their names. They are the smallest part of the Franciscan family and are currently active only in the United Kingdom at St Mary's Convent, Freeland, Oxfordshire. The sisters believe that their "enclosed" life does not mean being "shut in", but rather an opportunity to live and work together on one site in real community. The former second order convent in New York, opened in 1922, closed in 2003 following the death of the last sister of the Poor Clares of Reparation and Adoration (OSC).

==== Third Order ====
A Third Order of Saint Francis (TSSF), with the same name as the Catholic third order, exists in the Anglican Communion. This runs alongside the Anglican Society of St Francis and Community of St Francis (First Order Franciscans), and the Community of St. Clare (Anglican Second Order of Franciscan Sisters).

Third Order Franciscans live as a dispersed community, which means that they meet together regularly for prayer, study, and fellowship, but live individually on a day-to-day basis. Some live alone, others as part of a family. Members must be aged over 18, and may be single or married, ordained or lay, and male or female. They do not take the traditional three-fold vow of poverty, chastity, and obedience, but they do enter into a binding promise and live by a rule of life based upon Francis of Assisi's original Third Order rule.

The Society of St. Francis includes an order of tertiaries, people who have taken promises and are followers of a version of the Franciscan Rule but do not live together in community. This Third Order Society of Saint Francis (T.S.S.F.) was founded in 1950. The T.S.S.F. consists of men and women, lay and ordained, married and single. It is divided into five provinces: Africa, Australia, New Zealand, Europe, and the Americas.

The Franciscan Order of the Divine Mercy (FODM), based in the United States of America, aim to live in harmony within the Anglican Church of the Americas and invites other Christian faiths to follow an Ecumenical Christian path. They are a Third Order society of men and women who live out of community. Currently this Order has members in the United States of America, Canada and Ireland.

==== Companions ====
The Companions of the Society of St Francis (CompSSF) are individual men and women, lay and ordained, married and single, who wish to follow the spirituality of Francis of Assisi together with the Sisters and Brothers of the Society but without taking formal vows. Companions pray for the Society each day and support its work through giving alms. In some areas, they also meet together for fellowship, prayer and mutual support.

=== Other Franciscan orders ===
Whilst the Society of St Francis (First, Second and Third Orders), operating worldwide, is widely recognized as the principal branch of Franciscanism within the Anglican Communion, there are other religious orders following the Franciscan rule, and living the Franciscan life. Those that are officially recognized as part of the Anglican Communion include the following:

==== First Order ====
- The Korean Franciscan Brotherhood (KFB) is a First Order male community in formation in Korea, with assistance from the Society of St Francis. An SSF brother has headed the KFB since its formation in 1994, and by an agreement reached in 2001 will continue to support KFB in achieving full independence as an order. The brothers are building friaries and a retreat centre.
- The Sisters of St Francis (SSF) is a Korean community of First Order sisters living in a convent at Cheongwon County, Korea. The sisters engage in community work and parish work within the Anglican Church of Korea.
- The Society of the Franciscan Servants of Jesus and Mary (FSJM) is a community of women founded in 1935, and living in a convent at Posbury in Devon. The sisters accept guests for retreats and also have a small retreat cottage which is sometimes available for guests. The community is small in number, and has ceased much of its active community work.
- The Daughters of St Francis is a community of women following the Franciscan rule in Korea.
- The Order of St Elizabeth of Hungary was an early experiment in Franciscan First Order life for women, founded during the First World War and named after the Franciscan divine Elizabeth of Thuringia. Operating extensively in England and Australia, the society declined rapidly in the 1980s and closed in the 1990s.
- The Order of Saint Francis (OSF) is an active, Apostolic Christian religious First Order within the Franciscan tradition. The OSF admits members of the Anglican Communion (and churches in full communion). Rather than living in an enclosed communal setting, OSF brothers live independently in different parts of the world, with ministries based on the needs of their local communities. Members are baptized men who have been confirmed within the Anglican Communion, and who voluntarily commit to living by a set of vows for a term of years or for life. The OSF is a dispersed order, which welcomes men with dual vocations (clergy as well as lay). Brothers may also be married or single and can be found in the United States, Canada, and Africa.

==== Second Order and hermitage ====
- The Little Brothers of Francis (LBF) is a small Australian community of men, whose three founders were First Order brothers (SSF) who felt called to a more individual and contemplative life. They live according to the Rule of St Francis for Hermitages, and thus bring a further dimension to the Franciscan family within Anglicanism.
- The Little Sisters of Saint Clare (LSSC) is a fresh expression of the Second Order rule founded in 2002. The sisters wear traditional habit and follow the contemplative life, but they currently live as a dispersed community (though with regular Chapter meetings) pending the funds to establish a physical convent.
- The Society of Our Lady of the Isles (SOLI) is a contemplative community living on an island in Shetland (Scotland), according to a hybrid rule derived from a blending of the Franciscan Second Order rule and the Cistercian rule. Oblate sisters live enclosed within the community, whilst fully professed sisters live as solitary sisters, engaging with community activities at prescribed times.

==== Third Order ====
- The Company of Jesus is an unusual order in two respects. Firstly, it is a deliberate mix of the Franciscan and Benedictine rules, forming a "hybrid" community. Secondly, although it is a Third Order movement, it bears many of the characters of the First Order. The members spend large amounts of time in community in traditional habit and the order maintains a residential monastery (Livingstone Monastery in Virginia) where members may live the monastic life, despite their Third Order status.
- The Community of Francis and Clare (CFC) is a dispersed contemporary vowed religious community of women and men who live a common Rule and Life, prayer and service within the Episcopal Church (United States), its Communion Partners, and the worldwide Anglican Communion. The CFC seeks to follow Jesus in the footsteps of Francis and Clare by living simply and humbly, serving and praying with and for the marginalized members of the communities they live in, and by helping to re-build the Church in their contexts. As a contemporary expression of the Franciscan tradition, members – lay or clergy, partnered or single – live individually, in common, or with their families, and support themselves through secular or church-related employment. The members of the CFC vow poverty, chastity and obedience seeking to place these evangelical counsels into a contemporary expression (simplicity, fidelity, humility). They have diverse ministries in their communities, as the Spirit and the needs of the church lead them. Founded on All Saints Day, November 1, 2018, the community has members in the United States, Canada, and the United Kingdom.
- The Anglican Greyfriars (AG) is group of people, of all genders, sexualities, and ethnic backgrounds, who have chosen to live their Christian life in the way of St. Francis and St. Clare of Assisi as a contemporary expression of religious life. This Way of Life they hold together, but they express it most fully within their own contexts and situation of life. They are not a traditional religious order: rather, they are religious solitaries - drawn from the Church of England (including the Diocese in Europe), the Church in Wales, the Scottish Episcopal Church, and the Church of Ireland - who have chosen to journey together. Their first place of commitment is to their respective parishes. Whilst making common vows, they express these according to their local context and circumstance in consultation with their fellow Greyfriars. Founded on Saint David's Day 2023, the Anglican Greyfriars seek to meet physically twice a year: near the feast of Pentecost, and close to the Transitus of St Francis. They also meet weekly online to pray, and to share fellowship together. They may also choose to meet less formally for fellowship, pilgrimage and for training events as appropriate.

== Ecumenical organisations ==
In addition, there are associations of Franciscan inspiration not connected with a mainstream Christian tradition and describing themselves as ecumenical or dispersed.

The Free Episcopal Church in the USA sponsors the Order of Servant Franciscans, whose members are committed to "the process of becoming" ministers of Christ's message of reconciliation and love, as demonstrated by the holy lives of Saints Francis and Clare.

The Mission Episcopate of Saints Francis and Clare, "an autocephalous (self-governing) ecclesial jurisdiction", sponsors the Order of Lesser Sisters and Brothers, open to Christians male or female, married, partnered or single, clergy or lay. The Australian Ecumenical Franciscan Order is now an independent community in which most members live their everyday life in the world. They may be male or female, married, partnered or single, clergy or lay. They may belong to any Christian tradition. There is no discrimination of any sort, save as to minimum age.

The Companions of Jesus, founded in the United Kingdom in 2004, is "a Franciscan Community of Reconciliation".

The United States Order of Ecumenical Franciscans adopted its Rule on 22 November 1983. The Order of Lesser Sisters and Brothers is a dispersed ecumenical Franciscan community similar to the older Third Order model under which most members live their everyday life in the world. They may be male or female, married, partnered or single, clergy or lay. There is no discrimination of any sort, save as to minimum age.

The Ecumenical Franciscan Society from Eastern Europe has Lutheran, Catholic, Orthodox, Anglican and free Protestant members.

== See also ==
- Order of Friars Minor, the original Catholic mendicant order founded by Saint Francis of Assisi
- Oblate
- Bruderhof Communities
