= Edith Langridge =

British settlement worker and missionary

Mother Edith Langridge SE
- Born: 21 March 1864; Marylebone, England
- Died: 6 May 1959 (aged 95); Shillong, India
- Education: Queen's College in Harley Street and then Lady Margaret Hall
- Occupations: Missionary and nun

Edith Langridge (21 March 1864 – 6 May 1959), commonly known as Mother Edith (her name in religion), was a British settlement worker and missionary based at Barishal in British India (now Bangladesh), where she was a founder member and first superior of the Sisterhood of the Epiphany, a Benedictine Anglican religious order. She designed the Oxford Mission Church which is one of the largest churches in Asia.

== Birth and education ==
Langridge was born in Marylebone in London in 1864. Her parents were Flora Jane (née Pope) and Henry Langridge. She attended Queen's College in Harley Street where she excelled at Mathematics. However, when she applied to Lady Margaret Hall, Oxford, she was told she could not study maths, so she took a six-week crammer in Latin in order to study classics. She was awarded a scholarship and read classics from 1885. In 1888 she was awarded a second-class honours degree.

She worked as an assistant warden and warden for Lady Margaret Hall, but she wanted to be a missionary. She learnt Swahili so that she could work in Africa. However Bishop Talbot and Canon Charles Gore wanted her to lead a new "Sisterhood of the Epiphany" at Barishal in what is now Bangladesh. Barisal attracted Christian missionaries including the Oxford Mission which had formed the Brotherhood of the Epiphany in 1895.

== Sisterhood of the Epiphany ==
In 1902, the Sisterhood of the Epiphany (SE) was formed at Barisal under the guidance of Father Edmund Linwood Strong to mirror the Brotherhood. The work of the sisters was to include evangelism, medical work, and women's education under the leadership of Langridge. Later a branch house was formed at Jobarpar, Agailjhara thirty miles north of the town.

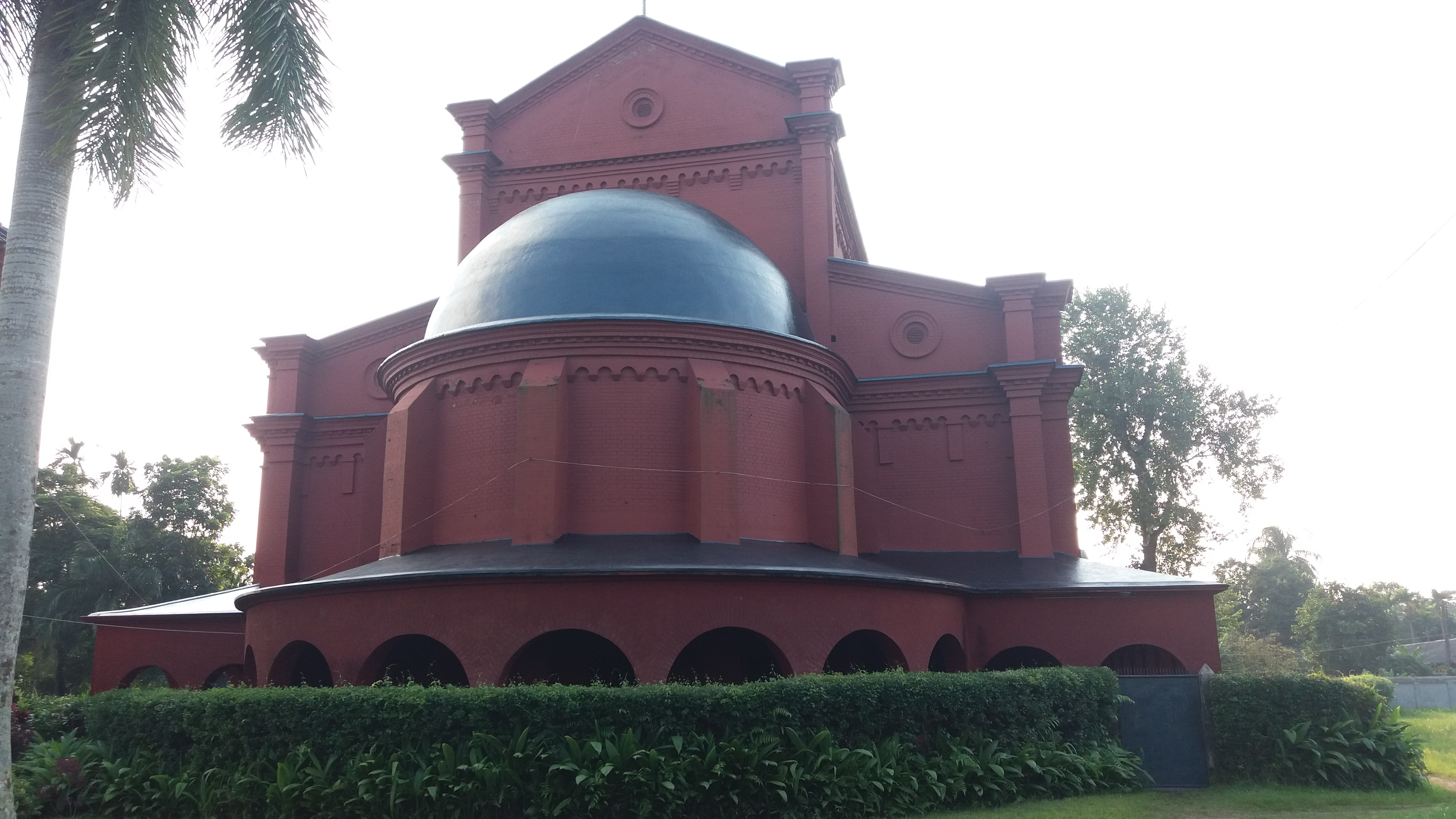
Oxford Mission Church in Barisal

The Oxford Mission Church, also known as the Epiphany Church, was established in 1903 based on a sketch by Sister Edith, and inaugurated on 26 January that year. Father Strong had overseen the completion of the church's design and construction through a second phase of building in 1907. The church was built on 35 acres of land surrounded by a high wall and rows of palm trees.

Langridge lead the sisterhood, formally adopting the style "Mother Edith" after she had taken her final vows in the order in 1913, and following an election to confirm her position as Mother Superior. In 1928 and 1931 she was challenged for the position, both elections ending in stalemate with an equal number of votes for both candidates. The Warden (a position held by a brother of the Brotherhood of the Epiphany) broke the deadlock on each occasion by confirming Langridge in her position.

There were several branch houses of the sisterhood, the largest at Calcutta where the sisters ran a primary school and an orphanage. In 1943 Mother Edith lost the election for Mother Superior and was replaced.

== Legacy ==
Langridge died in a hospital in Shillong in 1959.

In 1970 a parallel community to the Sisterhood of the Epiphany was founded for sisters of Bangladeshi nationality, named the Christa Sevika Sangha (CSS) (Handmaids of Christ), and in 1986 this order became independent. The foundress, Sr Susila SE, left the Sisterhood of the Epiphany to become the first Mother Superior CSS, an office she held until her death on 16 May 2011. At the same time another sister (Sr Leonore SE) transferred to the Community of St. Francis in order to follow the Franciscan Rule.

By the early 1990s only three SE sisters remained, and they left Bangladesh (where their work is continued by CSS) and returned to England, taking up residence at Ditchingham with the Community of All Hallows. The last three sisters died there, concluding the work of the Sisterhood of the Epiphany. However Sister Lucy Francis Holt was still a sister at the Oxford Mission Church in 2019 where she had taken Bangladeshi citizenship at the age of 89 so she could die there.
