= Former religious orders in the Anglican Communion =

Former religious orders in the churches of the Anglican Communion are those communities of monks, nuns, friars, or sisters, having a common life and rule under vows, whose work has ended and whose community has been disbanded. In a very few cases this is due to the termination of the work for which the community was established, but in most cases it is due to amalgamation or the death of the final remaining member of the community.

== Former communities for men ==
=== Brotherhood of the Epiphany (BE) ===
The Brotherhood of the Epiphany, also known as St. Paul's Brotherhood, was an Anglican religious order for men founded in 1879 by priests associated with the Oxford Mission. The order was originally based in Calcutta, and later expanded to include houses in other parts of northern India and present-day Bangladesh. With the closure of the Indian houses, jurisdiction was transferred from the Church of North India to the Church of Bangladesh. The final house of the order was at Bogra Road in Barisal, Bangladesh. It oversaw boarding schools, Christian youth hostels, a medical centre, an orphanage, and a primary school. The community was reported as active in 2003, but by 2011 was no longer listed on the Anglican Communion directory of religious communities. The Oxford Mission, an associated body, states on its website "The brotherhood has come to an end, but in India the work continues under an Administrator appointed by the Bishop of Kolkata, and in Bangladesh under the supervision of the Diocese of Dhaka."

=== Ewell Monastery (OC) ===
Ewell Monastery was an experimental Cistercian community of monks within the Anglican Church from 1966 to 2004, located at West Malling in Kent. The revival of religious communities within the Anglican Communion during the 18th century, and more especially the nineteenth and twentieth centuries, was influenced by many of the traditional monastic rules, particularly those of the Benedictine, Franciscan, and Augustinian Orders. There were few attempts to revive the Cistercian Rule within the Anglican communion prior to 1966, and none that lasted more than a few years. In 1966 the Revd Fr Aelred Arneson OC, established his Cistercian community, which came to receive official recognition by both the Church of England and the world-wide Cistercian Order within the Roman Catholic Church. Fr Aelred OC was the Prior throughout the life of the monastery. The Abbey buildings were constructed on the site of a former farm, with an ancient Tithe Barn being developed into the community chapel. This chapel remains after the closure of the monastery, and is a Grade II* listed building. The Cistercian Rule was never popular within Anglicanism, and the community never numbered more than five members, although these were often strengthened by temporary residents at the monastery from amongst the associates of the Order. From 1987 to 2004 there were only two members in the community, and Fr Aelred made the decision in 2004 to close the monastery. Fr Aelred continued to live the religious life as a Cistercian solitary, with the distinction of being the sole member of the worldwide Anglican Communion to be living under the strict Cistercian Rule of life until his death, aged 96, on 7 January 2022, although some Anglican religious follow an adapted form of the Cistercian Rule. In 2010 a dispersed, uncloistered community was established as the Order of Anglican Cistercians in the Church of England.

== Former communities for women ==
=== Community of the Epiphany (CE) ===
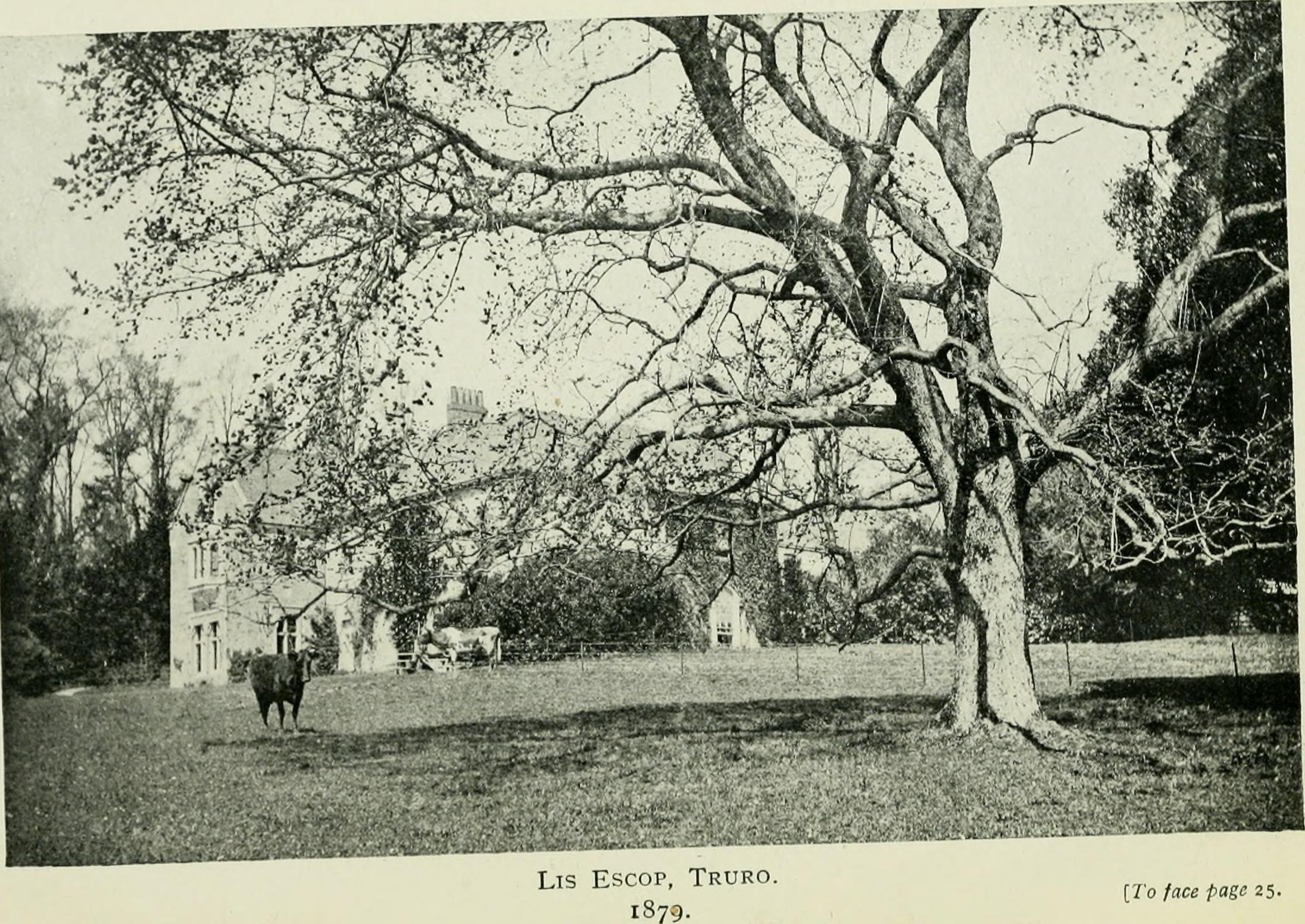
Lis Escop, Kenwyn, 1879

The Community of the Epiphany was founded in 1883 by George Wilkinson, Bishop of Truro, who afterwards became Bishop of St Andrews, Dunkeld and Dunblane. The community was formed for work in the Truro diocese and was based at the Convent of the Epiphany, Truro, Cornwall. The sisters were involved in pastoral and educational work, the care of Truro Cathedral and St Paul's Church, and church needlework. The head of the community was the Mother Superior. There was for some forty years an active branch house in Tokyo, Japan, and there was a more long-term branch house at Penzance. Branch houses were also opened in Newquay, and Truro (separate from the mother house). The sisters ran a convalescent home in St Agnes, and in Truro (in addition to the main convent and the Truro branch house) they ran a small school (Rosewin School) and a retreat house (St Michael's House). The main convent was originally located at Alverton House in Tregolls Road. The house, built in the early nineteenth century, was extended for the convent, and the chapel was built in 1910 by Edmund H. Sedding. After a century at Tregolls Road it moved to Copeland Court in Kenwyn. After a very full history, covering 125 years, the community was reduced to its last surviving member. In 2008 Sr Elizabeth CE attracted some attention in the local and national press, as the last surviving member of the order; she was then 92, and living in a nursing home, but still engaged in charitable work; she died in 2017, aged 101. In 1936 the sisters founded a parallel community for Japanese women, the Community of Nazareth, which achieved full independence in the 1960s. This community continues its work in Tokyo and Okinawa.

=== Community of Jesus of Nazareth ===
An Anglican order of sisters whose convent was in the small village of Westcote in Gloucestershire. It was founded by Mother Geraldine Mott at the suggestion of Brother Edward Bulstrode, formerly a novice with the Cowley Fathers, to support the establishment of a training centre for village evangelism. (Br. Edward went on to establish the Disciples of Jesus of Nazareth - later known as the Village Evangelists.) It was the only Anglican Order in the British Isles to live on faith and trust alone. The Sisters brought nothing with them, no dowry, and were allowed no income. They relied on prayer, hard work and donations to sustain them and their missions. The Sisters’ chief work was to provide help for priests in their parishes. As the years went by, the community was asked to work in many parishes including Pentonville, Poplar, Peckham, Acton and Knightsbridge in London, Burgess Hill in Sussex and St. Aidan’s Birmingham, St. Peter’s Plymouth, Grimsby, Hull and Sunderland where Archbishop Ramsey visited the Sisters from York. He subsequently wrote to the Convent, asking for more help in the province. Their work ranged far and wide from Tewkesbury Abbey to St. Albans and to St Ninian's Cathedral, Perth. The Community was active from 1927 to 1969, at which point it merged with the Little Sisters of Charity.

=== Community of Nazareth ===
Founded in 1936, it was established in Tokyo by the English Community of the Epiphany. It is now under the jurisdiction of the Anglican Church in Japan, the Nippon Sei Ko Kai, and operates a daughter house on the island of Okinawa. The community's chapel, residential compound and retreat center located in Mitaka, Tokyo, is a noted design by Japanese architect Shōzō Uchii.

=== Community of the Presentation (CP) ===
Founded in 1927 as a nursing order, originally named the Nursing Community of Christ the Consoler, the sisters lived in a convent and nursing home in Highgate in north London, and maintained a convalescent home in Hythe, Kent, and after a short time renamed themselves the Community of the Presentation. In 1935 they took over St Saviour's House from the Community of the Epiphany. This House, opened in Regents Park in 1845, and relocated to Osnaburgh Street, London, in 1852, was also a nursing home, and the Presentation sisters closed their original Highgate home. In 1960 St Saviour's House was subject to a compulsory purchase order, and the sisters decided to relocate to the site of their existing convalescent home in Hythe, opening a new thirteen-bed hospital, St Saviour's Hospital. Running the hospital alone until 1975, from January 1976 the sisters began to employ nurses who were not members of the community. Their numbers declined, and a board of trustees took over the running of the hospital. Brigadier Ronnie Winfield, appointed Chairman of the Trustees in 1981, began an expansion programme up to a modern standard 36-bed hospital, and in 1989 this was sold to a private hospital company. The sisters' chapel had already been sold and converted into a private clinic. The remaining assets of the Community of the Presentation were invested to form the St Saviour's Medical Charity, for the benefit of the people of Hythe. The last remaining sisters continued to live in the convent beside the hospital during these last changes, until only one sister remained. Sr May CP moved in 1997 to live with the Community of St Francis in Birmingham, and died on 9 January 1999, ending the life of the Community. From 1960 until the 1980s the sisters were the owners and guardians of The Buxheim Carvings.

=== Community of St Michael and All Angels (CSM&AA) ===
Bishop Edward Twells (Bishop of Bloemfontein) wrote in 1868 highlighting the need for a Sisterhood to set up schools for girls in Bloemfontein. The Community was founded by Twells' successor, Bishop Allan Webb in 1874. A party of seven led by Mother Emma (Mother Superior) traveled from England to Bloemfontein in 1874, and immediately opened a boarding school, St Michael's, and a day school. St Michael's School exists to this day as one of the leading schools in South Africa. In 1877 the Community also established the St George's Cottage Hospital in Bloemfontein, the first hospital in the Orange Free State. The Community also pioneered nursing ministry in Kimberley, from 1876, where Sister Henrietta Stockdale organised the training of nurses at the Carnarvon Hospital. She was later influential in securing the first state registration of nurses in the world, in 1891. Sister Joan Marsh, the last member of the Community, died aged 97 in Bloemfontein in May 2016.

=== Community of the Servants of the Cross ===
This community was founded in 1877 to nurse and care for the aged and infirm, and to live a life of prayer and hospitality. It was unusual in aiming to recruit nuns from working-class backgrounds, rather than the upper middle class from which many orders drew their sisters. The community moved to Sussex in 1895 where it remained for over 100 years. Their Chichester convent closed in 1996, and the Sisters moved to a nursing home on the site of the former Chichester Theological College, and the last sister died in 2003.

=== Community of Reparation to Jesus in the Blessed Sacrament (CRJBS) ===
A community of nuns in the Church of England, founded in 1869, whose work came to an end in the early 1990s. The last remaining member, Sr Esther Mary CRJBS (died 5 January 2006), lived for several years with the sisters of the Community of St John Baptist (CSJB), and then for the final months of her life moved to St Peter's Convent, Woking. The order was founded following a meeting at All Saints, Margaret Street, by members of the Confraternity of the Blessed Sacrament (including the President, Canon Carter of Clewer, and his friend Father Goulden (1834-1896)), to make reparation for any dishonour perceived to have been done to Jesus in the Blessed Sacrament. From 1869 to 1872 the first sisters served as novices at CSJB, but from 1872 they worked together from a mission house in Southwark, south London. In 1912 they were able to construct their own convent, the Convent of Reparation, Rushworth Street, Southwark, designed by Sir Walter Tapper, who had then recently designed the mother house for the Community of the Resurrection at Mirfield. From 1938 until 1966, the Community was involved in the Parish of Holy Cross, Greenford Magna, (Middlesex), with a second convent, the Convent of Reparation, opening at Ealing in 1939, moving to White Rose Lane, Woking (Surrey) in 1948. This served as the Mother House of the Community until the community returned to Southwark in 1957. In November 1979, the Community accepted the offer of hospitality of the CSJB at Clewer, with the convent at Rushworth Street sold in 1981.

=== Congregation of the Servants of Christ (CSC) ===
From 1906 the community were based in Pleshey, in what is now the Chelmsford Diocesan House of Retreat, before moving to Potters Bar in 1914 after the Evangelical first Bishop of Chelmsford Bishop John Watts-Ditchfield would not allow them to reserve the Blessed Sacrament. From 1920 the Congregation of the Servants of Christ lived at Britwell Court near Burnham, Buckinghamshire, renaming it The House of Prayer. The Sisters joined with the Community of St Mary at the Cross at Edgware in October 1989.

=== Poor Clares of Reparation and Adoration (PCRep) ===
The 'Poor Clares' are the second order of the Franciscan religious movement, more formally known as the Order of St Clare. The Poor Clares of Reparation and Adoration were founded in 1922 and based at St Clare's Convent on Mount Sinai, Long Island, New York. Members of the Order of St Clare live an enclosed life, and the Poor Clares of Reparation and Adoration also maintained a perpetual watch before the Blessed Sacrament. The last remaining sister died in 2003, leaving the Community of St. Clare in England as the only remaining Poor Clare community in the Anglican Communion. However, the Little Sisters of St. Clare in the United States do have some members living the Poor Clare life and Rule, within the somewhat flexible bounds of that community's style.

=== Sisterhood of the Epiphany (SE) ===
The Sisterhood of the Epiphany (SE), more formally entitled the Oxford Mission Sisterhood of the Epiphany, was a companion body for women, working alongside the Brotherhood of the Epiphany (see above) in India and Bangladesh. The Sisterhood was founded in 1902 under the leadership of Edith Langridge, and followed a slightly adapted version of the Benedictine Rule. The mother house was located at Barisal (then British India, but now Bangladesh), and there were several branch houses, the largest at Calcutta. The work of the sisters was very broad in scope, including evangelism, medical work, educational activity amongst women, and (in Calcutta) the provision of both a primary school and an orphanage. In 1970 a parallel community was founded for sisters of Bangladeshi nationality, named the Christa Sevika Sangha (Handmaids of Christ), and in 1986 this order became fully independent. The foundress, Sr Susila SE, left the Sisterhood of the Epiphany to become the first Mother Superior CSS, an office she still held until her death on 16 May 2011. At the same time another sister (Sr Leonore SE) transferred to the Community of St. Francis in order to follow the Franciscan Rule. By the early 1990s only three SE sisters remained, and they left Bangladesh (where the work in continued by CSS) and returned to England, taking up residence at Ditchingham with the Community of All Hallows. The last three sisters died there – Mother Joan in 1999, Sr Rosamund in 2003, and Mother Winifred on 26 May 2010, when the Sisterhood ended.

=== Society of the Most Holy Trinity (SHT) ===
The Society of the Most Holy Trinity, also known more simply as the Society of the Holy Trinity, was established by Lydia Sellon in 1849, the second Anglican religious order established for women, to minister to the poor in the seafaring community of Devonport, hence their popular name, the Devonport Sisters. The society expanded rapidly, and in the 1850s absorbed several smaller London communities, including the first-established, the Sisterhood of the Holy Cross (or 'Park Village Community'). The order grew large and very active, from its work with Florence Nightingale in the Crimea, to the establishing of a convalescent hospital and a grammar school (St Christopher's). The rule of the order was based on that of St Francis de Sales. From 1860, the community was resident at Ascot Priory in Berkshire, which remained its headquarters until the closure of the community in 2004. At the start of the 2000s the community had grown very small, and some sisters were placed with other (larger) orders, such as Sr Rosemary SHT who lived her final years with the Community of the Holy Name. The last sister was Reverend Mother Cecilia SHT, who joined the community in 1935, having been born in 1914, and offered herself as a postulant at the age of 18. She died on 12 February 2004, aged 89, and thus ended the life of the society. Before her death, Mother Cecilia established a trust to ensure that the buildings at Ascot Priory continued to be used for the good of the Church of England and of society in general, principally in the care of the elderly, but also through the provision of facilities for retreats and conferences.

=== Order of St Elizabeth of Hungary ===
Reverend Mother Elizabeth (detail) painted by John Collier

The Order of St Elizabeth of Hungary was a Franciscan Order, founded in London in 1916; it took its name from the 13th-century saint and princess Elizabeth of Hungary (Elizabeth of Thuringia), who was influenced by the early Franciscans and lived a religious life in Marburg. The Order was founded as an offshoot of the Confraternity of Divine Love, and Reverend Mother Elizabeth (Elizabeth Ann Hodges, 1869-1960) was the founder both of the Confraternity and of the Order in its final form. It retained three male priests to function as the Visitor, the Warden, and the Chaplain. In 1923 the Visitor was the Bishop of London, and the Warden was the Revd and Hon E. Lyttleton DD.

The English Order of St Elizabeth of Hungary was devoted mainly to mission work among the poor of Southwest London, and was based at the Convent of St Elizabeth, 94 Redcliffe Gardens, London SW10, and had retreat houses at Oakhurst (Kent), and St Mary's Retreat, Heathfield (Sussex). It also had a children's home and guest house at 10 Earl's Court Square, London, and a home for retired ladies at Mayfield (Sussex). St Margaret's Guest House was also operated at Heathfield, near St Mary's Retreat. The Order also operated extensively in Western Australia, with convents at Bunbury, Busselton, and Margaret River. The sisters undertook missions to women and girls, and were responsible for Church Girl's Institutes as well as Children's Homes. The sisters observed a fruitarian diet, and were committed to absolute poverty, owning no property or invested funds.

A short history of the Order and its work among the poor was published in 1967 entitled Into the Deep and subtitled "The story of the Confraternity of the Divine Love and the Order of St Elizabeth of Hungary by Mother Elizabeth of the Order of St Elizabeth of Hungary”. Little Grey Sparrows of the Anglican Diocese of Bunbury, Western Australia by Merle Bignall (1992) deals with the history of the Order with particular reference to its work in Australia, which began in the 1920s. The Sisters of the Order referred to themselves as Sparrows and wore grey habits.

The Order continued to appear in the Post Office Directory at 94 Redcliffe Gardens until 1971. By 2000, it was under the care of the Anglican Community of St Peter (founded 1861), which is based at St Peter’s Convent, Maybury Hill, Woking, Surrey. The archives of the Order of St Elizabeth of Hungary for the period 1904–1990 are held at Lambeth Palace Library in London under reference 3862-93.

=== Community of St Wilfrid ===
The Community of St Wilfrid was founded in Exeter in 1866 by the Reverend John Gilberd Pearse, Rector of All Hallows-on-the-Wall Church in that city. From a convent in Bartholomew Street the sisters had a ministry to the poor and underprivileged, for whom they had been founded. The sisters lived in the convent for a hundred years from 1866 to 1966. In 1870, under the provisions of the Elementary Education Act 1870, the sisters opened the Forty School to provide a basic education to 40 poor children in the city. The school grew in size and importance, and became the community's main work, eventually under the name St Wilfrid's School. The sisters also ran an orphanage, a soup kitchen, and outreach ministries amongst the poor and the destitute.

The sisters and the school had their own chapels, but on the Feast of St Wilfrid each year the sisters and the children of the school all paraded through the streets to Exeter Cathedral for their patronal festival celebrations. The community gave up running the school in 1988 as the remaining teaching sisters were elderly, but the school was handed over to independent operation, and remains open, continuing the charism and history of the community. The noviciate of the community was closed, and following the death of the final sisters (Sister Elsie in 1997, and Mother Lillian in 2004, aged 107) the community closed.

=== Community of St Peter (CSP) ===
The Community (or Sisterhood) of St Peter was founded on 25 June 1861 by Benjamin Lancaster and his wife Rosamira. He was a governor of St George's Hospital, Hyde Park, and saw a need to provide for convalescent patients leaving hospital. The community was originally called "The Nursing Sisters of the Church of England", but in 1864, to avoid confusion with other orders, it was renamed "The Home and Sisterhood of St Peter". The sisters lived a life of regular prayer while caring for their convalescent patients. The first Superior was Susan Oldfield. Originally housed in Nos. 27 and 48 Brompton Square, London, the community moved their mother house to Kilburn in 1869. In 1882 they were given land at Maybury Hill near Woking, Surrey, where in 1885 they opened a Memorial Home in memory of Rosamira Lancaster (died 1874). This continued to expand, with a chapel being added in 1900, and the home became the mother house of the sisterhood in 1944 when the Kilburn convent was destroyed by bombing. The sisters also had a subsidiary site in Somerset for tuberculosis patients, and provided nursing care for cholera victims in London and a holiday home for poor children at St Leonards-on-Sea. Beginning in 1892 at the request of Bishop Corfe, 17 or 18 sisters were sent as missionaries to Korea, and in 1925 Sister Mary Clare of the Woking community became the first superior of a new Society of the Holy Cross (Korea).

As the need for convalescence lessened, St Peter's Home at Maybury Hill became a nursing home for the elderly, and at various times also included a guest house and a home for adults with learning difficulties. From the late 1960s there was also a separate retreat centre. By the late 1980s the number of sisters had declined and the original convent was sold. A new nursing home opened in 1988 and operated until 2002; a new convent was built in 1990 and closed in 2007, the community being dispersed and the building redeveloped as apartments. By 2020 there were only two surviving sisters (Mother Angela and Sister Margaret Paul), and the community was formally dissolved. The retreat centre on the site at St Columba's House remains in independent operation. The chapel of the former convent is now owned by the Society of St Pius X.

== See also ==
- Anglican religious orders
- Augustinian nuns in the Anglican Communion
- Franciscan orders in the Anglican Communion
- Order of St. Benedict (Anglican)
