= Bishop of Barisal =

Bishop of Barisal could refer to the bishop of the:

- Church of Bangladesh Diocese of Barisal
- Roman Catholic Diocese of Barisal
