= Christa Sevika Sangha =

Anglican religious congregation of missionary sisters

Handmaids of Christ
- Bengali: খ্রীষ্ট সেবিকা সংঘ
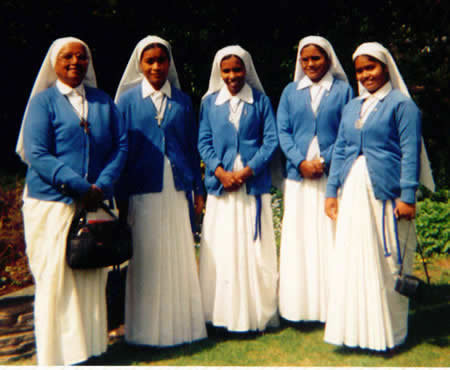
- Handmaids of Christ & The CSS Sisters
- Abbreviation: CSS
- Formation: 25th of January 1970 (54 years ago)
- Founder: Mother Susila, SE
- Founded at: Barisal, Bangladesh
- Type: National religious congregation for women of Church of Bangladesh
- Headquarters: Oxford Mission Church
- Members: 14 as of 2024
- Ministry: Primarily Apostolic
- Vows: Evangelical courses or Benedictine vows including celibacy
- Superior General: Sr. Dorothy, CSS
- Parent organization: Church of Bangladesh
- Website: churchofbangladesh.org

The Christa Sevika Sangha (Handmaids of Christ), CSS, is an Anglican religious order for women based in Jobarpar, Church of Bangladesh Diocese of Barisal, in Bangladesh. It is a vow for women in the Anglican Church of Bangladesh.

== History ==
In 1970, the Sisterhood of the Epiphany, a group of largely British-ethnicity sisters working in Bangladesh, formed a parallel community for sisters of Bangladeshi nationality, and chose the name Christa Sevika Sangha (Handmaids of Christ). The key founder was Sr Susila SE. In 1986 the order became fully independent. At that time the foundress, Sr Susila SE, left the Sisterhood of the Epiphany to become the first Mother Superior CSS, an office she continued to hold until her death on 16 May 2011. In total she led the community for 41 years, and was Mother Superior for 26 years. The Sevikas have a longstanding attachment to the Oxford Mission Church, and are often referred to simply as the "Oxford Mission Sisters".

== Work ==
The sisters supervise hostels for young girls, and a play centre for small children. They are involved in work at local schools and other community projects. They offer a four-fold daily office in Bengali language, as well as a daily eucharist, and a daily informal quiet prayer session.

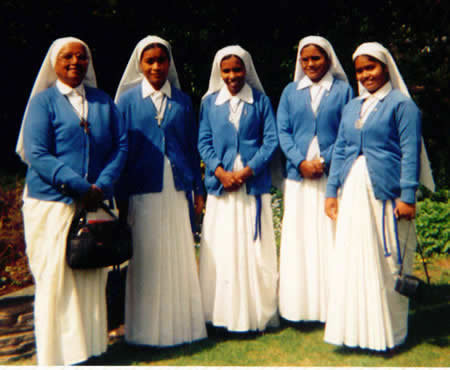
Handmaids of Christ & The CSS Sisters
