= Diocese of Barisal =

Diocese of Barisal could refer to:

- Church of Bangladesh Diocese of Barisal
- Roman Catholic Diocese of Barisal
