= Ted Harris (pastor) =

Edward "Ted" Harris is a Swedish-Barbadian Doctor of Divinity, writer and pastor.

Dr. Harris also leads workshops in existential questions, arranges retreats and pilgrimages. He is the senior pastor at downtown Stockholms Adolf Fredriks kyrka, author and expert on Danish philosopher and theologian Søren Kierkegaard .

Harris was born in Barbados and the family emigrated to the United Kingdom when he was 13 years old. He has described his time in London as very hard. In his mid 20s he came to Copenhagen, met his soon to be Swedish wife and was introduced to writings of Danish theologian Søren Kierkegaard.

With his wife he moved to Sweden where he has remained ever since. In 1987 he became a pastor with the Swedish Lutheran church. He has a theology degree and wrote his Ph.D. thesis on Kierkegaard. Dr. Harris has for many years been arranging Taizé music and worship services and was the man who introduced this form of church service in Sweden According to Sweden's largest newspaper, the introduction of Taizé worship service by Pastor Harris, has attracted many young Swedish people who might not have been interested in organized religion.

Pastor Harris is a member of Franciskus Tredje Orden, FTO in the Church of Sweden (part of the European Province of the Third Order of the Anglican Society of St Francis).

== Radio and TV ==
During the summer of 2010, he was one of several hosts of legendary radio program Sommar. Earlier this year he was featured on Jonas Gardell's sometimes controversial television series on religion Hur uppstod Gud? He has also been featured main guest in other radio and television shows such as Mötet i P4 and Önskegästen.

== Personal life ==
He lives in Stockholm City Centre with his wife. They have two children, Mariell and Christopher (a researcher in cognitive science).

== Books ==
Konsten att leva innerligt : existentialism för den moderna människa – The Art of Living Sincerely (2008) - Co-written with Ann Lagerström
