= OEF =

OEF may refer to:

- Obscene Extreme Festival, Czech Republic
- Operation Enduring Freedom, the United States' name for its 2001–2021 wars
- Operation Epic Fury, the United States' name for its 2026 military action against Iran
- Order of Ecumenical Franciscans, an interdenominational Christian group
- Oxygen extraction fraction, in medicine
