= TSSF =

TSSF can refer to:

- Third Order, Society of Saint Francis, an Anglican Religious order
- The Story So Far (band), a Californian pop punk band
