= Shourabh Pholia =

Bishop of Barishal of Church of Bangladesh

The Right Reverend Shourabh Pholia COB
- Deputy Moderator of All Church of Bangladesh; Bishop of Barisal
- Church: Church of Bangladesh
- Diocese: Barisal
- Installed: 2017
- Other post: Deputy Moderator of the Church of Bangladesh

Orders
- Consecration: 30 April 2017 by Samuel Sunil Mankhin

Personal details
- Born: Sourabh Pholia
- Residence: Oxford Mission Church
- Education: University of Dhaka
- Coat of arms

Styles of Shourabh Pholia
- Reference style: The Right Reverend
- Spoken style: My Lord
- Religious style: Bishop

Shourabh Pholia is a Bangladeshi bishop. Since 2017, he has been bishop of Barisal and deputy moderator of the Church of Bangladesh. Pholia was previously a priest of Oxford Mission Church. The Church of Bangladesh is a United Protestant denomination resulting from the merger of Anglican and Presbyterian denominations in that country.
