= Oxford Mission Church =

Coordinates: 22.7042°N 90.3628°E

Epiphany Cathedral Church
- Oxford Mission Church
- এপিফানী ক্যাথেড্রাল চার্চ
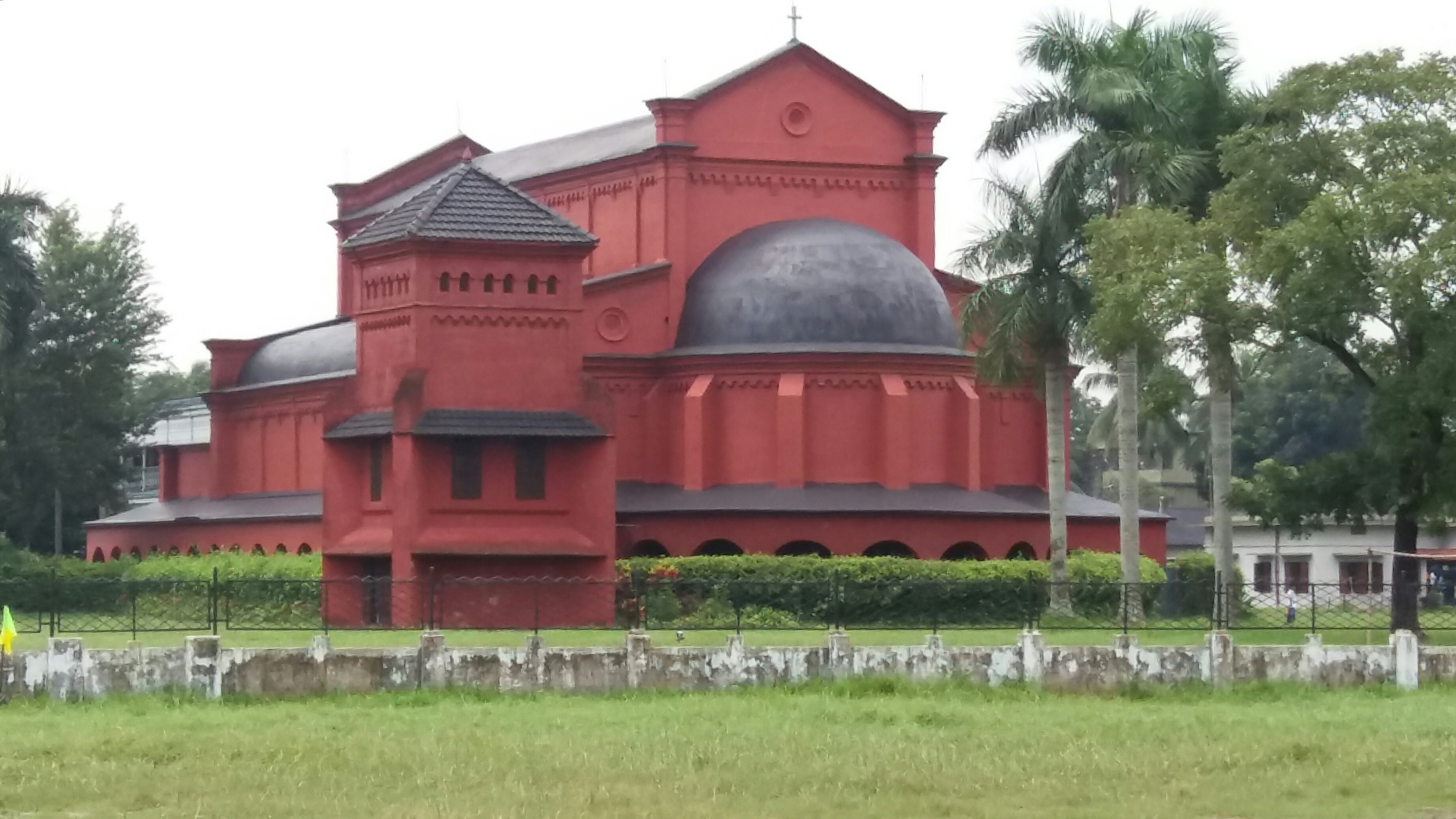

- Location within Bangladesh
- Location: Poet Jibanando Das Street, Bogra Road, Barisal
- Country: Bangladesh
- Denomination: Anglican
- Churchmanship: Church of Bangladesh

History
- Status: Cathedral
- Founded: 1903
- Founder: Oxford Mission

Architecture
- Architect(s): Sister Edith Langridge, Father E. L. Strong
- Style: Greek architecture

Administration
- Province: Dhaka
- Diocese: Barishal

Clergy
- Bishop: The Right Reverend Shourabh Pholia
- Priest(s): Fr. Francis, SPB

Oxford Mission Epiphany Cathedral Church, commonly known as Oxford Mission Church and the Church of Bangladesh Diocese of Barisal, is a United Protestant church in Barisal, a southern city in Bangladesh. It is one of the oldest and arguably the second largest church in Asia by land area and the largest Church in Bangladesh. It was built in 1904 as part of the Church of India, Burma and Ceylon, the Anglican province in colonial India, and became a part of the United Protestant Church of Bangladesh at the time of the merger between various Protestant denominations in that country.

== History ==
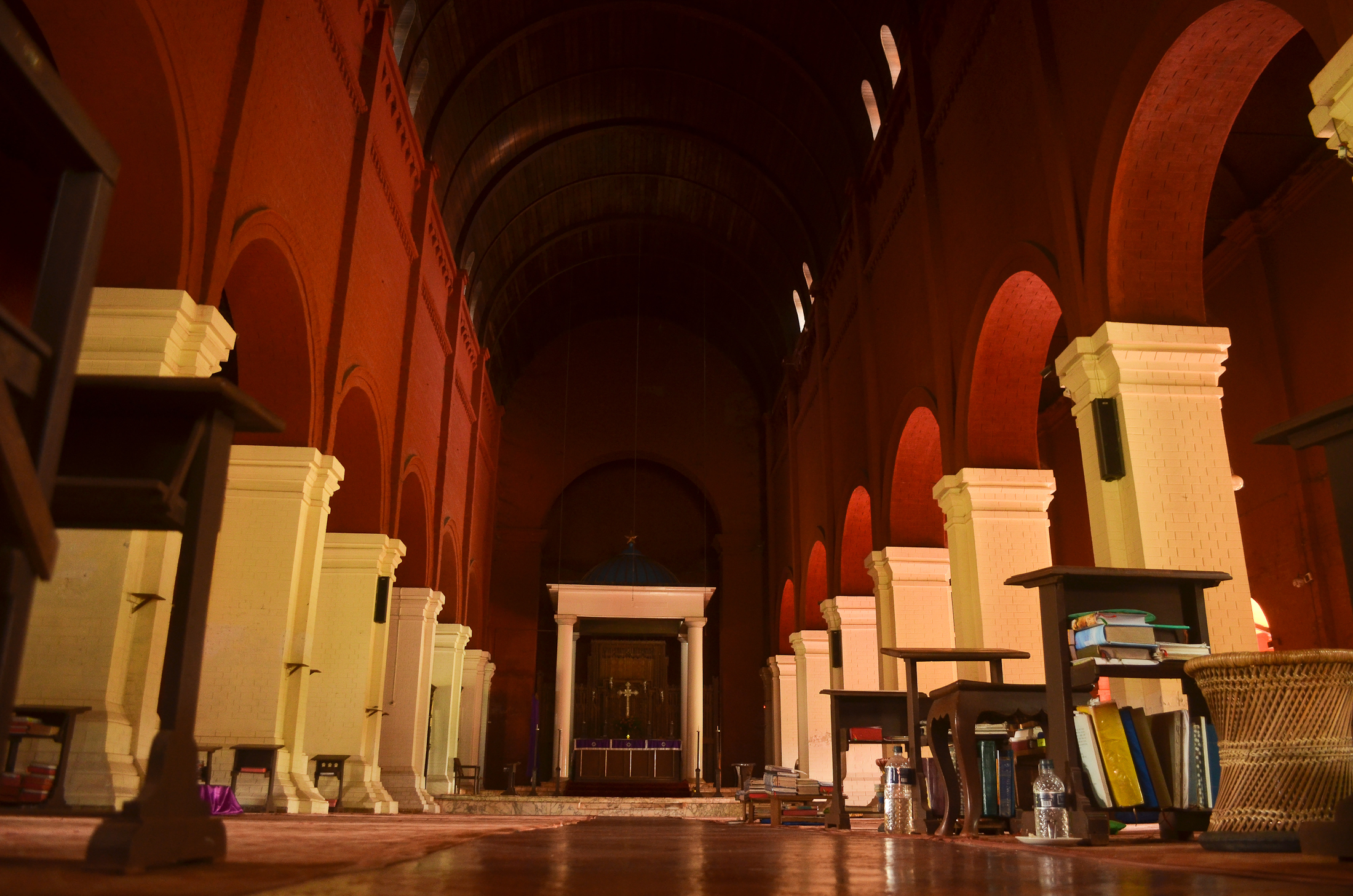
Oxford Mission Church, Barisal

In the early 18th century, the ancient river port city Barisal attracted many Christian missionaries. Oxford Mission, an England-based Anglican missionary started its journey in this region from at the end of the 19th century and formed Brotherhood of the Epiphany in 1895. In 1902, a Sisterhood was formed at Barisal under the guidance of Father Strong to work alongside the Brotherhood. The missionary opened an English boarding school, Christian youth hostels, an orphanage, a primary school and a medical centre in its compound at Bogra Road. The work of the sisters was very broad in scope, including evangelism, medical work, educational activity amongst women under the leadership of Edith Langridge. Later a branch house was formed at Jobarpar, Agailjhara thirty miles north of the town.

The Epiphany Church was established in 1903 based on a sketch of Sister Edith and inaugurated on 26 January that year. Father E. L. Strong, chief of the brotherhood, had overseen the completion of the church's design, final shape and construction through a second phase in 1907. Frederick Douglass served as the engineer. The church was built on 35 acres of land surrounded by high wall and rows of palm trees.

The church has been preserved as a cultural heritage and survived many natural disasters that occurred in the country.

== Architecture ==
The structure of the church reflects Greek architectural style. It appears to be a five-storied building from the outside, it actually has a single floor with a large prayer hall. There are many doors on three sides, 40 archways and numerous corridors around the church. The large cross on the main altar was brought from Bethlehem, Palestine. The interior has been designed with wood carvings and the floor including the baptism bath basin decorated with marble tiles. Another notable attraction of the Oxford Mission Church is the red brick bell tower and the giant bell it houses. The bell is rung seven times every day five minutes before prayers. The bell tower also houses the church's office room.

There are 13 small and large ponds and Oxford Mission High School, hospital, library, students' hostel and living quarters of the father and sisters inside the compound.

== Gallery ==
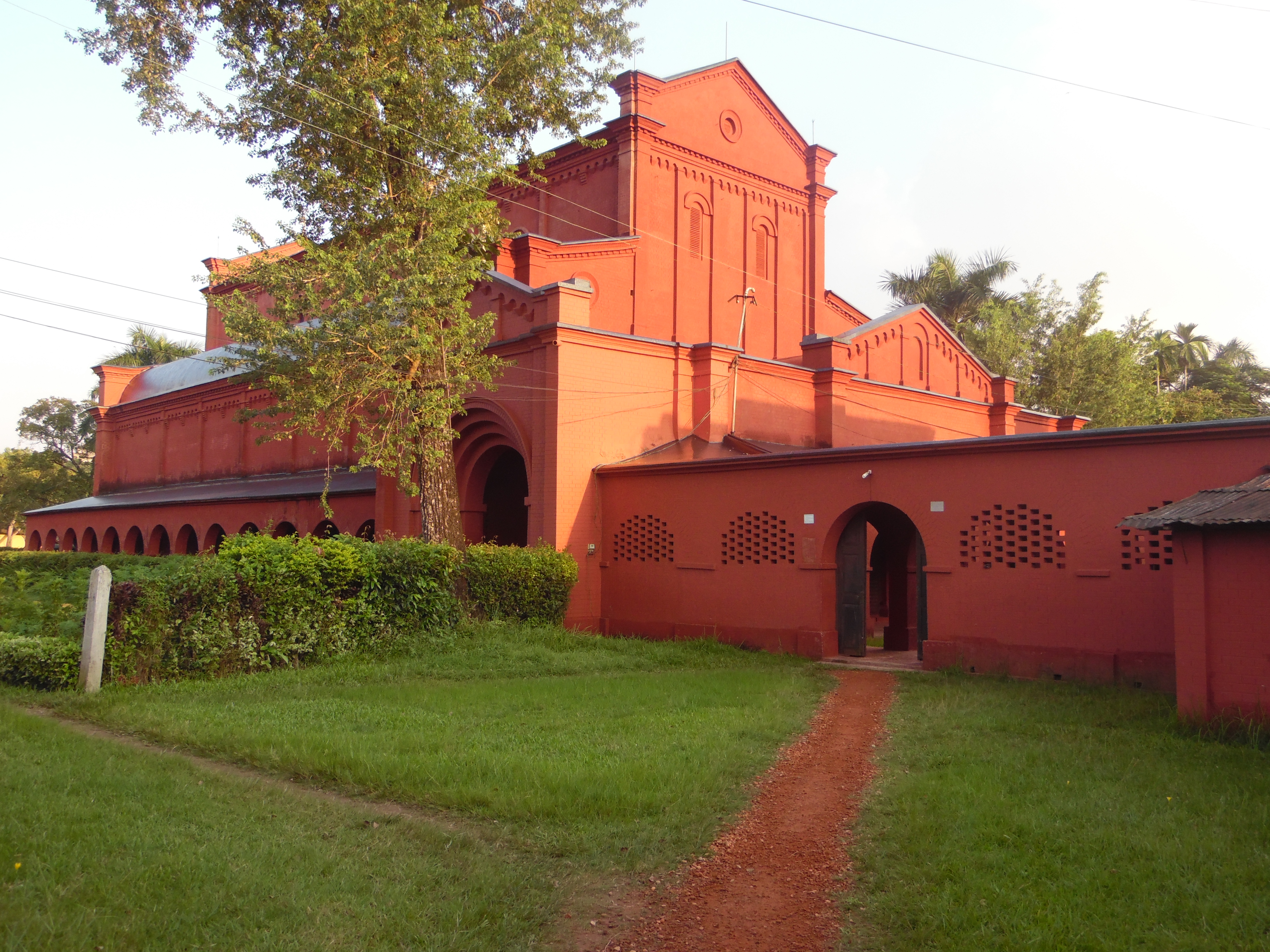

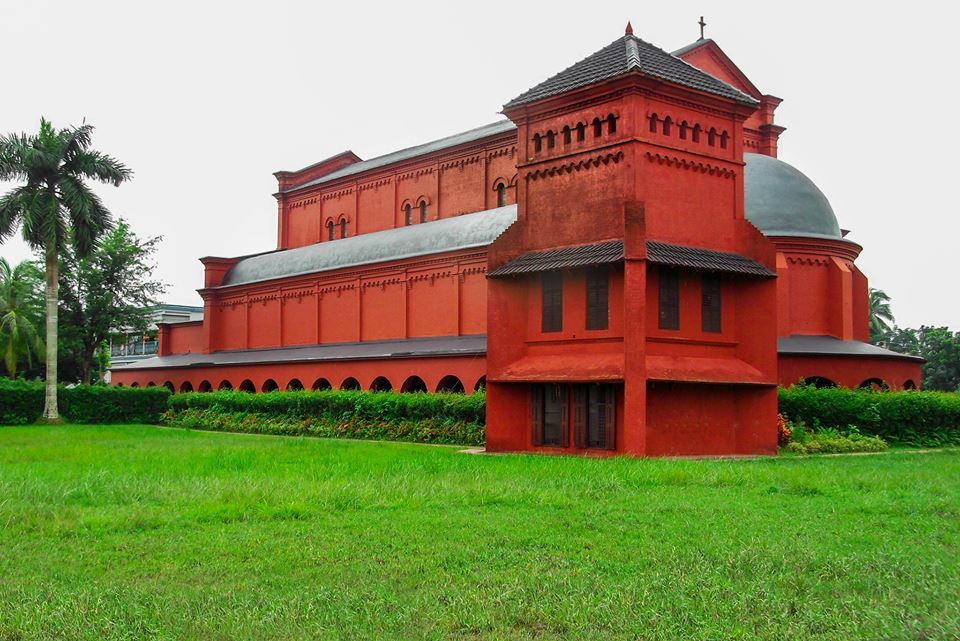

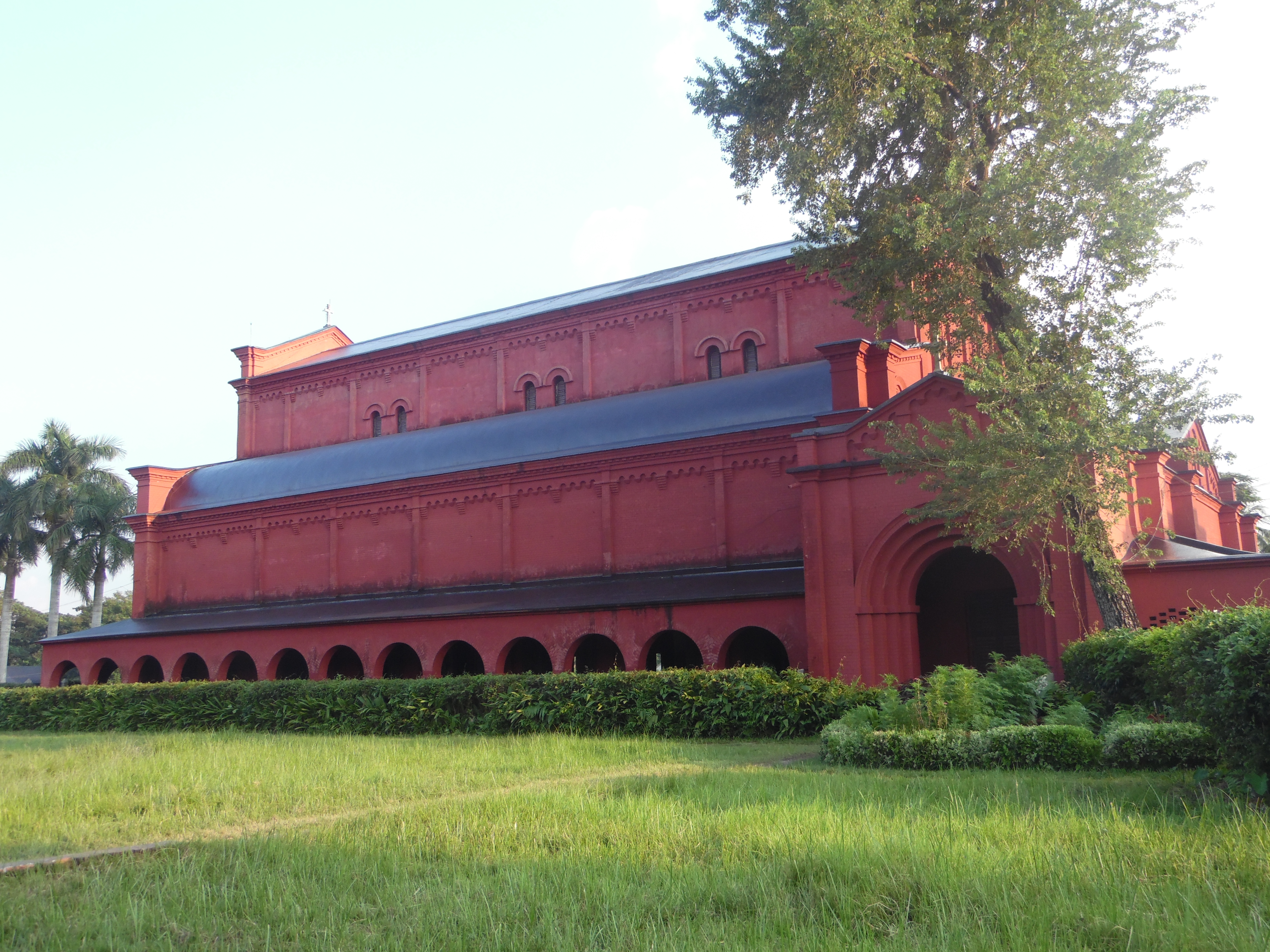

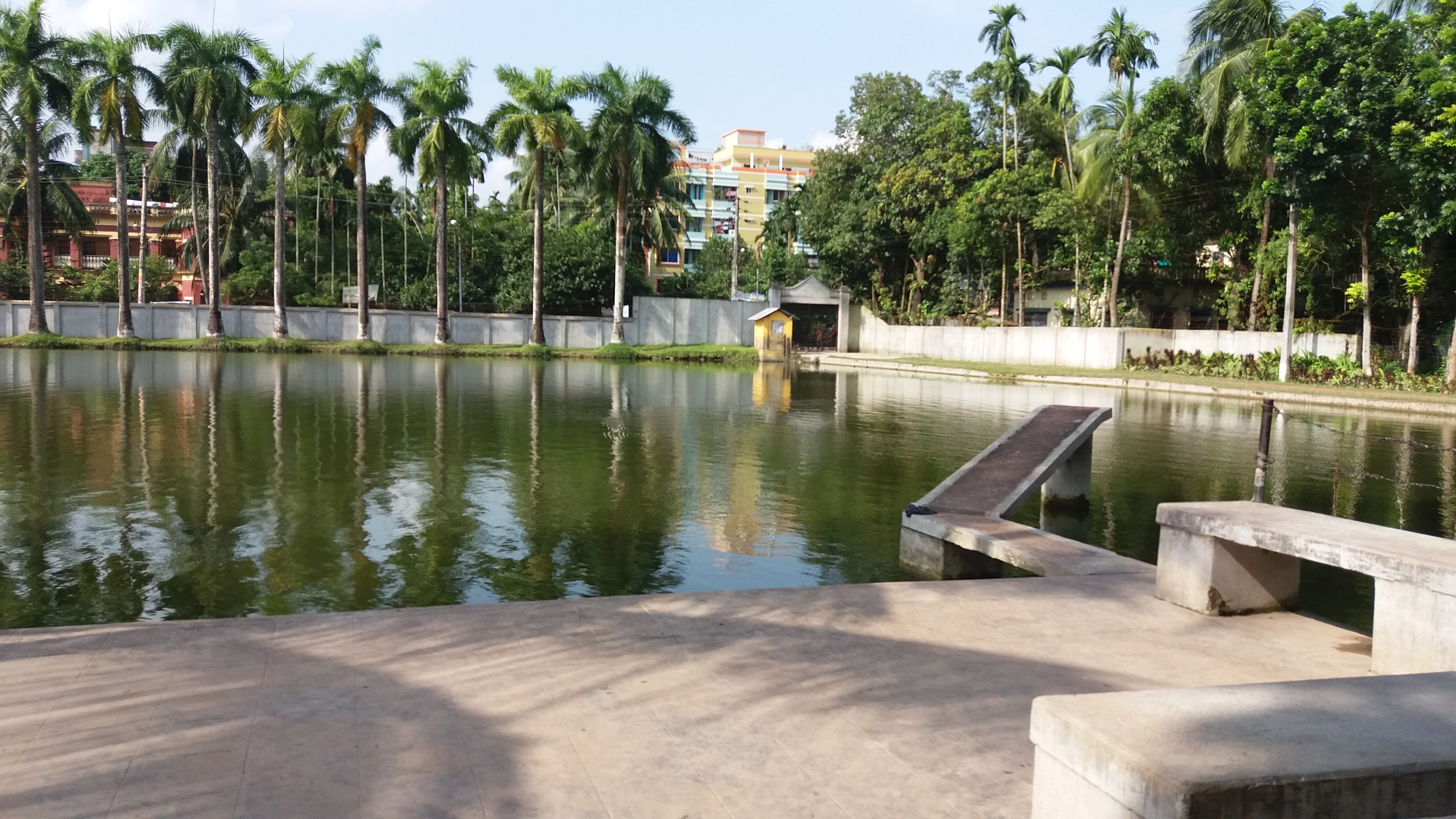

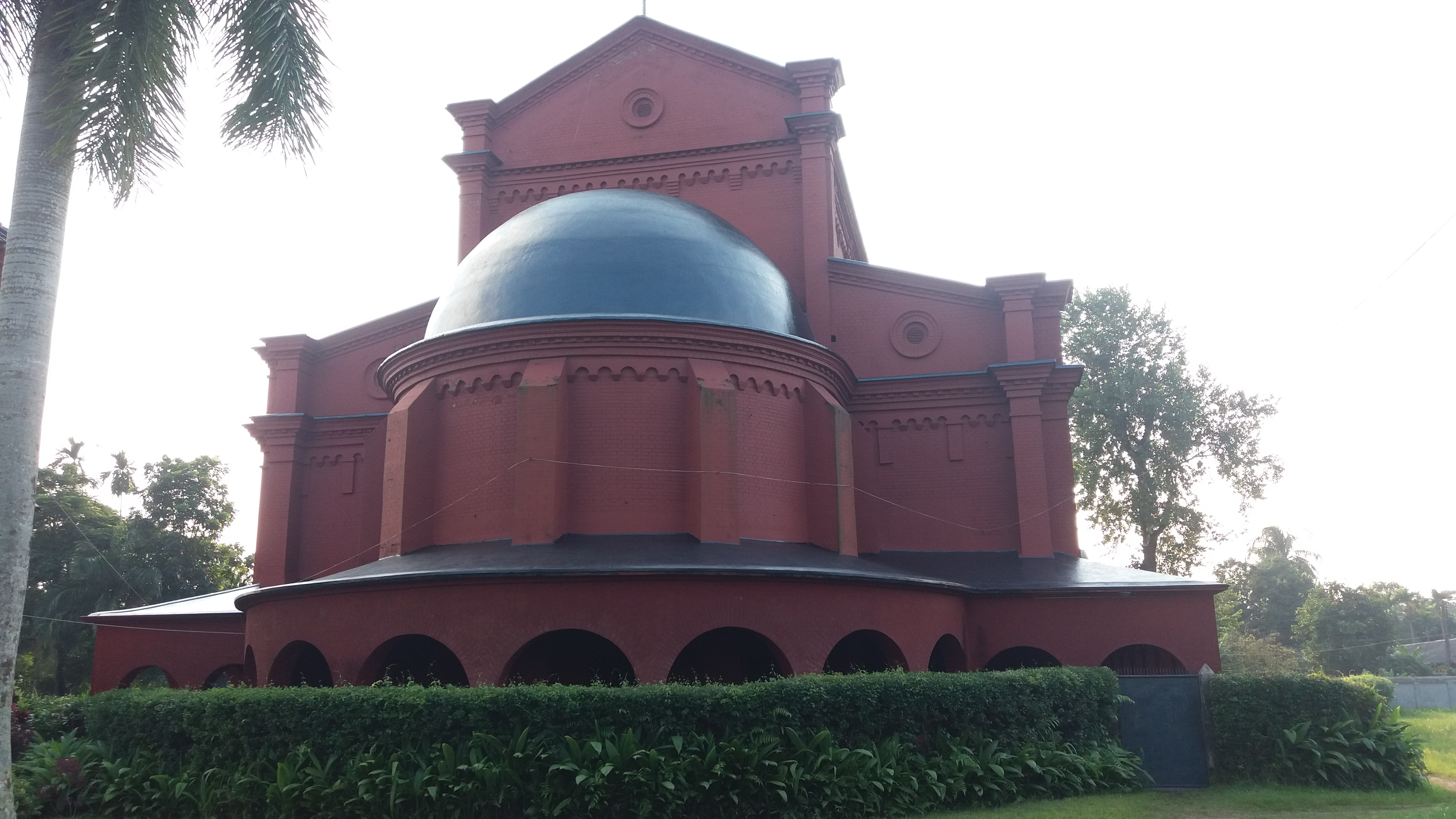
