= St Dunstan's Abbey =

Former abbey in Devon, England

Coordinates: 50.3747°N 4.1538°W

St Dunstan's Abbey, Plymouth was an abbey in Plymouth, Devon, England. The Sisters of the Most Holy Trinity under Priscilla Lydia Sellon with the support of the Henry Phillpotts, Bishop of Exeter founded an Anglican convent in New North Road.

The Gothic building was designed by William Butterfield and constructed around 1850.

Around 1906 most of the nuns had left and the building was converted into St Dunstan Abbey School For Girls. Since 2000 it was converted into flats and houses.
