= Lydia Sellon =

Founder of an Anglican women's order (1821-1876)

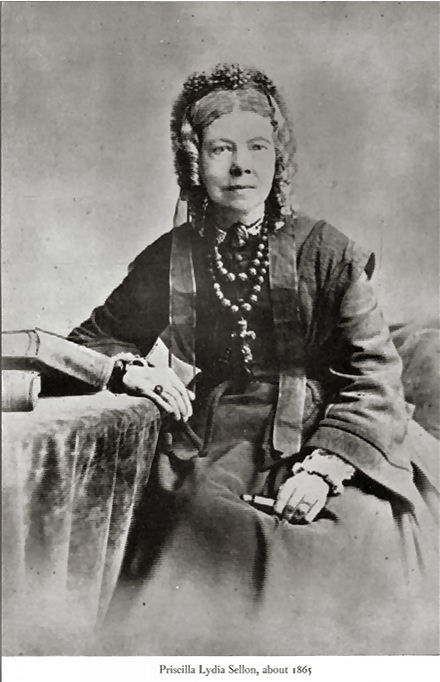
- Sellon in c. 1865
- Born: Priscilla Lydia Smith; 21 March 1821; Hampstead
- Died: 20 November 1876 (aged 55); West Malvern
- Education: by governess
- Known for: founding a religious order
- Successor: Bertha Turnbull

Lydia Sellon or Priscilla Lydia Sellon (1821 – 20 November 1876) was an English founder of an Anglican women's order. The Church of England established November 20 as a holy day to commemorate her work.

== Life ==
Priscilla Lydia Smith was brought up in Grosmont in Monmouthshire, but she was born on 21 March 1821 in Hampstead. Her mother died when she was a small child. Her father, Commander Richard Baker Smith, who was in the Royal Navy married again and had eleven more children. In 1847 her father was left an inheritance by his maternal aunt and as a consequence the family name was changed to Sellon.

In 1848 Henry Phillpotts, Bishop of Exeter, placed an appeal in the weekly Anglican newspaper The Guardian which appeared in January 1848 for help for the poor of Devonport. Phillpotts's request was for new churches and education for the population who had outgrown the local facilities. This request was answered by Sellon who was just about to travel to Italy for her health. Sellon contacted Edward Bouverie Pusey whom she knew and he introduced her to a local clergyman. Sellon and Catherine Chambers who was a family friend took advice from the local clergy and they worked in a local school. With her father's support Sellon quickly created more new institutions. An industrial school for girls, an orphanage for sailors' children, a school for the starving and a night school for teenage boys.

She started work in Devonport looking after the poor. Philpott's inspiration of Sellon led to the formation of an Anglican order which Sellon led as after a number of years there were several women working with Sellon and she founded the Devonport Sisters of Mercy. Although this was not the first Anglican sisterhood, she had the consolation of merging with the Sisterhood of the Holy Cross which had been founded in 1845 in London and Sellon led the combined organisation. Even before the organisations merged they worked together. When Florence Nightingale travelled to the Crimea in 1854 she took 38 nurses and fourteen of these were nuns from what would become Sellon's organisation. One of their important early actions was to tend to the victims if the 1849 cholera outbreak which started around Union Street.

Sellon led the new Society of the Most Holy Trinity from 1856 and by 1860 they had the first purpose built convent, Ascot Priory, built for the new order. The cost of this new building was said to be largely borne by Dr Pusey but another source considers that it was Sellon who paid the bills. The autocratic Sellon would sometimes use a Crosier and she was known as the abbess. The order still had St Dunstan's Abbey in Devon. In 1864 the sisters were asked to use their skills to improve the education of children in what is now Hawaii by Queen Emma. Queen Emma and Sellon helped four Hawaiian girls to be educated at Ascot: Palemo Kekeekaapu, Elizabeth Keomailani Crowningburg, Kealakai and Manoanoa Shaw. Palemo and Kealakai personally accompanied Emma on her trip to England in 1865. Keomailani and Manoanoa came to England in 1867 after Sellon's visit to Hawaii to found St. Andrew's Priory.

She died in West Malvern in 1876 following fifteen years of being paralysed.

== Legacy ==
The Church of England sets aside the holy day of November the 20th to remember the life of Sellon as a Restorer of the Religious Life in the Church of England.

The sisterhood continued through the twentieth century and the last member of the sisterhood died in 2004 and she was buried at Ascot Priory.
