= James Acton =

English cricketer

Personal information
- Born: 11 October 1848; Southampton, Hampshire, England
- Died: 22 August 1924 (aged 75); Reading, Berkshire, England

Domestic team information
- Years: Team
- 1880–1882: Hampshire

Career statistics
Competition	First-class
Matches	2
Runs scored	41
Batting average	13.66
100s/50s	0/0
Top score	31
Balls bowled	8
Wickets	0
Bowling average	–
5 wickets in innings	–
10 wickets in match	–
Best bowling	–
Catches/stumpings	0/–
- Source: Cricinfo, 24 December 2009

James Acton (11 October 1848 – 22 August 1924) was an English first-class cricketer.

Acton was born at Southampton in October 1848. In Southampton, he initially played club cricket for Southampton Cricket Club, prior to its dissolution in October 1874. He then proceeded to join the Mercantile Marine Cricket Club in 1875, prior to appearing in two first-class cricket matches for Hampshire, against the Marylebone Cricket Club (MCC) at Southampton in 1880 and Somerset at Taunton in 1882. In these, he scored a total of 41 runs from the lower-order, with a highest score of 31 against the MCC. Acton died at Reading in August 1924.
