= Little Brothers of Francis =

The Little Brothers of Francis are one of the family of Franciscan orders in the Anglican Communion. They are based in New South Wales, Australia.

Whilst most Franciscans follow the First Order, Second Order, or Third Order Rule, the Little Brothers follow a lesser known Rule of Life (also composed by St Francis of Assisi) for hermitages (friars living the solitary life, alone, or in small groups).

== History ==
The 19th and 20th century saw the creation of a number of religious orders in the Anglican Church. One late addition to Anglican religious life was the Little Brothers of Francis, a contemplative order of Franciscan friars within the Anglican Church of Australia. The community was founded in Australia in 1987. The founders, Geoffrey Adam, Wayne, and Howard, were former members of the Society of St Francis. Their vision was to develop a prayer-centred life in a rural setting.

== Community life ==
Although not entirely self-sufficient, the Brothers have built their own buildings of stone and timber. They have a substantial vegetable garden and orchard and also breed sheep, goats, chickens and rabbits. They publish a newsletter twice a year - the Bush Telegraph.
