= Ascot Priory =

Priory in Berkshire, England

Coordinates: 51.4169°N 0.7057°W

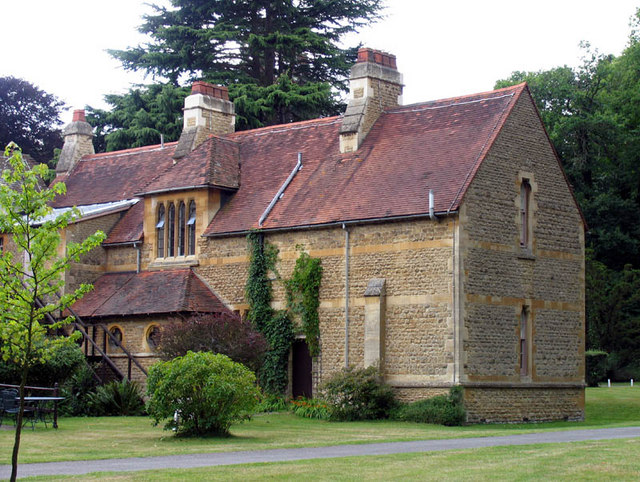
Ascot Priory, Berkshire

Ascot Priory is a former priory in Berkshire, England, established in 1861. It was the mother house of the Society of the Most Holy Trinity, a community of nuns within the Anglican Communion. It now serves as a church and spirituality centre.

== Aims and activities ==
The objects are the furtherance of the religious and other charitable purposes of the Church of England, in particular in accordance with the doctrines commonly known as Anglo-Catholic. The buildings at Ascot Priory are available to church and other Christian groups as a retreat house and conference centre. The priory church is also a focus of worship and prayer throughout the year.

== Early history ==
The community was established by Lydia Sellon in 1849 as the Society of the Most Holy Trinity, the second Anglican sisterhood, to minister to the poor in the seafaring community of Devonport, hence their popular name, the Devonport Sisters. The society expanded rapidly, and in the 1850s absorbed London communities, including the first-established, the Sisterhood of the Holy Cross ("Park Village Community").

== Current activity ==
Set in 40 acres of woodland and gardens, the priory is now a centre for retreat and spiritual renewal. There is a small regular congregation, and the main service of the week is the 10:00 am Mass in the priory church on Sundays. There is also a daily Mass from Tuesday to Friday most weeks in the Lady Chapel. Attendance at weekday Mass is mostly those attending retreats. As at January 2022 the Wardenship is vacant following retirement of Revd Paul McLaren-Cook, and regular services have been suspended since the start of the COVID-19 lockdown.
