= St Wilfrid's School, Exeter =

St Wilfrid's School - Exeter
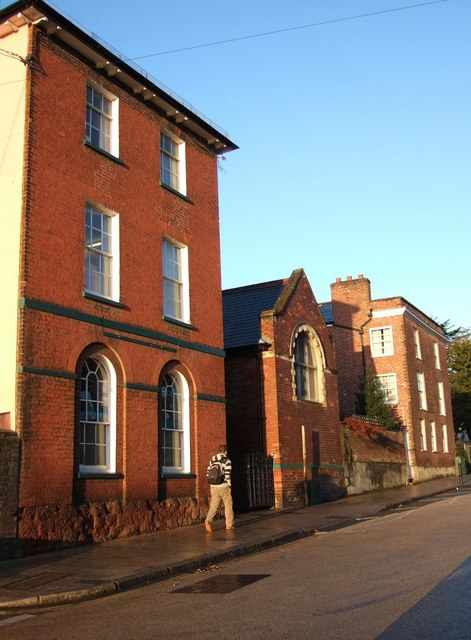

Location
- 25 – 29 St David's Hill; Exeter, EX4 4DA; England; 50°43′22″N 3°31′16″W

Information
- Type: Independent day school
- Established: 1870
- Founder: John Gilberd Pearse
- Local authority: Devon
- Department for Education URN: 113567 Tables
- Headmaster: Ross Bovingdon
- Gender: Co-educational
- Age: 3 to 16
- Enrolment: 48~
- Houses: Pankhurst; Nightingale; Churchill
- Website: http://www.stwilfrids.devon.sch.uk

St Wilfrid's School is a private and non-selective day school for girls and boys aged 3–16 in the city of Exeter in Devon, England. The school has been in existence for over 150 years following the Elementary Education Act 1870. Their motto is "The little school with a BIG personality".

== History ==
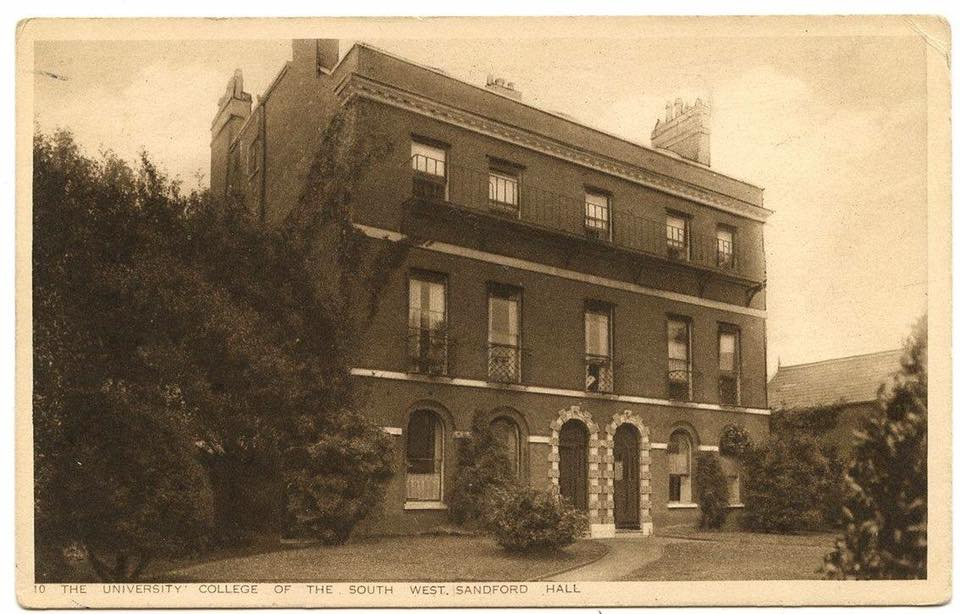
Sandford Hall, home of the school from 1950

St Wilfrid's was founded by The Reverend John Gilberd Pearse, Rector of All Hallows-on-the-Wall Church, in 1870 following the introduction of the Elementary Education Act 1870 making education compulsory for all children. Initially named the 'Forty School' due to having forty spaces, the school was attended by many children attending school for the first time. In 1890 the school moved into rooms at the Mint Methodist Church because it needed larger premises, and numbers quickly doubled.

In 1950 the orphanage run by the Sisters of St Wilfrid's on St David's Hill closed. Having outgrown the space at the Mint, the Junior School moved into Sandford Hall and the Senior school moved into the old orphanage, its present location.

Until 1967 St Wilfrid's was primarily a girls’ school although some boys were admitted in the lower years. However, in 1967, following the closure of Mount Radford School, the decision was made for St Wilfrid's school to become fully co-educational and so it became the first independent co-educational school in Exeter.

During the 70's and 80's, St Wilfrid's pupils were well known for taking food parcels to elderly residents of local almshouses and singing Christmas Carols in the High Street. For many years traffic was stopped as pupils processed to Exeter Cathedral for an annual St Wilfrid's Day service every October.

Up until 1988 the school had been taught entirely by nuns, however, with increasing curriculum demands it was decided they were no longer able to fully run the school and so the Senior department became a separate school with its own head-teacher and financial control. The Junior department continued under the Sisters’ leadership for a while longer until by 1994 there were only two remaining Sisters: Sister Elsie (who died in 1997) and Reverend Mother Lillian (who died in 2004 at the age of 107) at which point the juniors rejoined the seniors and moved into the current site on St David's Hill.

Today the school still has senior and junior classes.

The current proprietor, Alexandra Macdonald-Dent, stepped down as headmistress in 2017, to be replaced by the current headmaster and former pupil, Ross Bovingdon.

== Academic environment ==
As standards of education were not so high in late Victorian times, the early curriculum was limited by the abilities of the Sisters teaching there. As standards improved and more subjects were introduced, the Sisters became trained as professional teachers and were joined by specialist teachers to cover the more demanding subjects. By the 1930s Science, Mathematics, History, R.E., Geography and Sports along with the original "three Rs" formed the school syllabus, and older pupils began to take external examinations.

Today the school offers a wide range of academic subjects including separate sciences from year 7, and numerous extra-curricular activities including sports and creative arts. 'SWOP', St Wilfrid's Outdoor Pursuits, provides opportunities for the students to go on walks and outdoor activities with the school, and take part in externally arranged challenges such as the Sidmouth Saunter. Students also take part in the Duke of Edinburgh Award Scheme or the Ten Tors weekend on Dartmoor.

== Academic standards ==
The school was inspected by Ofsted in October 2017; their report evaluated the school as being 'Good' in all areas (Overall Effectiveness; Effectiveness of leadership and Management; Quality of Teaching; Learning and Assessment; Personal Development, Behaviour and Welfare; Outcomes for pupils; Early Years provision). The report concluded that "Leaders have created a school community where relationships between staff and pupils are deeply rooted in mutual respect", and "pupils make strong progress from their different starting points. A large proportion of pupils arrive working below age-related expectations but they quickly start to catch up."

At Key Stage 1/2, pupils study Maths, English, French, Science, History, Geography, Drama, Music, Art, Home Economics, RE, PE, Games, ICT and PSHE/RSHE.

Key Stage 3 follows a similar pattern.

For Key Stage 4, the key subjects are English Language/Literature, Maths, French and Science. Choices include Media Studiesy, History, Art and PE.
