= George Robert Aberigh-Mackay =

British author and educationalist resident (1848–1881)

George Robert Aberigh-Mackay (25 July 1848 – 12 January 1881) was a British educationalist and writer resident in India during his short adult life.

== Biography ==
George Robert Aberigh-Mackay was the son of the Reverend James Aberigh-Mackay D.D., B.D. and his first wife Lucretia Livingston née Reed. He was educated privately in Scotland, and then at Magdalen College School, Oxford and St Catharine's College, Cambridge. Entering the Indian education department in the North-Western Provinces in 1870, he became professor of English literature in Delhi College in 1873, tutor to the Raja of Rutlam in 1876, and principal of the Rajkumar College at Indore in 1877. He was appointed fellow of Calcutta University in 1880.

He wrote a number of educational works, and extensive manuals giving first-hand data about the princely states and their rulers. He also wrote, mainly for The Pioneer newspaper, but also for other English and Indian papers, including letters in the Bombay Gazette under the nom de plume "The Political Orphan".

He is best known for his book Twenty-one Days in India (1878–1879), a satire upon Anglo-Indian society and modes of thought. This book gave promise of a successful literary career, but the author died at the age of thirty-three.

On 8 January 1881 he developed symptoms of tetanus after playing polo and tennis on the previous 2 days, and died on 12 January 1881 in Indore.

== Family ==
George Robert Aberigh-Mackay married Mary Ann Louisa Cherry on 13 October 1873 at Simla, Bengal, India; their children were:

1. Mary Livingston (Miss Patty) Aberigh-Mackay (1874–1952)
2. Frances Lilian Aberigh-Mackay (1875–?)
3. Beatrice Georgiana Aberigh-Mackay (1878–1948)
4. Katharine Madeline Aberigh-Mackay (1879–1945) married 1st Montague Tharp 2nd James Herbert Everett Evans.

== Works ==
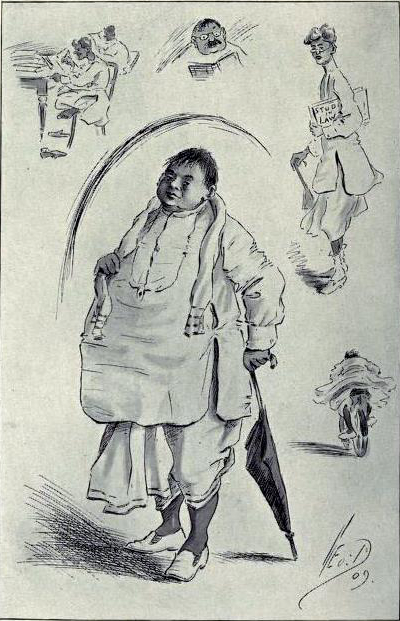
The Bengali Baboo. Twenty-One Days in India (1878–1879). The Teapot Series by George Aberigh-Mackay

- Handbook of Hindustan (1875)
- Notes on Western Turkistan (1875)
- A Manual of Indian Sport (1878)
- The Native Chiefs and Their States in 1877: A Manual of reference (1878)
- Twenty One Days in India serialised in Vanity Fair from 1878 to 1879
- The Chiefs of Central India (1879)
- Serious Reflections and Other Contributions (1881) - posthumous publication of Aberigh-Mackay's writings as "The Political Orphan"
