= Order of Lutheran Franciscans =

American Evangelical Lutheran religious order

The Order of Lutheran Franciscans (OLF) is a religious order affiliated with the Evangelical Lutheran Church in America (ELCA), founded in 2011 by the Rev. Chris Markert.

The Order is open to members of ELCA Lutheran congregations, married or single, lay or ordained. Members vow to live according to "the spirit and practice" of the Evangelical Counsels of Poverty, Chastity and Obedience, as interpreted by the Order. Individuals become members through a period of formation which includes postulancy, the novitiate, and ultimately, life profession. The Order also has an associate designation, called Friends of the Order.

The mission of the Order is to "passionately follow Jesus, rebuilding his Church, living lives of mutual care and accountability in harmony with the creeds and confessions of the Lutheran Church and both in the spirit and practice of the Evangelical Counsels, faithfully following the simple way of Saint Francis of Assisi."

The Order of Lutheran Franciscans is part of the larger family of Franciscans, ecumenical in its endeavors, seeking to work with other Franciscans in the rebuilding of Jesus' church, care of creation, and justice for the poor and marginalized.

In 2023, upon the vote of the ELCA Church Council, the Order of Lutheran Franciscans became a formal Independent Lutheran Organization (ILO) of the ELCA, making it the first official Lutheran religious order of a major denomination in North America.

== See also ==
- The Congregation of the Servants of Christ at Saint Augustine's House
