= Community of St. Clare =

The Community of St. Clare (OSC) is a Franciscan Anglican religious order of nuns, and part of the wider Franciscan movement within the Anglican Communion. The community, founded in 1950 and based at Freeland near Witney, Oxfordshire, England, is one of several associated with the Society of Saint Francis. It forms the 'Second Order' of the Anglican Franciscan movement, commonly known as the 'Poor Clares'. The community, in common with other Second Order Franciscan communities, is an enclosed and contemplative one, and the sisters provide for their own needs through a variety of activities. The sisters believe that their 'enclosed' life does not mean being 'shut in', but rather an opportunity to live and work together on one site in real community. The community runs a guest house and retreat centre, and the sisters engage in various works including sewing, painting, printing, and manufacturing altar breads.

Between 1975 and 1993 the order maintained a house at Stroud, New South Wales. Originally three sisters from the mother house at Freeland established the community at Stroud Rectory in response to an invitation from the then Bishop of Newcastle, Ian Shevill. The Monastery, dedicated to the Blessed Virgin Mary was built by community support of mud bricks and is an outstanding example of mud-brick building. In its later years the community at Stroud was headed by Sister Angela CSCl, formerly the artist Wendy Solling. Sister Angela led the community in several controversial directions involving it increasingly in environmental issues and the movement for the ordination of women. Between 1988 and 1992 the community opened its Stroud novitiate to male novices who were seeking an expression of Franciscan contemplative life. Although several enquiries were made by men at this time only one novice was admitted in May 1989, the Australian harpist Andrew Radclyffe, and the community functioned for a period as a double monastery. After the closure of the Stroud Monastery the Community of St Clare exists only at the original house near Oxford.
