= Church of Bangladesh Diocese of Barisal =

Diocese of Church of Bangladesh

Diocese of Barisal বরিশাল ধর্মপ্রদেশ

Church of Bangladesh
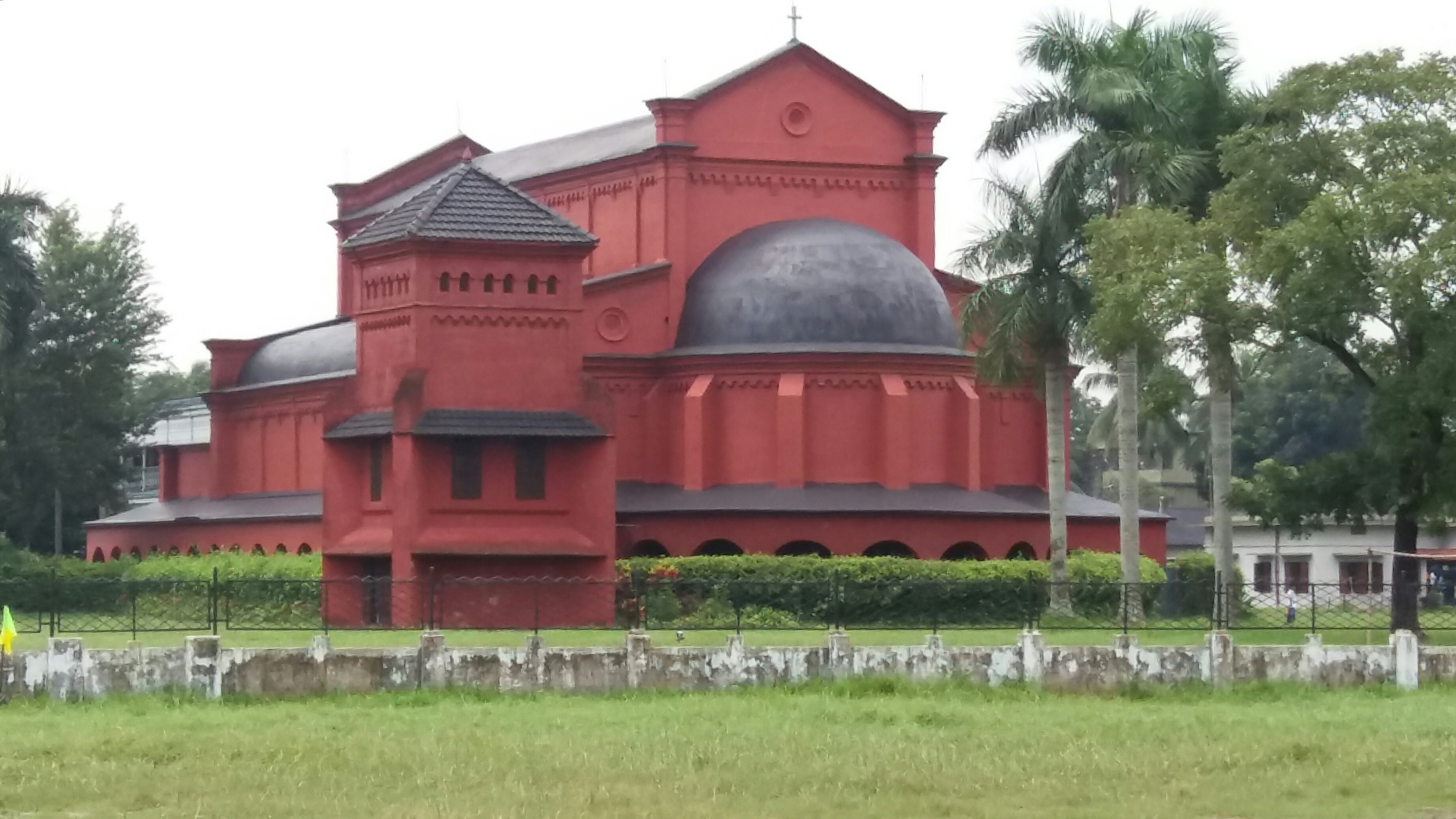
- Oxford Mission Epiphany Cathedral Church in Barisal

- Coat of Arms of Bishop of Barishal
- Incumbent: Shourabh Pholia
- Style: The Right Reverend

Location
- Country: Bangladesh
- Ecclesiastical province: Dhaka
- Metropolitan: Dhaka

Statistics
- Area: 15,214 km^{2} (5,874 sq mi)
- Parishes: 39
- Members: 7500 as of December, 2024

Information
- First holder: Shourabh Pholia
- Rite: Church of Bangladesh Book of Common Prayer
- Established: 2017
- Cathedral: Oxford Mission Church, Barisal

Current leadership
- Parent church: Church of Bangladesh
- Governance: Episcopal
- Bishop: Shourabh Pholia
- Metropolitan Archbishop: Samuel Sunil Mankhin
- Dean: Fr. Francis, SPB

The Church of Bangladesh Diocese of Barisal (also known as the Diocese of Barishal (Note: Transcribed bôrishal, or transliterated ISO 15919: bariśāl. Pronounced [boɾiʃal] or [bɔɾiʃal]. Spelling of the district name in Latin script was officially changed from Barisal to Barishal in April 2018.)) is a diocese of the Church of Bangladesh (a United Protestant denomination) that was erected in 2017 by separating the Jobarpar and Khulna deaneries from the Diocese of Dhaka. On 3 April 2017, Bishop Shourabh Pholia was consecrated as the first bishop of Barisal at Christ the King Church in Khalishpur. He was enthroned at the new diocese's cathedral, the Oxford Mission Church, in June 2017.

== List of bishops ==
1. Shourabh Pholia (2017–present)
