= Society of Saint Francis =

Religious order of Anglicans

The Society of Saint Francis (SSF) is an international Franciscan religious order within the Anglican Communion. It is the main recognised Anglican Franciscan order, but there are also other Franciscan orders in the Anglican Communion.

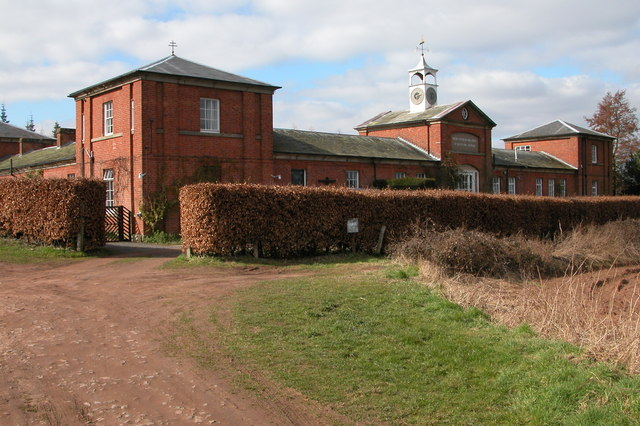
Glasshampton Monastery, England

== Background ==
Francis of Assisi and Clare of Assisi, the founders of the Franciscan movement, produced separate rules for three parallel orders, which still co-exist as parts of the Franciscan family today:

- The First Order were to be mendicant friars, embracing poverty as a gift from God and living the community life in the world and serving the poor.
- The Second Order were to be a parallel community of sisters living a more enclosed life of prayer and contemplation.
- The Third Order was to consist of brothers and sisters not living in community, nor under full monastic vows, but nevertheless taking simple promises and following a rule of life in the world.

Within Anglicanism, the Brothers of the First Order are called the Society of Saint Francis (SSF); the Sisters of the First Order are called the Community of Saint Francis (CSF); the Sisters of the Second Order are called the Community of Saint Clare (OSC); and the Brothers and Sisters of the Third Order are called the Third Order of the Society of Saint Francis (TSSF). Men and women who wish to associate themselves with the Society of Saint Francis without taking formal vows may become Companions (CompSSF).

== History ==
During the English Reformation all religious orders, including Franciscans, were banished from Britain. Not until the mid-nineteenth century were the first sisterhoods refounded in the Church of England, in response to the social needs of the time. Then came a revival of interest in Francis of Assisi. The Community of St Francis (CSF) was founded in 1905 with sisters living in poverty and working in the East End of London.

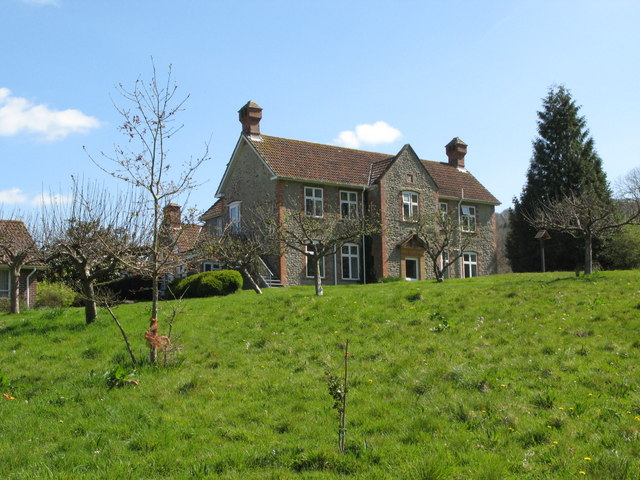
The Friary of St Francis, Hilfield

Shortly after World War I, the Revd Douglas Downes, an economics don at Oxford University, and a few friends gave practical expression to their sympathy with and concern for victims of the depression by going out onto the roads and sharing the life of the homeless men and boys, looking for work from town to town. In 1921, a Dorset landowner, Lord Sandwich, offered a small farm property (now Hilfield Friary), and here the group of friends was able to offer shelter to the exhausted wayfarers and others in temporary need of help.

Towards the end of the 1920s a number of religious groups had formed with a Franciscan spirit and to bear witness to the extreme poverty in England at the time. In 1934, Father Algy Robertson who had a clearer idea of forming a religious order, having been part of the Christa Seva Sangha in India and England, joined Brother Douglas (as he liked to be called). Together they held meetings with Father George Potter, who was vicar of the south London St Chrysostom's Church, Hill Street in Peckham. He had spent his time, since 1923, devoting himself to the lives of ordinary people and for the betterment of impoverished boys by creating the Brotherhood of the Holy Cross. After some wrangling and discussions between the three men, the Rule and Constitution of the Society of St Francis was read in June 1936, and they agreed to remove the individual names of the brotherhoods, to form a single union.

Gradually the little community took shape, modelling itself more consciously on the Franciscan tradition of prayer and study, as well as working with the poor. It started to look like a religious order in formal sense, with habits, a chapel, and regular worship. The Society of Saint Francis came into being, on the 9 October 1936, followed by the Third Order in the same year. The Second Order was created in 1950 with the establishment of the Community of Saint Clare in Freeland, Witney.

Before long, invitations came to establish centres in other places and at the start of World War II, there were houses in south London and Cambridge. After the war other centres were opened in Britain. Establishments overseas followed and the Society now has friaries in the United States, Brazil, Australia, New Zealand, Papua New Guinea, Costa Rica, and the Solomon Islands. Korea and Sri Lanka Other communities were made in (Germany), Italy, Africa and the West Indies.

The Daily Office SSF, the society's office book, was among the first to be fully updated with the Common Worship lectionary, so was used in the wider Anglican Communion. It provided the model for Morning and Evening Prayer in Common Worship. The creation of the office book is due to the dedication of the late Br Tristam SSF, and the revision editors: Br Colin Wilfred SSF, and Sr Joyce CSF.

== Structure ==
The Anglican Franciscan order comprises the Brothers of the First Order; the Sisters of the First Order; the Sisters of the Second Order; the Brothers and Sisters of the Third Order. Each part of the order is under the leadership of a minister general, currently Br Christopher John SSF (elected in 2017) for the Brothers of the First Order Sr Sue Berry CSF (elected in 2020) for the Sisters of the First Order, and John Hebenton TSSF (elected in 2017) for the Brothers and Sisters of the Third Order. Under the minister general the order is divided into provinces, each governed by a minister provincial. The Second Order, being enclosed, elect an abbess, and are currently active only in the United Kingdom. In 2012 the membership stood at approximately 200 members in community (combined First and Second Orders) and 3,000 dispersed members (Third Order).

=== First Order Brothers (SSF) ===
==== European Province ====
The European Province currently has the following houses of the order:

- Alnmouth, Northumberland, United Kingdom
- Birmingham, West Midlands, United Kingdom
- Glasshampton, Worcestershire, United Kingdom
- Hilfield, Dorset, United Kingdom
- Leeds, Yorkshire, United Kingdom
- Plaistow (Balaam Street), London, United Kingdom

==== Province of the Americas ====
The American Province currently has the following house:

- San Francisco, California, United States of America

==== Province of Divine Compassion ====
The Divine Compassion Province has the following houses of the order:

- Stroud, New South Wales, Australia
- Brisbane, Queensland, Australia
- Chuncheon, Korea
- Matale, Sri Lanka
- Hamilton, New Zealand – The Friary at Hamilton closed towards the end of 2016 bringing to an end after almost 50 years and the First Order's presence in NZ. (Anglican Communion News Service, 8 June 2016)

==== Province of the Solomon Islands ====
The Solomon Islands Province has the following houses of the order:

- Honiara, Guadalcanal (Patteson House)
- Honiara, Guadalcanal (Little Portion)
- Honiara, Guadalcanal (St Bonaventure Friary)
- Honiara, Guadalcanal (Michael Davis Friary)
- Auki, Malaita
- Kira Kira, Makira Ulawa
- Lata, Temotu

==== Papua New Guinea Province ====
The Papua New Guinea Province has the following houses of the order:

- Popondetta, Oro (St Mary of the Angels Friary)
- Popondetta, Oro (Geoffrey's Friary)
- Popondetta, Oro (Martyrs' House)
- Port Moresby
- Alotau, Milne Bay

=== First Order Sisters (CSF) ===
==== European Province ====
The European Province currently has the following houses of the order:

- Southwark in south London.
- Plaistow in east London.
- Metheringham, Lincolnshire.
- Birmingham, West Midlands.
- Leicester, Leicestershire.

==== American Province ====
The American Province, established in 1974, is currently located in a single house:

- San Francisco, California.

==== Korea ====
The semi-autonomous mission in Korea is not yet large enough to achieve provincial status, and the single convent at Gumi is part of the European Province, and under the authority of the European Minister Provincial.

=== Third Order (TSSF) ===
The Rule of the Third Order, Society of St. Francis consists of the Principles, the Constitution, and the form of Profession and Renewal. TSSF is divided into five provinces: Africa, Pacific, Asia-Pacific, Europe, and the Americas.

=== Companions (CompSSF) ===
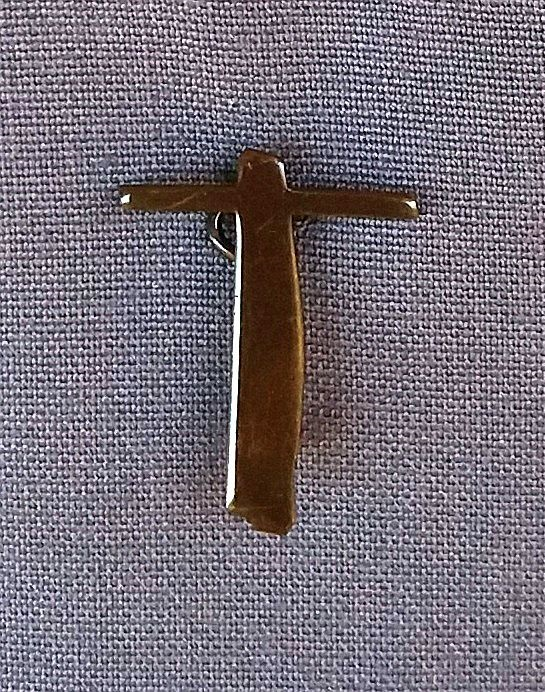
A CompSSF lapel badge

The Companions of the Society of St Francis (CompSSF) are individual men and women, lay and ordained, married and single, who wish to follow the spirituality of Francis of Assisi together with the Sisters and Brothers of the Society but without taking formal vows. Instead they undertake to pray for the Sisters and Brothers of the Society and support their work through giving alms.

Companions of the Society of St Francis are encouraged to pray and read the Bible each day, to aim at simplicity of life, and to help those in need. In some areas, CompSSF regularly meet for fellowship, prayer and mutual support. Meetings are not obligatory but are valuable in the exchange of ideas and thoughts of those following the same Christian commitment and service. In the European Province, CompSSF are currently led from Alnmouth Friary in Northumberland.

== See also ==
- Community of St. Francis
- Franciscan orders in the Anglican Communion
- Franciscan orders in Lutheranism
- Little Brothers of Francis
