= Order of Ecumenical Franciscans =

Interdenominational Christian organisation

The Order of Ecumenical Franciscans (OEF) is a group of men and women devoted to following the examples of Francis of Assisi and Clare of Assisi and their understanding of the Christian gospel: sharing a love for creation and for those who have been marginalized. Leadership is shared by a five member council.

An example of Christian ecumenism, the OEF opens its membership to Christians of many different denominations, including Catholics, Lutherans, Moravians, Anglicans, Methodists, Eastern Orthodox, Oriental Orthodox and Reformed Christians, among others.

The OEF understands its charism to include not only ecumenical efforts and the traditional emphases of the Franciscans in general, but also to help to develop relationships among the various Franciscan orders. Some reference books consider them one of a number of third orders of Saint Francis, other classify them separately.
