= Community of St. Francis =

Franciscan Anglican religious order of sisters

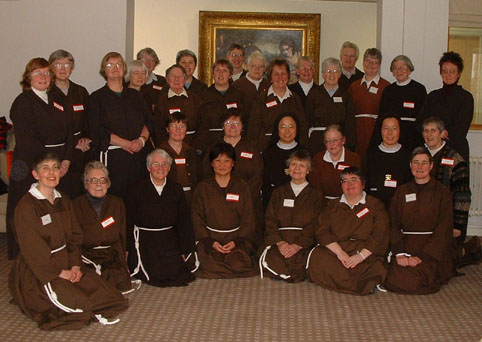
Sisters at centenary celebrations, 2005

The Community of St. Francis (CSF) is a Franciscan Anglican religious order of sisters founded in 1905, and is the oldest surviving Anglican Franciscan religious community. As First Order sisters, the CSF is an autonomous part of the Society of St. Francis (First Order brothers), which also includes the Order of St. Clare (Second Order sisters), and a Third Order of secular members living as a dispersed community. Living under a Franciscan Rule, the sisters' primary vocation is prayer, study, and work in the context of community life. Some sisters serve as priests, and others live a solitary life.

== History ==
The community was begun in 1905 by Sr Rosina Eleanor Rice, who left another Anglican religious order, the Society of the Sisters of Bethany, to found CSF. After a short period in Hull, the sisters moved to Dalston in East London in 1908, where they supported themselves by working in the parish, caring for the sick and dying, and running a laundry. In the late 1950s their house came under a compulsory purchase order, and in 1962 CSF moved to a house in the hamlet of Compton Durville, near Yeovil in Somerset. There they ran a nursing home for elderly women for some years, before changing their ministry to one of hospitality. CSF grew considerably, and new houses were founded in other parts of the country. In 2010 the sisters closed their house at Compton Durville.

== Structure ==
The order is under the leadership of a Minister General.

Under the Minister General the Order is divided into provinces, each governed by a Minister Provincial.

=== CSF European Province ===
The European Province currently has the following houses of the Order:

- St Alphege Clergy House at Southwark in south London.
- St Francis' House in Gloucester in Gloucestershire.

=== CSF American Province ===
The American Province, established in 1974, is currently located in a single house:

- St Francis' House at San Francisco in California.

=== CSF Korea ===
The semi-autonomous mission in Korea is not yet large enough to achieve provincial status, and the single convent at Gumi is part of the European Province, and under the authority of the European Minister Provincial.
