= Harriet Monsell =

Founder of a community of Anglican Augustinian nuns

Saint Harriet Monsell
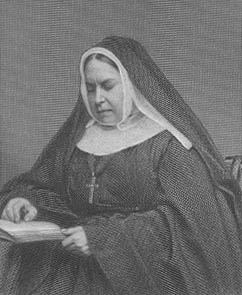
- Harriet O'Brien Monsell, Mother Superior, Community of St John Baptist

Mother Superior
- Born: 1811; Dromoland, County Clare, Ireland
- Died: 25 March 1883
- Venerated in: Anglican Communion
- Feast: 26 March

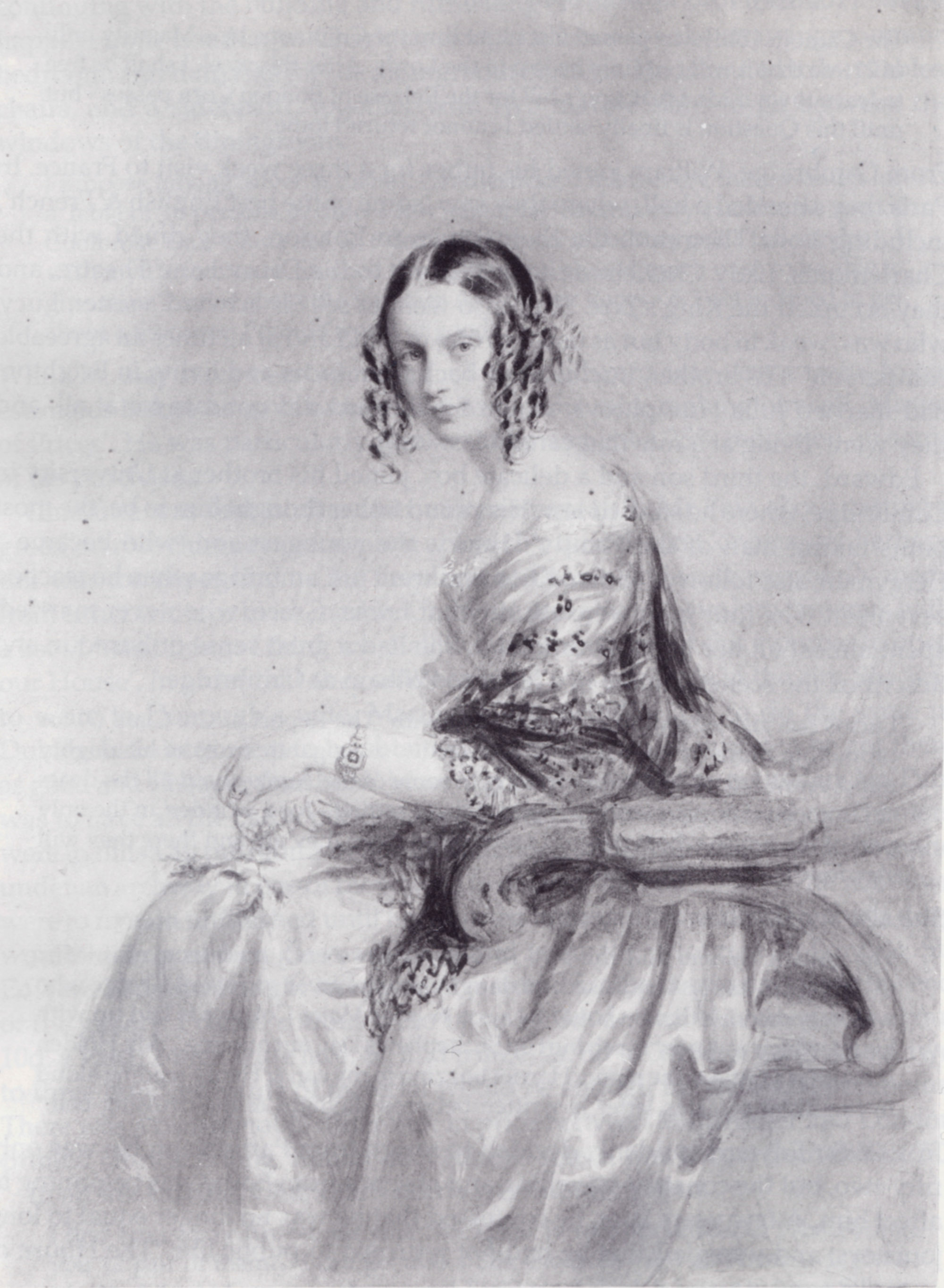
Harriet O'Brien Monsell, fourth daughter of Sir Edward O'Brien, 4th Baronet.

Harriet Monsell (1811 – 25 March 1883) is a canonised Anglican saint, who founded the Community of St John Baptist, an order of Augustinian nuns in the Church of England dedicated to social service, which by her death had expanded to numerous houses, including in India and the Americas. She is now remembered in the calendar of saints in some parts of the Anglican Communion on 26 March.

== Biography ==
Harriet O'Brien, born in 1811, was the third daughter and next-to-youngest of nine children born to one of Ireland's oldest families. Her father, Sir Edward O'Brien, 4th Baronet of Dromoland, continued family tradition by representing his county Clare in Parliament until 1826, when he relinquished the seat to his son for health reasons. Upon his death in 1837, his devoutly Anglican widow and daughters moved to London, then Dublin and other places. Ultimately, three of the four daughters (including Harriet) married Anglican clergymen. One brother later became Lord Inchiquin, inheriting a barony from his uncle, the Marquess of Thomond.

Harriet married Charles Monsell in 1839 while he was studying and receiving medical treatment at the University of Dublin, and they moved to Oxford the following year to complete his studies. He was the third son of the Archdeacon of Derry, Thomas Bewley Monsell, and upon ordination was licensed to his father's curacy and later received a prebendary at Limerick Cathedral. Due to his continued delicate health, much of their later married life was spent in Europe, including Naples.

== Career ==
After her husband's death in 1850, Harriet Monsell continued her affiliation with the Oxford Movement. She began working in Clewer near the garrison town of Windsor among former prostitutes and unwed mothers at a House of Mercy, which had been founded by Mrs Mariquita Tennant (1811-1860), a Spanish refugee and convert to Anglicanism (and clergyman's widow) several years earlier. Ill health had forced Mrs Tennant to retire to nearby Windsor, where she soon died. In 1852 Monsell moved to the village where her sister and brother-in-law, the Rev. Charles Amyand Harris, future bishop of Gibraltar, had moved.

The Rector of Clewer, Canon of Christ Church, Oxford Thomas Thellusson Carter was warden of the House of Mercy. Soon, Harriet Monsell professed religious vows with two other women. Initially they were called the Sisters of Mercy, but later changed their name to reflect their inspiration from John the Baptist's call to penitence. She thus became Mother Superior of the Community of St John Baptist, established on 30 November 1852, and one of the first Anglican religious orders since the Reformation. Because of their affiliation with the town of Clewer they are commonly called the 'Clewer Sisters'. The women lived according to a rule attributed to St Augustine of Hippo. During the new order's first five years, it expanded from assisting about thirty marginalised women to dedicating a building to serve about eighty. As the Community of St John Baptist, guided by Mother Harriet's energy, extensive correspondence and humour, the nuns extended their original mission to running about forty institutions, including mission houses in various parishes, as well as orphanages, schools and hospitals.

Mother Harriet retired to Folkestone in 1875 for health reasons, although she was occasionally able to visit the communities she founded. Biographers state she died on the morning of 25 March 1883, which was Easter Sunday that year. Since it is also the Feast of the Annunciation, her Feast Day is always celebrated the following day and occupies that date in the Calendar of the Church of England. By T. T. Carter's death in 1901, the Community of St John Baptist had more than 300 members in Great Britain, India and the United States.

The Community continues today, having moved its Oxford convent to a former Servite priory in Begbroke in 2001. In 2012 the Community moved to new purpose-built accommodation (Harriet Monsell House) at Ripon College, Cuddesdon in Oxfordshire. A new chapel, the Bishop Edward King Chapel, designed by Niall McLaughlin, and shortlisted for the 2013 Stirling Prize, has been built for them which is also used by the college students. Another affiliated community is in Mendham, New Jersey.

Harriet is remembered in the Church of England with a commemoration and on the Episcopal Church calendar on 26 March. Harriet is buried at Cheriton Road Cemetery, Folkestone, Kent
