= House of Mercy =

Former clerical institution in the United Kingdom

Houses of Mercy were Anglican institutions that operated from the mid-19th century to the mid-20th. They were to house "fallen women", a term used to imply female sexual promiscuity or work in prostitution. Many women entering were unmarried mothers, an unacceptable situation at that time.

== United Kingdom ==
=== England ===
- Bristol: This home was in Ashley Road, Bedminster.
- Stroud: The home was in the village of Bussage.
- Chester: The home was in Lache lane.
- Clewer: The Clewer House of Mercy was at Clewer near Windsor in the county of Berkshire. William Henry Hutchings was Warden from 1865 to 1884 when he became rector of Pickering. He was succeeded by Thomas Thellusson Carter.
- Great Maplestead: This was known as the 'St Alban's House of Mercy'.
- Horbury: This home, founded in 1859, was near Wakefield. The home celebrated its Golden jubilee in 1909.
- London: London Diocesan Penitentiary
- Lostwithiel: While chaplain of Bodmin Jail, the Rev. W. F. Everest founded a Cornish home.
- Newcastle upon Tyne: This was in Salters Road, Gosforth.

=== Wales ===
- St Davids: The home was located in the village of Lamphey.

== South Africa ==
- Cape Town: The home was located in Plein Street

== Notable donors ==
As an Anglican charity, the homes attracted many notable sponsors, such as

- Catherine Gladstone: She was the wife of four times Prime Minister, William Ewart Gladstone.
- The Hon Pascoe Charles Glyn: He was a partner in the banking firm of Messrs Glyn, Mills, Currie & co.
- Frances Selby Brodrick: She lived at Eaton Terrace, SW1.
- Fanny Thursby: The widow of The Rev William Ford Thursby, Rector of Bergh Apton.
