= St Stephen's College, Broadstairs =

Coordinates: 51.37186°N 1.44394°E

St Stephen's College
- England

Information
- Religious affiliation: Anglican
- Established: 1867
- Founder: Community of St John the Baptist
- Closed: 1991
- Gender: Girls
- Former pupils: Old St Stephenites
- Website: https://ststephensbroadstairs.org.uk/

St. Stephen's College was an educational establishment for girls run by the Community of St John Baptist, an Anglican convent of Augustinian nuns in Clewer (Windsor, Berkshire) from 1867. The college took gentlemen's daughters, clergymen's daughters (with a discount on fees), and student teachers.

St Stephen's moved to Folkestone in 1919, and evacuated to Taplow during World War II. The buildings in Folkestone were eventually acquired by Folkestone School for Girls. After the war St Stephen's College was re-established in Broadstairs. It closed in 1991.

== Timeline ==
1863	Thomas Thellusson Carter, Rector of Clewer, and Sister Emily of the neighbouring Anglican Community of St John Baptist found a ragged school for the poor in a cottage in Clewer Fields.
1867	Foundation stone of new Mission House in the parish of Clewer St Stephen is laid. The ragged school moves into its new premises in 1868.
1870	Following the Elementary Education Act 1870 which paves the way for free elementary education for all children, St. Stephen's College gradually transforms into a fee paying boarding school for the daughters of clergymen and gentlemen.
1919	The growing school moves into more spacious premises in Folkestone, Kent.
1940	The school is evacuated from Folkestone to Taplow Court in Buckinghamshire, the home of William Grenfell, 1st Baron Desborough, where it remains for the duration of the war.
1945	Following the death of Lord Desborough, Taplow Court is put up for sale. In 1946 the school moves to Broadstairs on the Isle of Thanet in Kent where it takes up residence in buildings vacated during the war by another independent school, North Foreland Lodge. The school buildings consist of the main school's north and south wings, a staff house, Wynstow, on the opposite side of North Foreland Road, connected to the main school via a tunnel, and another house behind this, St Christopher's (known as St Kitts) for the youngest boarders.
1964	The last of the Sisters of Clewer leave St Stephen's College and the first lay Headmistress, Megan Lowe takes charge of the school.
1967	The school celebrates its centenary with the building of a new school hall, named Clewer Hall in gratitude to the Sisters of Clewer.
1968	The school's sixth formers begin to travel daily to St Lawrence College, Ramsgate to join the boys there for their lessons. The St Stephen's College stables and riding school is established in the school grounds.
1970	St Stephen's College Preparatory School is established at North Foreland Court under the leadership of Miss Paget.
1977	From September 1977 'A' Level courses are taught at St Stephen's instead of at St Lawrence College.
1991	The school governors announce the decision that due to falling numbers on the school role and financial difficulties, the school is to close at the end of the 1991 summer term. After closure of the school, the buildings lie derelict for many years before being demolished to make way for a housing development. The development incorporates the Grade II listed wing of the main school building which has been converted into flats and is now known as St Stephen's Manor.

== Notable former pupils ==
- Mary English, mycologist and historian

== Literature ==
- Jenny Balston, The Story of St. Stephen's College (1994) ISBN 9780952334309
- Valerie Bonham, A Joyous Service: The Clewer Sisters and Their Work (2012) ISBN 9780957419704
