= Weale =

Weale may refer to:

== Person ==
- Adrian Weale
- Anne Weale
- Bobby Weale
- Charlotte Julia Weale (1829–1918), English religious philanthropist
- Chris Weale
- David Weale (born 1942), Canadian writer and historian
- Henry Weale
- Joanna Weale (born 1975), Welsh international lawn and indoor bowler
- John Weale (publisher) (1791–1862), English publisher
- John Stuart Weale (born 1962), Royal Navy officer
- Makenzie Weale (born 2002), Australian rugby league footballer
- Martin Weale
- Robert Weale
- Sam Weale
- Simon Weale
- Sydney Weale
- Tommy Weale
- William Henry James Weale, English art historian

== Location ==
Weale, Michigan, an unincorporated community on Saginaw Bay
