= London Diocesan Penitentiary =

The London Diocesan Penitentiary or House of Mercy was an institution housed in Park House, North Hill, Highgate, London. Set up in 1853, it sought to rehabilitate 'fallen women' and was initially run on behalf of the Diocese of London by a Warden, his wife and volunteers - two of those volunteers were Christina Rossetti and her elder sister Maria Francesca. The house was leased in 1855 and bought outright in 1861, with a plot in the western portion of Highgate Cemetery also bought in 1862 and between that date and 1909 ten of the women admitted to the institution were buried in it.

Some of the Penitentiary's records are held at the London Archives and others in the Royal Berkshire Archives among the records of the Community of St John Baptist, who ran the Penitentiary from 1900 until its closure in 1940.

== See also ==
- House of Mercy
