= Clarence James Hickman =

British-Canadian mycologist

Clarence James Hickman (1 April 1914 – 24 September 1980) was a British-Canadian mycologist. He is noteworthy for his discovery in 1940 that the oomycete species Phytophthora fragariae is the cause of the disease red stele (aka red core root disease) in strawberry plants.

== Early life ==
Hickman was born in Birmingham, UK.

== Education and career ==
At the University of Birmingham, Hickman graduated in botany with a B.Sc. in 1934, an M.Sc. in 1937, and a Ph.D. in 1936. As a postdoc he was from 1936 to 1938 an assistant in the Ministry of Agriculture Service. From 1938 to 1944 he was a research officer at the Plant Pathology Laboratory at Harpenden. At the University of Birmingham, he was a lecturer from 1944 to 1955 and a reader from 1955 to 1960.

For the British Mycological Society he served as the secretary from 1948 to 1952 and as the president for a one-year term from 1957 to 1958. In 1958 his presidential address gave an excellent summary review of the plant-damaging genus Phytophthora, including the biology of its survival and dispersal, the range of its plant hosts, and its physiological specializations.

In 1960 Hickman moved to Canada. In the botany department of the University of Western Ontario (UWO) he was a full professor from 1960 until he retired as professor emeritus. At UWO he was also of the head of botany department.

== Death ==
He died in London, Ontario.

== Selected publications ==
=== Articles ===
- Hickman, C.J.; Ashworth, D. (1943). "The occurrence of Botrytis spp. On onion leaves with special reference to B. squamosa". Transactions of the British Mycological Society. 26 (3–4): 153–157. doi:10.1016/S0007-1536(43)80022-X.
- Hickman, C.J.; English, Mary P. (1951). "Factors influencing the development of Red Core in strawberries". Transactions of the British Mycological Society. 34 (2): 223–236. doi:10.1016/S0007-1536(51)80012-3.
- Hickman, C.J.; English, Mary P. (1951). "The susceptibility of strawberry varieties to Red Core". Transactions of the British Mycological Society. 34 (3): 356–359. doi:10.1016/S0007-1536(51)80062-7.
- Bywater, Joan; Hickman, C.J. (1959). "A new variety of Phytophthora erythroseptica, which causes a soft rot of pea roots". Transactions of the British Mycological Society. 42 (4): 513–524. doi:10.1016/S0007-1536(59)80054-1.
- Hickman, C.J. (1962). "Physiologic races of Phytophthora fragariae". Annals of Applied Biology. 50: 95–103. doi:10.1111/j.1744-7348.1962.tb05990.x.
- Hickman, C. J.; Ho, H. H. (1966). "Behaviour of Zoospores in Plant-Pathogenic Phycomycetes". Annual Review of Phytopathology. 4: 195–214. doi:10.1146/annurev.py.04.090166.001211. 1966
- Ho, H. H.; Hickman, C. J. (1967). "Asexual Reproduction and Behavior of Zoospores of Phytophthora megasperma var. sojae". Canadian Journal of Botany. 45 (11): 1963–1981. doi:10.1139/b67-215.
- Hickman, C. J. (1970). "Biology of Phytophthora Zoospores". Phytopathology. 60 (7): 1128. doi:10.1094/Phyto-60-1128.
- Tousson, T. A.; Bega, Robert V.; Nelson, Paul E., eds. (1970). "Some Factors Involved in the Accumulation of Phycomycete Zoospores on Plant Roots by Yung Chang-Ho and C. J. Hickman". Root Diseases and Soil-borne Pathogens. University of California Press. pp. 103–108. ISBN 9780520015821.
- Zentmyer, G. A.; Jefferson, Laura; Hickman, C. J.; Chang-Ho, Yung (1974). "Studies of Phytophthora citricola, Isolated from Persea americana". Mycologia. 66 (5): 830–845. doi:10.1080/00275514.1974.12019681. PMID 4437579.

=== Books ===
- Abercrombie, M.; Hickman, C. J.; Johnson, M. L. (5 July 2017). A Dictionary of Biology. ISBN 9781351535694.
