= Lankesteria (plant) =

Scientific classification
- Kingdom: Plantae
- Clade: Tracheophytes
- Clade: Angiosperms
- Clade: Eudicots
- Clade: Asterids
- Order: Lamiales
- Family: Acanthaceae
- Genus: Lankesteria; Lindl.

Genus of flowering plants

Lankesteria is a genus of flowering plants belonging to the family Acanthaceae.

Its native range is Tropical Africa and it is found in the countries of Benin, Cameroon, Central African Republic, Congo, Ethiopia, Gabon, Ghana, Guinea, Ivory Coast, Kenya, Liberia, Mozambique, Nigeria, Senegal, Sierra Leone, Sudan, Tanzania, Uganda and Zaïre.

The genus name of Lankesteria is in honour of Edwin Lankester (1814–1874), an English surgeon and naturalist who made a major contribution to the control of cholera in London. It was first described and published in Edwards's Bot. Reg. Vol.31 (Misc.) on page 86 in 1845.

== Known species ==
According to Kew:

- Lankesteria alba Lindau
- Lankesteria barteri Hook.f.
- Lankesteria brevior C.B.Clarke
- Lankesteria elegans (P.Beauv.) T.Anderson
- Lankesteria glandulosa Benoist
- Lankesteria hispida (Willd.) T.Anderson
- Lankesteria thyrsoidea S.Moore
