= Phoebe Lankester =

British botanist known for popular science writing (1825–1900)

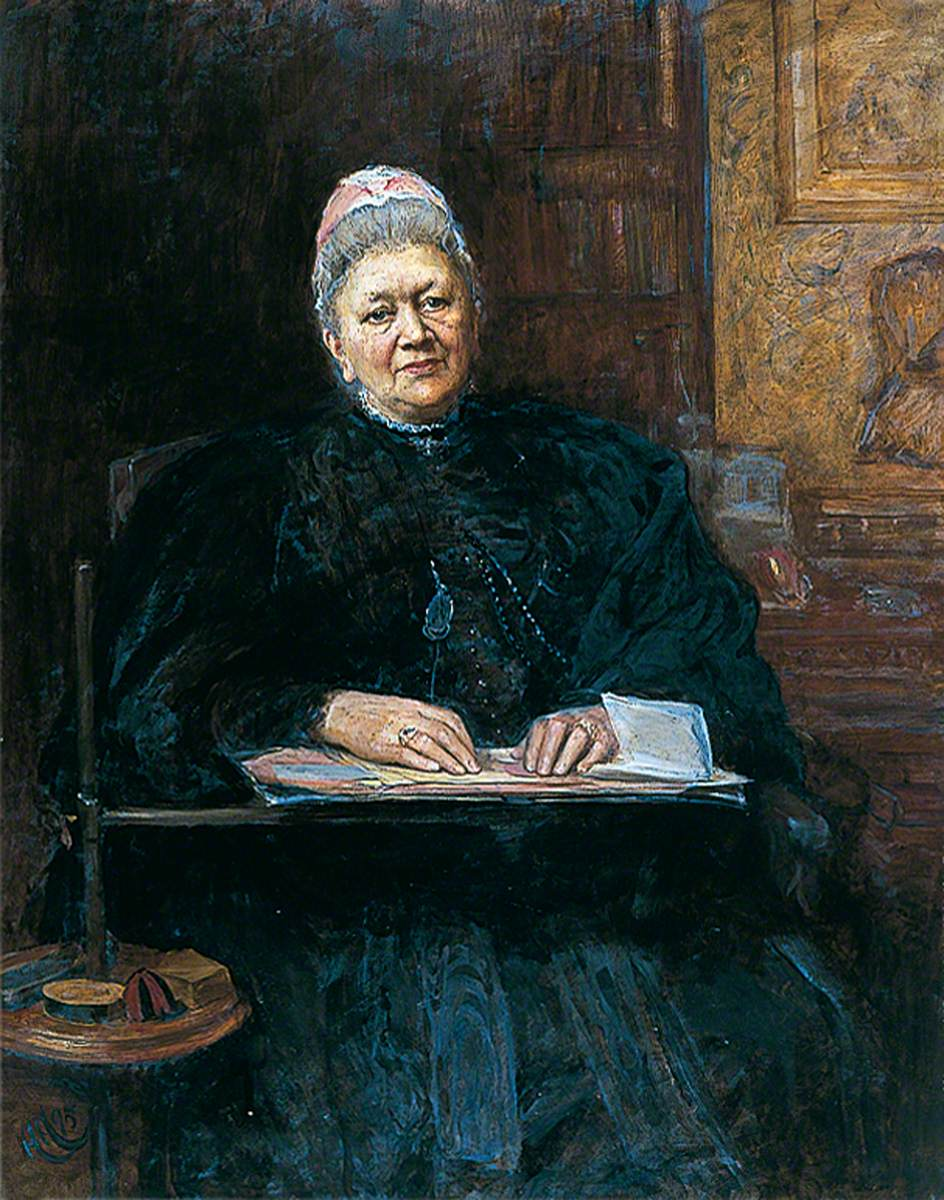
- Born: Phoebe Pope; 10 April 1825
- Died: 9 April 1900 (aged 74)
- Occupation: botanist

Phoebe Lankester (also Phebe Lankester, nee Pope; 10 April 1825 – 9 April 1900) was a British botanist known for her popular science writing, particularly on wildflowers, parasitic plants, and ferns. Her writing incorporated both technical, high-level text and writing accessible to the lay reader. She published several books, and wrote a syndicated column for more than twenty years, and lectured on science. Her husband was surgeon and naturalist Edwin Lankester, and her eldest son E. Ray Lankester became a zoologist.

== Family ==
She was born Phoebe Pope in Highbury to Samuel Pope, a former Manchester mill owner, and his wife, on 10 April 1825. She had one brother. In 1845, she married the naturalist Edwin Lankester, with whom she had eight children. Her eldest son E. Ray Lankester became a zoologist.

== Writing ==
Lankester published her books under the name Mrs. Lankester. Her books combined scientific rigour with interesting information about traditional medicinal uses of plants. She also lectured on science and for more than twenty years wrote a syndicated column on women's topics that ran in provincial newspapers. Her column was written under the name of 'Penelope'. Lankester's husband was a professor of New College in London. The Lankesters were known to have received Charles Darwin and Thomas Henry Huxley at their home, among other famous guests.

Lankester wrote a new section on popular plant knowledge for the third (1884) edition of English Botany, a publication that had illustrations by James Sowerby and other members of the Sowerby family.

Lankester died in London on 9 April 1900, predeceased by her husband, who died in 1874.

== Selected books ==
- A Plain and Easy Account of the British Ferns (1860)
- Wild Flowers Worth Notice (1879)
- Talks About Plants, Or, Early Lessons in Botany (1879)
- The National Thrift Reader (1880)
- British Ferns (1881)
