= Mariquita Tennant =

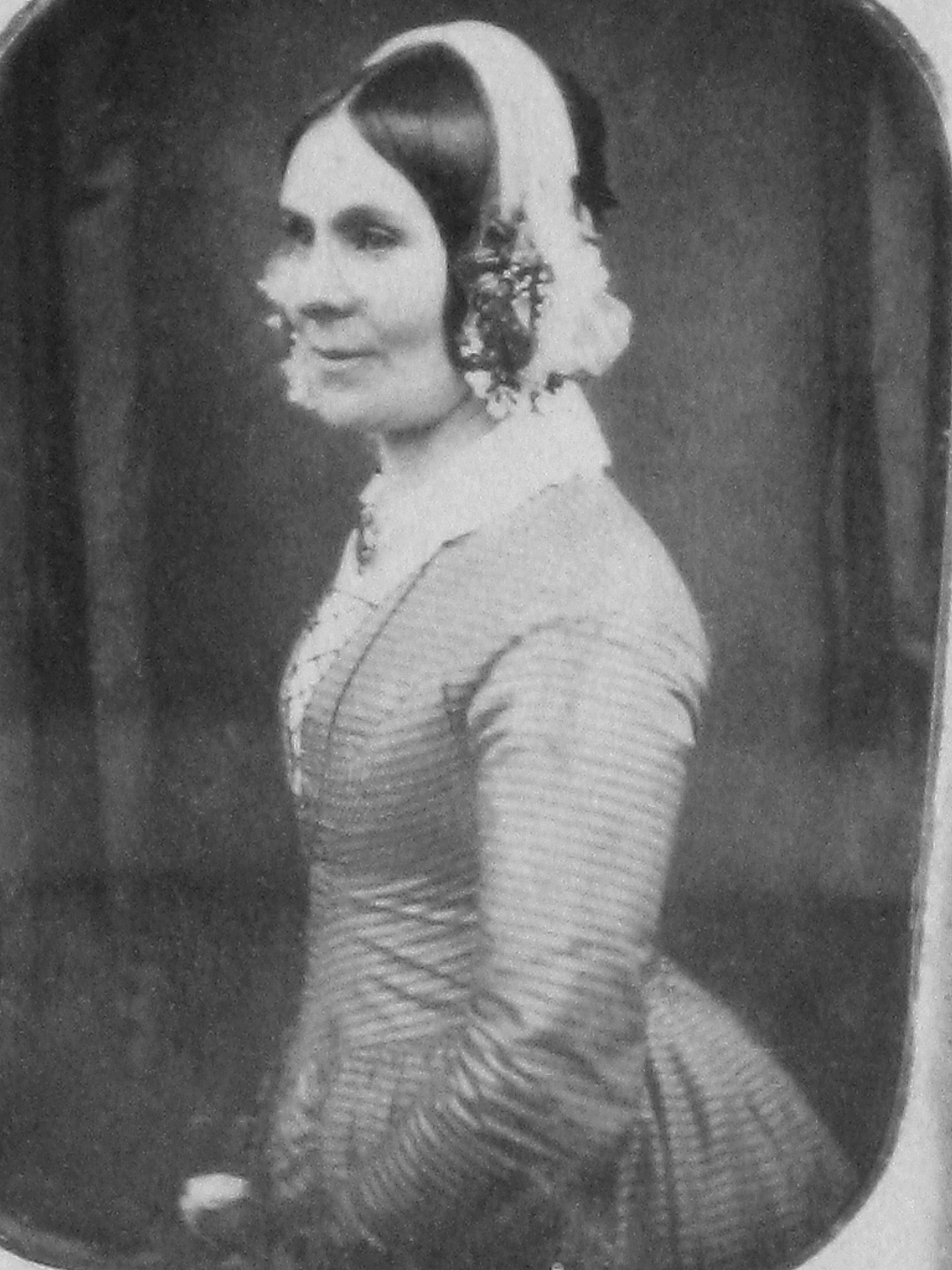
- Born: Mariquita Dorotea Francesca Eroles; 1 November 1811; Barcelona
- Died: 21 February 1860 (aged 48); Clewer
- Occupation: charity worker for abused women
- Spouses: David Reid; Robert Tennant

Mariquita Dorotea Francesca Tennant born Mariquita Dorotea Francesca Eroles (1 November 1811 – 21 February 1860) was a Spanish-born social reformer. She opened her house and started to help abused women around Windsor in England.

== Life ==
Tennant was born in Barcelona in 1811. She was the eldest daughter of Don Antonio Eroles and Sancho de Cal Tirs of the Pla de Sant Tirs. Her father was commander of the Miquelets of Organyà between 1821 and 1823 during the Trienio Liberal and, under the command of Francisco Espoz y Mina, who at the time, was Captain General of Catalonia, fought the royalist troops supporting Ferdinand VII of Spain. When the general was forced into exile in London in late 1823, Antonio Eroles followed him with his wife and four children: Mariquita, Isidro, Antonio and Rosa.

Her sister Rosa married Francis Beaufort Edgeworth who was related to the successful Irish novelist Maria Edgeworth. Tennant married in February 1833 a rich brewer named David Reid. The couples had both married in St Pancras in London and all four of them went to live in Florence. Her husband was epileptic and during a seizure, he fatally fell from a window just nine months after their marriage. Tennant was now a widow and soon a mother and the two of them returned to London where the Reid family cared for them and helped fund their return to Catalonia in 1834 where she studied law

She married Robert Tennant in 1838. He was a graduate of Cambridge University and had become an Anglican priest. They went to Florence where her new husband was minister of the English Church and he died suddenly in July 1842.

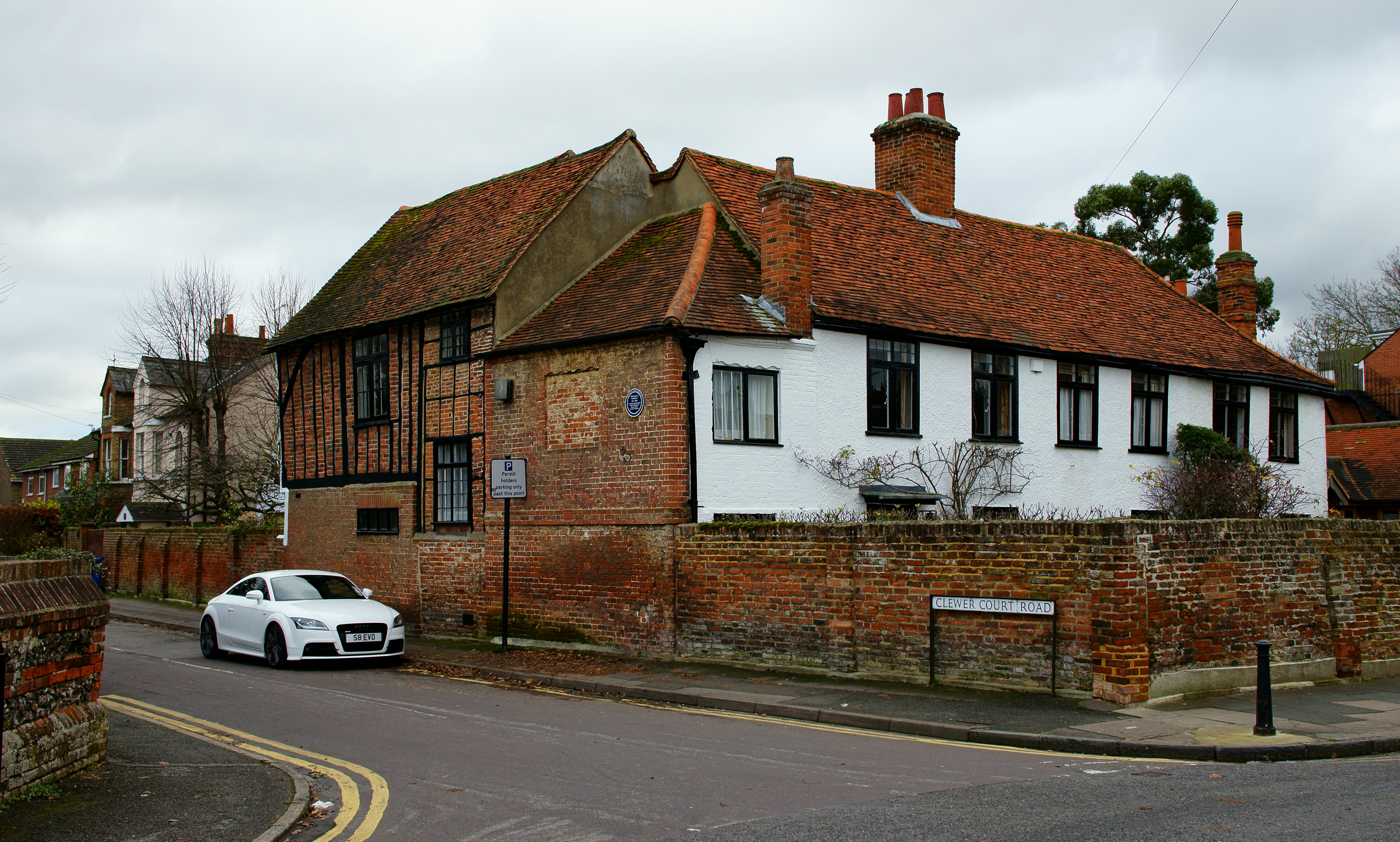
The Limes is now a listed building

Back in London, with the assistance of William Gladstone, she published a book of her late husband's sermons.

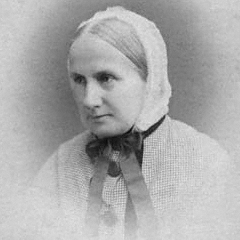
Charlotte Julia Weale by John Deane Hilton in 1882

She went to live in a large 16th-century mansion, 'The Limes', in Clewer near Windsor. At the end of 1848, she took in an abused woman, Marianne George, who had four children fathered by her step father. Encouraged by the Rector Thomas Thellusson Carter, she offered to take in more 'helpless women'. By the following June she had two more and soon there was twelve. These women could be unruly so Tennant took in various offers of help. However she could be a difficult person and none of her helpers stayed very long, although Charlotte Julia Weale stayed there for six months. Weale was a great help and in their spare time she documented not only the lives of the women they took in but Tennant as well. She recorded the daily routine and correspondence with supporters like Gladstone. Tennant was not a fluent English speaker but she was ambitious. Tennant called Weale Sister Dorotea and she had plans to establish a religious order, but Tennant eccentric behaviour attracted no novices. Weale returned to her home in Dorset, but she continued to support the work by employing women from 'The Limes' as servants at Whitchurch Canonicorum.

Tennant worked hard but by February 1851 she could work no more and she resigned.

Beginning in 1854, she lived in a Windsor flat and there was a pickup office near pubs.

She maintained contact with her sister Rosa and her six children living in Edgeworthstown, Ireland, and in the summer of 1858 she attended a tribute party to William Edgeworth, organised by Edgeworthstown tenants after being wounded in the Indian Rebellion of 1857.

== Death and legacy ==
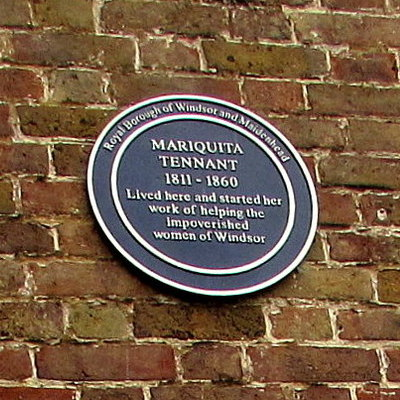
Her blue plaque

In February 1860 Tennant died in Clewer and she was buried in the St Mary's Church graveyard. Her social work in Clewer was continued by the Community of St John Baptist, the 'Clewer Sisters'.

On 21 November 2005 the mayor of Windsor and Maidenhead placed on The Limes a blue plaque in her honour which reads: 'Marquita Tennant lived here and started her work to help the poor women of Windsor'.
