= Phytophthora fragariae =

Species of single-celled organism

Red stele
- Common names: Lanarkshire disease
- Causal agents: Phytophthora fragariae
- Hosts: Strawberry,
- EPPO Code: PHYTFR

Phytophthora fragariae

Scientific classification
- Domain: Eukaryota
- Clade: Sar
- Clade: Stramenopiles
- Division: Oomycota
- Class: Peronosporomycetes
- Order: Peronosporales
- Family: Peronosporaceae
- Genus: Phytophthora
- Species: P. fragariae

Binomial name
- Phytophthora fragariae Hickman, (1940)

Phytophthora fragariae is a fungus-like (oomycete) plant pathogen that causes red stele, otherwise known as Lanarkshire disease, in strawberries. Symptoms of red stele can include a red core in the roots, wilting of leaves, reduced flowering, stunting, and bitter fruit. The pathogen is spread via zoospores swimming through water present in the soil, released from sporangia.

== Hosts and symptoms ==
A scientist thought at first that there were 2 varieties of Phytophthora fragariae: P. fragariae var. fragariae, which refers to the pathogen that attacks strawberries, and P. fragariae var. rubi, which refers to the variety that is the raspberry pathogen. Recently, the latter is considered a distinct species, P. rubi.

The oomycete does not infect tomato, apple, potato, turnip, cauliflower, chickweed, groundsel, or corn spurry. In 1958, it was reported that there was a race of P. fragariae var. fragariae that infected loganberries. Other plants have been reported to be susceptible to P. fragariae, and they include some Potentilla species, rosaceous plants, and Rubus parviflorus. It is P. fragariae var. fragariae and P. fragariae var. rubi that attract the most attention and are the most heavily researched.

The Phytophthora pathogens in strawberry and raspberry are similar in many ways morphologically, culturally, and molecularly, but are different in growth. Nonetheless, they are both variations of the pathogen P. fragariae. Recent research, however, suggests that these two variations may not have been as similar as once perceived. A study done to genetically map these pathogens revealed such a difference in the genome of these two variations, they likely could be considered two completely different species. This research has yet to make any changes to the present day cytology and taxonomy of this pathogen.

There are different races of P. fragariae, that occur within each form (e.g. var. fragariae, var. rubi) that attack only certain host plant cultivars. Depending on the location, there are anywhere from 5 to 18 different races that have been found to infect strawberries. However, there is not currently an international system to classify the differences of these races.

Infected strawberry roots

The main target of this pathogen is the central vascular cylinder of the roots. The common symptom that gives P. fragariae the nickname of “red core rot” is the red discoloration of these roots. Due to the infection, the stele of the root turns a wine to brick red, and starts to decay and die from the tip upwards. Red color of the roots does not necessarily guarantee the presence of P. fragariae infection. The most dependable way to determine if a plant has P. fragariae is the presence of microscopic oospores. Another symptom of P. fragariae is badly rooted lateral roots, starting to turn a grey or brown color. Other roots are poorly developed. Root symptoms can be observed starting in late autumn, and young roots are particularly susceptible.

The symptoms on the above-ground parts of the plant generally do not begin to show until late spring and early summer. Overall, the plant ceases to grow, or is stunted in growth, and shows a decline in runner development. The younger plant leaves turn blue-green, and older leaves turn red or yellow. The plant will wilt and collapse. In some cases, not frequently, the plant will merely wilt and die before visible symptoms are able to develop above the ground. The plant may die before fruiting, but if there is fruit produced it will likely be small, deformed, or dry.

The activity of the oomycete ceases when the symptoms are developing in the aerial parts of the plant. This brings about the opportunity for secondary fungi and oomycetes to mask the original Phytophthora pathogen. These secondary organisms have been observed to be species of Pythium and less commonly Rhizoctonia and other Phytophthora.

The symptoms of P. fragariae var. rubi are best seen in the spring. These include small roots, reduction of number of roots, and change in color from white to dark. Removal of the bark will make apparent a reddish discoloration. Smaller roots will rot completely, and the plant itself will wilt. The foliage appears bronzed or a reddish-brown long before the expected autumn timeframe. There are no fresh or new canes produced, and young canes wilt. Some fruiting canes will not break bud or will wilt and dry out. There may be blackish or purple lesions at the base of the plant.

Although not extremely common, the use of PCR to detect this disease is also another diagnostic tool. Specifically, PCR was studied for the detection of P. fragariae var. rubi. It was found the use of PCR with conventional Phytophthora primers yields more favorable results, is less time consuming, and is more convenient than PCR using specific var. rubi primers. Also, using PCR with primers DC1 and DC5 in the second round was also found to yield favorable results to detect P. fragariae var. rubi.

== Disease cycle ==
Phytophthora fragariae survives in the soil in the form of oospores. These oospores can survive for up to 4 years; there are some reports of spores remaining viable 13 – 15 years. The oospores germinate to form usually one sporangia. Sporangia germinate in the presence of water to release motile zoospores. The presence of water is important because the zoospores have no way to reach a host without swimming. The zoospores swim through the water in the soil to find roots where they encyst and form germination tubes to infect the plant. Goode 1956 discovered that early in the infection process the zoospores recognize not only the target – the root – but particular parts of its surface and adhere there. This usually occurs in the late autumn or early spring. Growth of the disease occurs mostly in the stem and root. Hyphae protrude out of the root and produce new, secondary sporangia. The secondary sporangia are usually produced in winter months and the process takes a few days. The sporangia are produced more quickly in cold temperatures. The new sporangia move through water in the soil to infect new plants.

The infection can be spread from field to field by unsanitized tools or equipment, floodwater, or any other activity that will move infected soil. Also, the replanting of infected nursery stock will spread the infection of P. fragariae.

== Environment ==
There are three main components of the environment that affect the effectiveness, speed, and ability of P. fragariae to infect: soil moisture, temperature, and pH. P. fragariae occurs frequently in wet, cool soils. Soil moisture has been proven to carry the greatest importance. Soils receiving plentiful steady water from rain or melting snow, as well as soils with poor water drainage that become waterlogged, produce the ideal conditions. In fact, there is a direct correlation between the soil moisture and the percentage of roots that were infected with P. fragariae. Temperature plays an important role in the environment needed for P. fragariae. The disease will grow in the temperature range from 5–25 °C (41–77 °F). However, as you approach the lower and higher ends of the temperature range, the disease develops and spreads more slowly. The optimum temperature range for P. fragariae is between 10–15 °C (50–59 °F). The effect of pH is more difficult to understand; oospores germinate best in soils with a higher pH. In contrast, soils with a lower pH are better suited for the mycelium and more mature parts of the oomycete.

== Management ==
The main form of spreading of P. fragariae is through infected material. Strict regulations in many countries have been instituted regarding the transportation and disposal. For instance, Norway requires an official statement saying that the location you are planting has not been known to host P. fragariae and that the plants you are planting show no symptoms. Fosetyl-aluminum and fungicides have been approved for use against P. fragariae. These chemicals, when applied in late autumn just before the infection of new roots, have been proven to be effective against var. fragariae, but not var. rubi. Fungicides containing phenylamides have been approved when applied in early spring or late autumn. Some strains with phenylamide resistance have been found and have proven to be problematic in Germany and North America. Resistant plants have been bred and are commercially available. The resistance may be race specific and usually used where one strain is predominant. Due to the importance of water in germination and infection, good drainage can help reduce the proliferation of the disease.

== Importance ==
P. fragariae was first observed in 1921 in Scotland. The actual infectious agent was not identified until 1940 by Clarence James Hickman. The disease was not found in the United States until 1935 when it was reported in eastern Illinois. Once discovered, a survey was done to identify other states that had the disease. It was found in Maryland, New Jersey, New York, and Michigan. Some farmers claimed that they had been observing the disease as early as 1925, so it is thought this disease could have developed at the same time as the Scottish outbreak. The disease is widespread and in many cases causes devastation to strawberry plants and strawberry production. Little about exact numbers has been found and may not have been recorded. Some information suggests that after a severe outbreak farmers could see yields as low as 1 metric ton per hectare (0.40 long ton/acre; 0.45 short ton/acre). On average, one uninfected hectare of strawberry plants would produce about 9 metric tons (8.9 long tons; 9.9 short tons) of strawberries. One estimate reported that farmers in Nova Scotia lost 78% of their strawberries in one season. They lost almost $1,500 Canadian per hectare ($610/acre). The disease is extremely devastating to raspberries as well. Raspberry plantations are huge capital investments that can take 10 to 15 years of production to earn back the initial investment. This disease can wipe out entire plantations in only a few years, effectively ruining a starting raspberry farm. P. fragariae is important wherever strawberries and raspberries are grown and where conditions are ideal. The countries it affects most are the U.S., China, Belgium, France, Germany, Italy, Netherlands, Russia, Switzerland, Norway, Finland, and the UK.
