= Community of the Companions of Jesus the Good Shepherd =

The Community of the Companions of Jesus the Good Shepherd (CJGS) is an Anglican religious order founded in 1920, part of the Church of England. It is currently based near Kidlington, Oxfordshire.

Originally, the sisters were teachers living alone or in small groups, but in 1943 a mother house was established in Devon under a monastic rule. Christian education continues to be the primary focus of the community's work, mainly through ministry training and spiritual direction.

The community has decreased in size and its novitiate is now closed. In 1996 the remaining sisters elected to move to Clewer and share accommodation with another Order of sisters, the Community of St John Baptist. The two Orders remain separate and distinct, but share the same priory house. In 2001 they moved to Begbroke, near Kidlington.
