= Phytophthora rubi =

Scientific classification
- Domain: Eukaryota
- Clade: Diaphoretickes
- Clade: SAR
- Clade: Stramenopiles
- Phylum: Oomycota
- Order: Peronosporales
- Family: Peronosporaceae
- Genus: Phytophthora
- Species: P. rubi

Binomial name
- Phytophthora rubi (W.F. Wilcox & J.M. Duncan) W.A.Man in 't Veld, (2007)

Species of single-celled organism

Phytophthora rubi is the principal cause of root rot in red raspberry. Originally classified as a variant of P. fragariae some now consider it a distinct species. This organism has been isolated from raspberries in Europe, North America, Chile, and many other countries around the world. It is best controlled through a combination of good management practices and use of resistant varieties. It is a significant cause of crop loss in poor draining soils.
