= Niall McLaughlin Architects =

Architectural firm in England

Níall McLaughlin Architects is an architectural firm in London, England. Irish architect, Níall McLaughlin established the practice in 1991. He has been described as "a favourite with Oxbridge clients"; as of 2022, McLaughlin has had commissions from 15 colleges at Oxford and Cambridge universities. In 2022, the practice won the Stirling Prize for excellence in architecture for the New Library at Magdalene College, Cambridge. In early 2026, McLaughlin was awarded the Royal Gold Medal by the Royal Institute of British Architects (RIBA), in recognition of his lifetime achievement in the field.

== Projects ==
- Radcliffe Observatory Quarter at Somerville College, Oxford (2011)
- Bishop Edward King Chapel at Ripon College Cuddesdon, Oxfordshire (2013)
- Darbishire Place housing, East London, for Peabody Trust (2015)
- Extension of London Academy of Music and Dramatic Art, Hammersmith, London (2017)
- Sultan Nazrin Shah Centre at Worcester College, Oxford (2018)
- Visitor centre for Auckland Castle, County Durham (2019)
- Catherine Hughes Building at Somerville College, Oxford (2019)
- New Library at Magdalene College, Cambridge (2021)

== Awards ==
Níall McLaughlin Architects has been shortlisted for the Stirling Prize on four occasions, winning in 2022:

- 2013 for Bishop Edward King Chapel, Ripon College Cuddesdon, Oxfordshire
- 2015 for Darbishire Place, East London
- 2018 for Sultan Nazrin Shah Centre, Worcester College, Oxford
- 2022 for The New Library, Magdalene College, Cambridge

== Recognition ==
- 2026 Royal Gold Medal
