= Stanton St Gabriel =

Civil parish in Dorset, England

Coordinates: 50.7282°N 2.8501°W

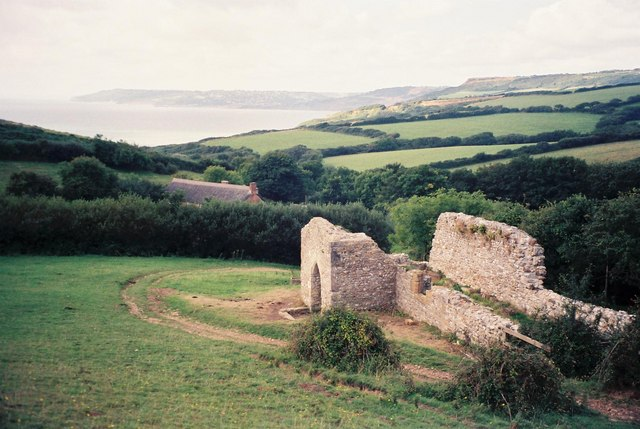
- Remains of parish church, Stanton St Gabriel

- Location within Dorset
- Population: 110
- OS grid reference: SY401924
- Unitary authority: Dorset
- Ceremonial county: Dorset
- Region: South West
- Country: England
- Sovereign state: United Kingdom
- Post town: Bridport
- Postcode district: DT6
- Police: Dorset
- Fire: Dorset and Wiltshire
- Ambulance: South Western
- UK Parliament: West Dorset

Stanton St Gabriel is a civil parish in west Dorset, England. It lies approximately midway between the towns of Lyme Regis and Bridport on the Jurassic Coast World Heritage Site, and includes within its boundary the highest cliff on the south coast of England, Golden Cap. In 2013 the estimated population of the parish was 110. The population in 1921 was 54.

In 1086 Stanton St Gabriel was described in the Domesday Book as "Stantone", a derivation from Old English meaning "farm on stoney ground". The old settlement had become virtually deserted by the 18th century; the inhabitants had moved either a short distance inland, where the new Dorchester to Exeter turnpike road had been rerouted, or to Bridport, where work was available in its ropewalks.

In 1856 the philanthropist and anti-catholic Charlotte Julia Weale of Whitchurch Canonicorum donated £200 to the parish church so that it could build be restored and have an extension. She was buried in the churchyard here in 1918 leaving money to build an Anglican church for the poor in Whitchurch.

Writing in 1906, Sir Frederick Treves described Stanton St Gabriel as "a village which was lost and forgotten centuries ago." He stated that all that remained of the settlement was "an ancient farmhouse, in a state of musty decay, and a cottage. Close to the farm and encumbered with its litter are the ruins of the village church."
