= Bishop Edward King Chapel =

Coordinates: 51.7241°N 1.1343°W

Edward King Chapel
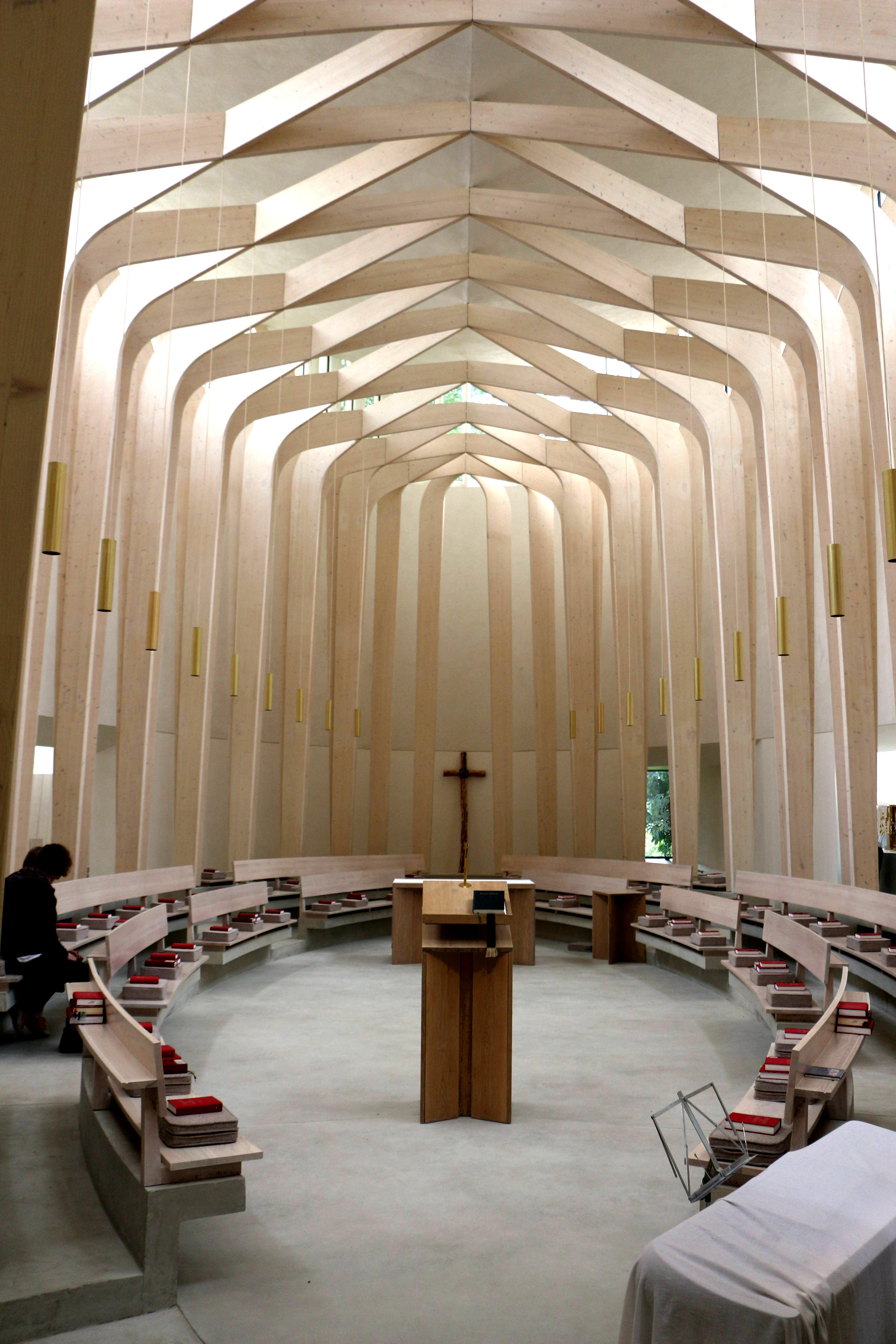
- Interior of chapel
- Edward King Chapel
- OS grid reference: SP 59892 03173
- Location: Ripon College Cuddesdon
- Country: England
- Denomination: Church of England
- Churchmanship: High Church
- Website: Ripon College Cuddesdon

Architecture
- Architect: Niall McLaughlin Architects
- Years built: 2013

Administration
- Province: Canterbury
- Diocese: Oxford
- Archdeaconry: Oxford
- Deanery: Aston and Cuddesdon

Bishop Edward King Chapel is the chapel of Ripon College Cuddesdon, a Church of England theological college near Oxford, and of the Sisters of the Communities of St John Baptist and the Good Shepherd, a community of Anglican nuns.

The chapel is dedicated to Edward King, who was Principal of Cuddesdon Theological College 1863–73 and Bishop of Lincoln 1885–1910.

Following an architectural design competition managed by RIBA Competitions the elliptical building designed by Niall McLaughlin Architects was selected. It was shortlisted and runner-up for the Stirling Prize in 2013 and shortlisted for the European Union Prize for Contemporary Architecture.
