= Edwin Lankester =

English surgeon and naturalist (1814-1874)

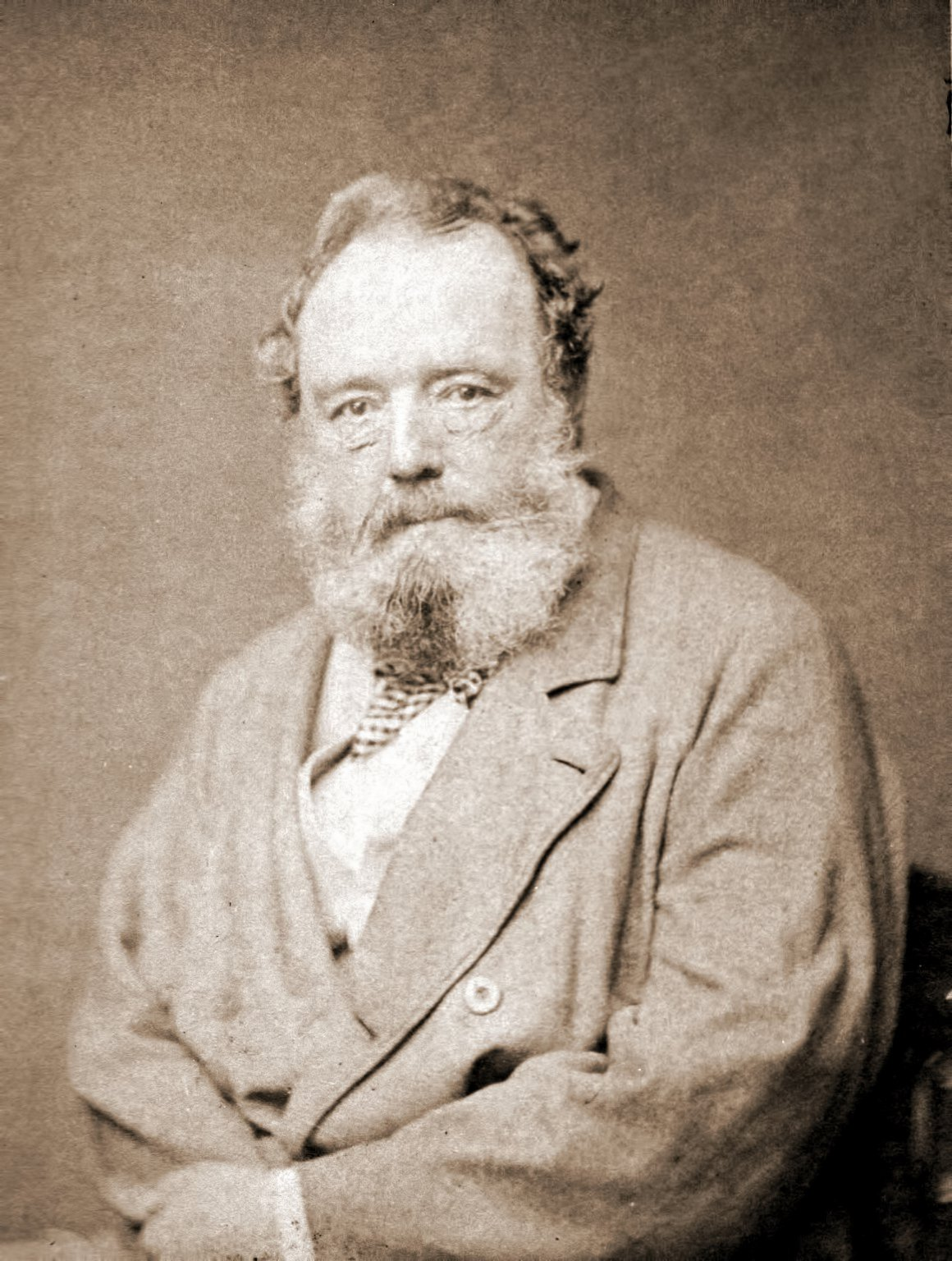
Edwin Lankester

Edwin Lankester FRS, FRMS, MRCS (23 April 1814 – 30 October 1874) was an English surgeon and naturalist who made a major contribution to the control of cholera in London: he was the first public analyst in England.

== Life ==
Edwin Lankester was born in 1814 in Melton near Woodbridge in Suffolk, to 'poor but clever parents' according to his son E. Ray Lankester (Lester 1995). His father was a builder.

Edwin married Phebe Pope in 1845, daughter of a former mill-owner. She was 19 at the time of marriage, became a botanist and microscopist, published books for children and wrote natural history articles. They had a total of eleven children of whom eight survived – four boys and four girls. Thomas Henry Huxley became a close friend of the family, and visited often. John Stevens Henslow, Darwin's tutor, was also a family friend. A born teacher, he introduced Edwin's son Ray to the delights of fossil collecting. Through his association with East Suffolk and his friendship with Henslow, Lankester became an early and active Honorary Member of the Ipswich Museum, of which his son Ray Lankester was afterwards President (1901–1929).

E. B. Ford, the ecological geneticist, said of Edwin: "Lankester was a close personal friend of Darwin's and was so deeply impressed by him that he was determined that one of his sons should become a great biologist, He named all three of his sons suitably: Forbes, Ray and Owen!" (p. 338 in Mayr and Provine). But, alas for this excellent story, Edwin had another son, his second, whom he named Rushton. Rushton emigrated to Java, married, and raised a family, the only one of Edwin's offspring to do so. The lack of productivity in this otherwise capable family was distinctly unusual at that time.

== Career ==
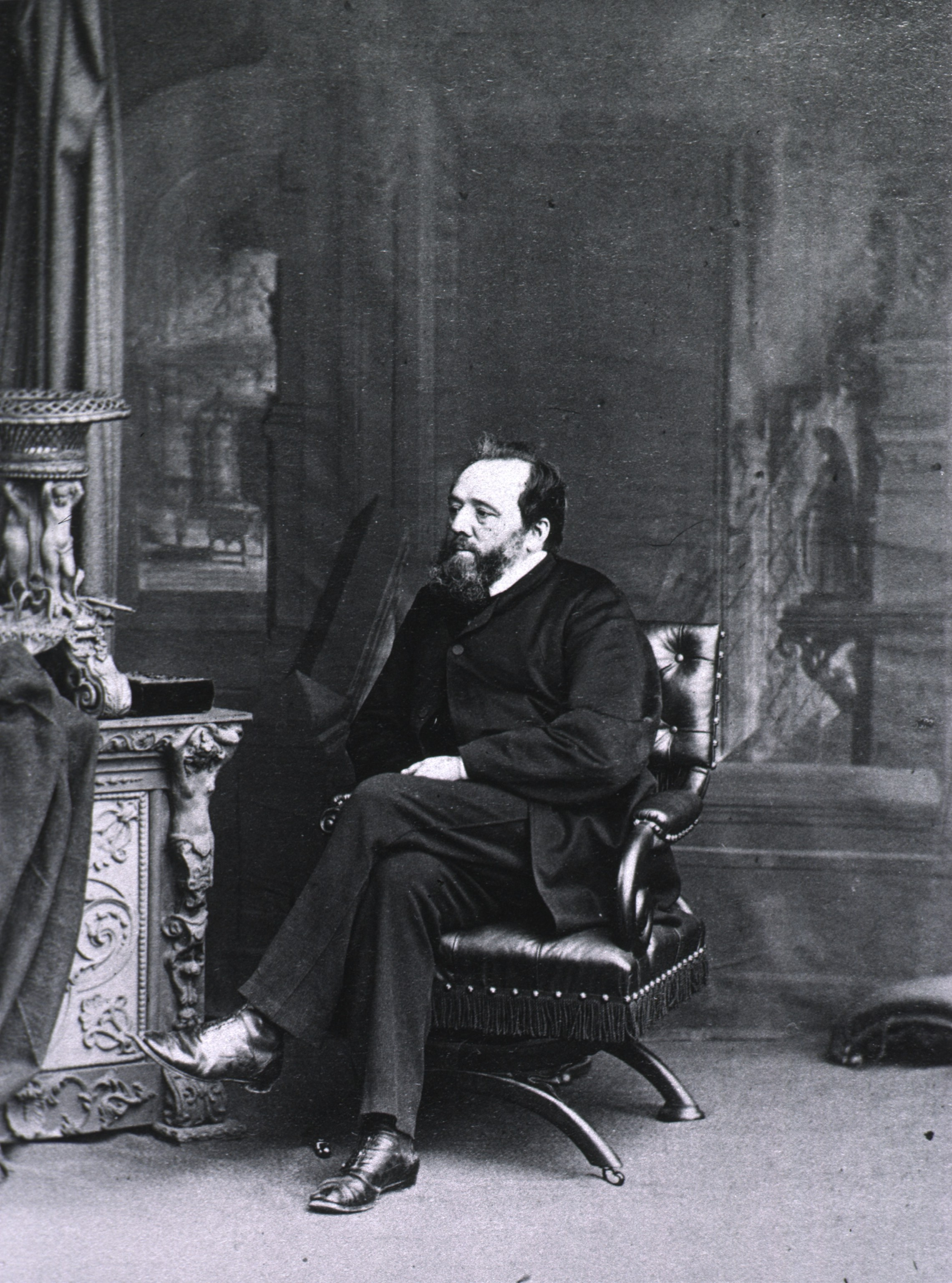
Lankester as a younger man

Apprenticed at first to a Mr. Ginney, a surgeon of Woodbridge, in 1832 he became Assistant to Thomas Spurgin of Saffron Walden. Spurgin raised £300 to enable Edwin to study medicine and science from 1834–7 at the new University College London. He attended lectures by John Lindley (botany) and Robert Edmund Grant (zoology) – to whose post Edwin's eldest son E. Ray Lankester succeeded in 1875. Grant had been one of Darwin's tutors at Edinburgh. Edwin's friends at UCL included William Jenner and William Benjamin Carpenter.

Edwin could not afford a complete degree course, so he qualified as an MRCS and Licentiate of the Society of Apothecaries. In 1837 he moved to Doncaster to become resident medical attendant and science tutor to the Woods family of Campsall Hall, recommended by Lindley. The Woods family were "indifferent to religion and fervent Owenites" as he mentioned in a letter home. Robert Owen actually visited Campsall Hall, and Lankester described the event in his diary.

In 1839 Lankester left the Woods and travelled to Heidelberg to take his M.D., which he got in six months. Back in London, he befriended Edward Forbes and Arthur Henfrey, the botanist. He practised medicine and wrote articles on botany, medicine and surgery for the Penny Cyclopaedia. He contributed to the Biographical Dictionary, and wrote for other journals. As time went by, he became ever more fully absorbed in natural history.

In 1841 his study of sulphur bacteria (then the 'glairine of sulphurous waters') was noteworthy, as was his microscopic examination of drinking water. His book the Aquavivarium (1856) had a great vogue. He co-founded the important Quarterly Journal of Microscopical Science (QJMS) in 1853, and co-edited it with George Busk, and later with his son Ray. Half-hours with the microscope (1857) was a best-seller, reprinted until 1918.

In 1845, botanist Lindl. named a genus of flowering plants from Tropical Africa, (belonging to the family Acanthaceae) as Lankesteria in his honour. In 1850 he was appointed professor of natural sciences at the newly founded New College London. He held this position until 1872.

Edwin Lankester was President of the British Association for 25 years, and the founder of the Biological Section of the BA. He was present at the infamous Wilberforce-Huxley encounter in 1860. He was the first Secretary of the Ray Society, with his wife as Assistant Secretary. In 1845 he was President of the Royal Microscopical Society, and that same year he was elected a Fellow of the Royal Society. Twenty years later he became the first President of the Quekett Microscopical Club.

In addition, Lankester also served as coroner for Central Middlesex, succeeding the first medically qualified coroner to take up the position, Dr Thomas Wakley, in 1862. Dr. Lankester, like his predecessor, contributed greatly to our knowledge on the social problem of infanticide in nineteenth century Britain by producing a series of 'statistically detailed Annual Reports' on the phenomenon.

== Cholera ==
The cause of London's cholera outbreaks had been identified by John Sutherland (1808–1891) and Dr John Snow (1813–1858; author of the famous map of water pumps near Broad Street). The matter was not decided until Lankester formed a committee to look into the latest outbreak. The Committee's report (1854) had sections written by Snow and the Reverend Henry Whitehead, a local curate. They reached the conclusion that the outbreak was attributable to the use of impure water from the well in Broad Street.

In 1866, twelve years after the event, Dr. Lankester wrote "The Board of Guardians met to consult what ought to be done. Of that meeting, the late Dr. Snow demanded an audience. He was admitted and gave it as his opinion that the pump in Broad Street, and that pump alone, was the cause of all the pestilence. He was not believed: not a member of his own profession, not an individual in the parish believed that Snow was right. But the pump was closed nevertheless and the plague was stayed."

Lankester later became the first Medical Officer of Health for the St. James's district, the area where the outbreak occurred. It still took years before the public authorities acted to ensure the purity of water supply; Snow had been dead for over 30 years when the Chief Medical Office of Health at last acknowledged that his work on the transmission of cholera was one of the most significant medical discoveries of the 19th century.

Lankester's interest in this (beyond simple humanity) came through his microscopical examination of water, which is still one of the standard tests of drinking water quality today.

== Selected publications ==
- Lankester, Edwin, ed. (1848). The Correspondence of John Ray: Consisting of Selections from the Philosophical Letters Published by Dr. Derham, and Original Letters of John Ray in the Collection of the British Museum. London: Ray Society. (also here at Biodiversity Heritage Library)

== Sources ==
- English, Mary P. Victorian Values: The Life and Times of Dr Edwin Lankester M.D., F.R.S. Biopress, Bristol 1990. ISBN 0-948737-14-X
- Lankester, Edwin. The Aquavivarium. 1856.
- Lankester, Edwin. Half-hours with the microscope. 1857.
- Lester, Joe E. Ray Lankester: the making of modern British biology (edited, with additions, by Peter J. Bowler). BSHS Monograph #9. 1995.
- Mayr, Ernst and Provine, William B. (eds) The evolutionary synthesis. Harvard 1980; 2nd ed 1998.
- Snow, John. On the mode of communication of Cholera. Churchill, London 1855.
- Vinten-Johansen, Peter et al. Cholera, chloroform, and the science of medicine: A Life of John Snow. Oxford 2003.
