= Ray Lankester =

British zoologist (1847-1929)

Sir E. Ray Lankester
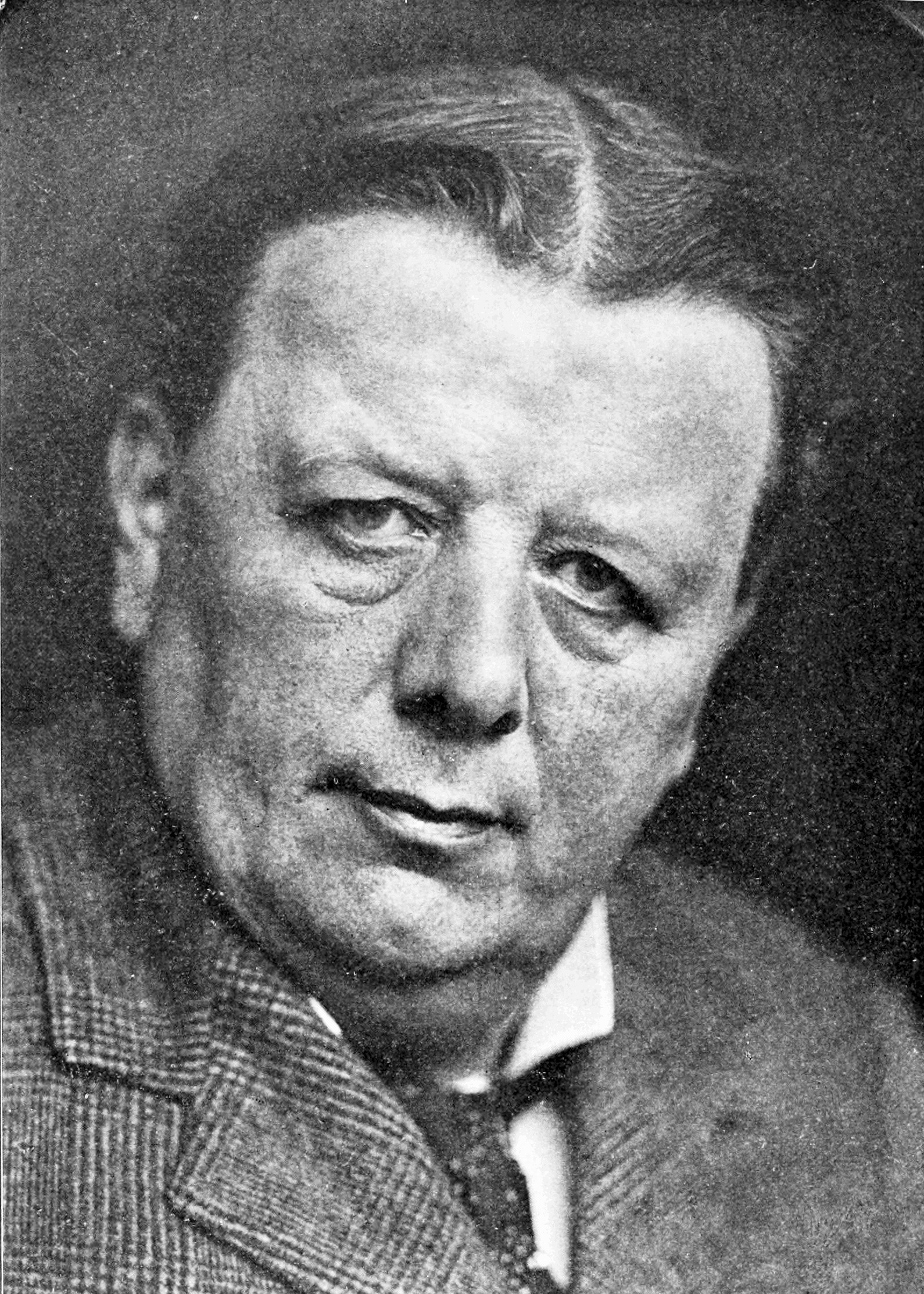
- Sir E. Ray Lankester in 1908
- Born: 15 May 1847; London, England
- Died: 13 August 1929 (aged 82); London, England
- Education: Downing College, Cambridge; Christ Church, Oxford
- Known for: Evolution, Rationalism
- Awards: Knight Bachelor (1906); Darwin-Wallace Medal (Silver, 1908); Copley Medal (1913); Linnean Medal (1920)
- Scientific career
- Fields: Zoology
- Workplaces: University College London; Oxford University; British Museum (Natural History)
- Author abbrev. (botany): Lank.

Sir Edwin Ray Lankester KCB FRS (15 May 1847 – 13 August 1929) was a British zoologist.

An invertebrate zoologist and evolutionary biologist, he held chairs at University College London and Oxford University. He was the third Director of the Natural History Museum, London, and was awarded the Copley Medal of the Royal Society.

== Life ==
Ray Lankester was born on 15 May 1847 on Burlington Street in London, the son of Edwin Lankester, a coroner and doctor-naturalist who helped eradicate cholera in London, and his wife, the botanist and author Phebe Lankester. Ray Lankester was probably named after the naturalist John Ray: his father had just edited the memorials of John Ray for the Ray Society.

In 1855 Ray went to boarding school at Leatherhead, and in 1858 to St Paul's School. His university education was at Downing College, Cambridge, and Christ Church, Oxford; he transferred from Downing, after five terms, at his parents' behest because Christ Church had better teaching in the form of the newly appointed George Rolleston.

Lankester achieved first-class honours in 1868. His education was rounded off by study visits to Vienna, Leipzig and Jena, and he did some work at the Stazione Zoologica at Naples. He took the examination to become a Fellow of Exeter College, Oxford, and studied under Thomas H. Huxley before taking his MA.

Lankester therefore had a far better education than most English biologists of the previous generation, such as Huxley, Wallace and Bates. Even so, it could be argued that the influence of his father Edwin and his friends were just as important. Huxley was a close friend of the family, and whilst still a child Ray met Hooker, Henfrey, Clifford, Gosse, Owen, Forbes, Carpenter, Lyell, Murchison, Henslow and Darwin.

He was a large man with a large presence, of warm human sympathies and in his childhood a great admirer of Abraham Lincoln. His interventions, responses and advocacies were often colourful and forceful, as befitted an admirer of Huxley, for whom he worked as a demonstrator when a young man. In his personal manner he was not so adept as Huxley, and he made enemies by his rudeness. Arthur Conan Doyle speculated that this damaged and limited the second half of his career.

Lankester appears, thinly disguised, in several novels. He is the model for Sir Roderick Dover in H. G. Wells' Marriage (Wells had been one of his students), and in Robert Briffault's Europa, which contains a portrait of Lankester, including his friendship with Karl Marx. (Lankester was one of the thirteen people at Marx's funeral.) He has also been suggested as the model for Professor Challenger in Doyle's The Lost World, but Doyle himself said that Challenger was based on a professor of physiology at the University of Edinburgh named William Rutherford.

Lankester never married. In 1895, he was charged with disorderly conduct and resisting arrest while in the company of a group of female prostitutes on the street, but was acquitted. It is incorrect, as has been alleged, that the charge concerned homosexual offences. He died in London on 13 August 1929.

A finely decorated memorial plaque to him can be seen at the Golders Green Crematorium, Hoop Lane, London.

== Career ==
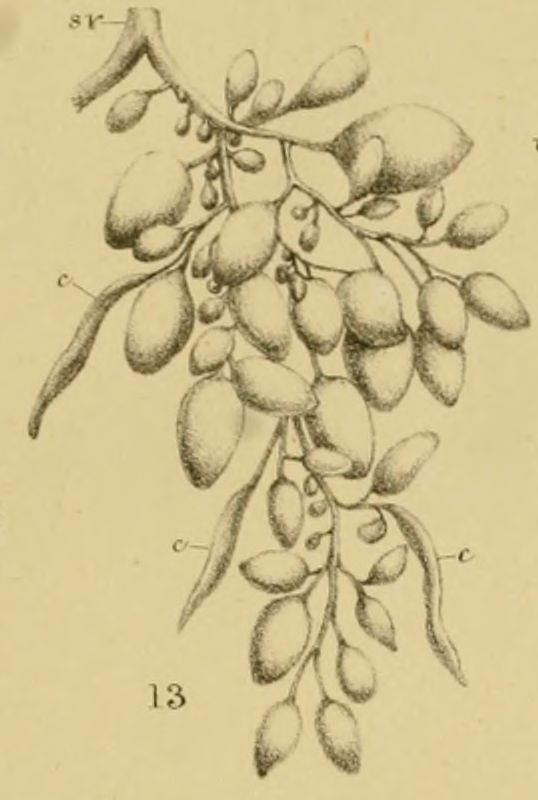
Portion of a ripe ovary of Sepia (cuttlefish) showing ova of various sizes and some empty capsules c, c. From Contributions to the developmental history of the Mollusca.

Lankester became a Fellow of Exeter College, Oxford, in 1873. He co-edited the Quarterly Journal of Microscopical Science which his father had founded. From 1869 until his death he edited this journal (jointly with his father, 1869–1871). He worked as one of Huxley's team at the new buildings in South Kensington, and after the death of Francis Balfour became Huxley's intended successor.

Lankester was appointed Jodrell Professor of Zoology and Comparative Anatomy and curator of what is now the Grant Museum of Zoology at University College London from 1874 to 1890, Linacre Professor of Comparative Anatomy at Merton College, Oxford, from 1891 to 1898, and director of the Natural History Museum from 1898 to 1907. He was a founder in 1884 of the Marine Biological Association and served as its second President between 1890 and 1929. Influential as teacher and writer on biological theories, comparative anatomy, and evolution, Lankester studied the protozoa, mollusca, and arthropoda. Lankester was elected an International Honorary Member of the American Academy of Arts and Sciences in 1902, and an International Member of both the United States National Academy of Sciences and the American Philosophical Society in 1903. He was knighted in 1907, awarded the Copley Medal of the Royal Society in 1913, and the Linnean Society of London's Darwin-Wallace Medal in 1908.

At University College London, one person who attended his class was Raphael Weldon (1860–1906). Another interesting student was Alfred Gibbs Bourne, who went on to hold senior positions in biology and education in the Indian Empire.

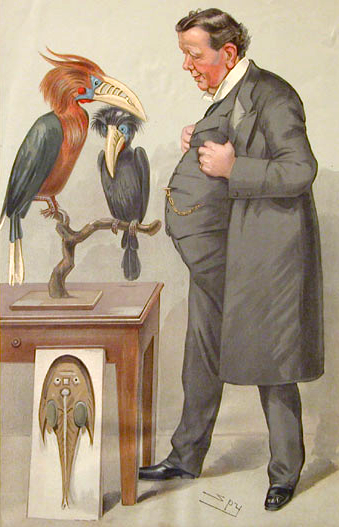
Ray Lankester by Leslie Ward, Vanity Fair 1905

After Huxley the most important influence on his thought was August Weismann, the German zoologist who rejected Lamarckism, and wholeheartedly advocated natural selection as the key force in evolution at a time when other biologists had doubts. Weismann's separation of germplasm (genetic material) from soma (somatic cells) was an idea which took many years before its significance was generally appreciated. Lankester was one of the first to see its importance: his full acceptance of selection came after reading Weismann's essays, some of which he translated into English.

Ernst Mayr said "It was Lankester who founded a school of selectionism at Oxford". Those he influenced (in addition to Weldon) included Edwin Stephen Goodrich (Linacre chair in zoology at Oxford 1921–1946) and (indirectly) Julian Huxley (the evolutionary synthesis). In turn their disciples, such as E. B. Ford (ecological genetics), Gavin de Beer (embryology and evolution), Charles Elton (ecology) and Alister Hardy (marine biology) held sway during the middle years of the 20th century.

Lankester was a comparative anatomist of the Huxley school, working mostly on invertebrates. He was also a voluminous writer on biology for the general readership; in this he followed the example of his old mentor, Huxley.

He published over 200 papers during his career. For an overview of his scientific work, see the obituary notice by Edwin S. Goodrich.

=== Invertebrates and degeneration ===
Lankester's books Developmental history of the Mollusca (1875) and Degeneration: a chapter in Darwinism (1880) established him as a leader in the study of invertebrate life histories. In Degeneration he adapted some ideas of Ernst Haeckel and Anton Dohrn (the founder and first director of the Stazione Zoologica, Naples). Connecting Dohrn's work with Darwinism, Lankester held that degeneration was one of three general avenues that evolution might take (the others being balance and elaboration). Degeneration was a suppression of form, "Any new set of conditions occurring to an animal which render its food and safety very easily attained, seem to lead to as a rule to Degeneration". Degeneration was well known in parasites, and Lankester gave several examples. In Sacculina, a genus of barnacles which is a parasite of crabs, the female is little more than "a sac of eggs, and absorbed nourishment from the juices of its host by root-like processes" (+ wood-engraved illustration). He called this degenerative evolutionary process in parasites retrogressive metamorphosis.

Lankester pointed out that retrograde metamorphosis could be seen in many species that were not, strictly speaking, degenerate. "Were it not for the recapitulative phases of the barnacle, we may doubt whether naturalists would ever have guessed it was a crustacean." The lizard Seps has limbs which are "ridiculously small", and Bipes, a burrowing lizard, possesses two stubby forelimbs, and rear limbs reduced to stumps. The Dibamidae are legless lizards of tropical forests who also adopt the burrowing habit. Snakes, which have evolved unique forms of locomotion, and are probably derived from lizards. Thus degeneration or retrogressive metamorphosis sometimes occurs as species adapt to changes in habit or way of life.

As evidence of degeneration, Lankester identifies the recapitulative development of the individual. This is the idea propagated by Ernst Haeckel as a source of evolutionary evidence (recapitulation theory). As antecedents of degeneration, Lankester lists:

1. Parasitism
2. Fixity or immobility (sessile habit)
3. Vegetative nutrition
4. Excessive reduction in size

He also considered the axolotl, a mole salamander, which can breed whilst still in its gilled larval form without maturing into a terrestrial adult. Lankester noted that this process could take the subsequent evolution of the race into a totally different and otherwise improbable direction. This idea, which Lankester called super-larvation, is now called neoteny.

Lankester extended the idea of degeneration to human societies, which carries little significance today, but it is a good example of a biological concept invading social science. Lankester and H. G. Wells used the idea as a basis for propaganda in favour of social and educational reform.

=== Trouble at the Museum ===
In Lankester's time the Natural History Museum had its own building in South Kensington, but in financial and administrative matters it was subordinate to the British Museum. Moreover, the Superintendent (= Director) of the NHM was the subordinate of the Principal Librarian of the BM, a fact which was bound to cause trouble since that august person was not a scientist. We can see that the conflict which took place was one aspect of the struggle undertaken, in their different ways, by Owen, Hooker, Huxley and Tyndall to emancipate science from enslavement by traditional forces.

There was trouble from the moment Lankester put forward his candidature for the office vacated by Sir William Flower, who was on the point of death. The Principal Librarian, Sir Edward Maunde Thompson, the palaeographer, was also the Secretary to the Trustees, and hence in a strong position to get his own way. There is good evidence that Thompson, an efficient and authoritarian figure, intended to take control of the whole Museum, including the Natural History departments. In the absence of Huxley, who had led most of the battles for over thirty years, it was left to the younger generation to struggle for the independence of science, Mitchell, Poulton, and Weldon were his main supporters, and together they lobbied the Trustees, the Government and in the press to get their point over. Finally Lankester was appointed instead of Lazarus Fletcher (a relative nonentity).

Lankester was appointed in 1898, and the outcome was inevitable. Eight years of conflict with Maunde Thompson followed, with Thompson constantly interfering in the affairs of the museum and obstructing Lankester's attempt to improve the museum. Lankester resigned in 1907, at the direction of Thompson, who had discovered a clause in the regulations which allowed him to call for the resignation of officials at the age of 60. Lazarus Fletcher was appointed in his stead. There was a vast clamour in the press, and from foreign zoologists protesting at the treatment of Lankester. That Lankester had some friends in high places was shown by the Archbishop of Canterbury offering him an enhanced pension, and the knighthood that was bestowed on him the next year.

The issues raised by this affair did not end there. Eventually the NHM gained, first, its administrative freedom, then finally there was a complete separation from the BM. Today the British Library, the British Museum and the Natural History Museum all occupy separate buildings, and have complete legal, administrative and financial independence from each other.

=== Rationalism ===
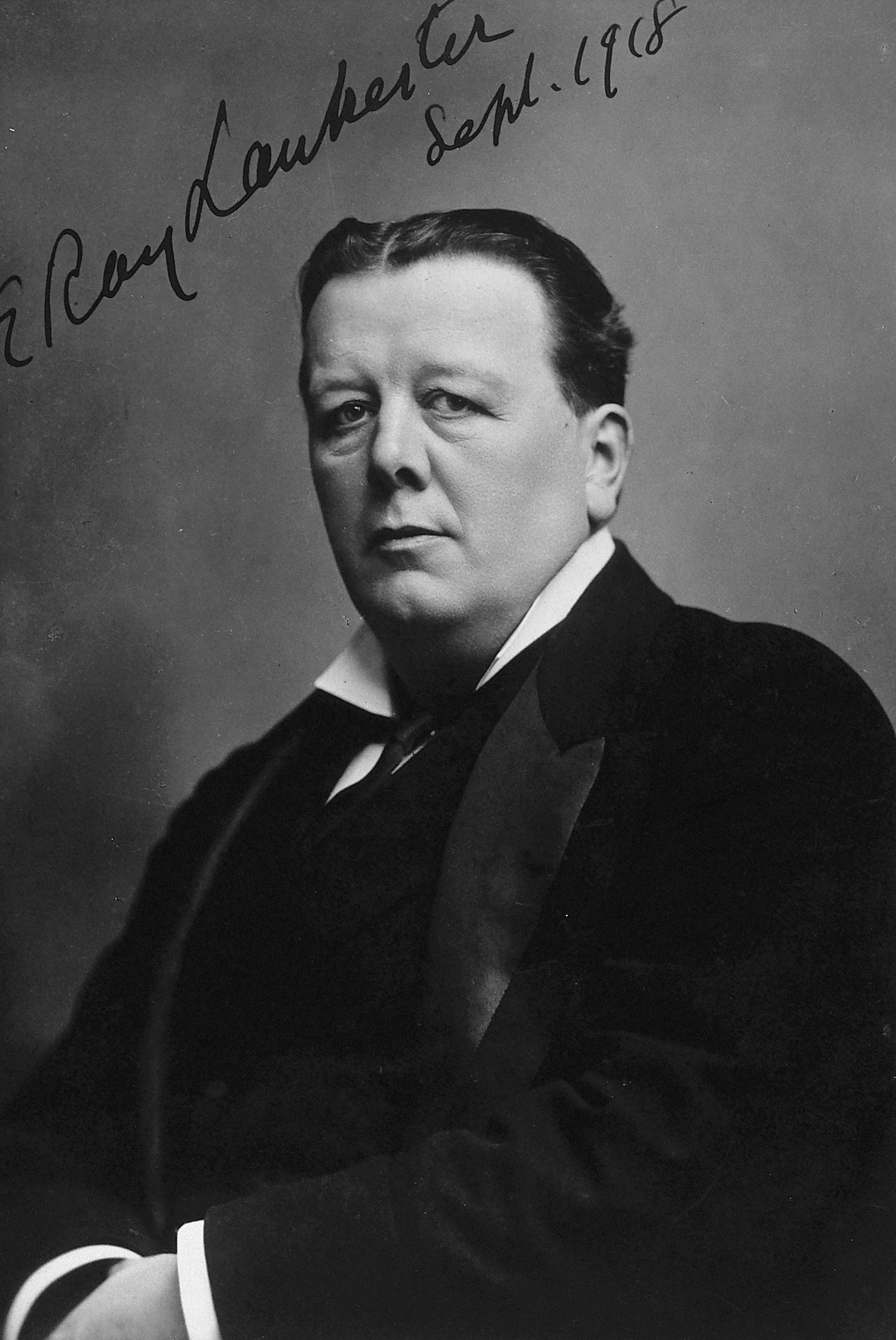
Sir Edwin Ray Lankester in 1918

Lankester had close family connections with Suffolk (the Woodbridge and Felixstowe area), and was an active member of the Rationalist group associated with the circle of Thomas Huxley, Samuel Laing and others. He was a friend of the Rationalist Edward Clodd of Aldeburgh. From 1901 to his death in 1929 he was Honorary President of the Ipswich Museum. He became convinced of the human workmanship of the (now unfavoured) 'Pre-palaeolithic' implements and rostro-carinates, and championed their cause at the Royal Society in 1910–1912. Through correspondence he became the scientific mentor of the Suffolk prehistorian James Reid Moir (1879–1944). He was a friend of Karl Marx in the latter's later years and was among the few persons present at his funeral.

Lankester was active in attempting to expose the frauds of Spiritualist mediums during the 1920s. He was an important writer of popular science, his weekly newspaper columns over many years being assembled and reprinted in a series of books entitled Science from an Easy Chair (first series, 1910; second series, 1912).

== Publications ==
His professional writings include the following:

- A Monograph of the Cephalaspidian Fishes (1870)
- On comparative longevity in man and the lower animals (1870)
- Contributions to the Developmental History of the Mollusca (1875)
- Notes on the embryology and classification of the Animal Kingdom: comprising a Revision of Speculations relative to the Origin and Significance of the Germ-layers Quarterly Journal of Microscopical Science Vol 17 Pages 399-454 (1877)
- Degeneration: a chapter in Darwinism. 1880 (1880)
- Limulus an Arachnid Quarterly Journal of Microscopical Science Vol 21 Pages 504-548 (1881)
- The Advancement of Science (1889), collected essays
- A Treatise on Zoology (1900–09), (editor)
  - Part 1, fascicle 1: Introduction and Protozoa (1909) by S.J. Hickson, J.J. Lister, F.W. Gamble, A. Willey, H.M. Woodcock, W.F.R. Weldon and E. Ray Lankester
  - Part 1, fasc. 2: Introduction and Protozoa (1903) by S.J. Hickson, J.J. Lister, F.W. Gamble, A. Willey, H.M. Woodcock, W.F.R. Weldon and E. Ray Lankester
  - Part 2: The Porifera and Coelentera (1900) by E.A. Minchin, G. Herbert Fowler and Gilbert C. Bourne ('Introduction' by E. Ray Lankester)
  - Part 3: The Echinoderma (1900) by F.A. Bather, J.W. Gregory and E.S. Goodrich
  - Part 4: The Platyhelmia, Mesozoa, and Nemertini (1901) by W. Blaxland Benham
  - Part 5: Mollusca (1906) by Paul Pelseneer
  - Part 7, fasc. 3: Appendiculata—Crustacea (1909) by W.T. Calman
  - Part 9, fasc. 1: Vertebrata Craniata (1909) by E.S. Goodrich
- Extinct Animals (1905)
- Nature and Man (1905) (Romanes Lecture for 1905)
- The Kingdom of Man (1907)
- Science from an Easy Chair (1910)
- Great and Small Things (1923)
- Fireside Science (1934)
- Lankester, R. (1925) Some diversions of a Naturalist, Methuen & Co, Ltd., London. pp. 220.

The Lankester Pamphlets are held at the National Marine Biological Library at the Marine Biological Association in Plymouth. These consist of 43 volumes of reprints, with an author index.

== Lectures ==
In 1903 he was invited to deliver the Royal Institution Christmas Lecture on Extinct Animals.

== Bibliography ==
- Lester, Joe E. (1995). Ray Lankester: the making of modern British biology (edited, with additions, by Peter J. Bowler). BSHS Monograph #9.

Academic offices
Preceded by Augustus Desiré Waller	Fullerian Professor of Physiology; 1898–1901	Succeeded by Allan Macfadyen
