= William Henry Hutchings =

William Henry Hutchings, D.D. (1835 in Exeter – 1912 in Pickering) was an Anglican priest, author and translator.

Hutchings was educated at Hertford College, Oxford; and ordained in 1859. After a curacy in Bedminster he was warden at the House of Mercy, Clewer. He then became Rector of Kirby Misperton, Yorkshire, and in 1884 he became rector of Pickering. He was archdeacon of Cleveland from 1897 to 1906.

He died on 7 January 1912.
