= Mary English (mycologist) =

British mycologist and historian

Mary P. English
- Born: Mary Phyllis English; 10 April 1919; Kuala Lumpur, Malaya
- Died: 11 October 2009 (aged 90); Stamford, Lincolnshire, England
- Education: St Stephen's College, Folkestone; King's College, London; University of London; University of Bristol
- Scientific career
- Fields: Medical mycology
- Workplaces: Bristol General Hospital; Bristol Royal Infirmary

Mary Phyllis English (10 April 1919 – 11 October 2009) was a British mycologist and historian. Her first career was in medical mycology, researching fungal infections such as tinea pedis (Athlete's foot) as well as zoonotic fungal transmissions. Following her retirement from the laboratory, she devoted her time to historical research; specialising in the history of science, social history and biographies of notable scientists.

== Early life and education ==
English was born on 10 April 1919 in Kuala Lumpur, Malaya. She was the eldest child of Marcus Claude English, a rubber planter, and Gladys Nellie English (née Cubitt). In 1926, she was sent to England to be educated. This happened first at home, and she was then educated at St Stephen's College, an all-girls independent school in Folkestone, Kent. She then spent a year studying at the Regent Street Polytechnic in London.

In 1937, English won a place at King's College, London to study botany. She was evacuated to Bristol following the outbreak of the Second World War and the London Blitz. Having continued her studies, she graduated with honours in 1941. While in Bristol, she took on fire-watching duties with her fellow students. She continued her studies on a part-time basis through the University of London, and graduated with a Master of Science (MSc) degree in mycology in 1943.

== Career ==
=== Scientific research ===
Because of the shortage of manpower caused by men fighting in the Second World War, "it became acceptable for women to take scientific jobs". After completing her undergraduate degree in 1941, English was posted to the War Agricultural Advisory Centre in Bristol as an agricultural chemist. In 1943, she moved to the East Malling Research Station in Kent, where she studied fungal diseases in apple orchards. She would spend the rest of her scientific career specialising in fungi.

Following the war, English held a number of short term positions. One was at British Drug Houses Ltd where she researched the fermentation of malt extract by Saccharomyces rouxii, an osmophilic yeast. This research led to her first publication; in the journal Nature in 1951. Others include making science films in London and as a fellow in mycology at the University of Birmingham.

In 1954, a new laboratory specializing in fungal diseases of humans was founded at the United Bristol Hospitals. English was chosen as the first head of the laboratory, thereby moving into medical mycology. She established a diagnostic service at Bristol General Hospital, which would go on to cover much of the south-west of England. Medicine and science was male dominated, but she made a conscious effort to be seen and used the same dining room and common room as the all-male medical staff. In 1970, she was awarded a Doctor of Science (DSc) degree by the University of Bristol for her research contributions: she was convinced to apply for the higher degree, in part, "to ensure that her medical colleagues would have to 'stop treating me like a laboratory technician'". Following her doctorate, she was awarded the tile of "consultant mycologist" by the United Bristol Hospitals. In 1972, the laboratory was absorbed into the pathology department of Bristol Royal Infirmary. She remained working at the laboratory until she retired from scientific research in 1980.

English made many advances in medical mycology. She made significant contributions to the epidemiology of tinea pedis ("athlete's foot"). She also researched the epidemiology of zoophilic dermatophytoses ("ringworm"); with the source of infections ranging from companion, farm, and through to wild animals. For example, she showed that trichophyton erinacei was common in British hedgehogs and spread to humans via their dogs. She also showed that microsporum persicolor, formally only known from human scalp infections, had originated from the short-tailed field vole and wood mouse.

=== Historian ===
In 1980, English published her first book Medical Mycology and retired from scientific research. She had developed an interest in Victorian biological science and its scientists, and so turned to a second career as a historian. She wrote biographies of Mordecai Cubitt Cooke (1987), a Victorian mycologist, and Edwin Lankester (1990), a Victorian naturalist. Her final book was titled Hospital Infection: from Miasmas to MRSA (2003), and was written with Graham Ayliffe: the book is a wide ranging history covering hospital-acquired infections and the development of medical microbiology and infection control.

== Personal life ==
English had a privileged upbringing, but she was exposed to the social deprivation that many in England had to live through during her time as an evacuee. This influenced her politics and she became a committed socialist. She welcomed the election of a Labour government in 1945 and the establishment of the National Health Service.

English never married nor had any children.

Having lived in a care home for a number of years, she died in Stamford, Lincolnshire, on 11 October 2009.

== Selected works ==
- English, Mary P. (1980). Medical Mycology. London: Edward Arnold Publishers. ISBN 0-7131-2795-3.
- English, Mary P. (1987). Mordecai Cubitt Cooke: Victorian Naturalist, Mycologist, Teacher and Eccentric. Bristol: Biopress Ltd. ISBN 978-0948737022.
- English, Mary P. (1990). Victorian Values: The Life and Times of Dr Edwin Lankester, M.D., F.RS. Bristol: Biopress Ltd. ISBN 9780948737145.
- Ayliffe, Graham A. J.; English, Mary P. (2003). Hospital infection: from Miasmas to MRSA. Cambridge: Cambridge University Press. ISBN 978-0521531788.
