= Charlotte Julia Weale =

English religious philanthropist

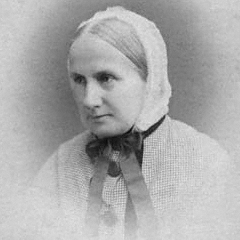
- by John Deane Hilton in 1882
- Born: 9 December 1829; Marylebone
- Died: 27 December 1918 (aged 89); Whitchurch Canonicorum
- Occupation: Philanthropist

Charlotte Julia Weale (9 December 1829 – 27 December 1918) was an English religious philanthropist. She assisted Mariquita Tennant helping abused women near Windsor and funded good causes. She was a keen Anglican who banned Catholics from entering her house.

== Life ==
Weale was born in Marylebone, London, in 1829, the daughter of James Weale who died when she was a child, and Susan de Vezian (died 1855). Her father was the librarian to John Baker Holroyd, 1st Earl of Sheffield and the family had a large book collection of their own. Weale had a sister, Henrietta, and her brother was William Henry James Weale. One of her godparents was the theologian Hugh James Rose. A lifelong Anglican, she was confirmed by Bishop Blomfield in 1846.

At the age of nineteen, she left her family and went to live in Whitchurch Canonicorum where she more or less remained for the rest of her life. She placed herself under the guidance of the theologian William Palmer. Palmer was an early leader of the Oxford Movement and an initial supporter of the Tracts for the Times.

She went to help Mariquita Tennant who lived in a large 16th century mansion, 'The Limes', in Clewer near Windsor. Mariquita Tennant had begun to take in 'helpless women'. By June 1849 she had twelve. These women could be unruly so she needed the help. However, Tennant herself could be a difficult person and none of her previous helpers had stayed very long, but Weale helped her for six months.

Weale was a great help and she documented not only the lives of the women they took in but Tennant's life as well. She recorded the daily routine and correspondence with supporters like William Gladstone. Tennant was not a fluent English speaker but she was ambitious. Tennant called Weale Sister Dorotea and she had grand plans to establish a religious order.

Weale returned to her home in Dorset, but she continued to support the work by employing women from 'The Limes' as servants at her home in Whitchurch Canonicorum. In 1856, she donated £200 to Stanton St Gabriel parish church so that it could be restored and have an extension. This small village was close to her home.

== Death ==
Weale died in at her home, Church House, in Whitchurch Canonicorum in 1918 after some years of being deaf and near blind. She was cared for by her longtime friend. She was buried in Stanton St Gabriel's churchyard in 1918, leaving money to build an Anglican church for the poor in Whitchurch. She left bequests to Maori causes and her will requested that no Roman Catholic should enter her house after she died. Her house gained class two listed status in 2004.
