= Community of St John Baptist =

Anglican religious order founded in 1852

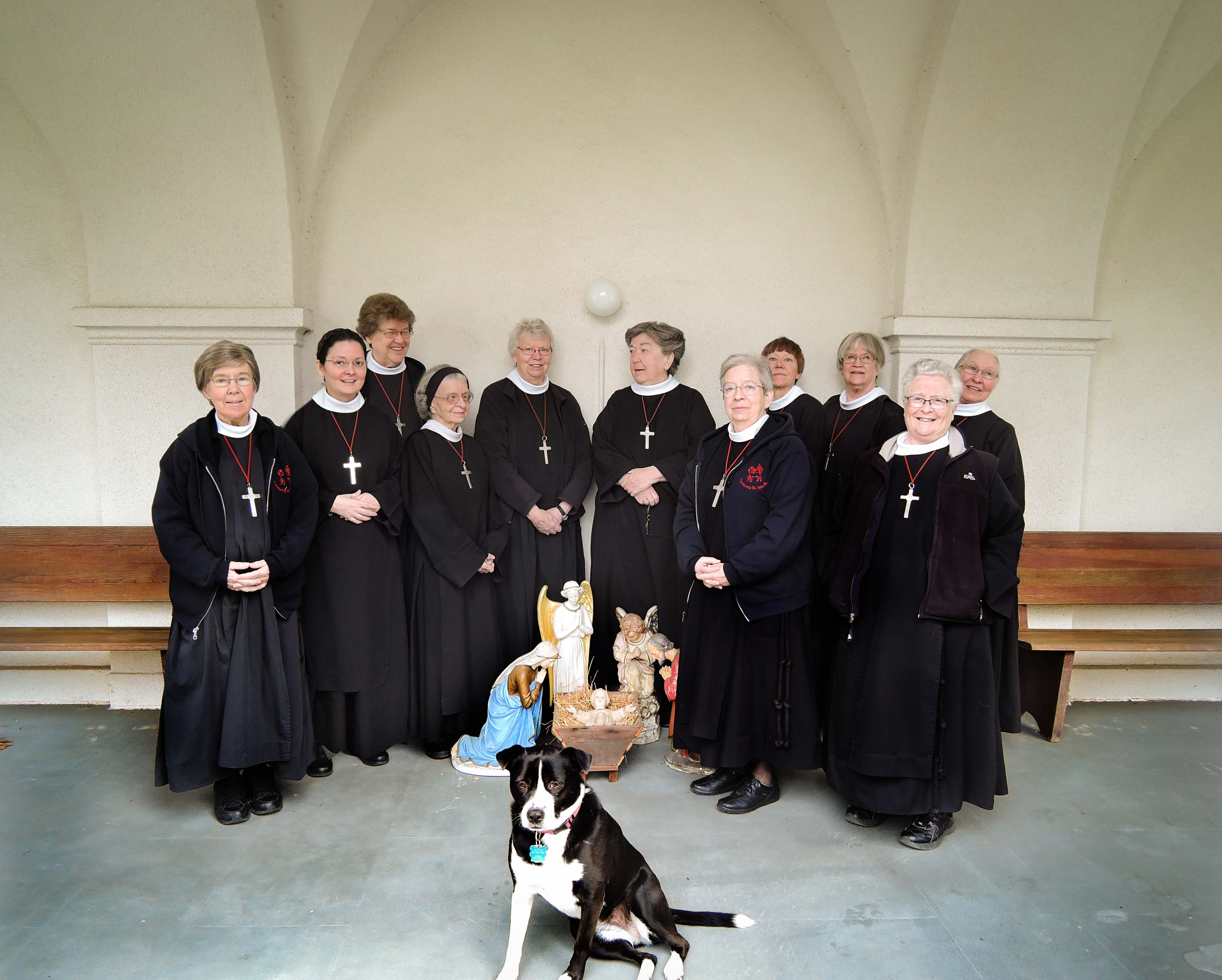
Sisters of the Community of St John Baptist in Mendham, New Jersey in 2016

The Community of St John Baptist (CSJB), also known as the Sisters of Mercy, or formerly Clewer Sisters, is an Anglican religious order of Augustinian nuns.

== History ==
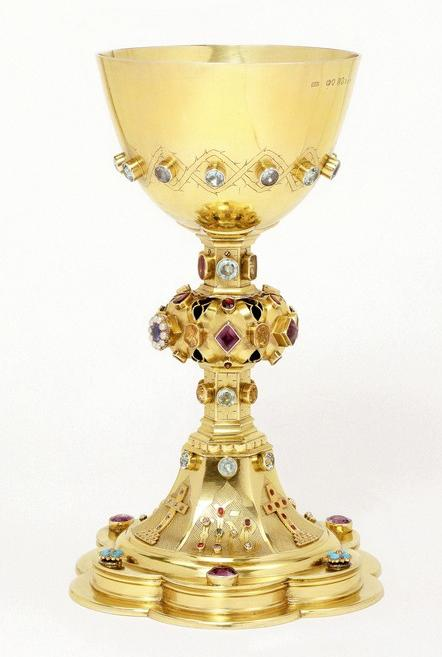
Silver chalice (1856-57), designed by William Butterfield for use at the House of Mercy convent, Clewer; now in the Victoria and Albert Museum

The Community was founded in England in 1852 by Harriet Monsell (the first Superior), a clergy widow, and Thomas Thellusson Carter, a priest at St Andrew's Church, Clewer, Windsor. The purpose of the order was to help marginalised women – mainly single mothers, the homeless and sex trade workers – by providing them shelter and teaching them a trade. The work of the sisters expanded to include administering and working in orphanages, schools, convalescent hospitals, soup kitchens, and women's hostels.

The Community is conspicuous amongst Anglican communities for its meteoric rise in numbers from the date of the foundation. By the time of Carter's death in 1901 there were some 300 Sisters. At its height, the Community had some 45 priories and branch houses.

== CSJB in the United Kingdom ==
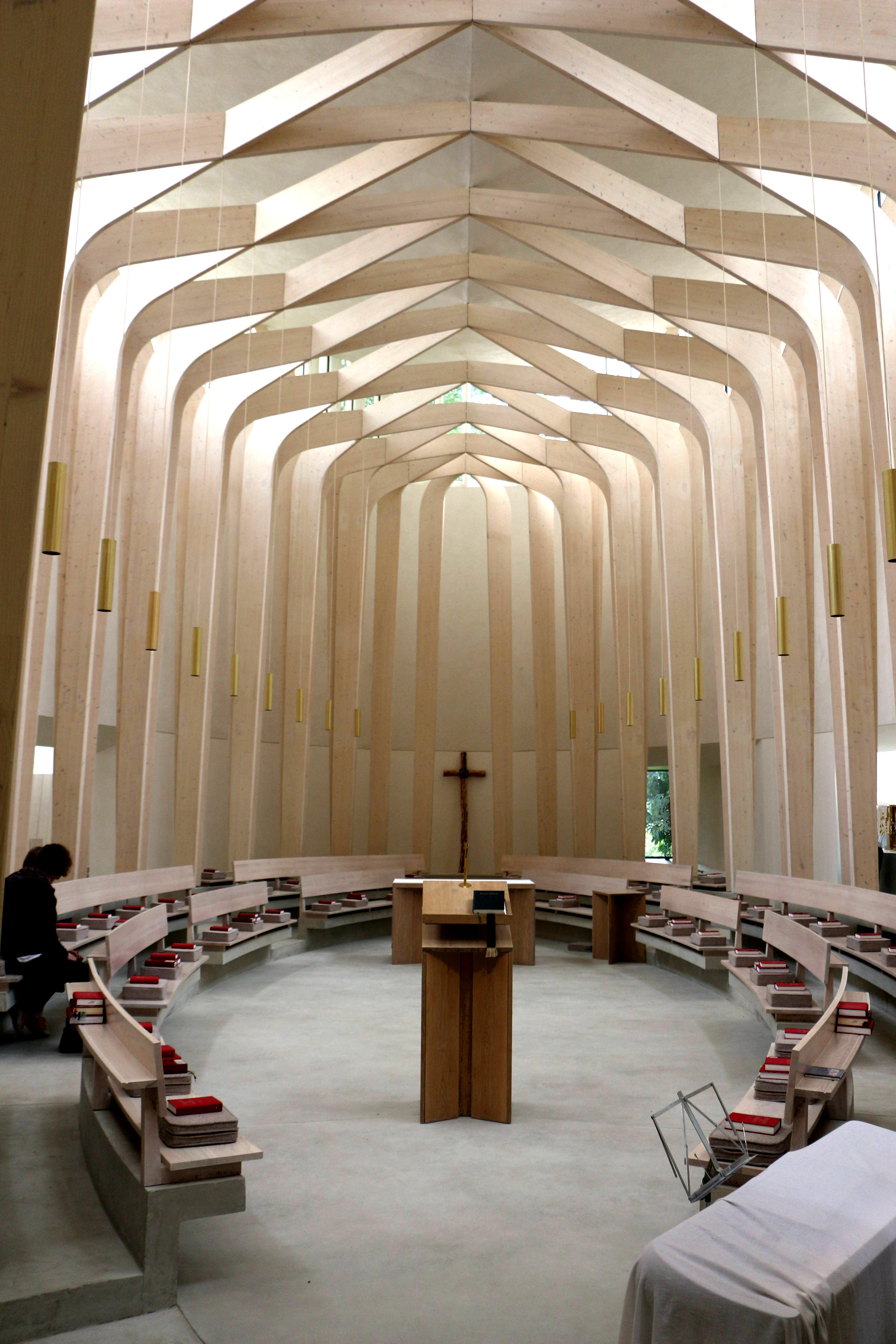
Bishop Edward King Chapel at Ripon College Cuddesdon

The community's headquarters were, historically, at their purpose-built Victorian convent on Hatch Lane, Clewer, Windsor, built from 1853. This very large and imposing structure, by Henry Woodyer, is a local landmark, and includes a highly decorated chapel, and extensive accommodation for sisters, guests, and the female destitute persons to whom the community traditionally gave shelter. William Henry Hutchings was Warden from 1865 to 1884 when he became rector of Pickering, Yorkshire. He was succeeded by Thomas Thellusson Carter. Following a sharp decrease in membership, the community found itself using only a tiny part of the buildings, and in 2001 relocated to Oxfordshire. The original convent has since been converted into flats.

The Sisters lived at Begbroke, near Kidlington in Oxfordshire, for several years, then moved to their newly constructed convent, Harriet Monsell House, which is on the campus of the Ripon College Cuddesdon, a Church of England theological college, in 2013. They also endowed a new chapel, Bishop Edward King Chapel, for the college which will be part of the community's lasting legacy to the church after it has completed its work. The chapel has won several architectural awards since its completion.

Since 1996 the remaining sisters of another order, the Community of the Companions of Jesus the Good Shepherd have been living with the CSJB sisters. Although the two orders remain distinct, they share accommodation and other aspects of community life.

The Clewer Initiative which was set up to continue the Sisters' tradition of protecting the vulnerable and marginalised by combatting modern slavery was funded by the community from 2016-2024.

== CSJB in the United States ==
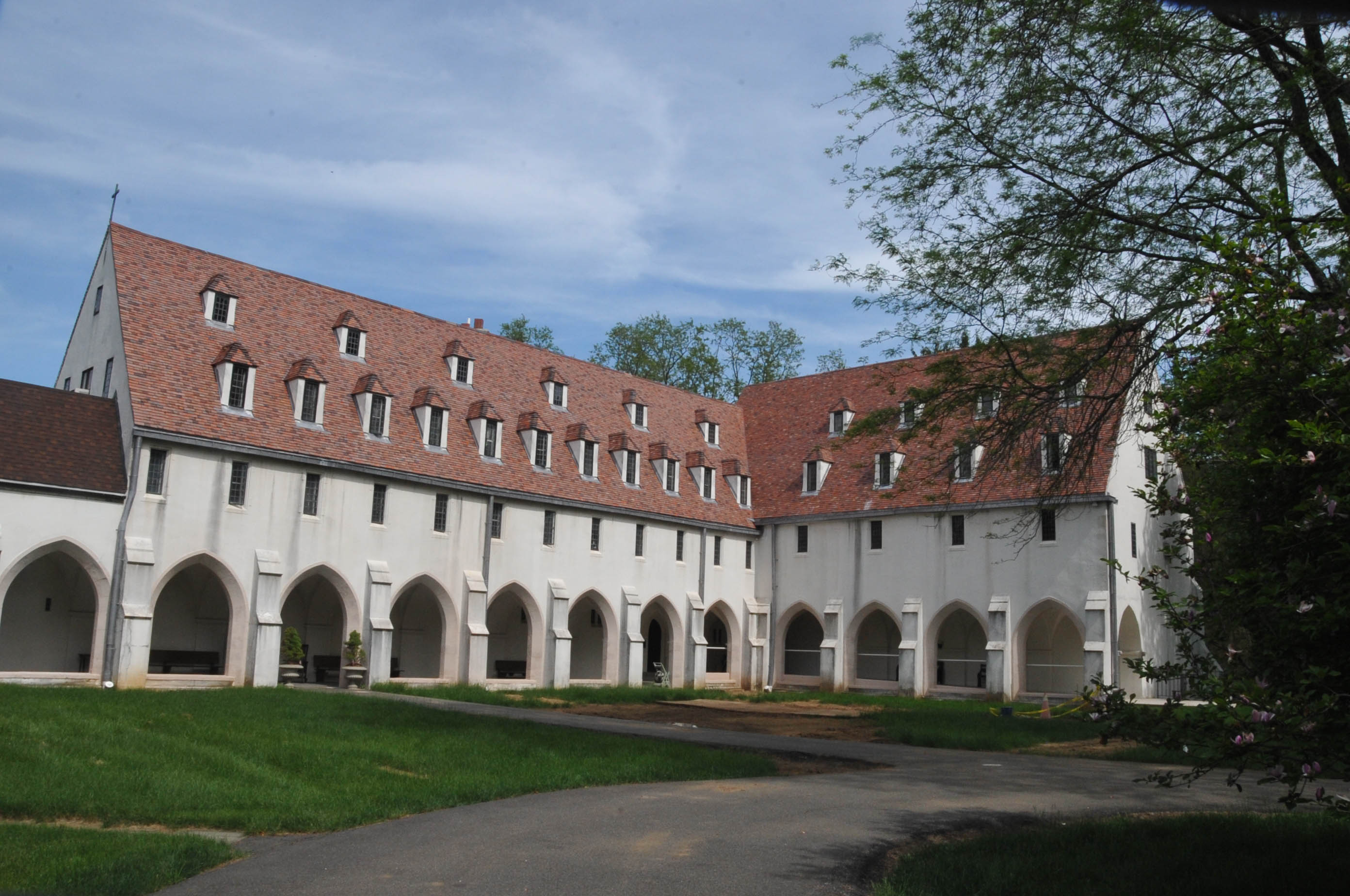
Building in Mendham, New Jersey

The Community expanded to the United States in 1874, following the donation of property by the family of the first American CSJB sister. Work was needed among German immigrants in New York's Lower East Side, and the community established a mother house on Stuyvesant Square at 233 E. 17th St. The American Mother House was eventually moved to Mendham, New Jersey in 1915. In 2007, two Sisters returned to Manhattan, opening a branch house at the Church of Saint Mary the Virgin on Times Square, but in 2018 were recalled to the mother house.

The main convent at 82 West Main Street, Mendham, New Jersey, includes a retreat house for guests and also the community's historic church, all set in over 20 acres of land. The convent building was constructed as the Mother House of the American community in 1913. The sisters then closed down the Mother House at 233 E. 17th St. in Manhattan and moved permanently to Mendham in 1915. The Convent building was added to the American National Register of Historic Places (reference number 07000356) in 2007. The architects of the main convent were Durr Freedley and William W. Cordingly. St Marguerite's Retreat House in Mendham, Built in 1908 in the 'Tudor Revival' style, was a home and school for girls until after World War II, and is now a working retreat house for all denominations. Its architects were James Layng Mills and John C. Greenleaf.

== CSJB in India ==
The Community no longer operates in the Indian sub-continent. Historically, however, there were CSJB houses and missions in India. Their story has been recorded by Valerie Bonham in a book entitled Sisters of the Raj: the Clewer Sisters in India.

== Character ==
Apart from ministries of social aid and assistance, members of the order live a life of prayer, and operate retreat facilities as well as providing retreats and spiritual direction. In these endeavours, they are guided by the Augustinian Rule's emphasis on community spirit.

== Literature ==
- Valerie Bonham, A Joyous Service: The Clewer Sisters and Their Work (2012) ISBN 9780957419704

== See also ==
- Augustinian nuns in the Anglican Communion
- St. John's Diocesan Girls' Higher Secondary School in Kolkata
- St Stephen's College, Broadstairs (closed 1991)
