= Thomas Thellusson Carter =

19th-century English Anglican clergyman (1808–1901)

The Reverend Canon Thomas Thellusson Carter SSC
- Rector of Clewer
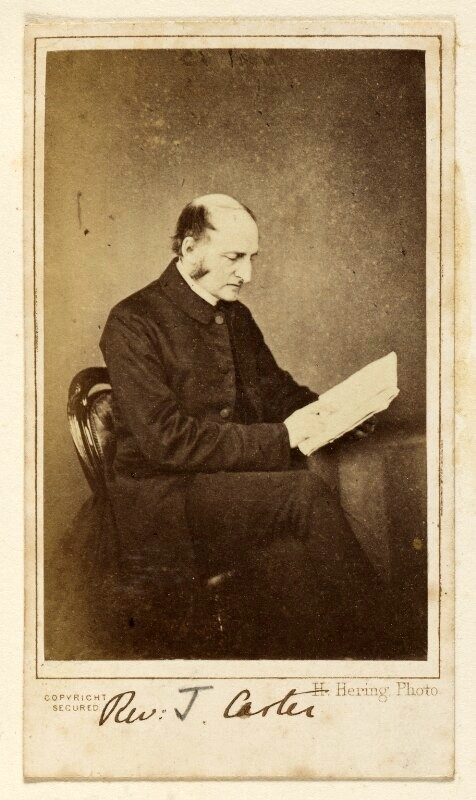
- Church: Church of England
- Diocese: Oxford
- In office: 1844 to 1880
- Other post: Superior General of the Confraternity of the Blessed Sacrament (1862–1897)

Orders
- Ordination: 21 October 1832 (deacon) by Thomas Burgess; 22 December 1833 (priest) by John Kaye

Personal details
- Born: 19 March 1808 Eton, Buckinghamshire, England
- Died: 28 October 1901 (aged 93) Clewer, Berkshire, England
- Denomination: Anglicanism
- Spouse: Mary Ann Gould
- Education: Christ Church, Oxford

Thomas Thellusson Carter SSC (19 March 1808 – 28 October 1901), often known as T. T. Carter, was a significant figure in the Victorian Church of England. He was responsible for reintroducing some Catholic practices to the church and being the founder of the Confraternity of the Blessed Sacrament. He also founded several charitable organisations. He was a prolific writer on church matters and a project exists to collect and collate all his writings. He was for 36 years the Rector of Clewer and an honorary canon of Christ Church Cathedral, Oxford.

== Early life ==
Carter was the son of Thomas Carter (then under master and later vice-provost of Eton College) and his wife Mary (née Proctor). Carter was educated at Eton from the age of six and, when he left, was captain of oppidans. He then entered Christ Church, Oxford, in 1825. Amongst those he met there were Edward Bouverie Pusey who had been a pupil of his father's. He graduated with first class honours in classics in 1831 and attempted to gain a fellowship at Oriel College but was unsuccessful.

Carter's middle name probably derives from the time his father spent as domestic chaplain to John Thellusson, 2nd Baron Rendlesham.

== Ministry ==
Carter was made a deacon on 21 October 1832 by Thomas Burgess, Bishop of Salisbury. He served his first curacy at St Mary, Reading, where Henry Hart Milman was then vicar. Carter was ordained a priest by John Kaye, Bishop of Lincoln, on 22 December 1833 and went to serve as his father's curate, who was then vicar of Burnham, Buckinghamshire.

Carter was married in 1835. Through his wife, he first came into contact with the Tractarian movement, since Richard Hurrell Froude was a family friend. In 1838 he was appointed rector of Piddlehinton (near Dorchester). This proved to be an unhappy appointment and his health suffered. From 1842, he took a period of leave back at Burnham to recover and in 1844 was appointed rector of Clewer (near Windsor).

Here he soon restored the parish church, with the aid of his friend, an architect, Henry Woodyer. Carter also set up two mission churches within the parish, and set out to assist the poor of the parish, establishing a benefit society, a temperance society and converting part of the glebe to allotments. Within the large parish, a particularly poor area was the slum of Clewer Fields, which contained two army barracks and a swiftly changing population of railway navvies, which served to worsen the general problems of drink, prostitution and poverty.

Beginning with just one young woman in December 1848, a parishioner, a widow named Mariquita Tennant, began to take in young women from Clewer Fields, and give them an alternative to life there. This became the Clewer House of Mercy, which Carter, influenced by the writings of John Armstrong strongly supported. Ill-health prompted Tennant's withdrawal from the project in 1851, and she was succeeded by another widow, 40-year-old Harriet Monsell, who became mother superior of the newly created Community of St John Baptist, Clewer on 30 November 1852. Soon there were over forty branch houses, and significant work was undertaken in the United States and India. He founded the Confraternity of the Blessed Sacrament, and led it for 35 years.

Re-establishment of the religious life was still controversial in Anglicanism (all monasteries and other religious houses had been dissolved during the English Reformation), and the foundation of a sisterhood was viewed with alarm in some quarters, not least among them being the Bishop of Oxford (the diocesan), Samuel Wilberforce, despite his misgivings, he acted as Visitor to the community until his move to Winchester in 1869.

Carter was also one of the key figures in the founding of another order of religious sisters, the Community of Reparation to Jesus in the Blessed Sacrament (CRJBS). The order was founded in July 1869. Following the success of the convent at Clewer and the Confraternity of the Blessed Sacrament, the new order of nuns was to make reparation (by prayer) for any dishonour done to Jesus in the Blessed Sacrament. The first members served the novitiate at Clewer before forming their own community based in Southwark.

Carter's involvement in the establishment of this community, and his general commitment to pastoral work drew him into the provision of spiritual direction, which became a new focus of activity and led to the book, The Treasury of Devotion which appeared in 1869. He also became a pioneer of retreats within the Church of England. This work also led him into the controversial area of auricular confession, and in 1865, the book, The Doctrine of Confession in the Church of England. When, in 1873, a controversial petition signed by 483 clergy requesting the provision of suitably qualified confessors was presented to the Convocation of Canterbury, he was one of those who drew up the Declaration on Confession and Absolution, as Set Forth by the Church of England in defence of private confession.

== Family ==
Carter was married at Amberd, Taunton, Somerset on 26 November 1835 to Mary Ann Gould (1802 – 7 February 1869). They had several children, including:

1. Jane Frances Mary Carter (1836–1935)
2. Thomas John Proctor (John) Carter (1841–1899)
3. Georgiana Elizabeth Carter (1843–1920)
