= Begbroke =

Village in Oxfordshire, England

Coordinates: 51.822°N 1.319°W

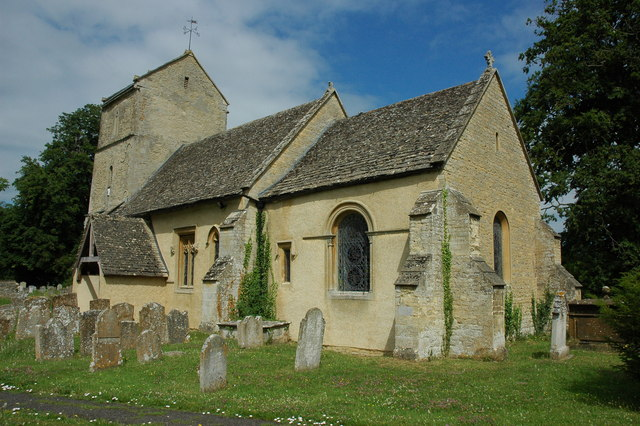
- St Michael's parish church

- Location within Oxfordshire
- Area: 2.88 km^{2} (1.11 sq mi)
- Population: 783 (2011 census)
  - Density: 272/km^{2} (700/sq mi)
- OS grid reference: SP4824
- Civil parish: Begbroke
- District: Cherwell
- Shire county: Oxfordshire
- Region: South East
- Country: England
- Sovereign state: United Kingdom
- Post town: Kidlington
- Postcode district: OX5
- Dialling code: 01865
- Police: Thames Valley
- Fire: Oxfordshire
- Ambulance: South Central
- UK Parliament: Bicester and Woodstock
- Website: Begbroke Parish Council

Begbroke (/ˈbɛɡbrʊk/ BEG-bruuk) is a village and civil parish in Oxfordshire about one mile (1.6 km) west of Kidlington and five miles (8 km) northwest of Oxford. The 2011 census recorded the parish's population as 783.

== Archaeology ==
Fragments of early pottery have been found in the parish, as well as flints, scrapers, and an axe and arrow head. Aerial photographs show ancient crop marks.

== Toponym ==
The toponym "Begbroke" is Old English for "Little Brook". This refers to Rowel Brook which runs through the village and was the reason for its early settlement. Rowel Brook is a tributary of the River Cherwell.

== Manor ==
Begbroke Manor House was built in about 1700. In the 19th century it became part of the Priory of St Philip, which until 2000 was the novitiate house for the Roman Catholic Servite Friars in England. It was then sold to a Church of England order of nuns, the Community of St John Baptist. The brethren of the Servites were well known in the village and served as Air Raid Precautions (ARP) wardens in World War II.

== Parish church ==
The Church of England parish church of Saint Michael was a 12th-century Norman building. The uppermost stage of the tower was rebuilt in the 14th century and the nave and chancel were repeatedly "restored" in the 19th century.

== Economic and social history ==
The former Begbroke Hill Farm was owned by the Giffard and FitzHerbert families for nearly 500 years. It was built early in the 17th century for either Humphrey FitzHerbert (died 1616) or his son Robert (died 1632). It is now the site of the Oxford University Begbroke Science Park (which, despite the name, is accessible only from the neighbouring village of Yarnton but is in the boundary of Begbroke parish).

Orchard House, next to St Michael's parish church, also belonged to the FitzHerberts. More recently it was the home of science fiction author Brian Aldiss. Begbroke Place was built in 1906. From 1940 until 1984 the house was incorporated into the campus of St Juliana's Convent School, an independent girls' school run by the sisters of the Servite Order. Commuter homes were built in the village beginning in the 1930s, mainly on the east side of Woodstock Road.

== Amenities ==
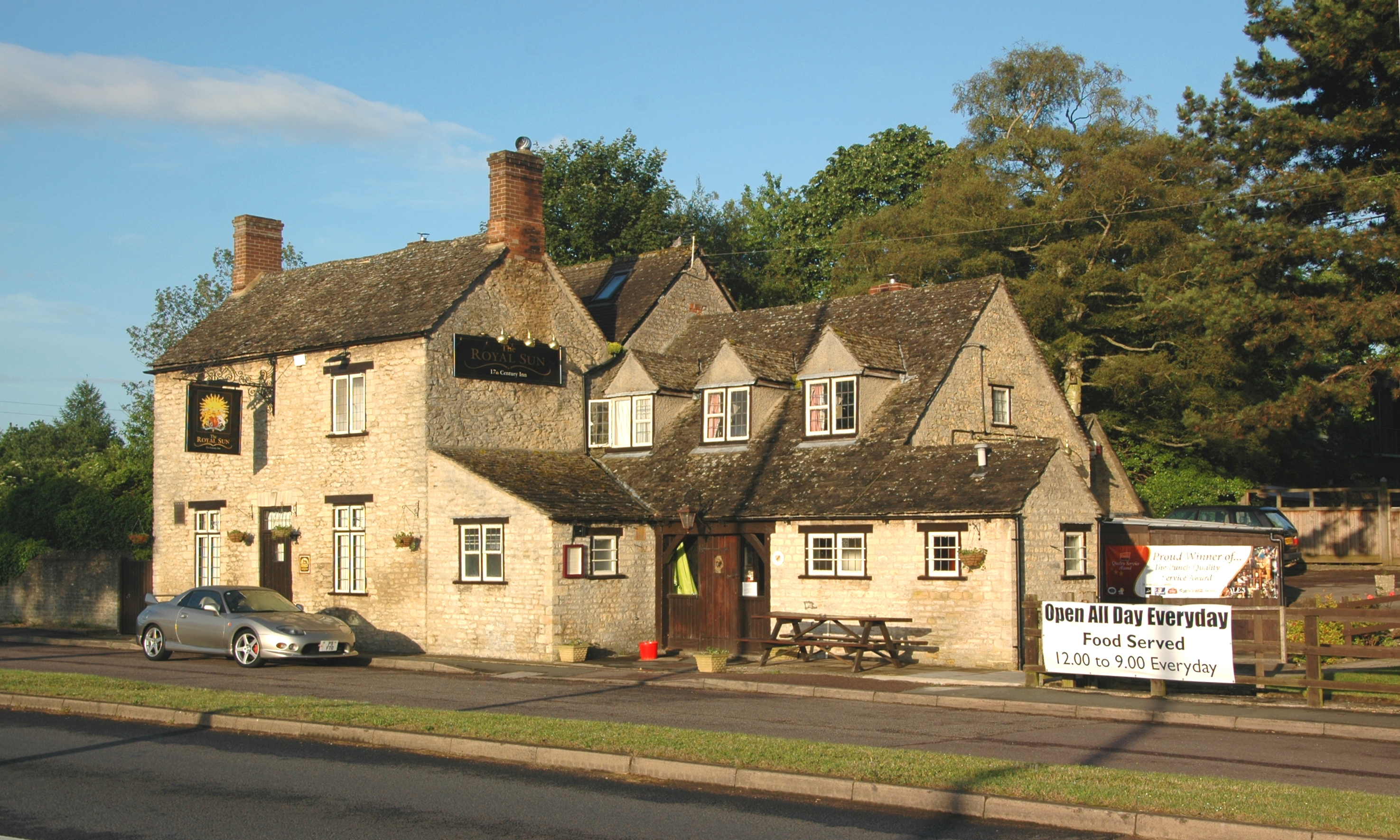
The Royal Sun public house

The village has a public house, the Royal Sun inn, that has traded since at least 1711. Begbroke has a village hall with cricket and bowling greens. Solid State Logic, the world's largest manufacturer of professional analogue and digital audio consoles for music, broadcast, post production and film, is headquartered at Begbroke. SSL bought the convent and convent school buildings.

== Transport ==
The A44 road passes through the village. In 2025, work began to install a toucan crossing across the road.

== Sources ==
- Crossley, Alan; Elrington, C.R.; Baggs, A.P.; Blair, W.J.; Chance, Eleanor; Colvin, Christina; Cooper, Janet; Day, C.J.; Selwyn, Nesta; Townley, Simon C. (1990). A History of the County of Oxford. Victoria County History. Vol. 12: Wootton Hundred (South) including Woodstock. London: Oxford University Press for the Institute of Historical Research. pp. 470–475. ISBN 978-0-19722-774-9.
- Sherwood, Jennifer; Pevsner, Nikolaus (1974). Oxfordshire. The Buildings of England. Harmondsworth: Penguin Books. pp. 449–450. ISBN 0-14-071045-0.
- Sturdy, David (1961–62). "Begbroke Hill Farm". Oxoniensia. XXXVI–XXXVII. Oxford Architectural and Historical Society: 332–335.
