= Anglican Cistercians =

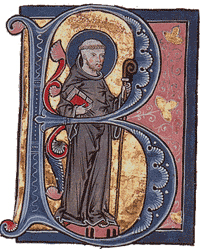
St Bernard of Clairvaux, one of the most influential early Cistercians

Anglican Cistercians are members of the Anglican Communion who live a common life together according to the Cistercian tradition. This tradition is usually dated to 1098 in origin. The term Cistercian is derived from Cistercium, the Latin name for the village of Cîteaux, near Dijon in eastern France. It was in this village that a group of Benedictine monks from the monastery of Molesme founded Cîteaux Abbey in 1098, with the goal of following more closely the Rule of Saint Benedict. Monks following this rule are known as Benedictine, and were at that time the dominant force in Christian monasticism. The monks of Cîteaux Abbey effectively founded a new order (the Cistercians), but one that remains closely associated with the Benedictine Order. As a mark of their distinctive charism and rule, Cistercian monks have long worn white habits to distinguish themselves from Benedictine monks who wear black habits. Within Anglicanism there has historically been less interest in the Cistercian Order than certain other monastic Rules, although Cistercian life has been represented continuously in the Church of England since at least 1966.

== Anglican Cistercian history ==
=== Influence at and beyond the English Reformation ===
The pre-reformation English Church (which included Wales) boasted a number of notable and influential Cistercian abbeys, including Waverley Abbey (Surrey), Rievaulx Abbey (Yorkshire), Fountains Abbey (Yorkshire), and Tintern Abbey (Monmouthshire). All were closed as part of the Dissolution of the Monasteries by Henry VIII, but their history remains significant, and Fountains Abbey is a UNESCO world heritage site. The life of the Cistercian Order in England included a strong work ethic, and the Order was largely responsible for the development of the Medieval English wool trade, which itself became the backbone of a developing English commercial prosperity.

The commercial influence of the Cistercian Order appears to have carried over into the post-reformation era, and the early decades of an independent English Church which represents the roots of Anglicanism. A 2016 study concluded that "English counties that were more exposed to Cistercian monasteries experienced faster productivity growth from the 13th century onwards" and that this influence carried over beyond the dissolution of the monasteries in the 1530s. It has been suggested that the Order's lifestyle and pursuit of wealth were early manifestations of “the Protestant work ethic”, as manifested in the formative years of Anglicanism as a distinct branch of western Christendom.

=== Victorian English monastic revival ===
The revival of religious communities within the Anglican Communion during the 18th century, and more especially the nineteenth and twentieth centuries under the influence of the Oxford Movement, saw the revival of many of the traditional monastic rules, particularly those of the Benedictine, Franciscan and Augustinian orders. However, there were few attempts to revive the Cistercian Rule within the Anglican communion prior to 1966, such as the Congregation of the Servants of Christ, although none that lasted more than a few years.

== Ewell Monastery (OC) ==
In 1966, the Revd Fr Aelred Arnesen OC established the Ewell Monastery Cistercian community, located at West Malling in Kent, which came to receive official recognition by both the Church of England and the worldwide Cistercian Order within the Roman Catholic Church. Arnesan was the prior throughout the life of the monastery. The abbey buildings were constructed on the site of a former farm, with an ancient tithe barn being developed into the community chapel. The chapel still remains after the closure of the monastery and is a Grade II* listed building. The Cistercian Rule was never popular within 20th-century Anglicanism and the community never numbered more than five brothers, although these were often strengthened by temporary residents at the monastery from among the associates of the order. In 2004 the community shrank again leaving the prior as the only remaining member living under vows. The decision was taken to end the Cistercian experiment and the monastery was closed. Arnesen continued to live the religious life as a Cistercian solitary until his death, aged 96, on 7 January 2022.

== Order of Cistercians, Common Observance (OCCO) ==
In the United States in 1981, a group of largely lay-led Anglicans sought to establish a Cistercian association. The original aim was to establish an association of Cistercian oblates under the care of the Benedictine Order, but the experiment developed into a Cistercian community. Having not applied for formal recognition by the Anglican authorities, the order, now known as the Cistercian Order of the Holy Cross, and still using the post-nominal initials OCCO, has developed independently as a non-denominational Cistercian order. Although its origins are in the Anglican Communion, it is now independent of any denominational structure. Its headquarters are at Holy Cross Monastery in North Carolina, and it currently admits both first order (professed) members and oblates of both sexes.

== Order of Cistercians (OC) ==
In 2006, an Anglican Cistercian Association was founded with the aim of keeping Cistercian thought and devotion alive within the Anglican Communion. From this association arose the concept of a new Cistercian order drawing on the Cistercian heritage, the experience of Ewell Monastery, and the enthusiasm of association members for a new form of Cistercian life. A formal monastic order was founded in 2010 as the Order of Anglican Cistercians (OCist); the name was subsequently changed to the Order of Cistercians (OC).

The Order of Cistercians (OC) is an uncloistered and dispersed religious order of ordained and lay men, single, celibate and married, who endeavour to live according to the Rule of Saint Benedict as expressed in the Trappist tradition. It is currently the main representative of the Cistercian tradition within Anglicanism, and in 2013 it received formal acknowledgement from the Anglican Communion's Advisory Council on the Relations of Bishops and Religious Communities. An entry in the online Anglican Religious Life Yearbook can be found in the section (Section 3) of all the recognised and acknowledged religious communities.

The order was founded in 2010, with initial members taking first (simple) vows on 8 September 2011, in the presence of supporters, ecumenical representatives, Abbot Stuart Burns OSB of the Anglican Benedictine Mucknell Abbey (who had been appointed by the Church of England as an official consultant to the new order), and before Bishop Mark Sowerby, Bishop of Horsham, who had accepted the position of episcopal visitor to the new order. On 26 May 2017 three members of the order made their solemn profession at Lambeth Palace in the presence of the Archbishop of Canterbury, Justin Welby, and the order's new episcopal visitor, Tony Robinson, Bishop of Wakefield, who had succeeded Mark Sowerby.

== See also ==
- Anglican religious order
- Former religious orders in the Anglican Communion
- Society of Our Lady of the Isles
