= Anglican religious order =

Community in the Anglican Communion living under a common rule of life

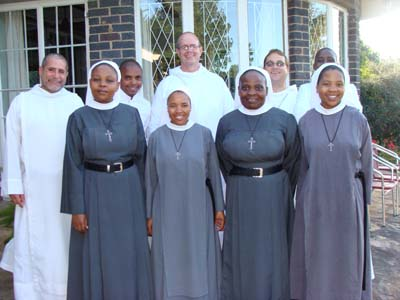
Anglican novices in South Africa.

Anglican religious orders are communities of men or women (or in some cases mixed communities of men and women) in the Anglican Communion who live under a common rule of life. The members of religious orders take vows which often include the traditional monastic vows of poverty, chastity and obedience, or the ancient vow of stability, or sometimes a modern interpretation of some or all of these vows. Members may be laity or clergy, but most orders and their houses include a mixture of both. They lead a common life of work and prayer, sometimes on a single site, sometimes spread over multiple locations. About 2,400 monks and nuns are currently in the Anglican communion, about 55% of whom are women and 45% of whom are men.

Though many Anglicans are members of religious orders recognized by the Anglican Communion, others may be members of ecumenical Protestant or Old Catholic religious orders while maintaining their Anglican identity and parochial membership in Anglican churches.

== Titles ==
Members of religious communities may be known as monks or nuns, particularly in those communities which require their members to live permanently in one location. Brother and Sister are common forms of address across all religious communities. They may also be known as friars or sisters, terms used particularly (though not exclusively) within religious orders whose members are more active in the wider community, often living in smaller group houses rather than in larger monastic or cloistered houses. Amongst such friars and sisters the descriptor term mendicant is sometimes applied to their orders: those whose members are geographically mobile and more focused on an outwardly-facing work or ministry (e.g., with the poor).

The titles Father and Mother or Reverend Father and Reverend Mother are commonly applied to the leader of a community, or sometimes more generally to all members who have been ordained as priests or elected to leadership offices by the community.

In the Benedictine Anglican tradition the formal honorific titles Right Reverend and Very Reverend are sometimes applied to the Abbot (leader) and Prior (deputy leader) of a religious community. (Note: See, for example, the titles stated at: Alton Abbey website at the Wayback Machine (archived April 30, 2012).) Benedictine communities sometimes apply the titles Dom and Dame to professed male and female members (rather than Brother and Sister).

== History ==
=== Overview ===
Religious orders were dissolved by King Henry VIII when he separated the Church of England from papal primacy. In 1626, Nicholas Ferrar, a protegé of William Laud (1573–1645), with his family, established the Little Gidding community. Since there was no formal Rule (such as the Rule of Saint Benedict), no vows taken, and no enclosure, Little Gidding cannot be said to be a formal religious community, like a monastery, convent, or hermitage. The household had a routine according to high church principles and the Book of Common Prayer. Fiercely denounced by the Puritans and denounced as "Protestant Nunnery" and as an "Arminian heresy", Little Gidding was attacked in a 1641 pamphlet entitled "The Arminian Nunnery". The fame of the Ferrars and the Little Gidding community spread and they attracted visitors. King Charles I visited three times, including on 2 May 1646 seeking refuge after the Cavalier defeat at the Battle of Naseby. The community ended when its last member died in 1657.

Although the Ferrar community remained a part of the Anglican ethos (Bishop Francis Turner composed a memoir of Nicholas Ferrar prior to his death in 1700), not until the mid-nineteenth century with the Oxford Movement and the revival of Anglican religious orders did Little Gidding reach the consciousness of the average Anglican parishioner. Since that time, interest in such community life has grown, and not been limited to members of the Anglican Communion. According to ascetical theologian Martin Thornton, much of the appeal is due to Nicholas Ferrar and the Little Gidding community's exemplifying the lack of rigidity (representing the best Anglicanism's via media can offer) and "common-sense simplicity", coupled with "pastoral warmth", which are traceable to the origins of Christianity.

Between 1841 and 1855, several religious orders for women were begun, among them the Community of St Mary the Virgin at Wantage and the Society of Saint Margaret at East Grinstead. Religious orders for men appeared later, beginning in 1866 with the Society of St. John the Evangelist or "Cowley Fathers". In North America, the founding of Anglican religious orders began in 1842 with the Nashotah Community for men in Wisconsin, followed in 1845 by the Sisterhood of the Holy Communion under Anne Ayres in New York.

In recent decades, religious orders have been remarkably grown in other parts of the Anglican Communion, most notably in Tanzania, South Africa, the Solomon Islands, Vanuatu, and Papua New Guinea. About 2,400 monks and nuns are currently in the Anglican communion, about 55% of whom are women and 45% of whom are men.

=== Restoration ===
During the three centuries from dissolution to restoration some views expressed a desire for the restoration of the religious life within Anglicanism. In 1829 the poet Robert Southey, in his Colloquies (cxiii.), trusts that “thirty years hence this reproach also may be effaced, and England may have its Beguines and its Sisters of mercy. It is grievously in need of them.”

Practical efforts were made in the religious households of Nicholas Ferrar at Little Gidding, 1625, and of William Law at King's Cliffe, 1743; and under Charles II, says Fr. Bede in his Autobiography, “about 12 Protestant ladies of gentle birth and considerable means” founded a short-lived convent, with William Sancroft, then Dean of St Paul's, for director.

Southey's appeal had weight, and before the thirty years had passed, compassion for the needs of the destitute in great cities, and the impulse of a strong Church revival, aroused a body of laymen, among whom were included William Gladstone, Sir T. D. Acland, Mr A. J. Beresford-Hope, Lord Lyttelton and Lord John Manners (chairman), to exertions which restored sisterhoods to the Church of England. On 26 March 1845 the Park Village Community was set on foot in Regent's Park, London, to minister to the poor population of St Pancras. The “Rule” was compiled by Edward Pusey, who also gave spiritual supervision. In the Crimean War the superior and other sisters went out as nurses with Florence Nightingale. The community afterwards united with the Devonport Sisters, founded by Miss Sellon in 1849, and together they form what is known as Ascot Priory. The St Thomas's sisterhood at Oxford commenced in 1847; and the mother-superior of the Society of the Holy and Undivided Trinity Convent at Oxford, Marian Hughes, dedicated herself before witnesses to such a life as early as 1841.

=== Activity ===
Four sisterhoods stand together as the largest: those of Clewer, Wantage, All Saints and East Grinstead; and the work of the first may stand as a specimen of that of others. The Community of St John Baptist at Clewer, near Windsor, arose in 1849 through the efforts of a Mrs Tennant and the vicar, afterwards warden of the society, the Revd T. T. Carter, to save "fallen women". Under the first superior, Harriet Monsell, the numbers steadily grew and at the beginning of the 20th century were over 200. Their services to society and the church include six houses for "fallen women", seven orphanages, nine elementary and high schools and colleges, five hospitals, mission work in 13 parishes and visiting in several “married quarters” of barracks. Many of these are notable institutions and their labours extend over a wide area; two of the settlements are in India and two in the United States. A list of 26 sisterhoods is given in the Official Year-Book of the C.E. (1900), to which may be added 10 institutions of deaconesses, many of whom live in community under a rule. In 1909 the number of women in religious orders in England was estimated as some 1300; whereas at the time of the dissolution under King Henry VIII there had only been 745.

The Episcopal Church of Scotland has three sisterhoods and they are found also in Toronto, Saint John the Divine; Brisbane, Sacred Advent. The Year-Book (1911) of the Episcopal Church of America mentions 18 American sisterhoods and seven deaconess homes and training colleges.

Practically all Anglican sisterhoods originated in works of mercy and this largely accounts for the rapidity with which they have won their way to the good will and confidence of the Church. Their number is believed to exceed 3,000, and the demand for their services is greater than the supply. Bishops are often their visitors, and Church Congresses, Convocation and Lambeth Conferences have given them encouragement and regulation. This change in sympathy, again, has gained a hearing from modern historians, who tend more and more to discredit the wholesale defamation of the dissolution period.

This charitable activity, however, distinguishes the modern sister from the nuns of primitive and medieval times, who were cloistered and contemplative, and left external works to deaconesses, or to laywomen of a third order, or to the freer societies like the Beguines. St Vincent de Paul is considered to have begun the new era with his institution of Sisters of Charity in 1634 . Another modern feature is the fuller recognition of family ties: Rule 29 of the Clewer sisters directs that the sisters shall have free intercourse with relations, who may visit them at any time. But in most essential respects modern sisterhoods follow the ancient traditions. They devote themselves to the celibate life, have property in common, and observe a common rule of prayer, fellowship and work. Government is by a sister superior, assisted by various officers. The warden and chaplain are clergy, and the visitor is commonly a bishop.

== Types of orders and communities ==
Whilst there is no single central authority for all religious orders, and many member churches of the Anglican Communion have their own internal structures for recognizing and regulating religious orders, some central functions are performed by the Anglican Religious Communities department at Church House, Westminster, the headquarters of the Church of England, Church Commissioners, General Synod, Archbishops' Council, and National Society. This department publishes the bi-annual Anglican Religious Life, a world directory of religious orders, and also maintains an official Anglican Communion website for religious orders. Anglican Religious Life defines four categories of community.

Traditional celibate religious orders and communities
Orders and communities in which members take a vow of celibacy (amongst other vows) and follow a common Rule of life. They may be enclosed and contemplative or open and engaged in apostolic works.
Dispersed communities
These are orders or communities whose members, whilst taking vows (including celibacy), do not live together in community. In most cases the members are self-supporting and live alone, but follow the same Rule of life, and meet together frequently in assemblies often known as "chapter meetings". In some cases some members may share a common life in very small groups of two or three.
Acknowledged communities
These communities live a traditional Christian life, including the taking of vows, but the traditional vows are adapted or changed. In many cases these communities admit both single and married persons as members, requiring celibacy on the part of those who are single, and unfailing commitment to their spouse on the part of married members. They also amend the vow of poverty, allowing personal possessions, but requiring high standards of tithing to the community and the wider church. These communities often have residential elements, but not full residential community life, as this would be incompatible with some elements of married family life.
Other communities
This group contains communities which are ecumenical (including Anglicans) or that belong to non-Anglican churches which have entered into relationships of full communion with Anglican churches (particularly, but not only, certain Lutheran churches).

In the United States of America, there is a clear distinction between "orders" and "communities", since the Episcopal Church has its own two-fold definition of "religious orders" (equivalent to the first two groups above) and "Christian communities" (equivalent to the third group above). (Note: See Title III, Canon 24, sections 1 and 2 of the Canons of the Episcopal Church in the United States of America, also quoted at "Anglican Communion religious communities". communities.anglicancommunion.org. Archived from the original on 21 February 2015.) The Anglican Religious Life directory affirms this, stating "This distinction in not used in other parts of the Anglican Communion where [the term] communities is also used for those who take traditional vows."

== Anglican orders and interdenominational orders ==
Some religious orders are unique to the Anglican Communion. Certain large orders, such as the Society of Saint Margaret or the Community of the Sisters of the Church, are widespread and follow a rule of life written especially for the community. Other communities follow one of a number of historic rules predating the ecclesial divisions of the Reformation era. These rules are followed by different orders which often have manifestations within different current Christian denominations, particularly (in most cases) Anglicanism, Roman Catholicism and Lutheranism and, in some cases, also Eastern Orthodoxy.

=== Augustinian orders ===
There are a number of Anglican communities of nuns following the Rule of St Augustine of Hippo. This rule has a particular focus on making all of one's thoughts and speech God-centred. There is no central Augustinian administration beyond the common rule.

=== Benedictine orders ===
The Benedictine order is active in all the Christian denominations mentioned above, including the Eastern Orthodox tradition. Within the Roman Catholic Church there is a central Benedictine Confederation (notwithstanding the autonomy of each abbey) and the Anglican Benedictine orders maintain close relations with this central organisation (although without actual membership). The rule has a particular emphasis on community life, hospitality for strangers and achieving a proper balance of work, prayer and recreation.

=== Carmelite orders ===
The Carmelite Rule has found more limited use in the Anglican Communion than some others. The Community of the Sisters of the Love of God in Oxford, England, are heavily influenced by Carmelite spirituality and follow elements of the Carmelite Rule, but their rule also has many other influences. The Episcopal Carmel of Saint Teresa in Maryland is a full expression of the Carmelite order and rule within Anglicanism, founded for that purpose with the support of the American House of Bishops. The sisters follow the Discalced Carmelite rule and therefore use the post-nominal initials OCD.

=== Cistercian orders ===
Although a number of cloistered Cistercian orders have been founded within Anglicanism, none has proved enduring. The longest Cistercian experiment was the community of Ewell Monastery (1966 to 2004). Some Anglican communities follow an adapted form of the Cistercian Rule and a single member of the former Ewell Monastery lived as a Cistercian solitary until 2022. Since 2010 there exists the Order of Anglican Cistercians who enjoy an ecumenical link with the Roman Catholic Cistercians.

=== Dominican orders ===
The Anglican Order of Preachers is a recognized "Christian Community" of the Episcopal Church in the United States and has spread to Canada, the United Kingdom and Europe, the Philippines, Australia and India. The friars and sisters live under a common rule of life and vows of simplicity, purity, and obedience. There are also Anglicans who are members of ecumenical and Old Catholic Dominican religious orders and priories.

The Order of Christ the Saviour is a dispersed Dominican Order within the Episcopal Church, and an "Associate Community" of the National Association of Episcopal Christian Communities. The Order is characterized by its unique blend of Thomistic scholarship and a dedicated focus on deliverance ministry in the Anglican tradition. The Order embraces the Rule of St. Augustine, guiding its members towards a life of prayer, community service, and frequent engagement with the sacraments. Membership in the Order is open to confirmed Anglican communicants in good standing and in communion with the See of Canterbury.

=== Franciscan orders ===
A number of Anglican religious orders follow the Rule of St Francis of Assisi, although the Society of St. Francis is the largest and most widespread. The rule has a particular focus on poverty and identifying with the poor and the destitute as well as care of the environment and respect for all of creation.

=== Vincentian orders ===
The Vincentian Family of religious institutions founded by, or in the spirit of, Saint Vincent de Paul, is found within the Roman Catholic and Anglican traditions. In Anglicanism the main Vincentian Order for women is the Sisters of Charity, and the main order for men is the Company of Mission Priests. The rule has a particular emphasis on care for the poor and marginalised in society.

== List of current orders ==
The following is a list of the religious orders in the Anglican Communion with their initials and locations:

=== Orders of men ===
- Brotherhood of the Ascended Christ (BAC) India
- Community of Our Lady & Saint John Alton Abbey (OSB) England
- Community of the Resurrection (CR) England
- Elmore Abbey (OSB) England
- Little Brothers of Francis (LBF) Australia
- Melanesian Brotherhood (MBH) Solomon Islands, Papua New Guinea, Vanuatu, the Philippines
- Oratory of the Good Shepherd (OGS) England, Australia, United States, South Africa
- Order of the Holy Cross (OHC) United States, Canada, South Africa
- "Order of Saint Francis (OSF)". United States, Canada.
- Saint Gregory's Abbey (OSB) United States
- Society of the Sacred Mission (SSM) England, South Africa, Australia
- Society of Saint Francis (SSF) England, United States, Australia, New Zealand, Brazil, Papua New Guinea, Solomon Islands
- Society of St. John the Evangelist (SSJE) England, United States
- Society of St. Paul (SSP) United States

=== Orders of women ===
- All Saints Sisters of the Poor (ASSP) England
- Benedictine Sisters of Bethany (EBSB) Cameroon
- Chama Cha Mariamu Mtakatifu, [Community of Saint Mary of Nazareth and Calvary] (CMM) Tanzania, Zambia
- Chita che Zita Rinoyera, Community of the Holy Name (CZR) Zimbabwe
- Community of the Holy Family (CHF) United States
- Christa Sevika Sangha Handmaids of Christ (CSS) Bangladesh
- Community of All Hallows (CAH) England
- Community of Christ the King (CCK) Australia
- Community of Jesus' Compassion (CJC) South Africa
- Community of Nazareth (CN) Japan
- Community of St. Andrew (CSA) England
- Community of St. Clare (OSC) England
- Community of St. Francis (CSF) England, United States
- Community of St John Baptist (CSJB), England, United States
- Community of St. John the Divine (CSJD) England
- Community of St. Laurence (CSL) England
- Community of St. Mary (CSM) United States, Malawi, the Philippines
- Community of St. Mary at the Cross (OSB) England
- Community of St. Mary the Virgin (CSMV) England
- Community of St. Peter (CSPH) Horbury, England
- Community of the Blessed Lady Mary (CBLM) Zimbabwe
- Community of the Companions of Jesus the Good Shepherd (CJGS) England
- Community of the Franciscan Servants of Jesus & Mary (FSJM) England
- Community of the Good Shepherd (CGS) Malaysia
- Community of the Holy Cross (CHC) England
- Community of the Holy Name (Australia) (CHN) Australia
- Community of the Holy Name (CHN) England, Lesotho, South Africa
- Community of the Holy Spirit (CHS) United States
- Community of the Sacred Name (CSN) Fiji, New Zealand, Tonga
- Community of the Sacred Passion (CSP) England
- Community of the Sisters of Melanesia (CSM) Solomon Islands
- Community of the Sisters of the Church (CSC) Canada, England, Solomon Islands, Australia
- Community of the Sisters of the Love of God (SLG) England, New Zealand
- Community of the Transfiguration (CT) United States, Dominican Republic
- Congregation of the Sisters of the Visitation of our Lady (CVL) Papua New Guinea
- Daughters of St. Francis (DSF) Korea
- Episcopal Carmel of Saint Teresa (OCD) United States
- Fikambanan'ny Mpanompovavin l Jesoa Kristy [Society of the Servants of Jesus Christ] (FMJK) Madagascar
- Malling Abbey (OSB) England
- Order of St. Anne (OSA) United States
- Order of St. Anne at Bethany (OSA) United States
- Order of St. Helena (OSH) United States
- Order of the Holy Paraclete (OHP) England, Ghana, Swaziland
- Sisterhood of St. John the Divine (SSJD) Canada
- Sisterhood of the Holy Nativity (SHN) United States
- Sisters of Charity (SC) England, United States
- Sisters of the Incarnation (SI) Australia
- Sisters of the Love of God (SLG) England
- Society of Our Lady of the Isles (SOLI) Scotland
- "Society of St John the Divine (SSJD)". Natal, South Africa – via worldanglican.com.
- Society of St. Margaret (SSM) England, United States, Haiti
- Society of the Holy Cross (SHC) Korea
- Society of the Precious Blood (SPB) England, South Africa, Lesotho
- Society of the Sacred Advent (SSA) Australia
- Servants of the Sacred Cross (SSC) Canada
- Society of the Sacred Cross (SSC) Wales
- Society of the Sisters of Bethany (SSB) England

=== Mixed orders of men and women ===
- Anglican Order of Preachers (Dominicans) (OP)
- Chita che Zvipo Zve Moto Community of the Gifts of the Holy Fire (CZM) Zimbabwe
- Christ Mission Anglican Benedictines (OSB)
- "Community of Divine Love (CDL)". California.
- Community of the Glorious Ascension (CGA) England, France
- Community of the Holy Spirit Monastery (HSM) Zimbabwe
- Community of the Holy Transfiguration (CHT) Zimbabwe
- Community of the Mother of Jesus (CMJ) Chicago
- "Community of the Resurrection of our Lord (CR)". Grahamstown, South Africa – via worldanglican.com.
- Community of the Servants of the Will of God (CSWG) England
- Companions of Our Lady of Walsingham (OLW) United States
- Mucknell Abbey (OSB) England
- Order of Christ the Saviour (OCS) Dominicans
- Order of Julian of Norwich (OJN) United States
- Order of St. Patrick (OSP) United States.
- Society of the Sacred Mission (SSM) England, Lesotho, Japan, Australia, South Africa
- Order of Saint Benedict (OSB) Camperdown Victoria Australia
- Third Order of Saint Francis (TSSF)

== List of other communities ==
- Anglican Order of Preachers (Dominicans)
- Brotherhood of Saint Gregory
- Community of Celebration
- Community of the Gospel
- Community of the Paraclete
- Community of St Barnabas and Cecelia, South Australia
- Community of St. Denys
- Companions of St. Luke (OSB)
- Company of Mission Priests
- Congregation of the Companions of the Holy Saviour
- Little Sisters of Saint Clare
- Moana St Clare, Diocese of Polynesia, Fiji
- "New Anglican Missionary Society".
- Order of Anglican Cistercians
- "Order of the Ascension (OA)".
- "The Emmaus Community". Victoria, BC, Canada.
- "Order of Christ the Saviour (OCS)".
- Order of St Andrew
- "Holywell Community". Abergavenny.
- Order of St Anthony the Great (OPC)
- Rivendell Community
- "The Order of Mission (TOM)".
- The Servants of the Sacred Cross
- Sisterhood of Saint Gregory
- Worker Brothers of the Holy Spirit
- Worker Sisters of the Holy Spirit

== In popular media ==
In her autobiographical series Call the Midwife, British author Jennifer Worth portrayed her time working as a district nurse and midwife in the East End of London in the late 1950s alongside the Community of St. John the Divine. In the books, and the BBC television drama series of the same name, the order is renamed the Sisters of St. Raymond Nonnatus.

The 1939 novel Black Narcissus by Rumer Godden is about a group of Anglican Nuns (the Order of the Servants of Mary) who persist in trying to establish a religious community in the Palace of Mopu in the Himalayas, Nepal, despite the sisters feeling sexual repression and enduring forbidden love. Both the 1947 film Black Narcissus and the 2020 miniseries of the same name were adaptations of the book.

== Gallery ==
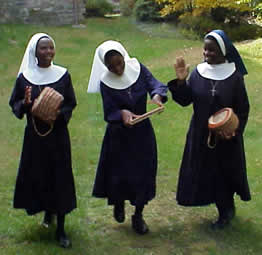
Community of Saint Mary

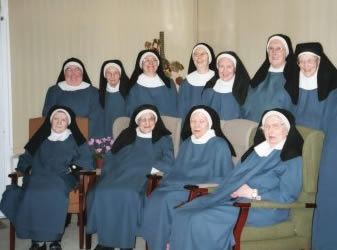
Sisters of Bethany

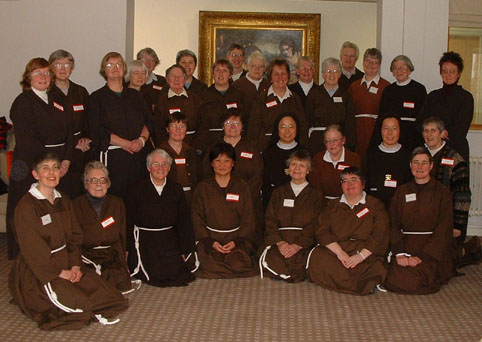
Community of Saint Francis

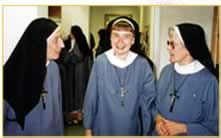
Community of the Holy Name

Community of the Transfiguration

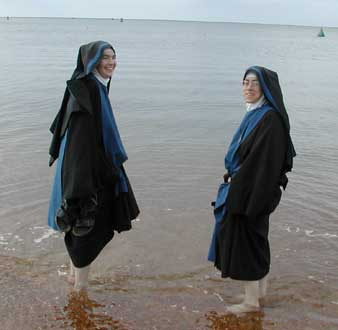
Order of Julian of Norwich

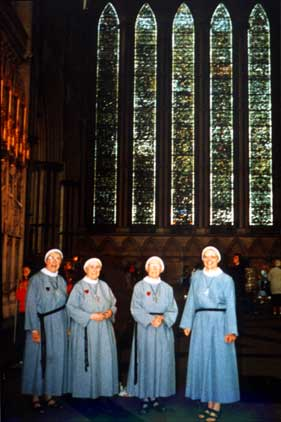
Order of the Holy Paraclete

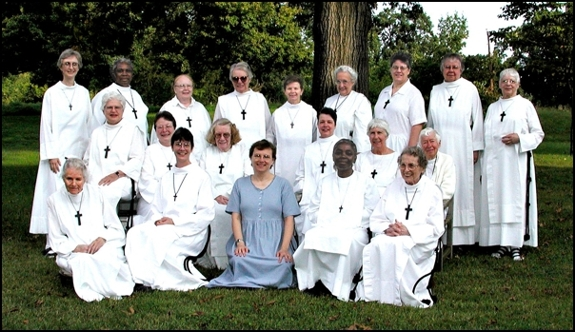
Order of Saint Helena

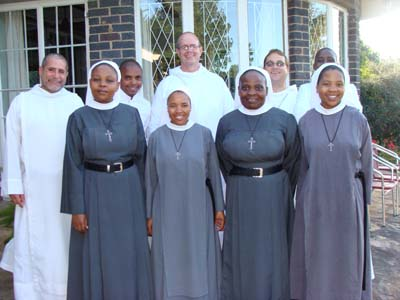
Anglican novices in South Africa

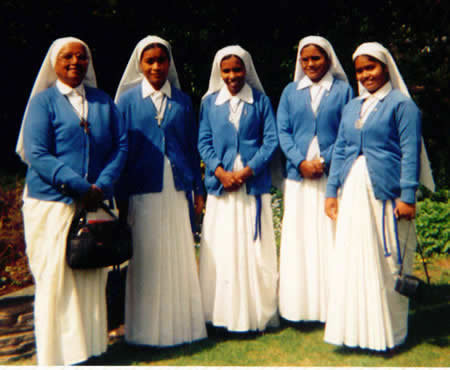
Handmaids of Christ

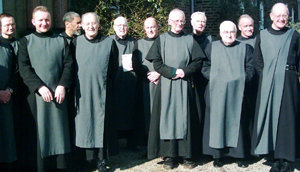
Community of the Resurrection

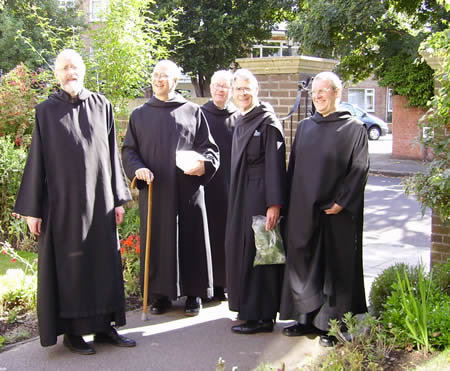
Alton Abbey

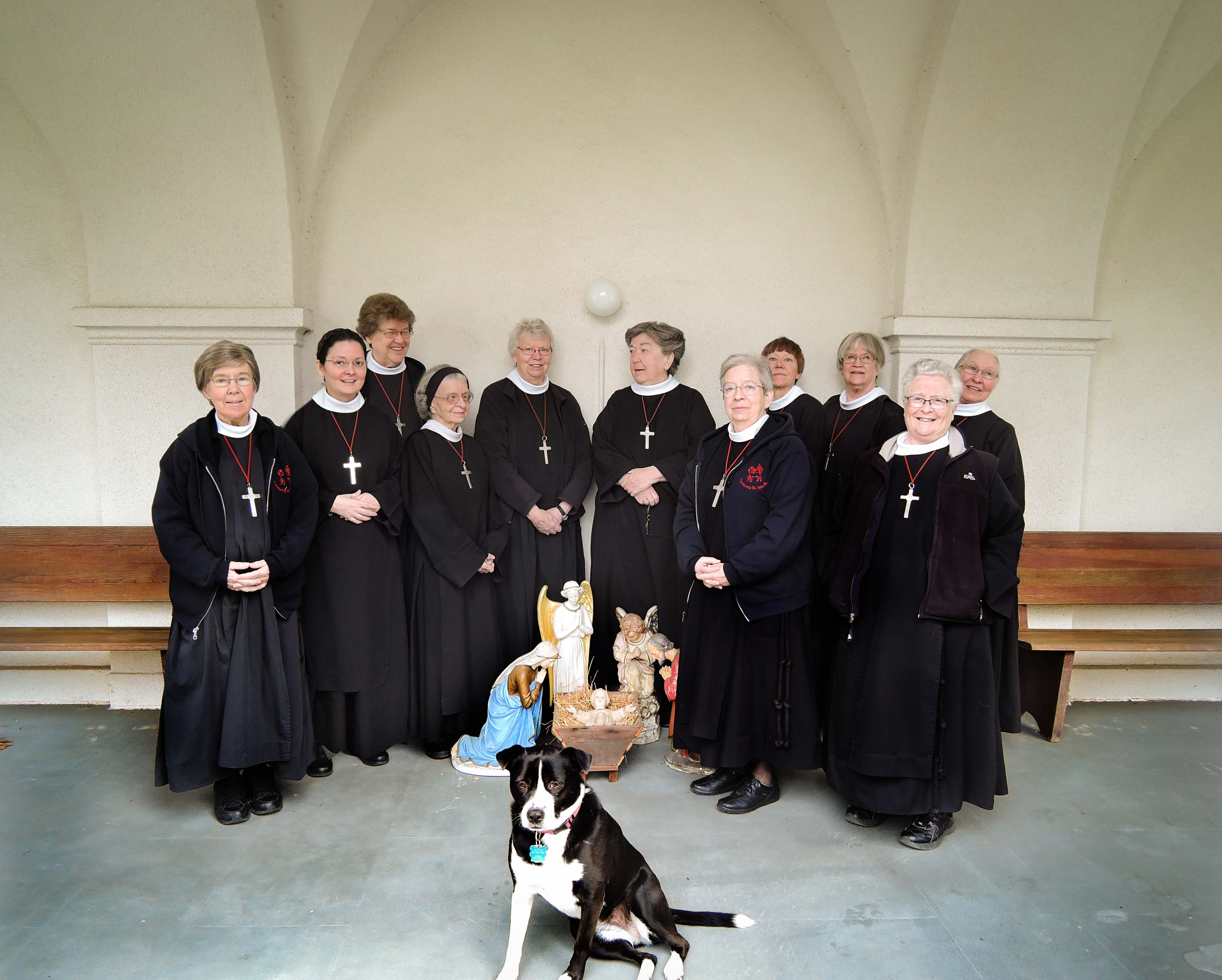
The Community of St. John Baptist at Mendham, NJ

== See also ==
- Augustinian nuns in the Anglican Communion
- Franciscan orders in the Anglican Communion
- Order of St Benedict (Anglican)
