= Vincentian Family =

Organizations inspired by Vincent de Paul

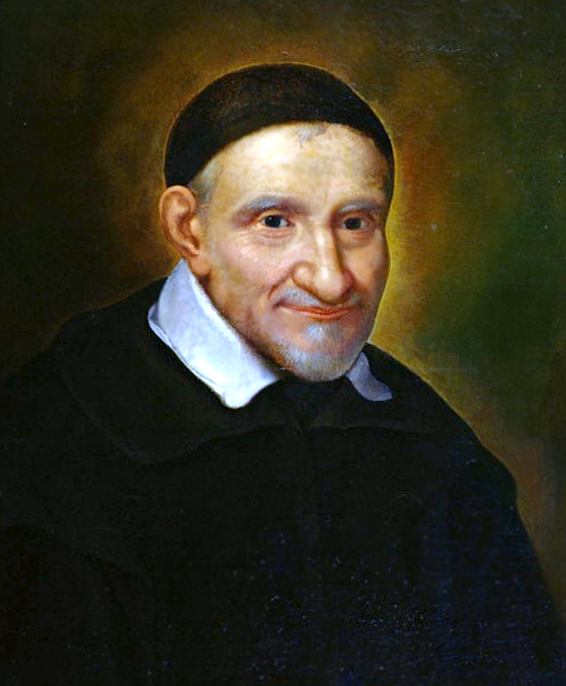
Vincent de Paul

The Vincentian Family comprises organizations inspired by the life and work of Vincent de Paul, a 17th-century French priest who "transformed the face of France."

== Catholic Church ==
Vincent de Paul directly founded the Confraternities of Charity (today known as the AIC), the Congregation of the Mission and the Daughters of Charity of Saint Vincent de Paul. Frederic Ozanam, inspired by a Daughter of Charity, Rosalie Rendu, founded the Society of St. Vincent de Paul.

Other members of the Vincentian family include the Missionary Servants of the Most Holy Trinity, and the affiliated women's congregation. Betty Ann McNeil, DC, has written a definitive work identifying some 268 institutes that meet at least one criterion as members of the Vincentian Family.

The Vincentian Family, inter alia, has, as its incumbent head, Tomaž Mavrič of Buenos Aires, the incumbent worldwide superior general of the Congregation of the Mission, elected during the community's 42nd General Assembly (June 27 – July 15, 2016) in Chicago.

== Anglican Communion ==
In Anglicanism the main Vincentian order for women is the Sisters of Charity, and the main order for men is the Company of Mission Priests. A newly formed priestly congregation, the Sodality of Mary, Mother of Priests (Sodalitas Mariae, Matris Sacerdotum) whose first aspirants took vows in February 2016, has also stated that its intention is to follow a Vincentian Rule.

== See also ==
- Vincentian Studies Institute at DePaul University, Chicago, US
