= Sisters of Bethany =

Sisters of Bethany may refer to:

- The Sisters of Bethany, an order of Benedictine nuns affiliated with a convent beside the Tomb of Lazarus during the Crusades
- Benedictine Sisters of Bethany (EBSB), an Anglican order of nuns in Cameroon
- Society of the Sisters of Bethany (SSB), an Anglican order of sisters in Hampshire, England
