= CJC =

CJC may refer to:

== Law and jurisprudence ==
- The Corpus Juris Civilis, a collection of Imperial pronouncements issued from 529 to 534 by order of (Eastern) Roman Emperor Justinian I, comprising:
  - Codex Justinianus (the Justinian Code);
  - Digest (Roman law), a compendium or digest of juristic writings;
  - the Institutes of Justinian; and
  - the Novellae Constitutiones (the Novels of Justinian)
- Canadian Judicial Council, the regulating body for Canadian judges composed mostly of chief justices and associate chief justices of Canada's superior courts
- Criminal Justice Commission (Australia), the former commission for investigating corruption and misconduct in Queensland, Australia

== Organizations ==
- Canadian Jewish Congress, a defunct umbrella group of Jewish organizations in Canada
- Collectives of Communist Youth, a juvenile Spanish Marxist–Leninist organization
- Community of Jesus' Compassion, an Anglican religious order founded in 1993

== Education ==
- California Jazz Conservatory, a music conservatory in Berkeley, California.
- Catholic Junior College, a junior college in Singapore
- Central Johannesburg College, a South African college founded in September 2001
- Cisco Junior College, a community college located one mile north of Cisco, Texas
- College of Journalism and Communications, a college of the University of Florida
- Confédération des jeunes chercheurs (French: "Confederation of Young Researchers"), a national postgraduate representative body
- Cornway Junior College, a private, co-educational, day and boarding school in Zimbabwe.
- Cor Jesu College, a Catholic educational institution in Davao del Sur, Philippines

== Other meanings ==
- Canadian Journal of Chemistry, a scientific journal published by the National Research Council of Canada
- CjC, an alias for electronic musician Conor J Curran
- Utah Children's Justice Center, These centers coordinates investigation and prosecution of child abuse, especially child sexual abuse
- The IATA code for El Loa Airport in Calama, Chile
- The ICAO code for Colgan Air, a US airline operating between 1991 and 2012
