= Order of the Companions of Martha and Mary =

The Order of the Companions of Martha and Mary (OCMM) is an Anglican religious order. Founded in 2010, it is currently the newest religious community within the Church of England.

== Foundation ==
The first two sisters of the Order, Sr Sue and Sr Judith, took their vows in Blackburn Cathedral on 3 August 2010. The sisters lived originally at Mellor, Lancashire, where they were involved in the running of the parish church of Mellor. Adapting the custom of primitive Christian religious communities for women, the Superior of the Order bears the title Amma, an Arabic word for 'mother'.

== Community house ==
The community left Mellor in the summer of 2016 and relocated to St Joseph's House of Prayer, in Tunstall, Lancashire (near Kirkby Lonsdale), a tiny community with a population of only slightly more than 100 people. They offer a series of organised retreats and spiritual exercises, and also hospitality for private retreat.

== Sister community ==
Although the Orders are separate and independent of each other, the Order of the Companions of Martha and Mary has a special link with the Society of the Sisters of Bethany (SSB), an Augustinian religious community of sisters based in Southsea.
