= Chita che Zvipo Zve Moto =

Anglican religious order in Zimbabwe

The Chita che Zvipo Zve Moto (Community of the Gifts of the Holy Fire), CZM, is an Anglican religious order of nuns and friars based in Gokwe Centre, Zimbabwe. Founded in 1977, the order is a part of the Anglican Church of the Province of Central Africa. Since its establishment, two daughter houses have been established. Their mission is wide-ranging, but with a special emphasis on caring for orphans.
