= Vincentian Studies Institute =

Roman Catholic organization to promote the Vincentian Family

The Vincentian Studies Institute of the United States (VSI) is an American Catholic research outfit at DePaul University in Chicago, Illinois. It promotes research on the Vincentian Family.

The Institute, founded in 1979, is sponsored by the ten provinces of the Congregation of the Mission (the Lazarists or Vincentians) and the Company of the Daughters of Charity in the United States. The Institute's mission is to promote a living interest in the historical, spiritual and charitable heritage of the Vincentian family in following Jesus Christ, the Evangelizer of the Poor and the source and model of all charity, under the patronage of Saint Vincent de Paul, (1581–1660) and Saint Louise de Marillac, (1591–1660). The Institute is now sponsored by DePaul University and is part of the university’s Office of Mission and Values.

The Institute publishes a bi-annual academic journal entitled Vincentian Heritage, a scholarly monograph series, and a wide variety of translations and original works in the Vincentian tradition.

The organization periodically offers continuing education opportunities and symposia, and also collaborates with a variety of other programs intended to promote a greater understanding of the Vincentian history and tradition.

== Origins ==
The origin of the Vincentian Studies Institute can be found in the Second Vatican Council's mandate that religious communities renew themselves in light of the "signs of the times." The council suggested that this renewal take place within the context of a careful self-reflection on the charism by each community.

A more remote origin of the Institute can be found in the work done by a variety of French Vincentian historians beginning in the mid-nineteenth century after the Congregation of the Mission's post-revolutionary restoration. The fourteenth superior general, Jean-Baptiste Étienne (1801–1874), had a lively concern for the preservation of the "primitive spirit" of the Vincentians and Daughters of Charity. He and his successors commissioned a variety of materials including the Annales de la Congrégation de la Mission, editions of selected letters of Vincent de Paul, editions of community documents, and a multi-volume history of the Congregation of the Mission. Confreres such as Gabriel Perboyre, Jean-Baptiste Pémartin, Félix Contassot, Jean Parrang, Fernand Combaluzier, Pierre Coste, and André Dodin are representatives of this French school of Vincentian historiography. Their labors established the foundation for all contemporary work in Vincentian studies.

In the early 1970s there was an attempt to found an organization similar to what would become the Vincentian Studies Institute. The inspiration for this idea was the Jesuit Historical Institute in Rome and the Academy of American Franciscan History then located in Bethesda, Maryland. The idea was that the American Vincentians should have a similar organization. The Provincial and Vice-Provincials of the western region of the United States initially accepted this proposal but, for reasons that are not entirely clear, nothing came of it at that time.

In 1973, the Very Reverend James Richardson, C.M., the superior general of the Congregation of the Mission and the Company of the Daughters of Charity, met with the Visitors (provincial superiors) of the United States provinces. He requested that they undertake a new translation into modern American English of the correspondence, conferences and documents of Saint Vincent de Paul. This meant of course the translation of Pierre Coste's monumental fourteen volume French edition originally published from 1920-1926. This new edition would also include those materials discovered since the Coste translation.

After the 1974 General Assembly of the Congregation of the Mission Reverend Richardson established the Group International d'Etudes Vincentiennes (G.I.E.V.). Two American confreres, including John Carven, C.M. (USA East) and Stafford Poole, C.M. (USA West), were involved in this effort. The objectives of this organization were: (1) to promote scientific Vincentian studies and assure their dissemination; (2) to make known Vincentian thought and spirituality; and (3) to help the members of the Vincentian Community learn more about their heritage.

The organization proved unsatisfactory, in part because of a lack of clarity about its purpose and functioning and the infrequency of its meetings. Because of displeasure with it, a revised organization was proposed and approved by the General Assembly of the Congregation of the Mission in 1980. It was known as the Secrétariat International d'Etudes Vincentiennes (S.I.E.V.), and is still in existence.

== Foundation, growth and membership ==
In 1978, at an annual G.I.E.V. meeting held at Niagara University, New York, a number of representatives of the North American Provinces attended, including Reverends John Carven, C.M. (USA East), Stafford Poole, C.M. (USA West), James King, C.M. (USA East), Frederick Easterly, C.M. (USA East), William Eigel, C.M. (USA Midwest), John Rybolt, C.M. (USA Midwest) and Douglas Slawson, C.M. (USA West). These confreres had the idea of forming a national organization for the study of Vincentian history and spirituality. They felt that a national version of the international organization would be better able to serve the needs of the United States provinces. There was also discussion of a possible role in the organization for the Daughters of Charity.

A preliminary proposal was drawn up and submitted to the Vincentian Conference (composed of the five United States Visitors) in October 1978. The response was favorable, and the organizers were authorized to have two meetings in which to draft a constitution, bylaws, and prepare a preliminary budget. The two organizational meetings were held at Kenrick Seminary in Saint Louis, Missouri (November 1978), and Mater Dei Provincial House, Evansville, Indiana (March 1979). Out of these meetings came the Constitution and Bylaws approved by the Vincentian Conference in October 1979. The following March the organization began its work with a meeting held at Saint John's Seminary College, Camarillo, California.

The first election for a presiding officer resulted in a tie. Since the newly adopted constitution did not provide for this eventuality, the choice was decided by a flip of the coin. The late Reverend Frederick Easterly, C.M. (USA East) thus became the first presiding officer of the Vincentian Studies Institute. During the mid-1980s and early 1990s, Reverend John Rybolt, C.M. (USA Midwest) served three terms as Presiding Officer. In 1993, Reverend Edward Udovic, C.M., succeeded him as Presiding Officer.

At the beginning of the Institute each of the five Vincentian provinces appointed members and provided annual funding. In 1982, the Visitatrixes of the United States provinces of the Daughters of Charity agreed to appoint sisters representing their provinces to the group without, however, accepting a formal role in sponsorship or funding. This arrangement would last for the next ten years. The organization has since met twice annually, in fall and spring, in various locations across the country. Until 1995, the headquarters of the Vincentian Studies Institute was located at Saint Mary's of the Barrens in Perryville, Missouri.

A major change in the Institute's governance took place in 1992 when the five United States provinces of the Daughters of Charity agreed to join the five Vincentian provinces as the organization's corporate sponsors. Corporately becoming the Institute's "Governing Body" the ten provincial superiors approved a new set of constitutions and bylaws in 1994. The Governing Body meets annually to review the work of the Institute, its performance, strategic plan, and to approve its budget.

At the same time the organization created a category of at-large membership to allow for members in addition to those appointed by the respective provincial superiors as representatives of the ten provinces. The terms for all members are five years and are renewable. In the fall of 2000 the Institute welcomed its first at-large member from outside the Congregation of the Mission and the Daughters of Charity: Sister Regina Bechtle, S.C., of the Sisters of Charity of New York. In 2002, Dr. Simone Zurawski of the Department of Art and Art History at DePaul University joined the Institute as its first lay at-large member.

Over the years the Institute's work has been made possible by a succession of members representing the various provinces. Several of these former members have died including, Reverends Frederick Easterly, C.M. (USA East), William Eigel, C.M. (USA Midwest), James King, C.M. (USA East), Warren Dicharry, C.M. (USA South), Frederic Braakhuis, C.M. (USA Midwest); Sisters Mary Basil Roarke, D.C. (USA Northeast), Hilda McGinnis, D.C. (USA West), Jacqueline Kilar, D.C. (USA Southeast), and Virginia Kingsbury, D.C. (USA East Central).

== Move to Chicago ==
In 1995, the headquarters of the Vincentian Studies Institute relocated to the John T. Richardson Library of DePaul University in Chicago, Illinois. The library was dedicated in September of 1992. The university donates office, storage and inventory space, and provides support and technology services. The V.S.I. organizational archives are now also housed at the university's archives. In 1997, with the retirement of the Executive Secretary Gerry Hartel and the editor Reverend Stafford Poole, C.M., the Institute hired Mr. Nathaniel Michaud to serve as Publications Editor and Executive Director.

== Collaboration with DePaul University ==
Also in 1995, with the closing of the Midwest Province's Saint Thomas Theological Seminary in Denver, Colorado, the Vincentian history and spirituality sections of the seminary library were donated to the Vincentian Studies Institute. In 2001, the remaining Vincentian volumes from the seminary library collection at Saint Mary's of the Barrens in Perryville, Missouri, were transferred to the V.S.I. library at DePaul. The Richardson Library at the university maintains this non-circulating research collection. The Institute continues to add newly published Vincentian titles.

For its part DePaul University has the institutional goal of becoming the premier international site for Vincentian Studies. The mission synergies afforded both to the university and the Institute by its presence at DePaul are wide-ranging. The library's Special Collections division has established a collection of rare and out-of-print Vincentian volumes to complement the V.S.I. Library. As a part of this collection is a section called "Vincent's reading list." These works are those specifically mentioned by Vincent in his extant correspondence or conferences. There is also a Vincentiana Collection dedicated to material items that reflect Vincentian culture and experience over the centuries as experienced on a day-to-day basis. Also in 2001, the Midwest Province of the Congregation of the Mission relocated its DeAndreis-Rosati Memorial Archives to the university as part of this Vincentian research center.

== The Vincentian Heritage Journal ==
The mission adopted by the Vincentian Studies Institute was to "promote a living interest in the Vincentian Heritage." The organization began its work with the publication of a journal entitled Vincentian Heritage. From 1979-1982 the Institute published one issue per year. Beginning in 1983 it began appearing bi-annually. The first editor was Reverend John Carven, C.M. (USA East). Reverend Stafford Poole, C.M. (USA West) succeeded him in 1986. In 1997, the Institute hired its first lay editor, Mr. Michaud.

Over the last twenty-five years 42 issues of Vincentian Heritage have appeared, representing the work of 133 authors, and totaling 5,574 pages. The journal has published two commemorative issues, dedicated to the Very Reverends William Slattery, C.M. (the 19th superior general from 1947–1968) and James Richardson, C.M. (the 20th superior general 1968-1981) at the time of their deaths. Three issues have been dedicated to the papers given at various national symposia, and one featured the papers of a Vincentian Heritage symposium held at DePaul University, Chicago, in 1992. In collaboration with the Sisters of Charity Federation in the Vincentian-Setonian tradition the Vincentian Heritage has published two issues dedicated to papers delivered at national Seton symposia.

The journal's title was changed from Vincentian Heritage to Vincentian Studies beginning with publication of volume 39 in 2025.

== Other publications ==
After several years concentrating on the journal's development, the Institute undertook a new phase of its research and publishing mission in 1987 by sponsoring the reprint of Joseph Leonard's English translation of Coste's three-volume biography of Saint Vincent. In 1989, the Institute published two popular histories of the Congregation of the Mission and the Daughters of Charity in the United States. These were followed in 1993 by the first English annotated translation of Louis Abelly's 1664 biography of Saint Vincent de Paul.

These works have in subsequent years been followed by the publication of other translations, reprints, magazines and original research in Vincentian history and spirituality. This latter group included the 1995 Paulist Press publication of Vincent de Paul and Louise de Marillac: Rules, Conferences, Writings. This volume was co-edited by Reverend John Rybolt, C.M. (USA Midwest) and Sister Frances Ryan, D.C. (USA East Central).

The V.S.I. has also undertaken two archival microfilming projects producing microfilm editions of the Annales de la Congrégation de la Mission, as well as materials in the archives of the General Curia of the Congregation of the Mission in Rome concerning the United States provinces.

In 2006-07 the Institute published A Vincentian Guide to France, a comprehensive look at important Vincentian Family sites in the country of Vincent’s birth, by Rev. John Rybolt, C.M.

== Monograph Series ==
In 1996, the Institute published Sister Betty Ann McNeil, D.C.'s (USA Emmitsburg Province) monograph, The Vincentian Family Tree. This first-ever "genealogical" study of "Institutes of Consecrated Life, Societies of Apostolic Life, Lay Associations and Non-Catholic Religious institutes in the Vincentian Tradition" was a significant contribution to the development of national and international Vincentian family relationships. This work represented the first of a planned series of scholarly monographs to be published periodically by the Institute.

The second monograph published in 2001 was Rev. Edward Udovic, C.M.'s, Jean-Baptiste Étienne and the Vincentian Revival. The third monograph, authored by Rev. John Rybolt, C.M., was entitled Frontier Missionary: Felix de Andreis, C.M. 1778-1820 Correspondence and Historical Writings, and was released in 2005. In 2007 the Institute published a biographical study by Sister Louise Sullivan, D.C. (USA Northeast), titled Sister Rosalie Rendu: A Daughter of Charity On Fire with Love for the Poor. Projected future volumes include, among others, Rev. Udovic's translation and annotated edition of Henri de Maupas du Tour's November 1660 funeral oration for Saint Vincent de Paul.

== Continuing education ==
As the 1980s drew to a close the Institute explored new avenues of fulfilling its mission: particularly in the area of continuing education. In June 1989, the organization sponsored a national symposium entitled: The Age of Gold: The Roots of Our Tradition. This event, which examined the French spiritual roots of the Vincentian tradition, took place at Saint Mary's of the Barrens in Perryville, Missouri. Two years later, in 1991, to mark the 400th anniversary of the birth of Saint Louise de Marillac, the Institute sponsored a second national symposium at Marillac Provincial House, Saint Louis, Missouri.

The next continuing education effort sponsored by the Institute began in June 1997. After extensive consultation, the membership determined that a pressing issue in contemporary Vincentian experience was mission-based leadership development. This led to the choice of the theme for the resulting national symposium: Vincentian National Leadership Symposium: Unfolding the Legacy of Our Mission. The effort proved so successful that the Institute repeated the symposium three times in November 1997, September 1998, and November 1999. This offering drew a wide representation from all branches of the Vincentian family. The organization is presently discerning a future direction for these Vincentian leadership development efforts especially in collaboration with the Hay Vincentian Leadership Institute at DePaul University in Chicago.

Evaluations of these programs have been uniformly high. A total of 459 members of the Vincentian Family have attended the six national symposia.

Recently, the Institute held a national symposium in Chicago for Vincentian archivists in conjunction with the celebration of its 25th anniversary in April 2004. The theme of the conference was Vincentian Archives for the 21st century: The Records of Our Past Look to Our Future.

== "Double Family" to the "Vincentian Family" ==
From its earliest continuing education initiatives, the Institute recognized a growing sense of connection among organizations sharing the Vincentian charism in the United States. Vincentians, the Daughters of Charity, and others gradually came to refer to this network as the "Vincentian Family." Over the past ten years, the Vincentian Studies Institute has expanded its mission beyond serving the more limited "Double Family" to embracing the broader national and international Vincentian Family. In doing so, the Institute has played a leading role in promoting and strengthening this wider Vincentian community.

In the summer of 2003 the Institute sponsored its first Vincentian Family Heritage Tour to sites associated with Vincent de Paul and Louise de Marillac in Paris and throughout France. The thirty-five participants represented many branches of the Vincentian family in the United States. The success of this first effort has led to successive tour offerings.

Within the last several years the Institute made a commitment to foster collaborative ties with the Ladies of Charity, the Society of Saint Vincent de Paul, and the Sisters of Charity Federation in the Vincentian-Setonian tradition. Sister Sheila O'Friel, D.C. (USA Northeast), has concentrated on the Ladies of Charity and the Saint Vincent de Paul Society, while Sister Betty Ann McNeil, D.C. (USA Emmitsburg Province), has worked with the Sisters of Charity Federation in the Vincentian-Setonian tradition. The Presiding Officer also attends the annual meeting of the heads of the Vincentian Family in the United States.

== Research grants ==
Beginning in the late 1980s the V.S.I. provided occasional grants to support Vincentian research projects. A number of confreres, sisters, and lay scholars took advantage of this grant opportunity to support their Vincentian research, writing and publication. Since 2002 the Institute has expanded this program, offering up to $15,000 in grants annually. Two typical grants awarded in the recent past include: Sister Betty Ann McNeil's demographic study of the entrants into the Sisters of Charity of Saint Joseph in Emmitsburg, Maryland, from 1809 to 1850, and the Daughters of Charity of Saint Vincent de Paul, United States Province (1850–1909); and Dr. Richard J. Janet of Rockhurst University in Kansas City, Missouri, who is researching for a book tentatively titled: In Missouri's Wilds: A History of Saint Mary's of the Barrens Seminary and College 1818-2000.

== On the web ==
In 1998 the Institute's web site first made its appearance, and it has grown exponentially in scope and depth over the years. DePaul University hosts the site. Regularly updated, the site provides in-depth information about the V.S.I.'s mission and its activities. After its 1995 move to Chicago, the Institute experimented with a variety of outsourcing options for the bookstore operations. Since 2007 the Barnes & Noble has managed this e-commerce enterprise.

== Transition: The V.S.I. at DePaul University ==
Through a prayerful discernment with the V.S.I. membership, the institute’s Governing Body concluded in 2006 that the time for a transition in sponsorship had arrived. An institutional candidate to take over sponsorship was immediately apparent: DePaul University.

Given the long association of the Institute with DePaul, and given DePaul’s own Vincentian mission and institutional commitment to the Vincentian Heritage all sides readily agreed as to the desirability of this move. DePaul, for its part, pledged the financial resources to support the Institute as part of the university’s Office of Mission and Values, and also pledged to continue its traditional mission and forms of outreach to the wider Vincentian family in the United States. Both an editorial board and an advisory board have been established to help guide the Institute as it becomes part of the university on 1 July 2007.
