= Order of Julian of Norwich =

Anglican religious order

The Order of Julian of Norwich
- Our Lady of the Northwoods Monastery
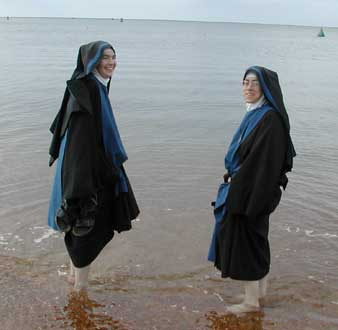
- Two nuns from the order
- Formation: 1985; 41 years ago
- Type: Anglican religious order
- Location: White Lake, Wisconsin, U.S.
- Coordinates: 45°9′2″N 88°40′20″W
- Members: Episcopal Church
- Website: www.orderofjulian.org

The Order of Julian of Norwich (OJN) is a contemplative community of nuns in the Episcopal Church. It has EIN 06-1083614 as a 501(c)(3) Public Charity.

== History ==
The Order was founded in Connecticut in 1985, under the inspiration of the priest John Swanson (known by his religious name, Fr John-Julian OJN). The Episcopal Church formally recognised the Order in 1997. The Order relocated to Waukesha, Wisconsin, where Julian House Monastery was gradually extended. The Order again relocated, this time in 2015, to White Lake, Wisconsin. The community is semi-enclosed and the focus of their life together is on prayer, contemplation, and manual labor. Since 2010, the Guardian (elected superior of the community) has been Reverend Mother Hilary OJN. In 2021, following the death of John-Julian, the enclosed community became all-female. Oblate and associate affiliation remains open to men and women.

== Julian House Monastery ==
Originally occupying a single house with an adjacent chapel, the community engaged in extensive fundraising to extend the monastic buildings, and engaged with local contractors to construct an ecologically sensitive building. The house and chapel are now joined, and further extensions have provided community work rooms, additional cells, and facilities for caring for elderly members of the community. Amongst other eco-friendly features, the monastery generates its own solar electricity, harvests rainwater through a water management system, and engages in extensive market gardening and sustainable land husbandry.

== Spiritual life ==
The nuns of the Order lead lives balanced in prayer, work, and recreation. They rise at 3:30am, pray a four-fold daily office, celebrate a daily mass, and engage in individual and community works; their day ends with compline (night prayer) at 7:00pm. Professed sisters take the three traditional Benedictine vows: stability, conversion of life, and obedience "in the spirit of our Blessed Mother Saint Julian".
