= Chita che Zita Rinoyera =

Anglican religious order in Zimbabwe

The Chita che Zita Rinoyera (Community of the Holy Name), CZR, is an Anglican religious order of women headquartered in Mutare, Zimbabwe, in the Anglican Church of the Province of Central Africa. The community was established in 1935 by the English Community of the Resurrection. Members of the community work in health care and teaching, and also provide goods and services to parish churches throughout Zimbabwe. They also have an orphanage that cares for about seventy children. Since the 1980s, CZR has seeded three new communities in various places in Zimbabwe.

It is not to be confused with the Community of the Holy Name (CHN), which is active in England, Lesotho and Zululand, or with the Community of the Holy Name (CHN) in Australia.
