= Friar =

Member of a mendicant Christian order

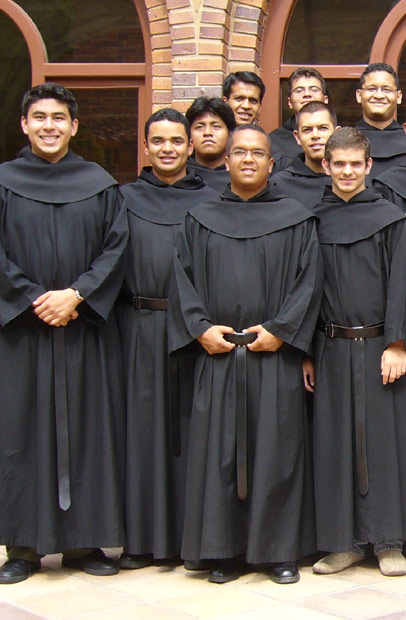
A group of friars; novices of the Order of Augustinian Recollects at the Monastery of Monteagudo in 2006

A friar is a member of one of the mendicant orders in the Catholic Church. There are also friars outside of the Catholic Church, such as within the Evangelical-Lutheran Churches and Anglican Communion. The term, first used in the 12th or 13th century, distinguishes the mendicants' itinerant apostolic character, exercised broadly under the jurisdiction of a superior general, from the older monastic orders' allegiance to a single monastery formalized by their vow of stability. A friar may be in holy orders or be a non-ordained brother. The most significant orders of friars are the Dominicans, Franciscans, Augustinians, and Carmelites.

== Definition ==
Friars are different from monks in that they are called to the great evangelical counsels (vows of poverty, chastity, and obedience) in service to society, rather than through asceticism and devotion in a cloister. Whereas monks live in a self-sufficient community, friars work among laypeople and are supported by donations or other charitable support. Monks or nuns make their vows and commit to a particular community in a particular place. Friars commit to a community spread across a wider geographical area known as a province and so they will typically move around, spending time in different houses of the community within their province.

== Etymology ==
The English term friar is derived from the Norman French word frere (brother), from the Latin frater (brother), which was widely used in the Latin New Testament to refer to members of the Christian community. Fray is sometimes used in Spain and former Spanish colonies such as the Philippines or the American Southwest as a title, such as in Fray Juan de Torquemada.

== Orders ==
In the Catholic church, there are two classes of orders known as friars, or mendicant orders: the four great orders and the so-called lesser orders.

=== Major orders ===
The four great orders were mentioned by the Second Council of Lyons (1274):

- The Carmelites, founded c. 1155. They are also known as the White Friars because of the white cloak which covers their brown habit. They received papal approval from Honorius III in 1226 and later by Innocent IV in 1247. The Carmelites were founded as a purely contemplative order, but became mendicants in 1245. There are two types of Carmelites, those of the Ancient Observance (OCarm) and those of the Discalced Carmelites (OCD), founded by St. Teresa of Ávila in the 16th century.

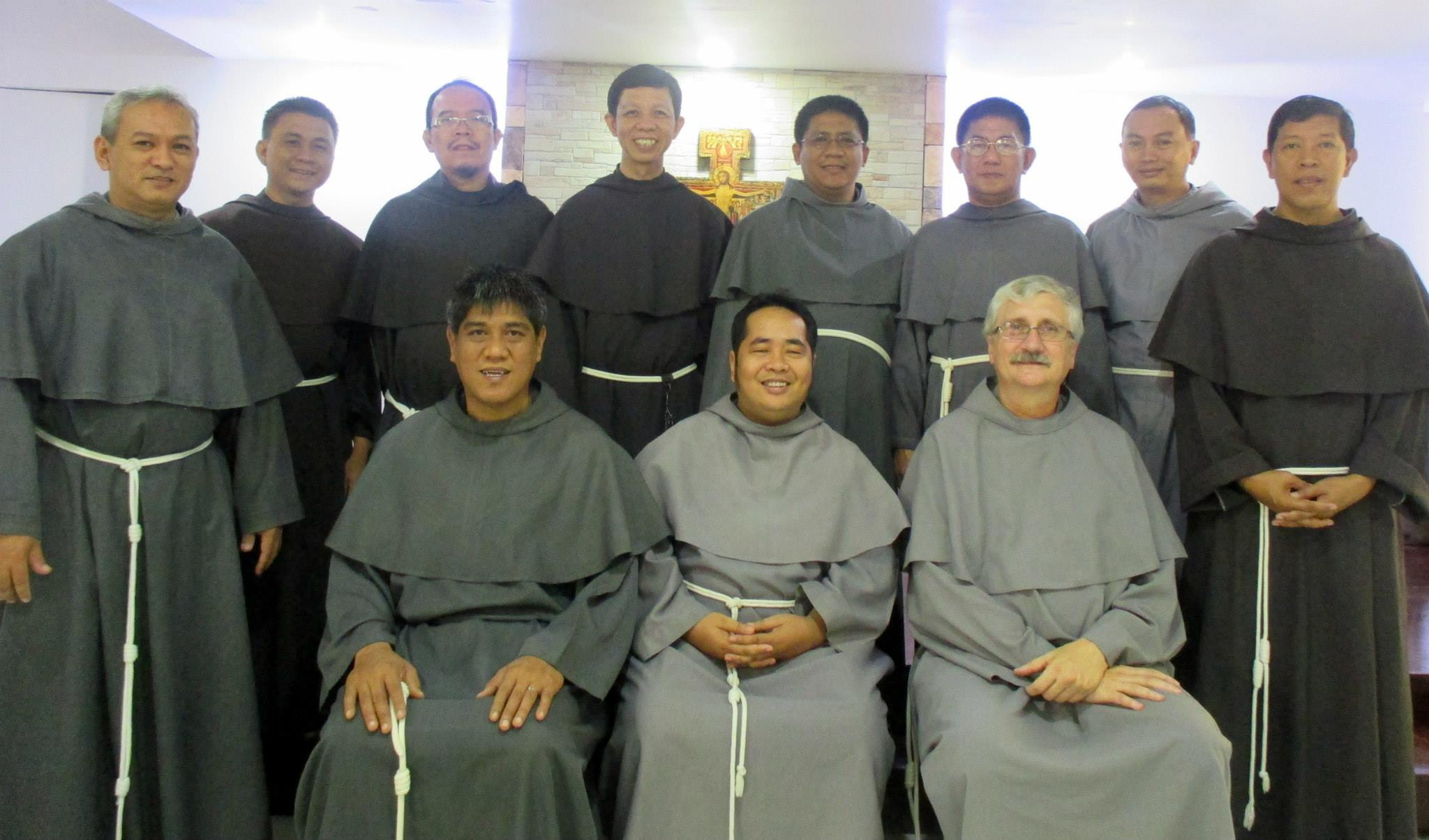
Conventual Franciscans in their variant grey habits

- The Franciscans, founded in 1209. They are also known as the Friars Minor. The Franciscans were founded by St. Francis of Assisi and received oral papal approval by Innocent III in 1209 and formal papal confirmation by Honorius III in 1223. Today the Friars Minor is composed of three branches: the Order of Friars Minor (Brown Franciscans), Order of Friars Minor Capuchin (Brown Friars with long pointed hoods) and the Order of Friars Minor Conventual wearing grey or black habits (thus known as Grey Friars). In the Franciscan order, a friar may be an ordained priest or a religious brother.
- The Dominicans, founded c. 1216. They are also known as the Friar Preachers or the Black Friars from the black mantle (cappa) worn over their white habit. The Dominicans were founded by St. Dominic and received papal approval from Honorius III in 1216 as the Ordo Praedicatorum under the Rule of St. Augustine. They became a mendicant order in 1221. There are also Dominican Orders within the Anglican Communion, such as the Order of Christ the Saviour.
- The Augustinians, founded in 1244 (the "Little Union") and enlarged in 1256 (the Grand Union). They are also known as the Hermits of St. Augustine or the Austin Friars. Their rule is based on the writings of Augustine of Hippo. The Augustinians were assembled from various groups of hermits as a mendicant order by Pope Innocent IV in 1244 (Little Union). Additional groups were added by Alexander IV in 1256 (Grand Union).

=== Lesser orders ===
Some of the lesser orders are:

- The Trinitarians, established in 1198
- The Mercedarians, established in 1218
- The Servites, established in 1240
- The Minims, established in 1474
- The Third Order Regular of St. Francis, a branch of the Third Order of St. Francis, part of the Franciscan Order established in 1447
- The Discalced Carmelites, established in 1568
- The Order of Augustinian Recollects, established in 1598 through the Chapter of Toledo
- The Discalced Trinitarians, established in 1599
- The Order of Penance, established in 1781.

=== Order of Malta ===
In the Sovereign Military Order of Malta the term Fra' (an abbreviation for the Latin word frater meaning 'brother') is used when addressing the professed Knights of Justice who have taken vows.

== Other Christian traditions ==
Orders of friars (and sisters) exist in other Christian traditions, including the Order of Lutheran Franciscans, the Order of Ecumenical Franciscans and the Order of Lesser Sisters and Brothers. In the Anglican Communion there are also a number of mendicant groups such as the Anglican Friars Preachers, the Society of Saint Francis and the Order of St Francis.

== Historical duties ==
Beginning under the Papacy of Gregory IX, friars of the Dominican and Franciscan mendicant orders were asked to serve in armies as religious preachers and chaplains. These roles were traditionally held by Bishops during the early Middle Ages, but as European armies grew larger, they became unable to hear the confessions of thousands of soldiers As both the Dominican and Franciscan orders grew in popularity after their acknowledgements by the Papacy in 1210 and 1216 respectively, the number of priests grew to support the needs of Ad Liberandum, the papal bull which outlines the duties the Catholic priesthood performs during crusade. These duties included hearing confession, administering sacrament, and assigning penances.

During the campaign of William II in Germany during the mid 1200s, Papal legate Reinerus of Viterbo wrote letters to pope Innocent IV, noting the lengths to which the mendicant friars would go to deliver last rites to fallen soldiers, entering the battlefield even after Conrad IV ordered their execution upon capture.

Philosopher and Dominican friar Thomas Aquinas encouraged mendicants to provide spiritual support and guidance to soldiers on campaign, written in his work the Summa Theologiae. Aquinas references the Old Testament, citing a chapter in the book of Joshua where priests blow horns during battle. Aquinas compares the blowing of the horns to the spiritual support that mendicants can provide to the soldiers, though he stressed that under no circumstances should a priest bear arms and participate in the conflict itself.

Friars have also been known to act as agents of the inquisition, travelling to isolated regions and seeking out heretics to be tried before secular or papal authorities. Dominican friars were most common of any mendicant order represented, likely as author Holly Grieco describes their founder Saint Dominic was known for his preaching against heretics in southern Toulouse. Greico further ascribes the Dominicans prominent inquisitorial presence to their particularly learned nature, allowing them to adequately convince laymen and reestablish papal doctrine.

While many mendicant friars take vows of poverty, the priories or convents where they live, eat, and preach still require financial upkeep. Friars often sustain themselves on donations from a variety of people across the economic spectrum, from the common layman to the merchant class or even the nobility. Authors Tarryn Chub and Francisco García-Serrano articulate that friars in the Mediterranean countries, including Italy and Spain, played host to their various patrons to facilitate trade and economic growth. Friars, particularly Franciscan and Dominican of merchant background, preached in favor of mercantilism as opposed to the traditionally hostile attitude of the Catholic church. Notable proponents of mercantilism and commerce were Thomas Aquinas and Ramón de Penyafort.

== Historical persecution ==
In response to various political or religious events, Friars have been subjects to violence, mockery, and political oppression. Assaults on friars and other mendicant groups across Europe were stable yet infrequent in the late Middle Ages, most common in regions where friars acted in Inquisitorial positions like northern Italy and southern France. The majority of these assaults happened in urban areas, carried out in most part by mobs, not individuals. though there were several cases to the contrary. Cases of friars and mendicants being assaulted on the roads were rare, likely due in part to their impoverished lifestyle, and that monks would travel in groups when able.

Far more common than death or lasting harm, in unwelcome places monks were more commonly publicly mocked, shamed, or ignored. In his travels to Germany, Franciscan chronicler Jordan of Giano writes of an incident where travelling friars were beaten, stripped of their clothes, and imprisoned before being mocked by the public. Violence against friars noticeably increases during periods of anti-Catholic sentiment and religious conflict.

In the late 1500s, the city of Ghent accused several mendicant Friars of sodomy or homosexual behaviors. Beginning in 1578, these trials would result in the incarceration, exile, and execution of more than a dozen friars. These trials were part of a larger anti-monastic sentiment across northern Europe and the Holy Roman Empire, in part spread by author Martin Luther, who in several of his speeches and writings associated the Catholic clergy with the practice of sodomy. This practice of association would be continued through following protestant writers by the likes of Henri Estienne, John Bale and John Foxe. Two years later in 1580, 5 friars were killed, and their monasteries were looted and burned after Calvinists took control of the city of Malines.

== Other usage of the term ==
Several high schools, as well as Providence College, founded by the Dominicans, use friars as their school mascot.

The Major League Baseball team San Diego Padres have the Swinging Friar (padre is also a Spanish word for the priestly title 'father'; in 1769 San Diego was founded by Spanish Franciscan friars under Junípero Serra).

The University of Michigan's oldest a cappella group is a male octet known as The Friars. The University of Pennsylvania has a senior honor society known as Friars. Sports teams at Father Dueñas Memorial School on the island of Guam are known as the Friars.
