= Anglican Order of Preachers =

Anglican religious order

The Anglican Order of Preachers is an Anglican religious order sometimes loosely referred to as "Dominicans".

The order was founded in the United States during the late 1990s by Episcopal priest The Reverend Dr. Jeffery Mackey but traces its spiritual heritage back to Catholic priest Saint Dominic de Guzmán in the 13th century. The religious community does not have any official ties to the Roman Catholic Order of Preachers founded by Saint Dominic and approved by Pope Honorius III in 1216. The group is a recognized "Christian community" in the Episcopal Church in the United States. This Christian community can be found across the worldwide Anglican Communion and includes men and women (married, celibate, ordained, and lay) modeled along a third order rule.

Members of the order must be baptized, confirmed, and in communion with the Archbishop of Canterbury; however, oblates and associates may affiliate with the order and belong to any Christian body of the faithful. The friars and sisters live under a common rule of life and vows of simplicity, purity, and obedience. The spirituality of the order rests upon four pillars: prayer, community, study, and preaching. The order seeks to capture the spirit of St. Dominic's original 13th-century preaching movement within the varied contemporary settings of its members. The order is a diasporic community spread throughout the world and does not currently own any property. Members are organized within "houses" based on geographic regions and are led by priors. Friars and sisters of the Order gather once a year for chapter to celebrate the Feast of Saint Dominic and regularly at mid-year house meetings. Those living in closer proximity often gather more frequently for fellowship and shared mission.
