= Worker Sisters of the Holy Spirit =

Anglican international covenant community

The Worker Sisters of the Holy Spirit (WSHS) is an international covenant community in the Episcopal Church which offers women, regardless of marital status, a path for spiritual growth. It is a registered charity.

== History ==
The community was founded in December 1972 in the Episcopal Diocese of West Missouri by Sr. Angela, a nun in a traditional Anglican religious order who left to found an organization that would offer a rule of life for lay women who lived separately and worked in the secular world. The name Worker Sisters of the Holy Spirit was chosen due to the community drawing inspiration from the worker priests of France.

== Charism ==
The charism of the Worker Sisters is to nurture the "Fruit of the Holy Spirit". To support this charism, they follow a Benedictine rule of life which includes scripture study, prayer, reflection, dedication to simplicity, and participation in mission and ministry. The fruit of the Holy Spirit is identified as love, joy, peace, patience, goodness, kindness, faithfulness, meekness, and self-control.

== Membership ==
Membership is made up of three orders which are bound together under a life commitment to a common rule. There are also companions and friends of the Worker Sisters. Young adults ages 13–25 may belong to any category of membership.

- 1st Order: Women - lay workers and lay sisters
- 2nd Order: Men - lay brothers and lay workers (Worker Brothers of the Holy Spirit)
- 3rd Order: Clergy
- Companions: Lay people and clergy
- Friends: Lay people and clergy
