= Community of St. Laurence =

- Formation: 1874
- Type: Religious

The Community of St. Laurence (CSL) is an Anglican religious order of nuns. Established in 1874, the order's house is located in Southwell, Nottinghamshire, England. The community was originally established to provide pastoral care, but now focuses more on retreat work and assisting at the cathedral of the Diocese of Southwell.
