= Order of St Benedict (Anglican) =

Anglican monastic orders

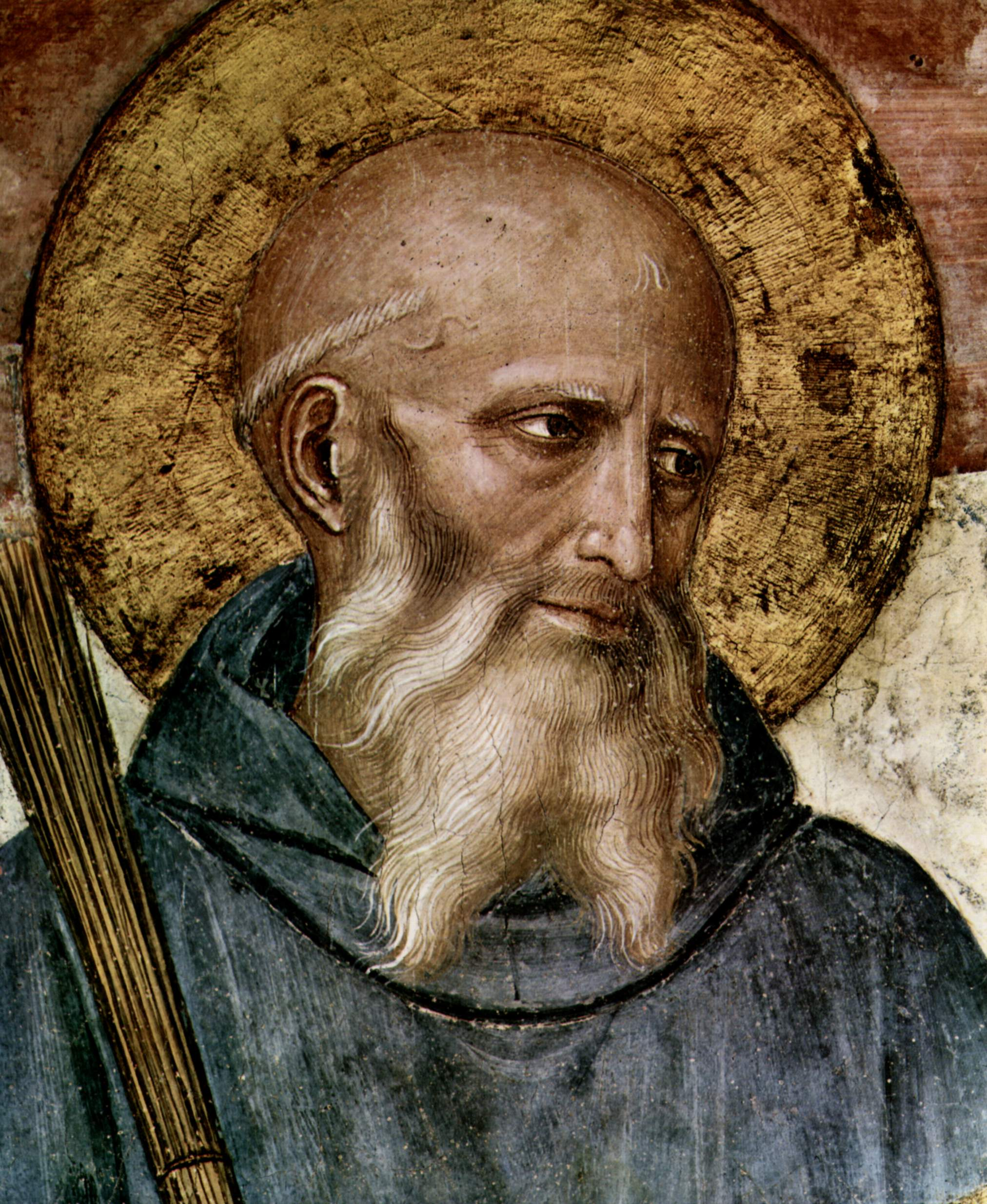
St Benedict of Nursia (c. 480–543), detail from a fresco by Fra Angelico, San Marco, Florence (c. 1400–1455).

There are a number of Benedictine Anglican religious orders, some of them using the name Order of St. Benedict (OSB). Just like their Roman Catholic counterparts, each abbey/priory/convent is independent of each other. The vows are not made to an order, but to a local incarnation of the order, hence each individual order is free to develop its own character and charism, yet each under a common rule of life after the precepts of St. Benedict. Most of the communities include a confraternity of oblates. The order consists of a number of independent communities.

== OSB Anglican Benedictine communities ==
=== Australia ===
- St Mark's Abbey, Camperdown, Victoria. Female and male order. Founded in 1975, with women since 1993.

=== England ===
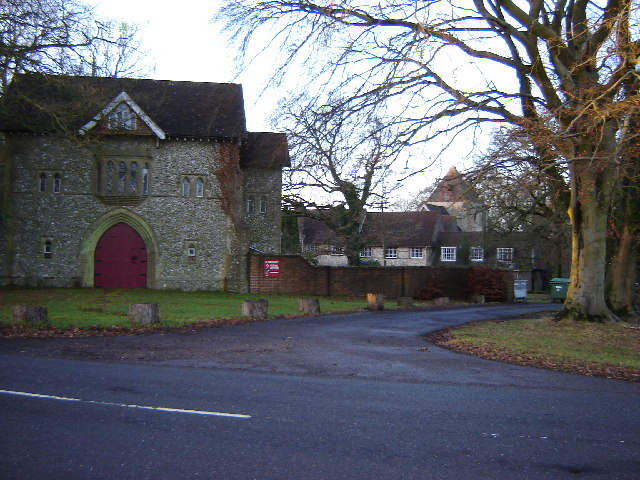
Alton Abbey

- Alton Abbey, Alton, Hampshire. Male order. Founded in 1884 as the Order of St Paul.
- Edgware Abbey (The Community of St. Mary at the Cross), Edgware, Greater London. Female order. Founded 1866; dedicated to stand with Mary, the mother of Jesus, at the cross, thus sharing in her commitment to embrace all people in Christ's love. Black tunic and scapular with modernised headdress, black veil, and leather belt. Over the years the community's work has evolved to meet the present needs of elderly frail people for nursing or residential care. This care provision continues in Henry Nihill House at Edgware Abbey, where Residents enjoy close links with the community, its worship and its life.
- Salisbury Priory, Salisbury, Wiltshire. Male order. Founded at Pershore 1914; resited at Nashdom Abbey, Buckinghamshire, 1926; resited at Elmore Abbey, Berkshire, 1987. In 2011 they relocated again to Salisbury.
- Malling Abbey, West Malling, Kent. Female order. Original foundation c. 1090. Re-founded in London 1891; resited to Somerset 1906; resited to West Malling 1916.
- Mucknell Abbey, Stoulton, Worcestershire. A mixed-sex abbey with an ecumenical focus founded in 1941, and previously located at Burford Priory.

=== Republic of Korea ===
- Busan, Korea. A convent of the Anglican Church of Korea founded in 1993.

=== United States ===
- Holy Cross West Priory Anglican Benedictines, Placentia, California. A Dispersed Benedictine Community of Brothers in the Anglo-Catholic tradition.
- Christ Mission Anglican Benedictines, Greensboro, North Carolina. A Dispersed Benedictine Monastic Community of both Brothers and Sisters.
- St. Gregory's Abbey, Three Rivers, Michigan. Male order. Founded at Valparaiso, Indiana, 1939, as a dependency of Nashdom Abbey (England); resited to Three Rivers 1949; independent abbey 1969.
- Orden de San Benito, Hialeah, FL. Male monks live at the primarily Spanish-speaking monastery. Traditional religious order, Anglo-Catholic in orientation. Clergy and lay; with lay members living dispersed. Founded July 2015 as an independent monastery in affiliation with the Continuing Evangelical Episcopal Communion.
- Companions of Our Lady of Walsingham (OSB). A non-cloistered Benedictine community of both men and women dedicated to the devotion to Our Lady of Walsingham.
- Companions of St. Luke (OSB). A non-cloistered community of both men and women; a non-traditional Christian Community of the Episcopal Church.
- Community of Divine Love. Men and women. Traditional religious order. Located in Los Angeles County.
- The Community of St. Joseph Male monks and male and female oblates. Anglo-Catholic in orientation, with special devotion to the Real Presence of Christ in the Eucharist as well as to the Blessed Virgin Mary. Mother house located in Natchez, Mississippi.
- House of Initia Nova, OSB, Male and female oblates, conversi, and vowed monastics. Provisionally recognized by the Episcopal Church (USA) on 21 December 2021.
- Monastery of the Resurrection (OSB), Flowery Branch, Georgia. Men only at the Monastery, men and women oblates. Three overseas priories.
- Society of St. Benedict (OSB), San Antonio, Texas. A dispersed Benedictine community open to lay and clergy members of the Anglican Diocese of All Nations.

== Other Anglican Benedictine communities ==
The following abbeys and communities follow the Benedictine Rule, but do not style themselves "OSB".

=== Canada ===
- Order of the Holy Cross (OHC), Toronto. Male order. Order founded 1884; adopted Rule of Benedict 1987; priory established 1973.

=== Cameroon ===
- Benedictine Sisters of Bethany (EBSB), Bamenda, Cameroon. Female order.

=== Ghana ===
- Order of the Holy Paraclete (OHP), Ahinsan. Female order. Founded 1915. Overseas, the Order's long-standing commitment to Africa has been extended in exciting new developments: raising awareness of Aids and providing a home for abused girls in Swaziland, and fostering vocations to religious life in Ghana and South Africa. In response to perceived local interest and support, two new convents have been built, one in Jachie, Ashanti, where there is also an Eye Clinic run by a Ghanaian member, the other in Johannesburg alongside St Benedict's House, the retreat and conference centre run by the Sisters.

=== South Africa ===
- Order of the Holy Cross (OHC), Grahamstown. Male order.

=== United Kingdom ===
- Community of the Holy Cross (CHC), Costock, Loughborough. Female order. Founded 1857 by Elizabeth Neale, sister of John Mason Neale, the hymnographer.
- Community of St. Peter, Horbury (CSPH), Wakefield. Female order. Following a revised Benedictine Rule since 1858.

=== Wales ===
- Holywell Community, Abergavenny, living in the spirit of St Benedict since 2013.

=== United States ===
- Brothers of St John the Evangelist, Freeland, WA.
- Order of the Holy Cross (OHC), West Park, New York.

== See also ==
- Gregory Dix
- Joseph Leycester Lyne
- Order of Saint Benedict
- Benedictine Confederation

== Bibliography ==
- Anglican Religious Life: 2008-9. Norwich: Canterbury Press, 2007.
