= St Mark's Abbey =

Monastery in Camperdown, Victoria, Australia

Coordinates: 38.251419°S 143.126404°E

St Mark's Abbey, Camperdown, is an Anglican Benedictine monastery situated in Victoria, Australia. It is a mixed community of both monks and nuns. The community was founded by the Right Reverend Dom Michael King OSB and had its origins in the parish of St Mark, Fitzroy, Victoria in 1975.

The main work of the monastery is the recitation of the Divine Office. The Eucharist is celebrated daily and time is given to lectio divina. Guests are received in the abbey's guesthouse. The abbey is known for its incense and replica icons. It supplies all of Australia’s major cathedrals and many parish churches with incense. A printery is also in operation.

The oblates of the monastery are found throughout Australia and New Zealand.

== Sources ==
- Anglican Religious Communities Yearbook: 2004-2005, Norwich, Canterbury Press, 2003.

== See also ==
- Order of St. Benedict (Anglican)
- Anglican religious order
