= Society of the Sisters of Bethany =

Anglican religious order

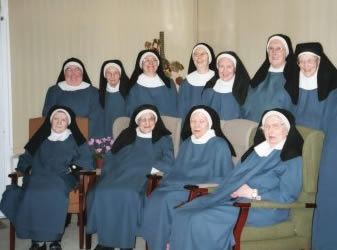
Sisters of Bethany in 2006

The Society of the Sisters of Bethany (SSB) is an Anglican religious order. The sisters follow the Rule of St Augustine. The mother house is now the House of Bethany in Southsea.

== Foundation ==
The community was founded in Clerkenwell, London, by Etheldreda Anna Benett (1824 – 1913) in 1866. Mother Etheldreda had been associated for some years with the Society of All Saints Sisters of the Poor, and finally joined that Order as a novice in 1864. In 1866 she took simple vows as a professed sister, and immediately left to found the new Order, the Society of the Sisters of Bethany. In the early days there was encouragement from founder members of the Oxford Movement including Edward Bouverie Pusey and Richard Meux Benson.

== Convents ==
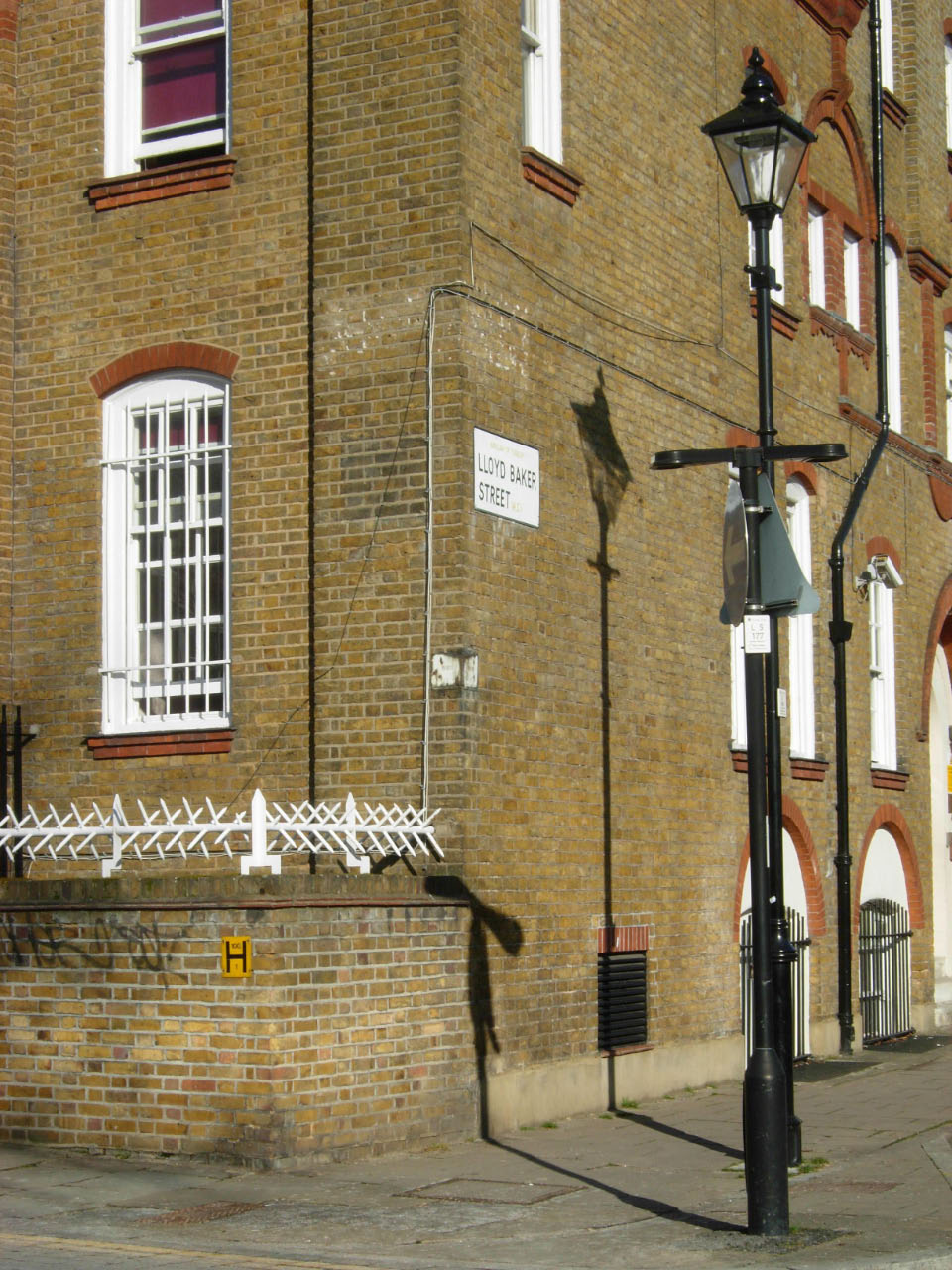
Bethany House, Clerkenwell

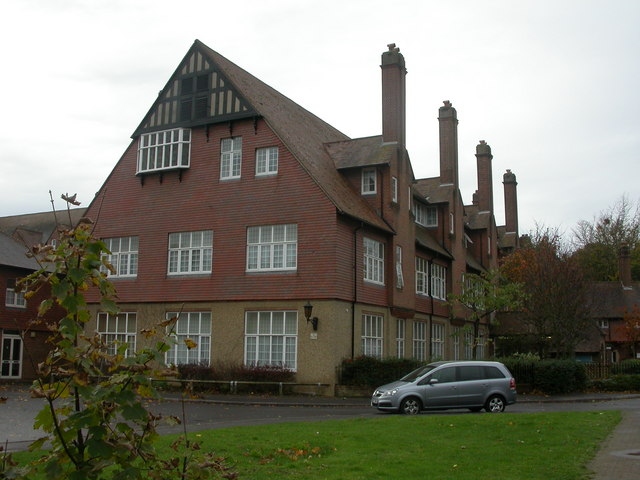
House of Bethany, Boscombe, Bournemouth

- The original mother house and main convent was at Lloyd Square, Clerkenwell in London from 1866 until its closure in 1962.
- The House of Bethany in Boscombe, Hampshire, opened in 1872 as a convent and orphanage; in 1962 it became the mother house of the Order; it closed in 1986.
- The House of Bethany in Hindhead opened in 1977 as a convent of the Order; it closed in 1998.
- A small convent in Winchester was opened in 1980; it closed in 1993.
- The House of Bethany in Southsea opened in 1987 and immediately became the Mother House.
- The House of Bethany in Moulton St Mary, Norfolk opened in November 2023 as a house of prayer; The Haven guest house opened in May 2025.

The Order has operated overseas convents in Urmia, Persian Kurdistan (1890-1898), and Plumstead, Cape Town, South Africa (1915-1950). At various times it has also had small groups of sisters stationed in diocesan retreat houses to help run those houses, in various dioceses of the Church of England.

== Vestments ==
The order specialised in the creation of vestments and ecclesiastical embroidery opening a School of Embroidery at Lloyd Square, Clerkenwell. The income from the School of Embroidery helped to fund the other work carried out by the Community. Sir Ninian Comper had a long association with the School which continued until 1972.

== Sister community ==
Although the Orders are separate and independent of each other, the Society of the Sisters of Bethany have a special link with the Order of the Companions of Martha and Mary (OCMM), a relatively new religious community of sisters based in Blackburn.

== Current life ==
Mother Mary Joy was installed as Reverend Mother of the Society by their episcopal visitor, Bishop Trevor Willmott in November 2019. As of 2019, there were seven professed sisters in the community, who continue their ministry of providing retreats, quiet days, and parish visiting. They also have a presence on Facebook and Twitter.

== See also ==
- Augustinian nuns in the Anglican Communion
- Benedictine Sisters of Bethany, a religious order for women within the Anglican Church in Cameroon, West Africa
- College of the Sisters of Bethany, a defunct women's college in Topeka, Kansas
