= Brotherhood of the Ascended Christ =

The Brotherhood of the Ascended Christ (BAC) is an Anglican religious order of the Church of North India, and is based in Delhi, India. Founded in 1877, the order was founded with a mission to serve the poor and underprivileged. In 1975, the Delhi Brotherhood Society was established to fund and organise social development projects in the city. These include community health, education, vocational training, and programmes for street and working children. The Brotherhood House operates a small retreat and conference centre.

Financial support for the Brotherhood's educational work has been provided by the Wye & Brook India Trust (a UK charity) since 1978.

Their ethnicity is mainly Indian, and the group of leaders within the order all grew up impoverished. Within the community of the Ascended Christ, the majority grew up in poverty.
