= Society of Our Lady of the Isles =

Coordinates: 60.734°N 0.958°W

The Society of Our Lady of the Isles (SOLI) is a small Anglican religious order for women, founded in the late 20th century. It is located in Shetland, and is part of the Scottish Episcopal Church. It is arguably the most remote community (by location) within the Anglican Communion. The Rule of the community is a mixture of Franciscan and Cistercian, but with heavy Celtic influences.

== History ==
The community dates its origin from 1984 when the Reverend Mother Mary Agnes arrived on the island of Fetlar to live a contemplative and isolated life of prayer. She took over a simple cottage with a small barn suitable for conversion to a chapel. Others began to visit, or stay, and in 1988 the Society was named and came into existence as a group, rather than an individual. Mother Mary Agnes was formally recognised as Superior by the Church in 1993.

== Community ==
Convent buildings were originally developed on Fetlar. The main convent house was a safe and secure modern building, and a new chapel was built on the convent site, dedicated to "Christ the Encompasser and all his Angels". A version of the community's Rule is followed by a number of 'external oblates', who support the community, and live under simple promises, but not full monastic vows.

In 2015, the community moved to the island of Unst where more medical and social care is available than on Fetlar; one Sister now lives in sheltered care at Uyeasound. A new chapel and community house have been built at Westing on the Atlantic coast of Unst. The community's buildings on Fetlar have been sold.

== Chapels ==
The Byre Chapel was the original place of worship developed from a barn. It was noteworthy for its simple and rustic style of construction and furnishing. The opposite end retained its traditional use, as the SOLI community goat lived there.

The Chapel of Christ the Encompasser and All His Angels was of modern construction and part of the 'new' convent buildings on Fetlar. The daily office was prayed here, and there was a Sunday mass. The chapel afforded impressive sea views.

The new buildings on Unst include the Chapel of Jesus the Good Shepherd.
