= Sisters of Charity (Anglican) =

Anglican religious order

The Sisters of Charity (SC) is an Anglican religious order following the Rule of St. Vincent de Paul, and so committed to the service of those in need. The Order was founded in 1869. From their mission house in Plymouth, England, the sisters are involved in parish and mission work. The community also maintains a nursing home near Plymouth. The order maintains a confraternity of oblates.

Until 2008, the Order maintained a convent and guest house in Martinsburg, West Virginia, where the sisters were active in providing care to children and dogs. In that year, the American SC sisters decided to withdraw from the Order, and to unite with the Community of St. Mary (CSM). The sisters have relocated to the CSM convent at Sewanee, Tennessee.
