= Episcopal Carmel of Saint Teresa =

Religious Community

The Episcopal Carmel of Saint Teresa (OCD) is a contemplative community for women in the Episcopal Church and is the first fully Discalced Carmelite order in the ECUSA or in the Anglican Communion. The monastery and its retreat house are located in Rising Sun, Maryland with the support and guidance of the Right Rev. James Shand, Bishop Visitor.

As well as being a community for women who are called to the contemplative religious life, the Episcopal Carmel also fosters an ever-growing community of mainly female oblates and associates of either sex.

== See also ==
- Carmelite
- Thérèse de Lisieux
- Teresa of Ávila
- John of the Cross
