= Conor J Curran =

- Also known as: CjC
- Born: 1977 (age 47–48); Cork, Ireland
- Origin: Dungarvan, Waterford
- Genres: Glitch; Microsound; Ambient music Drone
- Years active: 1998–present
- Labels: Forwind; Psychonavigation; Silverdoor

Conor J Curran (CjC) is an electronic musician and sound artist based in London. He studied at Trinity College Dublin under the electroacoustic composers Donnacha Dennehy and Roger Doyle and has been involved in many different music projects such as Sonnamble and his solo project CjC.

== Background ==
His work in both music and audio/visual software has been used in modern dance by Dance Theatre of Ireland (Evidence, 2001) and in film by Conor McCourt (Four Cops, 1999). Conor's Parallel, a music visualisation application, was featured at Cybersonica in London in 2002, on Rhizome, Neural and at the Digital Hub in Dublin from January to March 2003.

CjC has released material on Psychonavigation Records, Silverdoor and Forwind. Even though completed in 2003, Form was not released until 2008 on Forwind. It encompasses electronic instrumentals from melodic to abstract. Spatial geometric concepts act as the origins of the timbre and expression. Form was, to a large extent, influenced by the Parallel software he was writing at the time. Track titles, album artwork and the aural visual language all adhere strictly to the spatial concept of Form.

In 2008, Sonnamble was established by Conor and Peter Marsh to explore the possibilities of real-time improvisation between acoustics instruments and extensive digital processing. In March 2010, Sonnamble released its first long player on the Forwind label. The album offers "contemplative meshing of computer software and digital processing with real-time guitar and bass playing". It was described on The Milk Factory website as "a record which unveils its profound beauty with great care, and requires a level of commitment to fully appreciate its depth".

Sonnamble's second album. Blindlight, was released in 2011 on Forwind. "Again the focus is on Marsh's lap steel guitar, whose drones, chords and twangs are coaxed into expansive ambient fuzziness or atomised into grains of noise by Curran's home-cooked software patches. But there's a spareness and a more pronounced spikiness to the music this time round; it's still immersive stuff, but more edgy...". A review by Wyndham Wallace for the BBC said, "Much of Sonnamble's work is improvised, but there's an art to what they do: Curran’s homemade software seems able to reduce every note down to its even smaller constituent parts and then sieve out what suits their goal. The sound is therefore strangely granular, with the opening notes of Aphelion I spreading out and blurring at the edges until they distort and flutter into tiny sounds of their own. It's like moving one's face ever closer to a TV screen, with the picture slowly reduced from an overall pattern to a mass of pixels. What is experienced isn't identifiable in any standard sense, but is nonetheless fascinating."

== Discography ==
=== Sonnamble ===
Albums

- Blindlight (2011) (Forwind - FWD06)
- Seven Months in E minor (2010) (Forwind - FWD01)

=== CjC ===
Albums

- Form(2008) (Forwind - FWD00)

EPs

- CjC Vs Buckminster fuzeboard (2002)

Compilations

- Y9 PSY033 (2009)
- By the new time SIDO 10
- Psychokinesis PSY 003
- Psychonavigation PSY 001
