= Augustinian nuns in the Anglican Communion =

Augustinian congregations

Augustinian nuns are named after Saint Augustine of Hippo (died AD 430) and exist in the Roman Catholic and Anglican churches. In the Roman Catholic Church there are both enclosed monastic orders of women living according to a guide to religious life known as the Rule of Saint Augustine, and also other independent Augustinian congregations living in the spirit of this rule (see Augustinian nuns). In the Anglican Communion, there is no single "Order of St Augustine", but a number of Augustinian congregations of sisters living according to the Rule of St Augustine.

== Rule ==
Although Augustine of Hippo probably did not compose a formal monastic rule (despite the extant Augustinian Rule), his hortatory letter to the nuns at Hippo Regius (Epist., ccxi, Benedictine ed.) is the most ancient example on which the beginnings of this Augustinian Rule are based. The nuns regard as their first foundation the monastery for which St Augustine wrote the rules of life in his Epistola ccxi (alias cix) in 423. It is certain that at an early date this epistle was called the Rule of St Augustine for nuns and that it has been followed as the rule of life in many female monasteries. There has been a long tradition of independence within the Augustinian movement and this has led to differences in rule, dress, and mode of life between different Augustinian congregations.

== Some Anglican Augustinian congregations ==
The following congregations, societies, or communities of sisters follow the Rule of St Augustine within the Anglican tradition:

- Community of All Hallows (CAH) formerly at Ditchingham in England, now dispersed
- Community of the Good Shepherd (CGS) at Sabah in Malaysia
- Community of the Holy Spirit (CHS) at New York City in the United States
- Community of St John Baptist (CSJB) at Cuddesdon in England and Mendham in the United States
- Community of St Mary the Virgin (CSMV) at Wantage in England
- Community of the Servants of the Cross (CSC) at Chichester in England
- Sisterhood of the Holy Nativity (SHN) at Ripon, Wisconsin, in the United States
- Society of the Holy Cross (Korea) (SHC) at Seoul in Korea (Augustinian Rule modified with elements of the Benedictine Rule)
- Society of the Precious Blood (SPB) formerly at Burnham Abbey near Maidenhead in England, and now living with the Community of Servants of the Cross at Gerrards Cross (and also Maseru in Lesotho)
- Society of the Sisters of Bethany (SSB) at Southsea in England (a modified version of the Augustinian Rule)

== See also ==
- Anglican religious order
