= Pierre Coste =

French theologian, translator and writer (1668–1747)

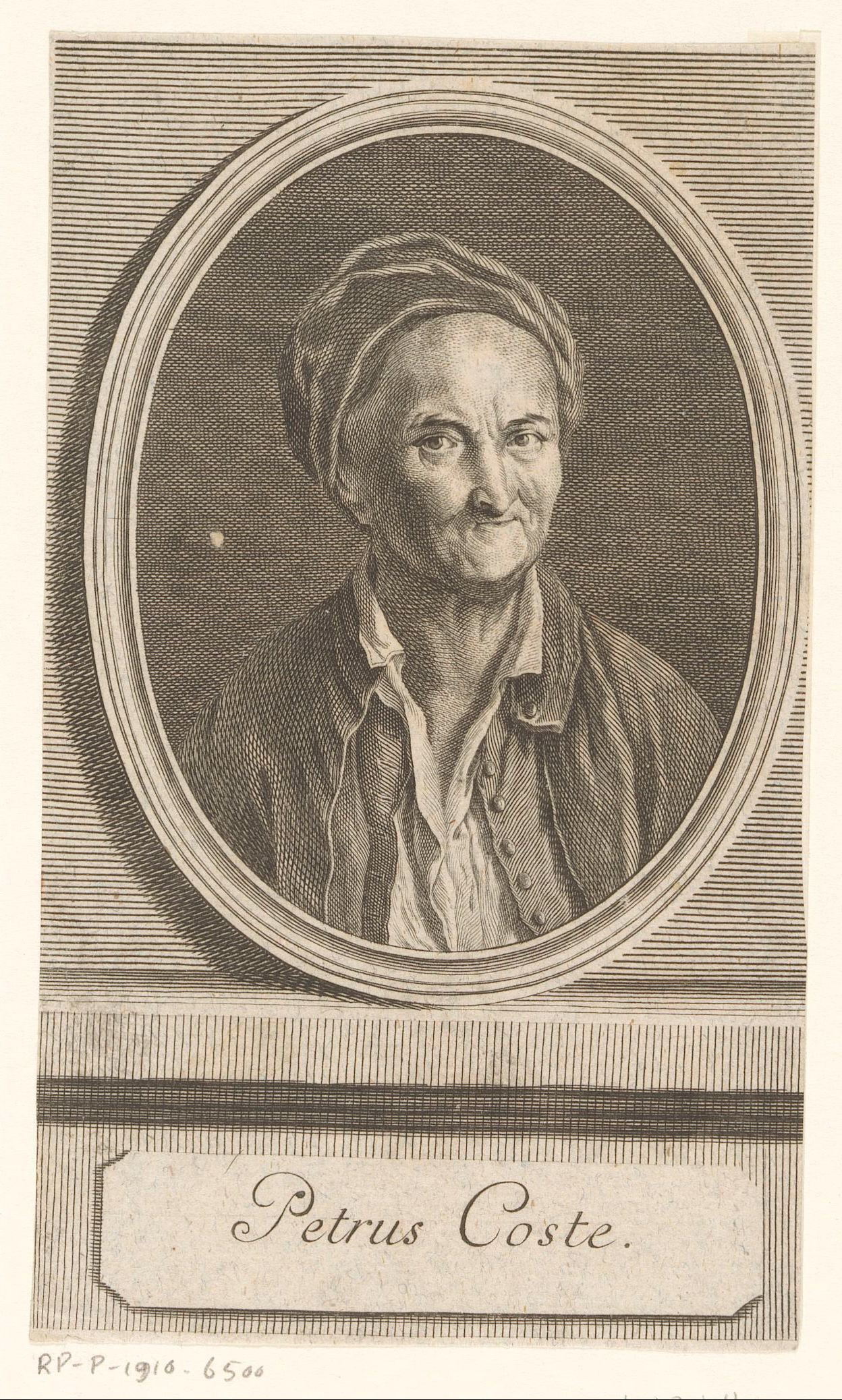
- Born: Pierre Coste; 27 October 1668; Uzès
- Died: 24 January 1747 (aged 78); Paris
- Occupations: theologian, translator and writer.
- Awards: FRS

Pierre Coste (Latin: Petrus Coste; 27 October 1668 – 24 January 1747) was a French theologian, translator and writer.

Born in Uzès, France to Protestant parents, he moved to England, via Switzerland and Holland, after the Revocation of the Edict of Nantes in 1685. There he translated John Locke's An Essay Concerning Human Understanding, and the second English edition of Newton's Opticks, and acted as tutor to the sons of several families. He moved back to Paris c.1735 to be married, but returned to England after the death of his wife.

He was elected a Fellow of the Royal Society in 1742.

He died in Paris in 1747.
