= Community of Jesus' Compassion =

The Community of Jesus' Compassion (CJC) is an Anglican religious order founded in 1993 by Sister Londiwe Manqele and located near Pietermaritzburg, South Africa in the Diocese of Natal of the Anglican Church of Southern Africa. The primary work of the sisters in concerned with evangelism and children's ministry.
