= Company of Mission Priests =

The Company of Mission Priests (CMP) is a "dispersed community" of male priests of the Anglican Communion who desire to consecrate themselves wholly to the church's mission, free from the attachments of marriage and family. CMP was founded in 1940 by the initiative of the superiors of the Anglican religious orders of the Community of the Resurrection, the Society of the Sacred Mission and the Society of St John the Evangelist.

== Characteristics ==
CMP follows a Vincentian rule of life. It is not classified as an Anglican religious order by the church, but as an "acknowledged community". Members give simple promises (cf. simple vow) which are renewed annually. The whole community meets in general chapter once a year and the regional chapters more frequently.

CMP is known for its work in Guyana and Madagascar and for its work in staffing "needy" parishes in England with two or more priests living in a clergy house. CMP was one of the founding members of the Vincentian Millennium partnership in 2000.

== Wardens ==
- Roy Fellows (1981–1987)
- Timothy Pike (2005–2012)
- Beresford Skelton (2012–present)

== Episcopal visitor ==
The episcopal visitor is Martin Warner, Bishop of Chichester.
