= Order of Christ the Saviour =

Anglican Dominican religious order

- Abbreviation: OCS
- Headquarters: Springfield, Illinois
- Spirituality: Dominican, Anglo-Catholic
- Prelate of the Order: The Very Rev. Br. Andrew S. Hook, OCS
- Patron Saints: Michael (archangel); Mary Magdalene; Catherine of Siena
- Episcopal Visitor: The Rt. Rev. Daniel G. P. Gutierrez
- Website: anglicanocs.org

The Order of Christ the Saviour (OCS) is an Anglo-Catholic dispersed Dominican community within the Episcopal Church and Anglican Communion. The Order is characterized by its study of Thomistic scholarship and its ministerial focus on deliverance ministry within the Anglican tradition. The Order adopts the Rule of St. Augustine, guiding its members towards a life of prayer, community service, and frequent engagement with the sacraments. Membership in the Order is open to confirmed communicants in good standing in communion with the See of Canterbury.

The Order is recognized as an Associate community of the National Association of Episcopal Christian Communities and operates as a registered nonprofit organization in the State of Illinois. The Order's ecclesiastical authority is derived from its Bishop Protector, currently The Rt. Rev. Daniel G.P. Gutiérrez, the XVI Bishop of Pennsylvania, with its initial authorization granted by The Rt. Rev. Brian K. Burgess, XII Bishop of Springfield, in accordance with The Episcopal Church's canonical provisions.

Members of the OCS, who may be Dominican Friars or Sisters, are required to undergo a comprehensive formation process that includes an initial postulancy, a novitiate period, and subsequent professions—simple and solemn. This process ensures a deep integration of the Order's charisms and the Dominican Rule into the members' spiritual lives. The community welcomes individuals from diverse backgrounds without discrimination based on gender, race, or sexual orientation, and members are expected to uphold vows of chastity, poverty, and obedience.

The primary ministry of the OCS revolves around education and support for Anglican Exorcists and diocesan-authorized Deliverance Ministers, alongside broader educational initiatives in areas such as Thomistic Angelology, Mariology and Anglo-Catholicism. The Order is committed to prayer, pastoral care, and regular participation in the sacraments. The OCS is committed to the responsible practice of deliverance ministry, consciously working to reconcile the historical misuses of such practices against marginalized groups.

On the Feast of Saint Catherine of Siena, the OCS published the first independent Anglican Rite of Exorcism for use in selected dioceses in the Episcopal Church. The Rite can only be purchased by Anglican bishops, who may then distribute the Rite to clergy and religious in their diocese.
