= Benedictine Sisters of Bethany =

Sister Jane EBSB holding a crucifix donated to the convent chapel.

The Benedictine Sisters of Bethany (EBSB) is a religious order for women within the Anglican Church in Cameroon, West Africa. Its mother house (main convent) is in Bamenda. Its principal work is the care of orphaned street children.

== History ==
The community's history begins with the Emmanuel Sisterhood, an order of nuns in the Presbyterian Church of Cameroon. One of the sisters of this order, Sister Jane Mankaa (1960 - 2021), who joined the community aged 16, felt a strong calling years later to convert to the Anglican Communion and start new work with homeless street children. She did so, but with the permission of the Bishop of Cameroon, she remained living under vows and adopted the Benedictine Rule. After studying convent management in the United States for one year and living with the Episcopal Community of St John Baptist in Mendham, New Jersey, Sister Jane returned to Cameroon. Women gathered around her to learn from her and the Benedictine Sisters of Bethany were born. The order became Cameroon's first Anglican religious community. The community is called the "Benedictine Sisters of Bethany" (BSB), but sisters use the post-nominal initials EBSB, in which the "E" is a reference to "Emmanuel", the sisterhood in which Sr Jane first took vows.

In Bamenda, a convent and dormitory with chapel and refectory have been constructed. Redeemer Nursery School is in operation on the compound. The Roberto Rovere Health Clinic is under construction on site to meet the needs of the children and area villagers. Plans are currently underway to construct Good Shepherd Academy, Anglican, a co-ed secondary/high school for 600 residential students in Bafut, Cameroon. There are future plans to construct a residential home and hospice for children with AIDS.

== The Good Shepherd Home, Bamenda ==
Sister Jane felt a strong call to care for the many homeless children of Cameroon, some of whom were orphans (often due to their parents having died of AIDS), whilst others were simply more than their parents (with over-large families) could care for. The Good Shepherd Home in Bamenda, Cameroon now cares for 100 children who would otherwise be homeless. They are given a loving family life, food, shelter, and protection from the sometimes violent life of the city. Today, the Home has four self-sustaining projects - a chicken farm, pig farm, bakery and three vegetable farms. In addition, Good Shepherd Home relies on donations of food from local people and donations of money from overseas supporters.

== Security ==
Following a series of robberies and attacks that culminated in a raid by armed robbers who threatened to kill the sisters, a security system has been installed to alert the local neighbourhood if the convent is attacked.

== Batibo ==
In 2010 the community opened a second convent and orphanage at Batibo, Cameroon, for special needs orphans, expanding the outreach and care provided. The Sisters of Bethany now care for approximately 150 orphaned children across the two sites, as well as many others who are fed or supported with medical care. A second bakery and a store are the two self-sustaining projects of the Batibo home.

== See also ==
- Anglican Diocese of Cameroon
- Order of St Benedict (Anglican)
- Religion in Cameroon

== Media ==
- Geitz, Elizabeth I Am That Child: Changing Hearts and Changing the World Morehouse Publishing, 2012. ISBN 978-0819227782
- Licostie, Nadine, Director The Good Mother of Abangoh. Red Thread Productions, 2008.
