= Mucknell Abbey =

Monastery in Worcestershire, England

Coordinates: 52.1596°N 2.1388°W

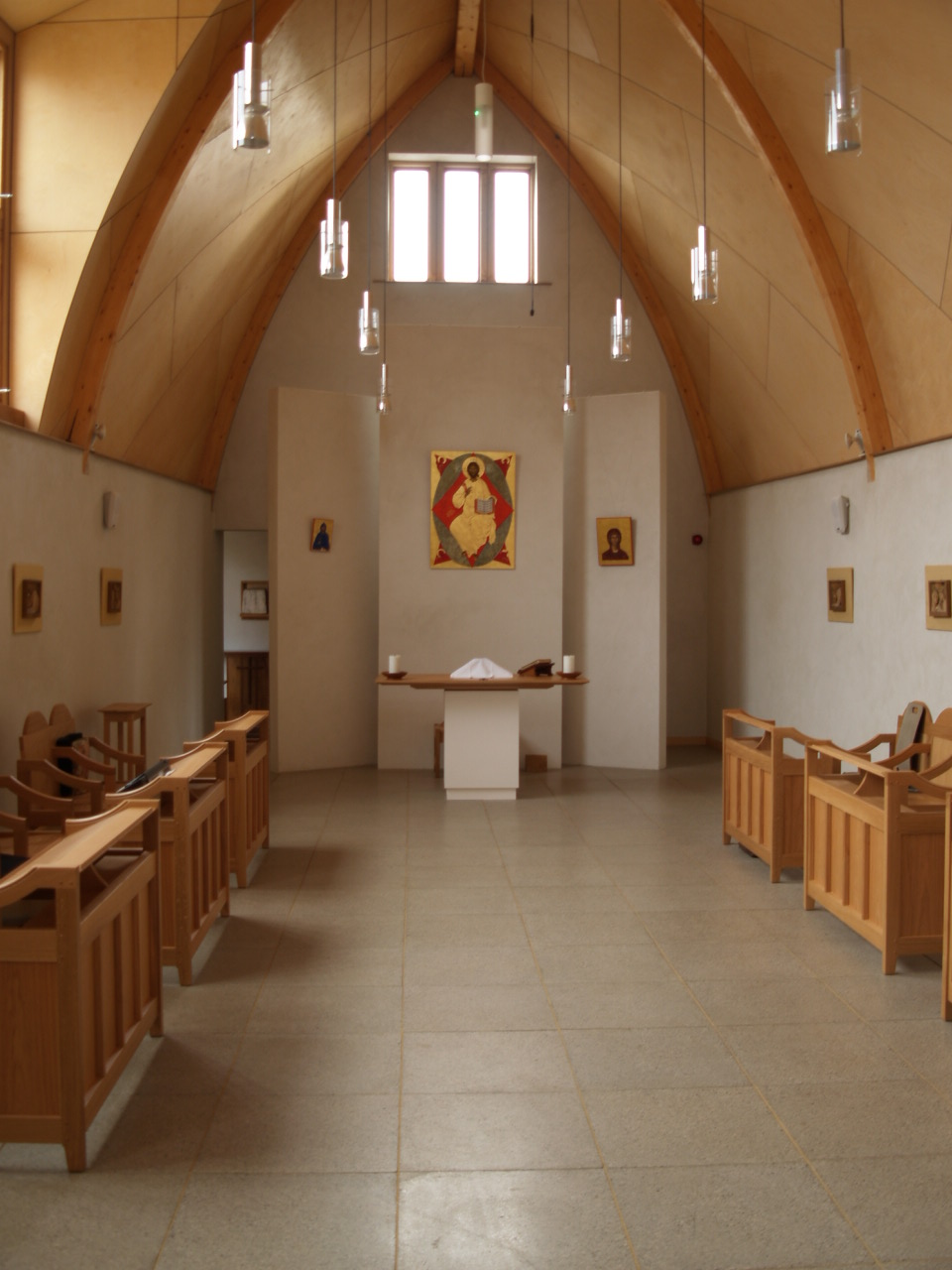
Mucknell Abbey Oratory

Mucknell Abbey is an Anglican Benedictine monastery in Worcestershire, England. The community, which formerly lived at Burford, has both male and female members. Its formal legal name is The Society of the Salutation of Mary the Virgin.

== History ==
The present abbey was previously a farm in the parish of Stoulton and was purchased by the community after they had sold their former house at Burford Priory, Oxfordshire, a Grade I listed building, which was highly impractical both to maintain and also for the elderly members of the community. Between the sale of the house at Burford in 2008 and the completion of Mucknell Abbey in late 2010, the community lived in rented accommodation near Evesham.

== Buildings ==
The new monastery is on the site of a derelict farm (Mucknell Farm). When the community purchased the site, the buildings were shells. The former farmhouse was unable to be redeveloped and was demolished to make way for a new community block on the south side of the courtyard. Within the community building are the cells, the community room (recreation space), the laundry, and several workrooms. The remaining three sides of the courtyard have been converted into a Guest Wing (North-west corner), a Refectory (West side), and a Library, Chapter Room and general office (East side and North-east corner).

A new Oratory was built in the centre of the courtyard and is accessible both from the courtyard and from the Monastic Enclosure. The foundation stone of the Oratory was laid by the Bishop of Worcester, John Inge, on 13 May 2010 and the Oratory was dedicated by the Archbishop of Canterbury, Rowan Williams, on 25 March 2011.

== Sustainability ==
A large part of the ethos of the community is ecological sustainability. To this end, the new abbey was built with numerous features to enable and assist sustainable living. The buildings feature high grade insulation to minimise heat loss; the heating is powered by a biomass fuelled boiler. Electrical power is provided in part by photovoltaic panels, and solar water heating panels reduce the use of the boiler during the summer months. In addition to harnessing solar energy, the new buildings also harvest rain water, which is stored in a 5,000-litre (1,100 imp gal; 1,300 US gal) tank and is used to flush the lavatories and water the kitchen garden; there is a further 45,000 litres (9,900 imp gal; 12,000 US gal) available for fire-fighting. The wastewater from the site is treated in a bio-digester and consequently the buildings are not connected to the sewage network. Much of the community's vegetables are grown onsite in the kitchen garden, and it is hoped that once the orchard has developed, it will further reduce the need to buy in fruits and vegetables. By summer 2024, the abbey was successfully producing several items including raspberries, cherries, strawberries, potatoes, courgettes, tomatoes and beans. Both the kitchen garden and orchard are managed using eco-friendly means.

== The community ==
The community is made up of professed monks and nuns, novices, and 'alongsiders'. Alongsiders live with the community for a variety of reasons, ranging from exploring a possible monastic vocation, to a simple desire to experience the monastic life for a while. Alongsiders stay with the community for between one and twelve months and while living alongside are expected to follow the community's timetable and participate in its work.

== Timetable ==
In common with other religious orders, the primary work of the community at Mucknell Abbey is the work of God, that is to say, prayer. During the day the community come together six times to sing the Offices and also for Holy Communion. Work periods are between Terce and Holy Communion in the morning and between None and Vespers in the afternoon. After Compline the community observe Greater Silence through the night until the end of Terce the following morning. There is also solitude time allocated during the day; in the morning between the offices, and in the afternoon between Vespers and supper. On Thursdays, the community normally meet for corporate Lectio Divina which is followed by corporate tea. Corporate tea affords the community an opportunity to engage in conversation which otherwise is scarce in the monastic life.
