= Episcopal Church in Jerusalem and the Middle East =

Anglican church organization

Episcopal Church of Jerusalem and the Middle East
- مطرانية القدس الأسقفية
- Type: Anglican Province
- Classification: Christian
- Orientation: Anglican
- Scripture: Holy Bible
- Theology: Anglican
- Polity: Episcopal
- Governance: Unitary
- Presiding Bishop: Hosam Naoum
- Language: Arabic(Mainly), Hebrew, English, Greek, Persian
- Liturgy: Anglican Worship/Liturgy
- Headquarters: Jerusalem
- Territory: Israel, Palestinian territories, Jordan, Syria, Lebanon, Cyprus, the Persian Gulf states, Oman, Yemen, Iraq, Egypt, Ethiopia, Iran
- Members: 35,000

Diocese of Jerusalem Diocese of Cyprus and the Gulf Diocese of Iran

The Episcopal Church of Jerusalem and the Middle East is a province of the Anglican Communion. The primate of the church is called President Bishop and represents the Church at the international Anglican Communion Primates' Meetings. The Central Synod of the church is its deliberative and legislative organ.

The province consists of three dioceses:

- Diocese of Jerusalem — covering Israel, Palestinian territories, Jordan, Syria and Lebanon,
- Diocese of Cyprus and the Gulf — covering Cyprus, the Arabian Peninsula and Iraq,
- Diocese of Iran.

A fourth diocese (Egypt with North Africa and the Horn of Africa) was part of the province until June 2020. In 2019 the synod of the province agreed to allow the Diocese of Egypt to withdraw, in order to become an autonomous province, with the other three existing dioceses remaining as the Province of Jerusalem and the Middle East. This was put into effect on 29 June 2020, with the creation of the Province of Alexandria.

Each diocese is headed by a bishop. The President Bishop (Primate, but not an Archbishop) is chosen from among the diocesan bishops, and retains diocesan responsibility. The President Bishop, Hosam Naoum since 2023, also serves as Archbishop in Jerusalem. The province estimates that it has around 35,000 baptized members in 55 congregations. The province has around 40 educational or medical establishments and 90 clergy.

== History ==
=== Nineteenth century ===
The Episcopal Church in Jerusalem and the Middle East began as a number of missionary posts of the Church Mission Society (CMS) in Cyprus, the Middle East and the Persia. The Church Mission Society continues to provide the province with lay mission partners and ordained chaplains, but now the majority of its ministry is drawn from local congregations.

During the 1820s, CMS began to prepare for permanent missionary stations in the region.

In 1833, a missionary station was established in Jerusalem with the support of the London Society for Promoting Christianity Amongst the Jews (a Jewish Christian missionary society now known as the Church's Ministry Among Jewish People or CMJ). In 1839, the building of the Church of Saint Mark, Alexandria was begun.

In 1841, Michael Solomon Alexander, a converted rabbi, arrived in Jerusalem as bishop. His diocese originally covered the mission stations in the Middle East and Egypt, and was a joint venture with the Evangelical Church in Prussia known as Anglo-Prussian bishopric in Jerusalem (also called Anglo-Prussian Union), serving Lutherans and Anglicans.

In 1849, Christ Church, Jerusalem, became the first Anglican church in Jerusalem.

In the 1860s The Church of the Good Shepherd, Salt in modern Jordan had its origins in the work of a local Arab grain merchant and colporteur from Nablus who started bible studies under a tree. At the time Salt, Jordan was a major Ottoman regional city east of the river Jordan in the Levant.

In 1871, Christ Church, Nazareth was consecrated by Bishop Samuel Gobat, and the first Arab Anglicans were ordained.

In 1881, the Anglo-Prussian Union ceased to function, and it was formally dissolved in 1887. From that time, the diocese became solely Anglican, while the Lutheran mission eventually evolved into Evangelical Lutheran Church in Jordan.

In 1888, Bishop George Blyth founded the Jerusalem and the East Mission, which would help raise funds for missions throughout the Middle East.

Saint George's Cathedral was built in 1898 in Jerusalem as a central focus for the diocese.

=== Twentieth century ===
Although the Diocese of Jerusalem and the Middle East began as a foreign missionary organisation, it quickly established itself as part of the local, especially Palestinian community. In 1905, the Palestinian Native Church Council was established to give Palestinians more say in the running of the church. This led to an increase in the number of Palestinian and Arab clergy serving the diocese.

In 1920, the Diocese of Egypt and the Sudan was formed, separate from the Diocese of Jerusalem, with Llewelyn Gwynne as its first bishop. In the 1920s the Bishop founded St. George's College as a seminary for local clergy-in-training. Bishop Gwynne established the second cathedral of All Saints', Cairo (the present cathedral is the third building) in 1938.

In 1945, Sudan became a separate diocese from Egypt (see Episcopal Church of the Sudan for its history).

In 1957, the See of Jerusalem was elevated to the rank of an archbishopric (its bishop being an archbishop) under the authority of the Archbishop of Canterbury. The Archbishop in Jerusalem had metropolitan oversight of the entire area of the current province with the addition of the Sudan (five dioceses in all). In that same year, Najib Cubain was consecrated Bishop of Jordan, Lebanon and Syria, the first Arab bishop, assistant to the Archbishop in Jerusalem. During the 1950s, political unrest in Egypt left the diocese in the care of four Egyptian clergy under the oversight of the Archbishop in Jerusalem. On 29 August 1974, Faik Haddad (to become coadjutor bishop in Jerusalem) and Aql Aql (to become Assistant Bishop in the Diocese of Jordan, Lebanon and Syria) were consecrated bishops by Stopford at St George's Cathedral, Jerusalem.

An Anglican Bishop of Egypt was appointed in 1968, and, in 1974, the first Egyptian bishop, Ishaq Musaad, was consecrated. In 1976, Faik Haddad became the first Palestinian Anglican bishop in Jerusalem.

In 1970, the church became a recognized religious authority in Israel for the purposes of personal status law, including the solemnization of marriage. In 1976, the structure of the Anglican church in the region was overhauled. Jerusalem became an ordinary bishopric and the four dioceses had equal status in the Province of Jerusalem and the Middle East. The Archbishop of Canterbury relinquished his metropolitan authority to a Presiding Bishop and the Central Synod, with the four dioceses rotating the responsibility of the Bishop President and synodical leadership. The central synod includes the four dioceses of the Province of Jerusalem and the Middle East. In Jerusalem when a bishop reaches the age of 68 a coadjutor bishop should be elected to work alongside the bishop for two years. while the Bishops in Egypt and Iran are elected without working alongside the former bishop; and the Bishop of Cyprus and the Gulf was appointed by the Archbishop of Canterbury. Due to the difficult situation in Iran since the 1970's various Bishops or Vicars General have been appointed to serve in the position, often residing outside the country.

The Diocese of Egypt was expanded to take in the chaplaincies of Ethiopia, Somalia, Libya, Tunisia and Algeria. Sudan became a fully separate and independent province; it was further divided into Sudan and South Sudan.

In 1970, the Cathedral of All Saints in Cairo was demolished to make way for a new Nile bridge. In 1977, work on a new building on Zamalek was begun, and completed in 1988.

In June 2020 the Diocese of Egypt left the province, split into four dioceses, and was formed into an autonomous province named the Episcopal/Anglican Province of Alexandria.

== President Bishops ==
The President Bishops of the Central Synod have been:

- 1977–1985: Hassan Dehqani-Tafti, Bishop in Iran
- 1985–1995: Samir Kafity, Bishop of Jerusalem
- 1995–2000: Ghais Malik, Bishop of Egypt
- 2000–2002: Iraj Mottahedeh, Bishop in Iran
- 2002–2007: Clive Handford, Bishop in Cyprus and the Gulf
- 2007–2017: Mouneer Anis, Bishop of Egypt
- 2017–2019: Suheil Dawani, Archbishop in Jerusalem
- 2019–2023: Michael Lewis, Bishop in Cyprus and the Gulf
- 2023–present: Hosam Naoum, Archbishop in Jerusalem

== Dioceses ==
=== Diocese of Cyprus and the Gulf ===
Diocesan seats are St Paul's Cathedral, Nicosia, Cyprus and St Christopher's Cathedral, Manama, Bahrain. The current bishop is Sean Semple.

The diocese is divided into two archdeaconries: one for Cyprus and one for the Persian Gulf area.

Countries served:

- Bahrain
- Cyprus
- Iraq
- Kuwait
- Oman
- Qatar
- Saudi Arabia
- United Arab Emirates
- Yemen

=== Diocese of Iran ===
The Diocese of Iran was first established in 1912 as the Diocese of Persia and was incorporated into the Jerusalem Archbishopric in 1957. Currently, there is an episcopal vacancy and the Vicar General is the Revd Albert Walters. The diocesan seat is St Luke's Church, Isfahan, Iran.

=== Diocese of Jerusalem ===
The current Anglican Archbishop in Jerusalem is Hosam Naoum who was installed on May 13, 2021.

Effective from 2014, the Jerusalem diocese has again become an archbishopric, with its bishop styled "Archbishop in Jerusalem". This title applies regardless of whether the current bishop is the primate of the province or not, and is a mark of the ambassadorial role of the archbishop in the Holy Land on behalf of the Anglican Communion.

The Diocese of Jerusalem covers Israel, the Palestinian territories, Jordan, Syria and Lebanon.

The diocesan seat is Cathedral Church of St George the Martyr, Jerusalem.

The parish with the largest congregation is the Church of the Redeemer, Amman, Jordan. The cornerstone of the church was laid in 1949, and the church houses both Arabic and English-speaking congregations today.

== Anglican realignment ==
Then-President Bishop Mouneer Anis was the Chairman of the Global South and one of the seven Anglican archbishops present at the investiture of Foley Beach as the second Archbishop of the Anglican Church in North America at 9 October 2014. The seven Primates signed a statement recognizing Beach as a "fellow Primate of the Anglican Communion". The province was represented at GAFCON III, in Jerusalem, on 17–22 June 2018, by a 13 members delegation, from Egypt, Ethiopia, Israel, Jordan and the United Arab Emirates. However, the province itself is not a member of GAFCON.

In 2022, Michael Lewis, then Archbishop of the Diocese of Cyprus and the Gulf and President Bishop, signed a letter during the Lambeth Conference supporting the full inclusion of LGBTQ people in the Anglican Communion.
