= Stephen Need =

20th and 21st-century British Anglican priest and author

The Reverend Stephen Need
- Dean of St George's College, Jerusalem
- Church: Church of England
- Province: Episcopal Church in Jerusalem and the Middle East
- Diocese: Diocese of Jerusalem
- In office: 2 July 2005 (elected) – 30 April 2011 (resigned)

Personal details
- Born: 4 March 1954 (age 72), Nottingham, United Kingdom
- Denomination: Anglican
- Education: King's College, London

Stephen William Need (born 1954) is an Anglican priest and religious author, who was the dean of St George's College, Jerusalem from 2005 until 2011.

== Early life and education ==
Need was born in Nottingham, England. He was educated at Carlton le Willows Grammar School in Nottinghamshire. He went on to study theology at King's College, London, graduating with a Bachelor of Divinity (BD) degree and the Associateship of King's College (AKC) in 1979. He undertook further studies at King's College, graduating with a Master of Theology (MTh) in 1983. He also studied for a doctorate in systematic theology, which he completed in 1993.

== Career ==
Need first joined the staff of St George's College, Jerusalem as senior lecturer in 1996 and as a course director from 1999 to 2001. In March 2008, Need was ordained a priest at the college, where he served as a member of the pastoral sector at the time. He served his curacy at St. George's Cathedral, Jerusalem, from 2008 to 2011.

In 2011, he returned to the United Kingdom, to become a priest of the Diocese of Chelmsford. From 2011 to 2021, was priest in charge then rector of All Saints' Church, Stock and of St Mary & St Edward, West Hanningfield. When leaving Jerusalem, he stated he also wanted to pursue further academic studies, having a particular interest in the areas of St. Paul and Christianity in Turkey. Since 2021, he has been team rector of St Peter and St Michael, Bexhill on Sea, in the Diocese of Chichester, with responsibility for St. Peter.s Church, Bexhill.

Need is also the author of several successful books.

== Select bibliography ==
- Truly Divine and Truly Human: The Story of Christ and the Seven Ecumenical Councils (2008)
- 52 Reflections on Faith for Busy Preachers and Teachers: From the Sinai Summits to the Emmaus Road (2014)
