= Bishop of Jerusalem =

Bishop of Jerusalem may refer to:

- Early bishops of Jerusalem (until 451)
- Greek Orthodox Patriarch of Jerusalem
- Syriac Orthodox Archbishop of Jerusalem
- Latin Patriarch of Jerusalem
- Armenian Patriarch of Jerusalem
- Coptic Orthodox Archbishop of Jerusalem
- Church of the East bishop of Jerusalem
- Anglican Archbishop in Jerusalem
- Evangelical Lutheran Bishop in Jordan and the Holy Land
- Anglo-Prussian bishop in Jerusalem
