= Joseph Barclay =

Joseph Barclay (1831–1881) was Anglican Bishop in Jerusalem.

== Early life ==
Barclay was born near Strabane in County Tyrone, Ireland, his family being of Scottish extraction. He was educated at Trinity College Dublin, and proceeded B.A. in 1854 and M.A. in 1857, but showed no particular powers of application or study. In 1854 he was ordained to a curacy at Bagnelstown, County Carlow, and on taking up his residence there began to show very great interest in the work of the London Society for promoting Christianity among the Jews. The question of Jewish conversion was at that time agitating the religious world in England, and Barclay supported the cause in his own neighbourhood with great activity, till in 1858 he offered himself to the London Society as a missionary. He left Ireland, and after a few months' study in London, was appointed to Constantinople. The mission there had been established in 1835, but no impression had been made on the 60,000 Jews calculated to inhabit the town. Barclay stayed in Constantinople till 1861, making missionary journeys to the Danubian provinces, Rhodes, and other nearer districts.

He married Lucy Agnes Tryphosa Andrew (d. 1882), 3rd daughter of Rev. William Wayte Andrew (1804–1889), of Wood Hall, Hethersett, Norfolk, 52 years Vicar of Ketteringham in Norfolk, as is recorded on the latter's mural monument in Ketteringham Church.

== Career in the Anglican Church ==
In 1861 he was nominated incumbent of Christ Church, Jerusalem, a position requiring energy and tact to avoid entanglement in the quarrels of the parties whose rivalries Barclay describes as a ‘fretting leprosy’ neutralising his best efforts. In 1865 he visited England and Ireland on private matters, received the degree of LL.D. from his university, and married. On his return he found it impossible to continue in his post unless his salary was increased, and the refusal of the London Society to do this necessitated his resignation. This was in 1870; he returned again to England and filled for a time the curacies of Howe, Lincolnshire and St. Margaret's, Westminster, till in 1873 he was presented to the living of Stapleford in the St. Albans diocese. The comparative leisure thus afforded him enabled him to publish in 1877 translations of certain select treatises of the Talmud with his own prolegomena and notes. Opinion has been much divided as to the value of this work, but Jewish critics are unanimous in asserting that it is marked by an unfair animus against their nation and literature.

== Later life ==
In 1880 he received the degree of D.D. from Trinity College Dublin. In 1879 the see of Jerusalem became vacant, and Barclay's experience and attainments marked him out as the only man likely to fill the post successfully. He was consecrated a bishop, by Archibald Campbell Tait, Archbishop of Canterbury, on 25 July at St Paul's Cathedral. He was most enthusiastically welcomed to Jerusalem, and entered on his duties with his usual vigour, but his sudden death after a short illness in October 1881 put an end to the hopes of those who believed that at last some of the objects of the original founders of the Anglo-Prussian Bishopric in Jerusalem were to be realised.

Bishop Barclay's attainments were most extensive. He preached in Spanish, French, and German; he was intimately acquainted with Biblical, Mishnaic Hebrew and Judaeo-Spanish, the dialect spoken by the Sephardic Jews. He diligently prosecuted his studies in Hebrew and at his death was perfecting his knowledge of Arabic; and he had acquired some knowledge of Turkish during his residence in Constantinople.

== Arms ==
Coat of arms of Joseph Barclay

Notes
Granted 15 July 1878 by Sir John Bernard Burke, Ulster King of Arms.
Crest
A mitre Or charged with an escallop Gules.
Escutcheon
Gules a chevron Ermine between ten crosses patee six in chief and four in base Argent and escallop of the field.
Motto
Dieu Avec Nous

Anglican Communion titles
| Preceded by Samuel Gobat | Bishop of Jerusalem; 1879–1881 | Vacant Title next held by George Blyth |
