= Riah Abu El-Assal =

Israeli Palestinian Anglican bishop (born 1937)

Riah Hanna Abu El-Assal
- Anglican Bishop Emeritus of Jerusalem
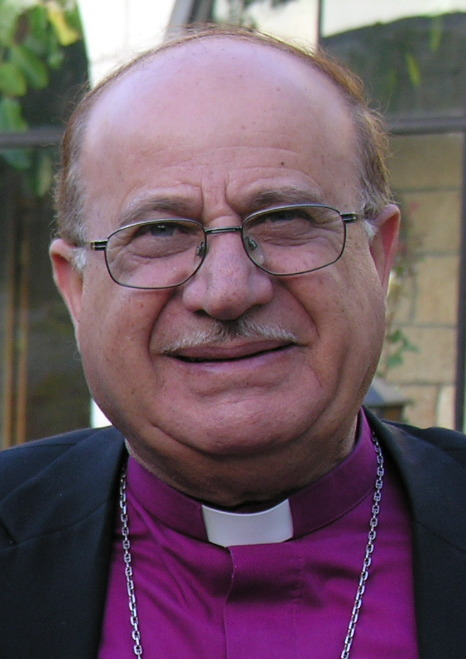
- Riah Abu El-Assal in 2005.
- Native name: رياح حنا أبو العسل
- Church: Episcopal Church in Jerusalem and the Middle East
- Diocese: Anglican Diocese of Jerusalem
- See: Jerusalem
- Elected: 1997
- Term ended: 31 March 2007
- Predecessor: Samir Kafity
- Successor: Suheil Salman Ibrahim Dawani

Personal details
- Born: November 6, 1937 (age 89) Nazareth, British Mandate of Palestine
- Residence: Jerusalem
- Education: Nazareth Baptist School

Riah Hanna Abu El-Assal (Arabic: رياح حنا أبو العسل, Riyāḥ Ḥannā abū 'l-ʿAsal, Hebrew: ריאח אבו אלעסל; born 6 November 1937 in Nazareth) is an Israeli Palestinian Anglican bishop, who was the Bishop in Jerusalem from 1997 to 2007.

== History ==
Abu El-Assal graduated from Nazareth Baptist school where he also taught. While at Nazareth he was a member of the PLP, the Progressive List for Peace – a joint Jewish-Arab political party which, while existing only for eight years (1984–1992) is considered to have broken many previously sacrosanct taboos and profoundly influenced subsequent Israeli politics. During his time in Nazareth he was vicar of Christ Church, Nazareth.

In 1997, Abu El-Assal became the thirteenth Anglican Bishop of Jerusalem and head of the Episcopal Church in Jerusalem and the Middle East until his retirement on 31 March 2007 at the prescribed retirement age of 70 years, though he was only seven and a half months short of his 70th birthday.

Since retirement, Abu El-Assal has been engaged in a legal dispute with his successor and the Episcopal Diocese of Jerusalem over the ownership of the Bishop Riah Educational Campus, a school established by him when he was bishop.

== Ministry ==
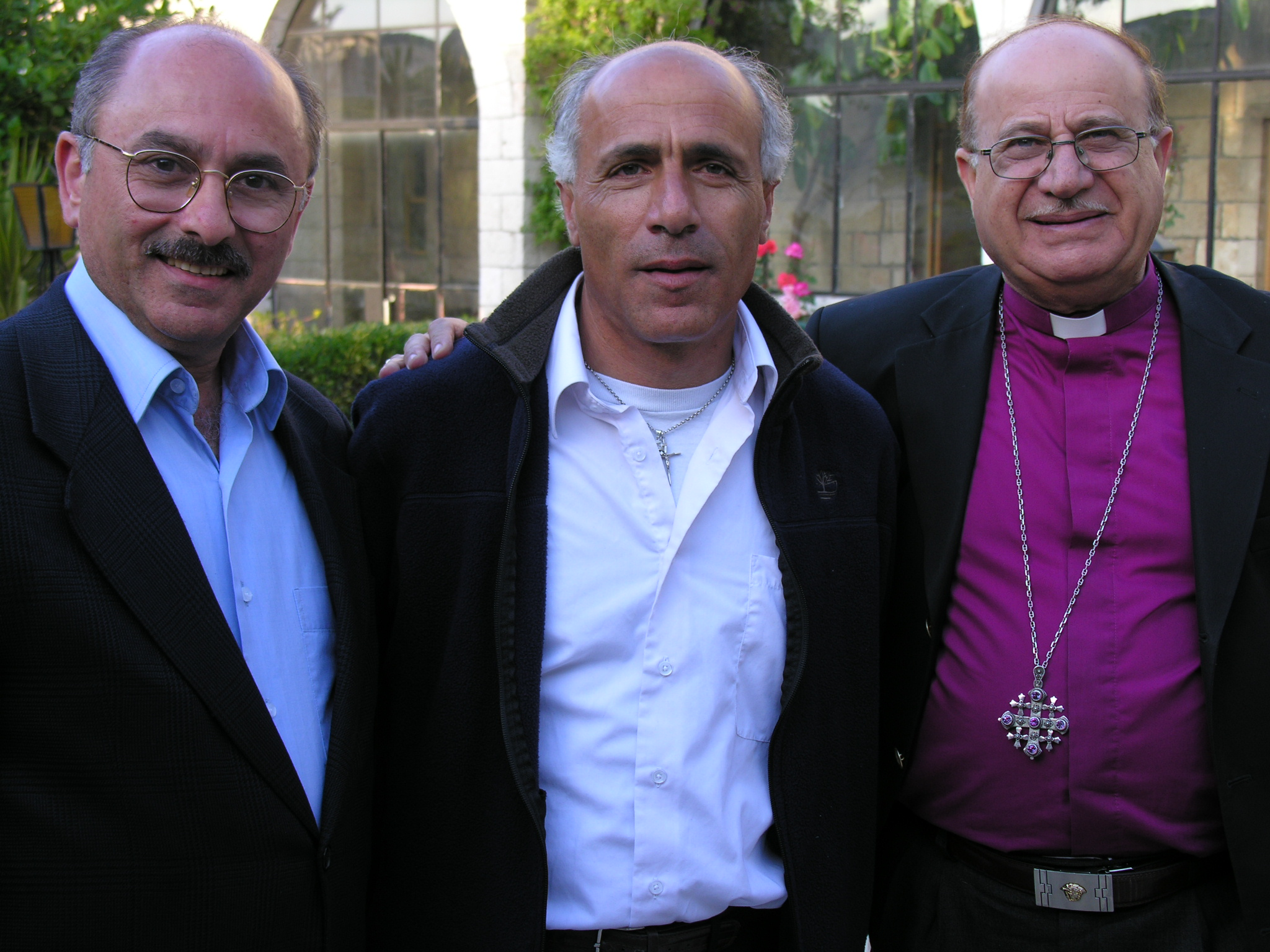
Bishop Riah Abu Assal meeting with Ali Kazak and Mordechai Vanunu in Jerusalem, 2005

Abu El-Assal has traveled widely, raising support and finances for the Bishop Riah Educational Campus and other community programmes with a vision of peace in The Holy Land.

Abu El-Assal traveled to Australia in 2006 where he attended the Black Stump Music and Arts Festival.

== Family ==
Riah Abu El-Assal is married to a niece of Emile Habibi. His grandfather started the first modern pilgrim service in 1893 and opened branches in Jaffa, Jerusalem, Nazareth and Tiberias. His son Hanna is currently principal of the Bishop Riah Educational Campus in Nazareth.

== See also ==
- Faik Haddad
- Palestinian Christian
- St. George's Cathedral, Jerusalem
