= St. George's College, Jerusalem =

College in Jerusalem

Coordinates: 31°47′14.24″N 35°13′45.68″E

St. George's College Jerusalem
- Type: Private
- Established: 1920
- Affiliations: Anglican
- Dean: Canon Richard Sewell
- Location: East Jerusalem
- Campus: Urban
- Website: saintgeorgescollegejerusalem.com

St George's College Jerusalem (SGCJ) is a continuing education centre of the Anglican Communion. It is an agency of the Episcopal Diocese of Jerusalem, with a mission to the local church within the Diocese, to the wider Anglican Church in the Middle East, and to the global Anglican Communion. The Dean of St. George's College is Canon Richard Sewell.

== History ==
The College was founded to train Palestinian seminarians. When George Francis Popham Blyth, a Church of England cleric with sympathy for High Church Anglicanism, became the bishop of the diocese in 1887, he found himself estranged from the evangelical societies which were working in Jerusalem at the time; the Church Mission Society and the London Jews Society. Therefore, he formed his own Jerusalem and the East Mission, purchased land outside of the Old City, and raised funds for the construction of St George's Collegiate Church (which is today the diocesan cathedral), and St George's College as well.

In 1962, it expanded its mission to include educating clergy and laity from other parts of the world.

Today the college focusses on pilgrimage, community, study, and reconciliation. Courses typically last 8, 10 or 14 days, and are open to clergy and laity of all denominations and any faith.

The major areas for SGCJ courses are:

- Bible and the Land, including archaeology and history
- Pilgrimage and Spirituality
- Interfaith: Jewish-Christian-Islamic dialogue
- Palestinian Contextual Theology

== Campus ==
The college is on the grounds of the Cathedral. It is in East Jerusalem, near the American Colony Hotel and is ten minutes’ walk from the Old City of Jerusalem. The school has a three-story building containing en suite rooms capable of housing up to 42 people. The 21,000 volume library is one of the largest English-language libraries in Jerusalem.

== See also ==
- St. George's School, Jerusalem
