= Suheil Dawani =

Palestinian Anglican bishop

The Most Reverend Suheil Dawani
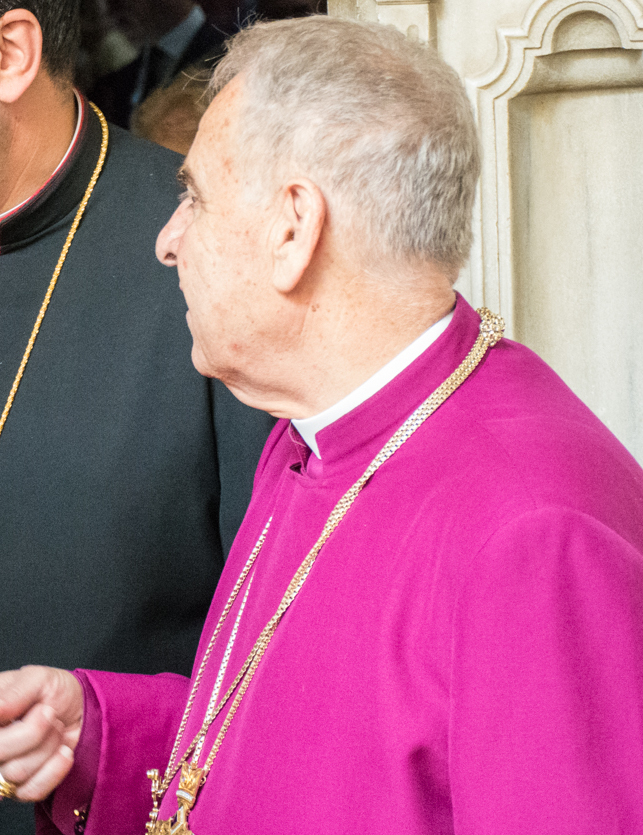
- Dawani in 2017
- Church: Episcopal Church in Jerusalem and the Middle East
- Diocese: Jerusalem (retired)
- In office: 2007–2021
- Other post: Archbishop in Jerusalem (2014–2021)

Orders
- Ordination: 1976 (deacon); 1978 (priest)
- Consecration: 6 January 2006 by Clive Handford

Personal details
- Born: 1951 (age 74–75) Nablus, Kingdom of Jordan

Suheil Salman Ibrahim Dawani (born Nablus, West Bank, 1951) is a Palestinian Anglican bishop.

He was the 14th bishop of the Anglican Diocese of Jerusalem from 15 April 2007, and Archbishop in Jerusalem from the restoration of the post in 2014, until his retirement in 2021. From 2017 to 2019 he was also the President Bishop of the Episcopal Church in Jerusalem and the Middle East. He is married and has three daughters.

== Ecclesiastical career ==
Dawani graduated with a B.A. at the Near East School of Theology in Beirut, Lebanon, in 1976. He was ordained an Anglican deacon in 1976 and a priest in 1978. He served for eight years at St. Andrew's parish in Ramallah, and St. Peter's in Bir Zeit, West Bank. He moved with his family to the United States in 1985, to study at Virginia Theological Seminary, where he completed his M.A. and began work on his Doctor of Ministry (D.Min). He was recalled to his diocese in 1987, and became priest at St. John's Episcopal Church in Haifa, Israel. He went to serve once again at the Ramallah and Bir Zeit parishes, from 1992 to 1997.

He was elected Secretary General of the Diocese of Jerusalem in 1997. He became then Canon for the Arabic-speaking congregation at St. George's Cathedral, in Jerusalem. He went to serve for a third time in Ramallah, from 2004 to 2007. He became Coadjutor Bishop on 15 June 2005 and was consecrated on 6 January 2006. He was enthroned as Bishop of Jerusalem on 15 April 2007. The same year he completed his D.Min at Virginia Seminary.

Dawani became Archbishop in Jerusalem in 2014 when synod voted to upgrade the concurrent role of representative of the Anglican Communion in the Holy Land from a bishopric to an archbishopric, as it had been previously from 1957 to 1976.

He was elected Primate of the Episcopal Church in Jerusalem and the Middle East on 17 May 2017, for a two and a half year mandate, and served until the autumn of 2019.

He retired in 2021, having reached the compulsory episcopal retirement age of 70.

== Views ==
He was critical of the Global Anglican Future Conference, that took place in Jerusalem, on 22-29 June 2008, stating that he believed that "reconciliation" was the way to solve divisions in the Anglican Communion. He addressed GAFCON III on its opening day, but wasn't a registered delegate of his province.

Anglican Communion titles
Preceded by Riah Abu El-Assal	Archbishop in Jerusalem; 2014–2021	Succeeded by Hosam Naoum
Preceded by Riah Abu El-Assal	Bishop in Jerusalem; 2007–2014	Succeeded by Hosam Naoum
Preceded by Mouneer Anis	President Bishop of the Episcopal Church in Jerusalem and the Middle East; 2017–2019	Succeeded by Michael Lewis
