= Faik Haddad =

Anglican Bishop of Jerusalem

The Rt Reverend Faik Ibrahim Haddad
- Anglican Bishop in Jerusalem
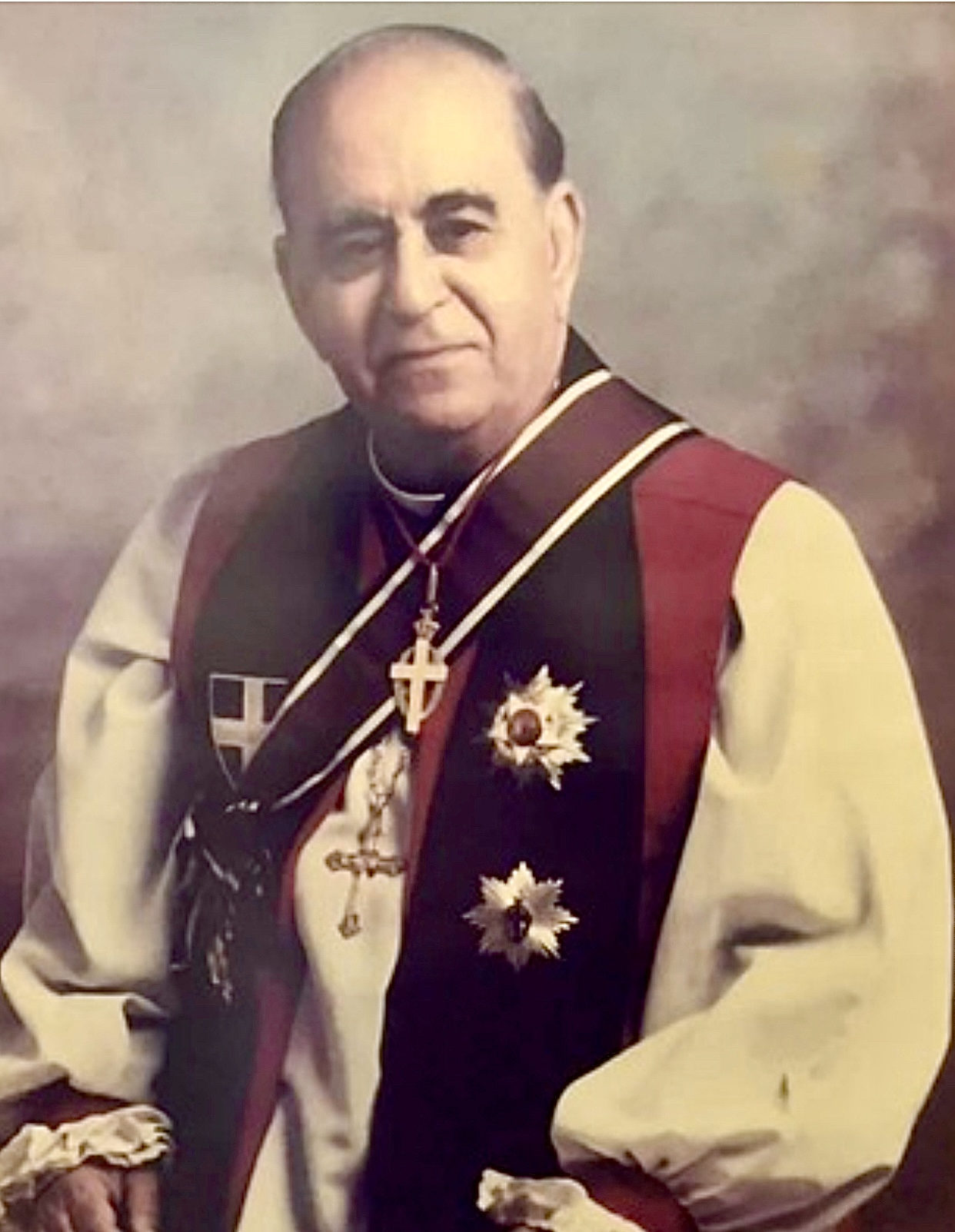
- Church: Episcopal Church in Jerusalem and the Middle East
- Diocese: Anglican Diocese of Jerusalem
- In office: 1976–1984
- Predecessor: Robert Stopford
- Successor: Samir Kafity
- Previous posts: Canon Residentiary; St George's Cathedral; Jerusalem

Orders
- Ordination: 1940 by Bishop Francis Brown
- Consecration: 29 August 1974 by Robert Stopford

Personal details
- Born: 28 December 1914 Tulkarm Palestine
- Died: 23 January 2001 (aged 86) Amman

Faik Ibrahim Haddad (فائق حداد [Fā'iq Ḥaddād], b. 28 December 1914 Tulkarm; d. 23 January 2001 Amman) was the 11th Anglican bishop of Jerusalem, he was the first bishop of Arab descent to head the diocese. He was also a Chaplain of the Order of Saint John.

== Background and education ==
Haddad was born in Tulkarm city on 28 December 1914 into a Palestinian family that had been active in Anglican life in the area. He grew up in Tulkarm city, and was educated in his city schools, then he was educated at St. George's School, Jerusalem and the American University of Beirut.

== Early career ==
Haddad was ordained deacon in 1939 and priested in 1940, both by the 7th bishop, Francis Brown. After a curacy at Acre he served at Jaffa, Amman and Nablus.

== Later career ==
In 1971 he was appointed a Canon Residentiary at St. George's Cathedral, Jerusalem and served there until his consecration as Coadjutor Bishop of Jerusalem on 29 August 1974. He became diocesan bishop on 6 January 1976 and served until 1984.

== Honors ==
- Order of the Holy Sepulchre, for his contribution to theological dialogue and church unity.
- Order of Saint John, by Queen of the United Kingdom Elizabeth II on 4 November 1977.
- Jordanian Order of Independence, by the King of Jordan Hussein bin Talal in 1983.

Anglican Communion titles
Preceded by Robert Stopford	Bishop of Jerusalem; 1976–1984	Succeeded by Samir Kafity
