= Edward Wheeler =

Edward Wheeler may refer to:

- Sir Oliver Wheeler (Edward Oliver Wheeler, 1890–1962), Canadian soldier
- Percy Charles Edward d'Erf Wheeler (1859–1944), English medical missionary
- Billy Edd Wheeler (Billy Edward Wheeler, 1932–2024), American songwriter, performer and writer
- Ted Wheeler (Edward Tevis Wheeler, born 1962), American politician from Oregon
- Ed Wheeler (1940s infielder) (Edward Raymond Wheeler, 1915–1983), baseball infielder
- Edward Lytton Wheeler (1854/55–1885), American dime novelist

== See also ==
- Edward Wheeler Scripture (1864–1945), American physician and psychologist
