= Weston Stewart =

British Anglican bishop

Weston Stewart

Weston Henry Stewart CBE (15 March 1887 – 30 July 1969) was a British Anglican bishop who served as Archdeacon for Palestine, Syria and Trans-Jordan between 1926 and 1943 and then Anglican Bishop in Jerusalem until 1957.

Stewart was born in 1887 in Bakewell in Derbyshire, the sixth child of Lucy Penelope (née Nesfield; 1850–1939) and Ravenscroft Stewart (1845–1921, priest). He was made a deacon in Advent 1910 (18 December) and ordained a priest the following Advent (24 December 1911) — both times by Arthur Winnington-Ingram, Bishop of London, at St Paul's Cathedral. In 1916 he was appointed Incumbent of Chelsea Old Church. In 1932 he married Margaret A. Clapham at Cambridge. In 1933 Stewart suggested acquiring land together with the British Mandate government for a new municipal cemetery on Mount Scopus next to the British Jerusalem War Cemetery, allowing each different Christian congregation to use a specific section for its burials. From 1938 to 1943 he was the Honorary Chaplain to the Palestine Police Force.

In 1943 he was appointed the seventh Anglican Bishop in Jerusalem and Dean of the Collegiate Church of St George the Martyr in Jerusalem following the sudden death of Francis Graham Brown in a car accident in November 1942. Because of World War II he found it difficult to travel to London for his consecration by William Temple, Archbishop of Canterbury, on St Matthew's Day 1943 (21 September), at Westminster Abbey. He laid the cornerstone of the Church of the Redeemer, Amman in 1949. In 1952, assisted by the former diplomat Stewart Perowne, he was involved in designing and organising model villages for Palestinian Arabs who had been made refugees as a result of the 1948 Arab–Israeli War. On 16 November 1956 Stewart consecrated and dedicated the newly built St Paul's Anglican Church in Kuwait.

On his return to England in 1957, Stewart became Rector of Cottesmore with Barrow, Rutland until 1964, and an Assistant Bishop of Peterborough and honorary canon of Peterborough Cathedral until his death in 1969 at Exton near Oakham, Rutland.

== Publications ==
- Stewart, Weston Henry 'Chelsea Old Church', J. B. Sears & Sons, London (1926)

Anglican Communion titles
Preceded by Francis Graham Brown	Bishop in Jerusalem; 1943 – 1957	Succeeded by Campbell MacInnes
