= Sean Semple =

Anglican bishop in Cyprus and the Middle East

The Right Reverend Sean Semple
- Bishop in Cyprus and the Gulf
- Church: Episcopal Church in Jerusalem and the Middle East
- Diocese: Diocese of Cyprus and the Gulf
- Installed: 24 May 2024
- Predecessor: Michael Lewis

Orders
- Ordination: 2009 (deacon); 2011 (priest)
- Consecration: 24 May 2024 by Hosam Naoum

Personal details
- Spouse: Jenny
- Children: 5
- Education: University of Natal; University of South Africa; University of KwaZulu-Natal; University of Nicosia

Sean Alexander John Semple is a South Africa-born Anglican bishop. Since 2024, he has been the sixth bishop of Cyprus and the Gulf in the Episcopal Church in Jerusalem and the Middle East, a diocese encompassing Cyprus and the Persian Gulf and Arabian Peninsula states of Bahrain, Iraq, Kuwait, Oman, Qatar and Yemen. Earlier in his clerical career, he served in three different provinces of the Anglican Communion.

== Early life and education ==
Semple was born in South Africa. His undergraduate studies in psychology and theology were at the University of Natal and the University of South Africa, followed by postgraduate studies in spirituality at the University of KwaZulu-Natal and in clinical psychology at the University of Nicosia.

== Ordained ministry ==
Semple began his ministry in the Uniting Presbyterian Church in Southern Africa, where spent a decade before being ordained a priest in the Anglican Church of Southern Africa in 2011. He served as clergy in the Diocese of Natal and in the Diocese of Cyprus and the Gulf, where he was associate priest in Larnaca. In 2015, Semple moved to England to serve in the Diocese of Hereford, first as vicar of Weobley with Sarnesfield and Norton Canon and later as rector of Ross with Walford and Brampton Abbotts. He was also rural dean of Ross and Archenfield.

In February 2024, Semple was elected bishop of Cyprus and the Gulf following the retirement of Michael Lewis. He was consecrated to the episcopate by Archbishop Hosam Naoum and enthroned at St. Christopher's Church in Bahrain on 24 May 2024. He is scheduled to be enthroned at St. Paul's Cathedral in Nicosia in June 2024.

== Personal life ==
Semple is married to Jenny, and together they have five children and a grandchild.

Anglican Communion titles
Preceded by Michael Lewis	Bishop in Cyprus and the Gulf; Since 2024	Incumbent
