= Church of the Redeemer, Amman =

Church in Amman, Jordan

Church of the Redeemer

Religion
- Affiliation: Anglican
- District: Diocese of Jerusalem
- Province: Episcopal Church in Jerusalem and the Middle East
- Leadership: Episcopal

Location
- Location: Amman, Hashemite Kingdom of Jordan

Architecture
- Established: 1927
- Completed: 1949

Specifications
- Spire: none
- Materials: cement, stone

The Church of the Redeemer (Arabic: كنيسة الفادي) is the largest church by membership of the Episcopal Diocese of Jerusalem, and is located in Amman, the capital of the Hashemite Kingdom of Jordan. The Church of the Redeemer is home to an Arab congregation as well as a meeting place of the English-Speaking Anglican Congregation (ESAC).

== History ==
The church was founded by missionaries from the Church Mission Society. "Riding their animals from Salt, twenty miles away, the missionaries began irregular meetings in private homes in 1919. The first Arab Episcopal congregation was formed constitutionally in 1927, and it met in a school auditorium." The cornerstone of the present structure was laid in 1949 by Weston Stewart, then Anglican Bishop in Jerusalem.

After the 1948 Arab-Israeli war a number of Christians from Palestine were expelled to the East Bank of the Jordan, including Amman. This helped to increase the membership numbers of the Church of the Redeemer.

== Today ==
Presently the Church of the Redeemer is the largest church in the Episcopal Diocese of Jerusalem by membership (about 1700 parishioners), exceeding the numbers of both the Cathedral Church of St George the Martyr in Jerusalem and the diocese's first-built church, Christ Church, Jerusalem. It is located near the First Circle, just off Rainbow Road. Located nearby are the diocesan offices and the Ahliyyah School for Girls, also a ministry of the diocese.

The vision of the Arab congregation, according to the diocesan website, is "...to reach out to all our parishioners and help them receive, understand, live, and witness to the Gospel in their lives; to continue our ministry and introduce new activities; to teach and prepare leaders to take part in the ministry of the church; build a new church in West Amman to service the community."

In January 2004 the Archbishop of Canterbury Rowan Williams preached a sermon wherein he attempted to empower and encourage the local Anglicans, saying:

...Christ frees us from imprisonment in the memory of our suffering. He doesn't take it away; but he helps us see how our suffering is like that of others – even our enemy's – and so gives us a language to speak with each other. And as he does this, he also frees us from the weakness we love; he gives us strength to take decisions, to think about the future. We readily forget that one of the gifts of the Holy Spirit is intelligence, the capacity to see our situation truthfully and act out of that vision, the capacity also to see what God is asking and to do it, even if it is a tiny step of faithfulness or love.

The church has programs for youth, young adults, women and its elderly members.

== See also ==
- Religion in Jordan
- Christianity in Jordan
- Eastern Orthodoxy in Jordan
- Catholic Church in Jordan
