= Michael Lewis (bishop) =

Anglican archbishop

The Right Reverend Michael Lewis
- Former Bishop in Cyprus and the Gulf and former President Bishop and Primate, Province of Jerusalem and the Middle East
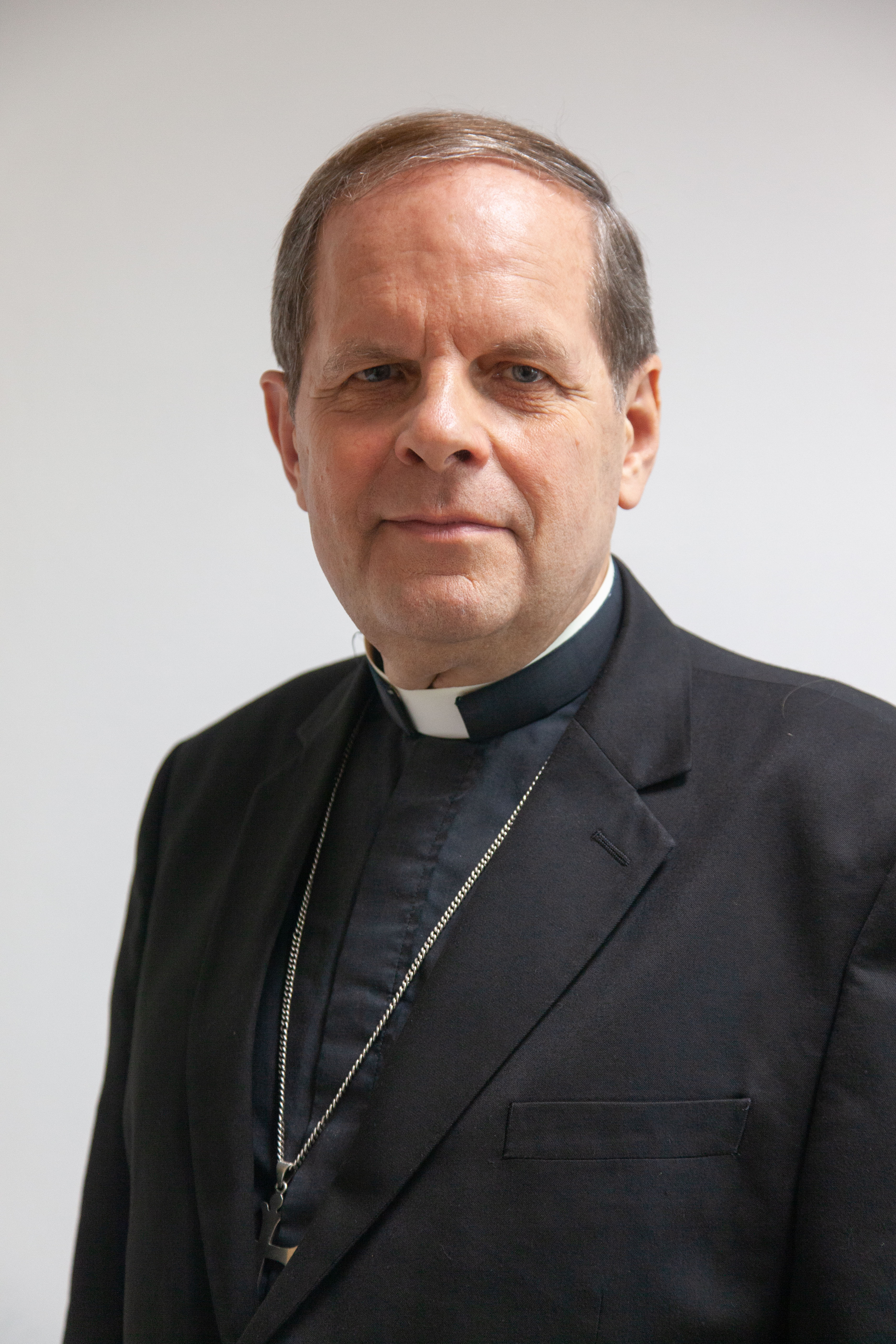
- Church: Episcopal Church in Jerusalem and the Middle East
- Diocese: Anglican Diocese of Cyprus and the Gulf
- Installed: 24 November 2007 in Nicosia
- Predecessor: Clive Handford
- Successor: Sean Semple
- Other posts: Bishop of Middleton (1999–2007)

Orders
- Ordination: 1978 (deacon); 1979 (priest)
- Consecration: 1999

Personal details
- Born: 8 June 1953 (age 73)
- Denomination: Anglican
- Parents: John & Jean (née Pope)
- Spouse: Julia (nee Lennox) (m. 1979; deceased)
- Children: 2 sons (one deceased); 1 daughter
- Education: Merton College, Oxford

Michael Augustine Owen Lewis (born 8 June 1953) is an Anglican bishop, born in England, who served in the Middle East. He was until 8 June 2023 the Anglican bishop in Cyprus and the Gulf in the Episcopal Church in Jerusalem and the Middle East. Within his former diocese lie Cyprus, Iraq, and the whole of the Arabian Peninsula, including the Arab states of the Persian Gulf. He was also president bishop and primate of the province of Jerusalem and the Middle East with the title of archbishop from 17 November 2019 to 12 May 2023.

== Early life and education ==
Lewis was born on 8 June 1953. He was educated at King Edward VI School, Southampton and Merton College, Oxford, where he read Oriental Studies (Hebrew, Aramaic, and Syriac) taking a BA in 1974 and MA in 1979. He was formed for the priesthood at Cuddesdon Theological College, taking his second Oxford degree in the Final Honour School of Theology in 1977.

== Ordained ministry ==
Lewis was ordained deacon in 1978 and priest in 1979. After a curacy at Christ the King, Salfords, Surrey, in the Diocese of Southwark he became Chaplain of Thames Polytechnic in 1980. He was Vicar of St Mary the Virgin, Welling, Southwark from 1984 to 1991 when he became Team Rector of Worcester South East and later Rural Dean of Worcester and Canon of Worcester Cathedral.

Consecration to the episcopate followed in 1999 when he was appointed to the suffragan bishopric of Middleton. In 2007 he was translated to Cyprus and the Gulf.

On 5 June 2011, he ordained the first female priest in the Middle East in Saint Christopher's Cathedral, Manama.

He is a member and currently co-chair of the International Commission for Anglican-Orthodox Theological Dialogue. He is a former member of the Anglican Consultative Council and a former consultant to the Inter-Anglican Standing Commission on Unity, Faith, and Order. For many years he has been Bishop-Visitor of the Community of the Sisters of the Love of God, Convent of the Incarnation, Fairacres, Oxford. Since 2021 he has been an Honorary Fellow of Merton College, Oxford.

He took office as President Bishop of the Episcopal Church in Jerusalem and the Middle East on 17 November 2019, in a ceremony held at St. Andrew Church, in Abu Dhabi, United Arab Emirates. His term as President Bishop ended on 12 May 2023, when he was succeeded by Hosam Naoum. He retired as diocesan bishop of Cyprus and the Gulf on 8 June 2023, remaining a bishop in the Province and residing in Cyprus.

Anglican Communion titles
Preceded by Stephen Venner	Bishop of Middleton; 1999–2007	Succeeded by Mark Davies
Preceded by Clive Handford	Bishop in Cyprus and the Gulf; 2007–2023	Succeeded by Sean Semple
Preceded by Suheil Dawani	President Bishop of the Episcopal Church in Jerusalem and the Middle East; 2019–2023	Succeeded by Hosam Naoum
