= George Blyth =

British Anglican bishop (1832–1914)

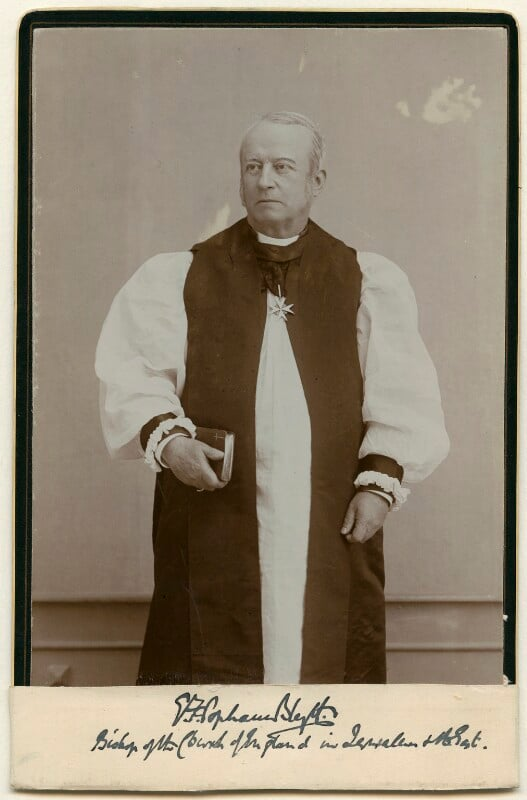
Blyth, c. 1891

George Francis Popham Blyth (25 April 1832 – 5 November 1914) was an Anglican bishop in the last decades of the nineteenth century and the first two of the twentieth.

== Life ==
He was educated at St Paul's School and Lincoln College, Oxford, and ordained in 1885. After a curacy at St Mary, Westport, he spent 20 years in India and Burma as a missionary (ending this part of his career as Archdeacon of Rangoon). In 1887 he was appointed the fourth Bishop of Jerusalem, a post he held for 27 years. A Sub-Prelate of the Order of St John of Jerusalem, he died on 5 November 1914. He had become a Doctor of Divinity (DD).

During his ministry, as an Anglo-Catholic, he found himself unable to convert either Christ Church, Jerusalem (under the LJS) or St Paul's (Jerusalem, under the evangelical Church Missionary Society) into his episcopal church. Therefore, he founded the Jerusalem and the East Mission and purchased land outside of the Old City walls, and raised the funds to build what is today St. George's Cathedral, Jerusalem. To raise funds for his own work he started the Good Friday Offering, still observed in the Episcopal Church of the USA.

Unlike his predecessor Samuel Gobat, who had resorted to proselytising among Christians of other, mostly Orthodox denominations, legalised by the Porte by a ferman in 1850 issued under the pressure of the Protestant powers of Britain and Prussia, Blyth preferred missions among Jews and Muslims. Proselytism among Christians had been criticised by proponents of the Anglican High Church faction. Blyth wanted to maintain good relations with the Orthodox churches.

Anglican Communion titles
Vacant Title last held by Joseph Barclay	Bishop of Jerusalem; 1887 – 1914	Succeeded by Rennie MacInnes
