= Rennie MacInnes =

Anglican Church Bishop

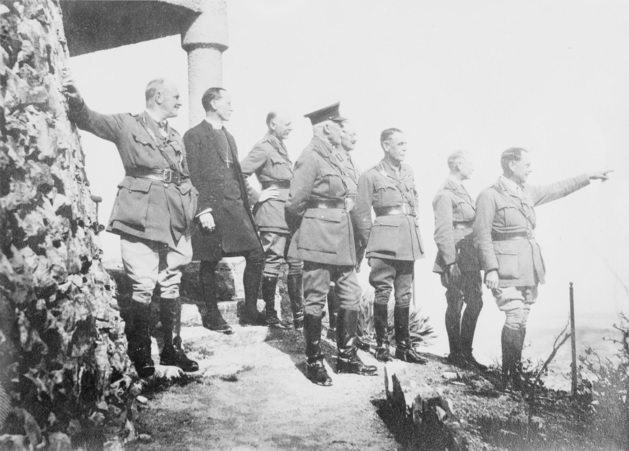
From left to right are, Sir Edmund Allenby, Rennie MacInnes, Malcolm Donald Murray, HRH the Duke of Connaught, Major General J S M Shea, Sir E S Bulfin, General Sir Harry Chauvel, Sir Philip Chetwode (March 19, 1918).

The Rt Rev Rennie MacInnes (23 July 1870 – 24 December 1931) was a bishop in the Anglican Church in the first third of the twentieth century.

== Biography ==
MacInnes was educated at Windlesham House School, Harrow and Trinity College, Cambridge. He was ordained in 1897. After a curacy at St Matthew's, Bayswater, he spent the rest of his career in the Middle East eventually becoming Bishop of Jerusalem.

== Family ==
His father was the MP Miles MacInnes and his grandfather was the noted general John MacInnes. He married in 1896 Janet Waldegrave Carr, they had several children:

- His son Angus Campbell MacInnes (1901–1977) followed him into Holy Orders, eventually becoming Bishop of Bedford before translation to his former See Jerusalem.
- Helena Ruth MacInnes, born in Cairo on 25 February 1903, and died on 19 January 1976.
- Joyce MacInnes, born on 12 November 1904, and died on 16 February 1969; married Dudley King Merer
- Donald Gordon MacInnes, born abt. 1907, died abt. 1969

Anglican Communion titles
Preceded by George Francis Popham Blyth	Bishop of Jerusalem; 1915 – 1931	Succeeded by George Francis Graham Brown
