= Christ Church, Jerusalem =

Christ Church Jerusalem
- "Jewish Protestant Church"
- كنيسة المسيح – القدس
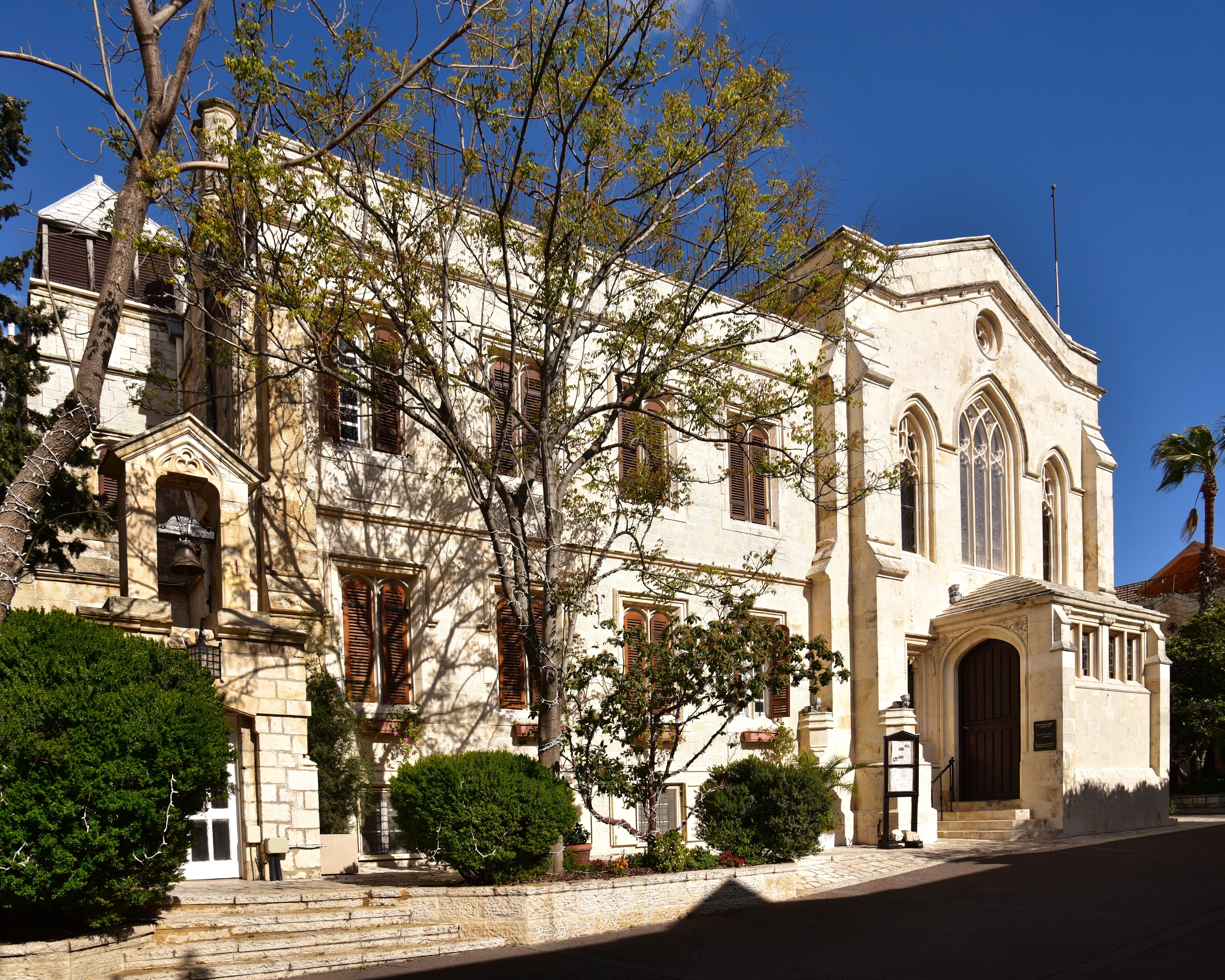
- Christ Church, Jerusalem

- Location in Old Jerusalem
- 31°46′34″N 35°13′45″E
- Location: Old City, Jerusalem
- Country: Israel
- Denomination: Anglican
- Previous denomination: Church of England
- Tradition: Low church
- Churchmanship: Evangelical, Conservatism
- Website: christchurchjerusalem.org

History
- Former name: Christ Church Cathedral Jerusalem
- Founder(s): London Society for Promoting Christianity Amongst the Jews, Michael Solomon Alexander
- Dedication: Jesus Christ
- Consecrated: 21 January 1849

Architecture
- Functional status: Active
- Completed: 1849

Administration
- Province: Episcopal Church in Jerusalem and the Middle East
- Diocese: Church's Ministry Among Jewish People

Clergy
- Rector: David Pileggi

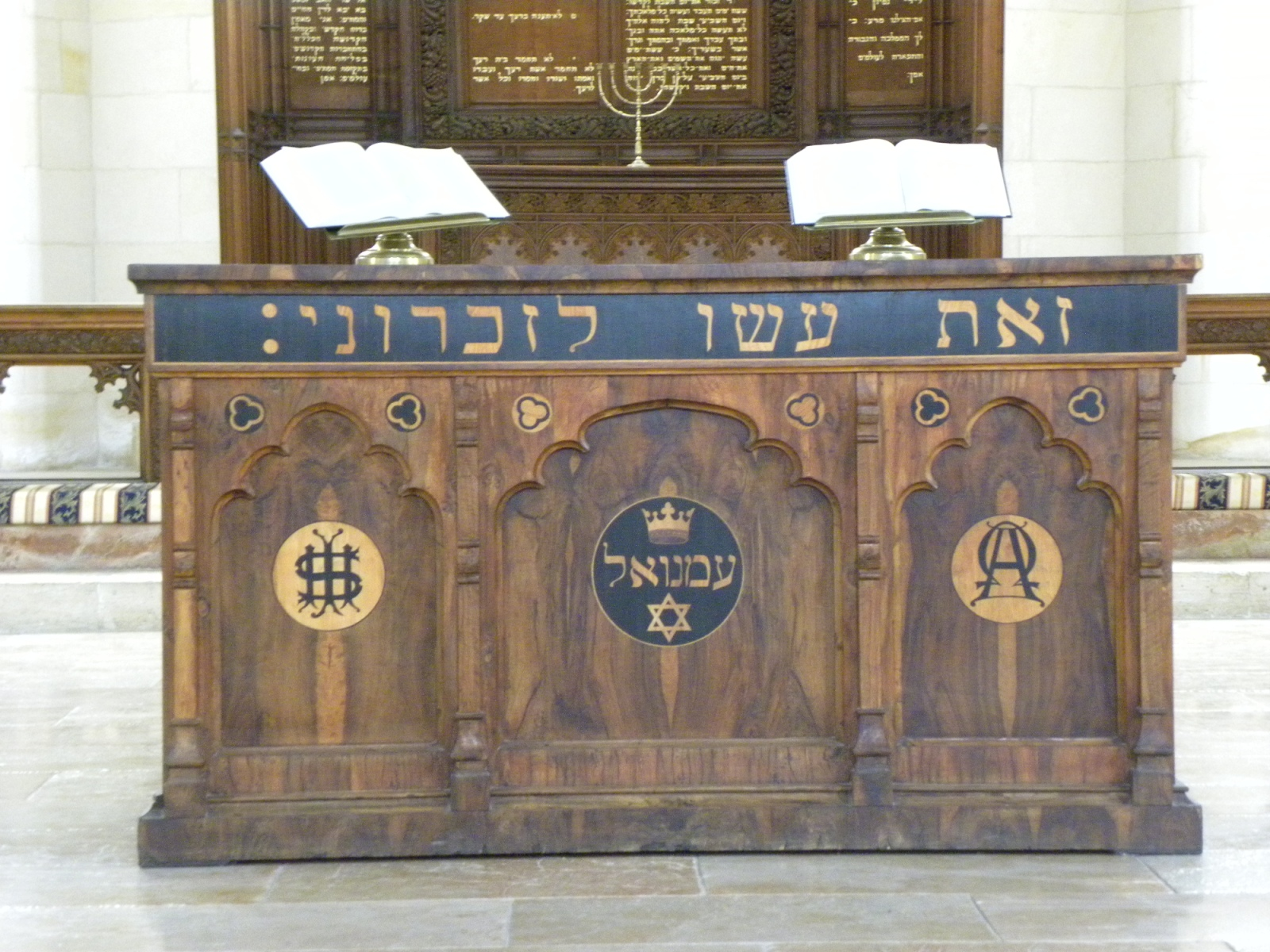
Altar with Hebrew inscription

Christ Church, Jerusalem (Hebrew: כנסיית המשיח), is an Anglican church located inside the Old City of Jerusalem, established in 1849 by the Church's Ministry Among Jewish People (CMJ). It was the original seat of the Anglican Bishop in Jerusalem until the opening of St. George's Cathedral, Jerusalem in 1899. From its inception, Christ Church has been supporting a form of Christianity focused on Jesus' Jewishness, offering Christian texts translated into Hebrew by its own leaders.

The building itself is part of a small compound just inside the Jaffa Gate opposite King David's citadel. Consecrated by Bishop Samuel Gobat on 21 January 1849, it is the oldest Protestant church building in the Middle East.

Its congregation is mainly composed of English-speaking Anglican Jewish Christians, with both Christian and Jewish festivals being celebrated.

== History ==
Originally named the "Apostolic Anglican Church", it was consecrated as "Christ Church" on 21 January 1849 by Bishop Samuel Gobat. Three architects worked on the church: the first (William Curry Hillier) died in 1840 of typhus, while the second (James Wood Johns) was dismissed and replaced by Matthew Habershon in 1843.

The construction of the church was met with considerable local and Ottoman opposition. Lord Shaftesbury and other prominent Restorationists lobbied consecutive Foreign Secretaries in its advocacy. On 18 March 1845 a petition signed by 1,400 clergy and 15,000 laity was presented to Lord Aberdeen in support of the project.

Christ Church was the seat of the Anglican Bishop in Jerusalem until the opening of St. George's Cathedral, Jerusalem in 1899.

Prior to the outbreak of the First World War, the Christ Church compound was also the site of the British Consulate. The building survived the 1947–1949 Palestine war and the Six-Day War intact and continues to function as an Anglican church with several English, Arabic and Hebrew speaking congregations. The current rector is David Pileggi.

The London Society for Promoting Christianity Amongst the Jews (now known as the Church's Ministry Among Jewish People or CMJ) helped finance the church's construction.

The church is conservative evangelical and supports GAFCON's Jerusalem Declaration.

=== Archaeology ===
In 1862, Conrad Schick described "a shaft by which access is obtained to a passage running east and west under the Mission premises" (i.e. Christ Church), and which subterranean passage was thought to be a water conduit or drain from the Roman period. The subterranean passage was re-examined in 2001 by archaeologists, Shimon Gibson and Rafael Y. Lewis. Lewis conjectured that the subterranean tunnel was part of the upper aqueduct system that carried water eastward towards the Temple Mount and that it was probably connected to the cisterns that were under Herod's palace in the Citadel area. After proceeding to a distance of little over 82 metres (269 ft) in an eastward direction, they could not proceed any further, as the passage was blocked by a caved-in roof.

== Description ==
In the church's apse a plaque contains the Apostles' Creed, the Lord's Prayer, and the Ten Commandments, all three in Hebrew.

== Gallery ==
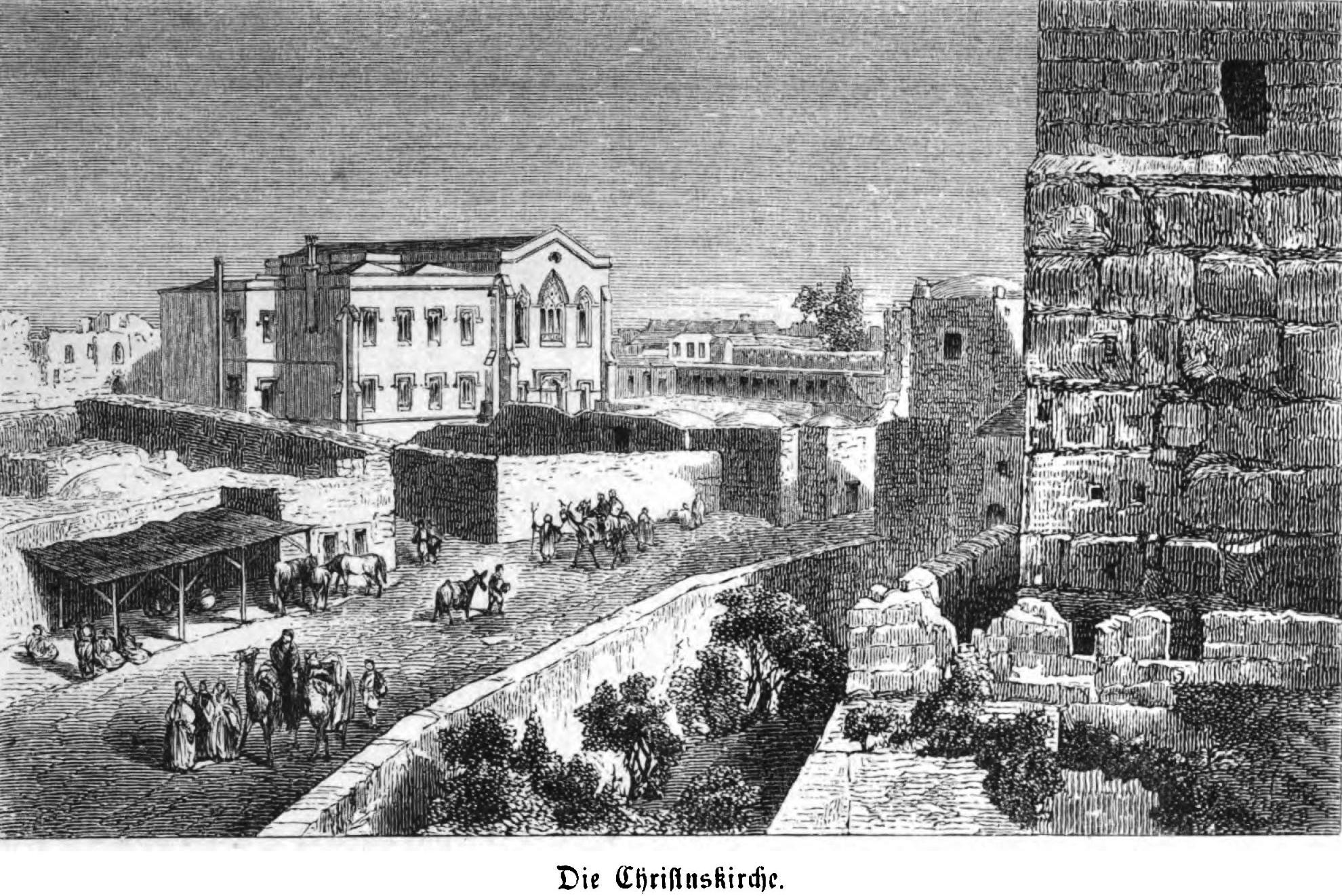
1862

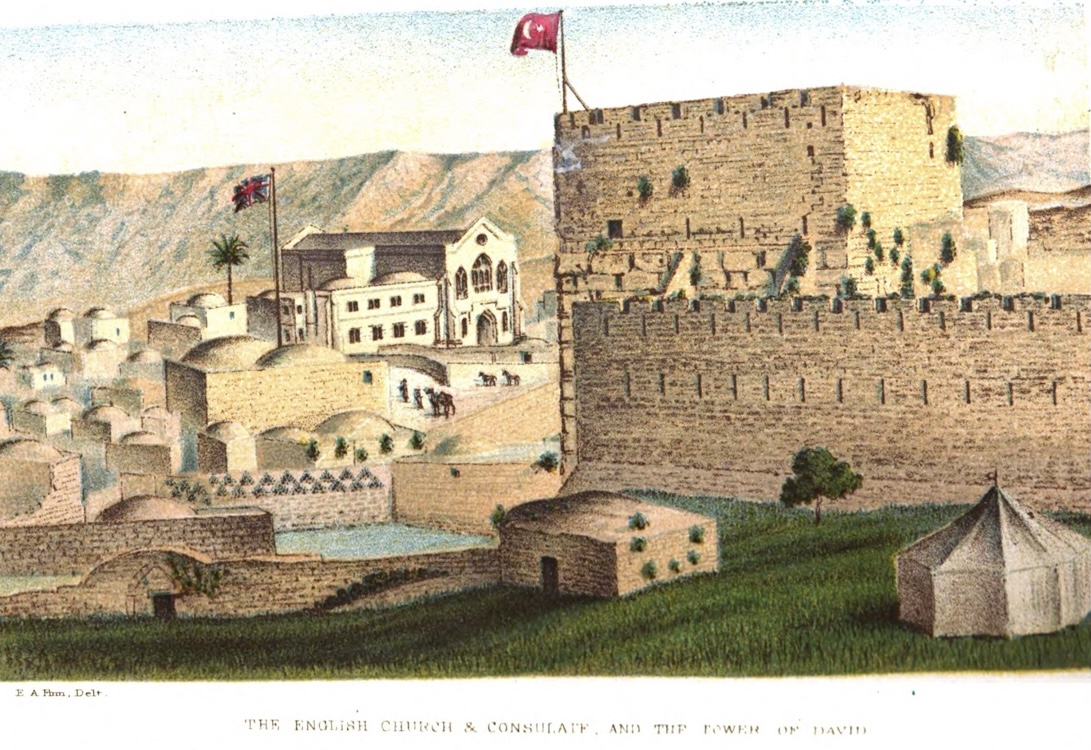
1878, with the Tower of David

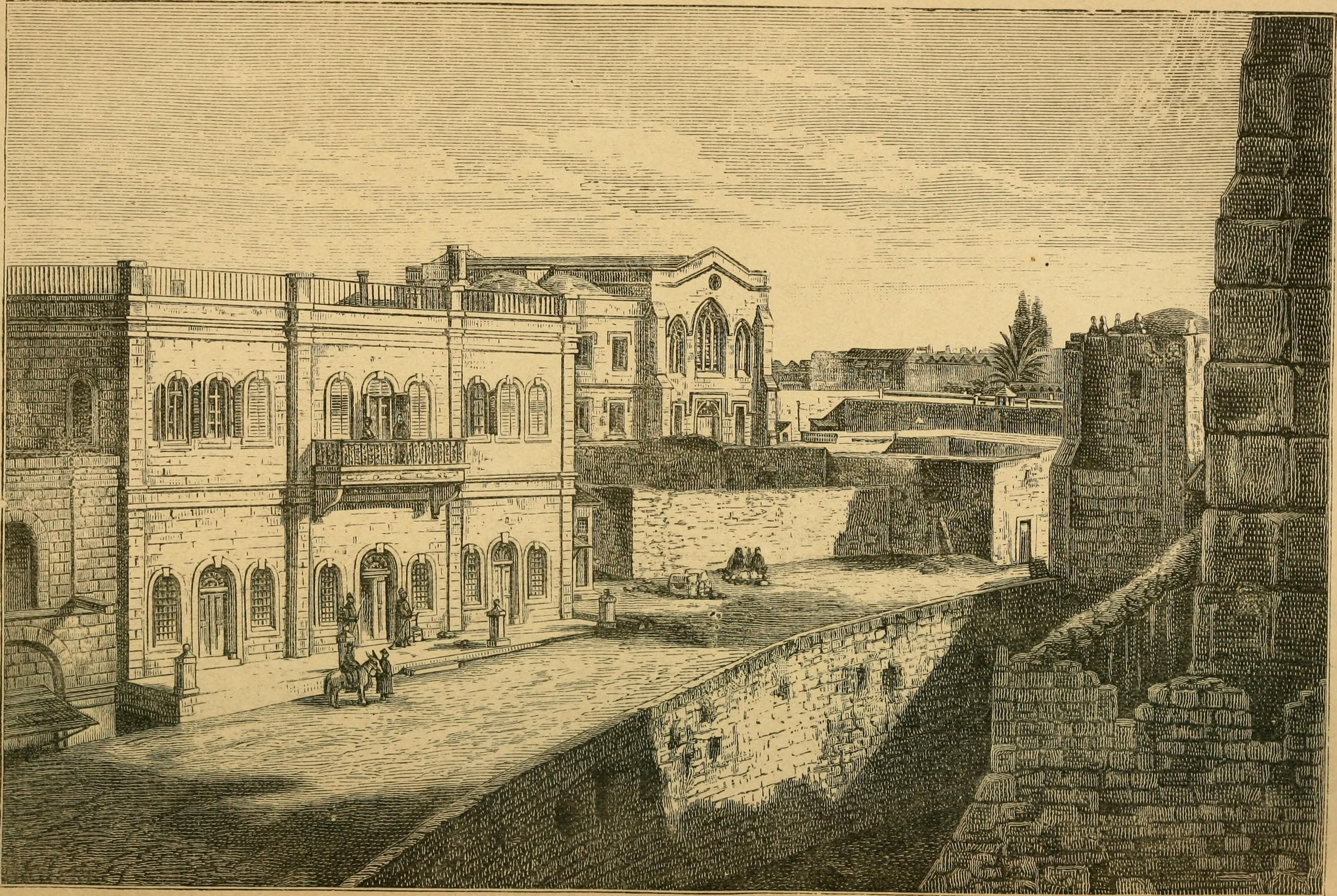
1884

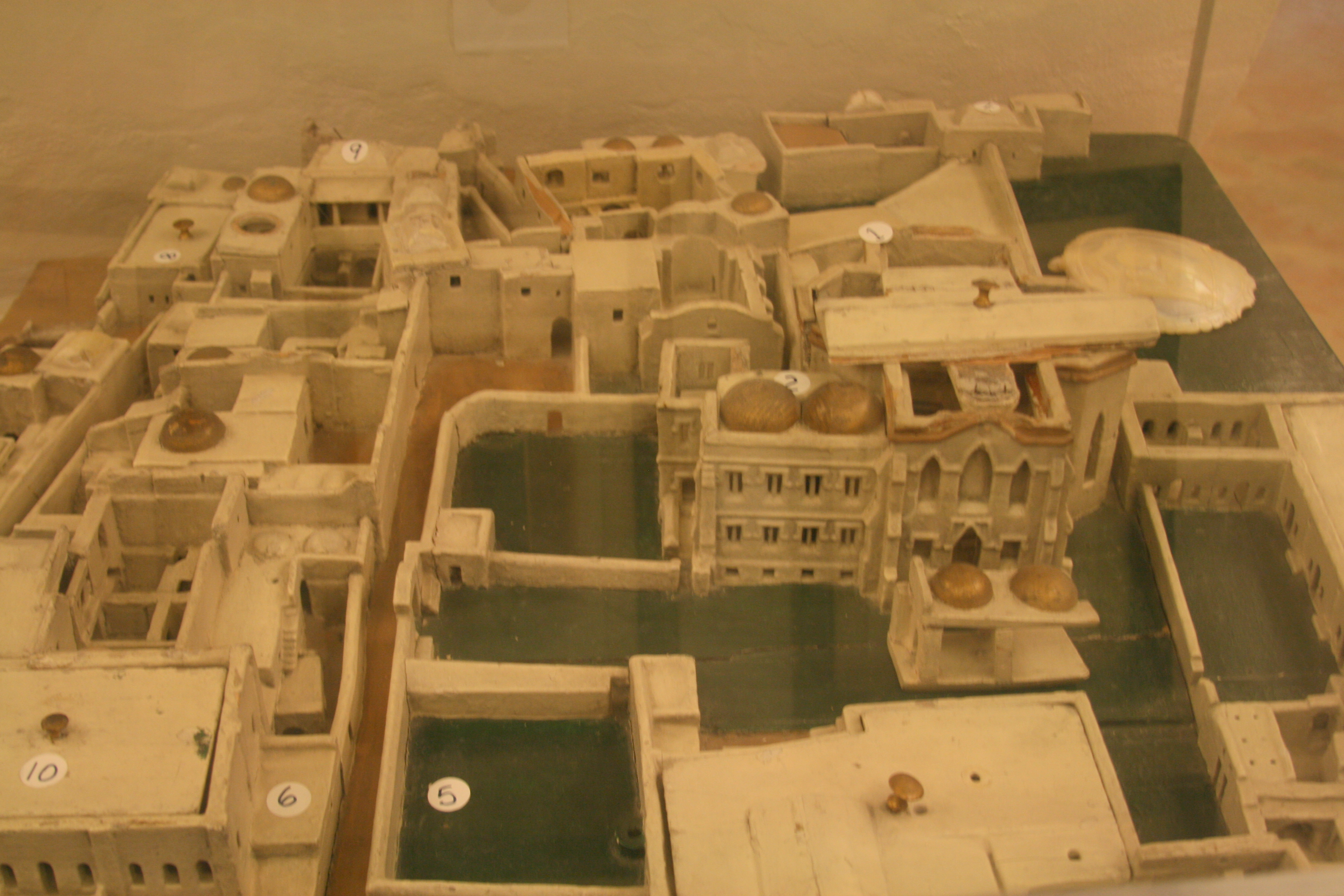
19th-century model of the church

== See also ==
- Anglican-German Bishopric in Jerusalem
- Messianic Jews ("Jews for Jesus")
- Conrad Schick (1822–1901), German Protestant missionary, educator, architect and archaeologist
- Moses Wilhelm Shapira (1830–1884), member of the Christ Church congregation
