= Hosam Naoum =

Anglican Archbishop of Jerusalem since 2021

The Most Reverend Hosam Naoum
- President Bishop of the Episcopal Church in Jerusalem and the Middle East; Archbishop in Jerusalem
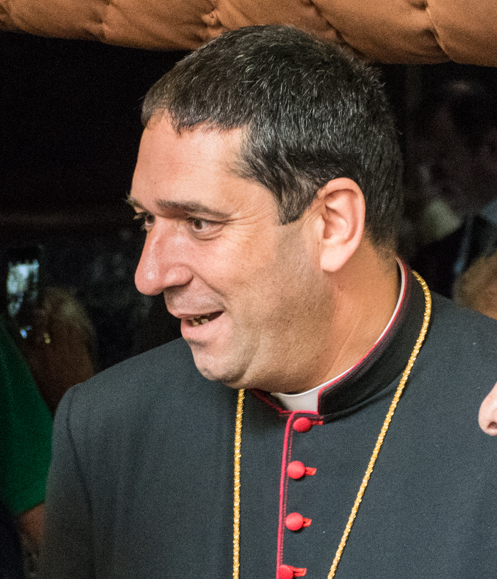
- Naoum in 2017
- Native name: حسام نعوم
- Church: Episcopal Church in Jerusalem and the Middle East
- Diocese: Jerusalem
- In office: 2021–present (as diocesan bishop); 2023–present (as president bishop)
- Predecessor: Suheil Dawani (as diocesan bishop); Michael Lewis (as president bishop)

Orders
- Consecration: 14 June 2020 by Michael Lewis

Personal details
- Born: 1974 (age 51–52)

Hosam Naoum (Arabic: حسام نعوم; born 1974) is a Palestinian Anglican bishop. Since 2021, he has been Archbishop in Jerusalem for the Episcopal Church in Jerusalem and the Middle East, and since 2023 he has been president bishop and primate of the province.

== Biography ==
Naoum grew up in Galilee. He trained for ordination at the College of the Transfiguration, the theological college of Anglican Church of Southern Africa, and studied theology at Rhodes University. He later completed Master of Theology (MTh) and Doctor of Ministry (DMin) degrees at the Virginia Theological Seminary.

He served at parishes in Nablus, Zababdeh and Jerusalem. He was Canon Pastor at St. George's Cathedral, Jerusalem from 2005 to 2012, and then served as its Dean until he was chosen to become a bishop.

On 14 June 2020, he was consecrated as coadjutor bishop for the Anglican Diocese of Jerusalem. His consecrators were Michael Lewis, as primate of the province of Jerusalem and the Middle East, assisted by Suheil Dawani (the then Archbishop in Jerusalem) and Peter Eaton (Bishop of Southeast Florida). He was installed as Archbishop in Jerusalem in 2021. In February 2023, he was elected vice-chair of the Anglican Consultative Council. In May 2023, he carried the Bible in the Royal procession at the Coronation of Charles III and Camilla. In 2025, he was selected as the Anglican Communion representative the Asia region on the Crown Nominations Commission to elect the next Archbishop of Canterbury.

Archbishop of Canterbury Sarah Mullally and Naoum issued a joint pastoral letter in 2026 stating that settler violence, forced displacement and systemic discrimination posed an existential challenge to Christians in the West Bank.

Anglican Communion titles
Preceded by Suheil Dawani	Archbishop in Jerusalem; 2021–present	Incumbent
Preceded by Michael Lewis	President Bishop of the Episcopal Church in Jerusalem and the Middle East; 2023–present	Incumbent
