= Samir Kafity =

Palestinian bishop(1932-2015)

Samir Hanna Kaffity (21 September 1932 – 21 August 2015) was a Palestinian Anglican bishop.

He was educated at the American University of Beirut and ordained in 1959. He was parish priest to the Palestinian congregation at St. George's Cathedral, Jerusalem and then held further incumbencies at St Andrew's Ramallah, St Peter's, Bir Zeit, and All Saints, Beirut. From 1977 he was a Lecturer at Birzeit University and then Archdeacon of Jerusalem. In 1982 he became Coadjutor Bishop of Jerusalem and two years later the Anglican Bishop in Jerusalem. Between 1984 and 1997, Kaffity was the second Palestinian Arab bishop. He served two five-year terms as the Provincial President-Bishop and Primate.

Since 1999, he had been Bishop-in-Residence at St Bartholomew's Episcopal Church, Poway, in the American state of California. Kafity died at his home in San Diego, California, on 21 August 2015.

== See also ==
- Faik Haddad
- Palestinian Christians

== Notes ==
Anglican Communion titles
| Preceded by Faik Haddad | Bishop of Jerusalem; 1984–1997 | Succeeded by Riah Abu El-Assal |
