= Percy Charles Edward d'Erf Wheeler =

- Born: 1859
- Died: 1944 (aged 84–85)
- Scientific career
- Fields: medicine
- Workplaces: British Hospital for the Jews

Percy Charles Edward d'Erf Wheeler FRGS (1859–1944) a medical missionary of the London Society for Promoting Christianity Amongst the Jews (now known as the Church's Ministry Among Jewish People), spent 24 years (1885–1909) as head of the English medical institution in Jerusalem. Wheeler dedicated the years he served in Palestine to promote the medical condition of the Jews as a means of missionary work. The most significant of his achievements was his leading role in the founding of the new British Hospital for the Jews in Jerusalem, the flagship of the British presence in Palestine, inaugurated in 1897.
