= Francis Graham Brown =

British Anglican bishop of Jerusalem

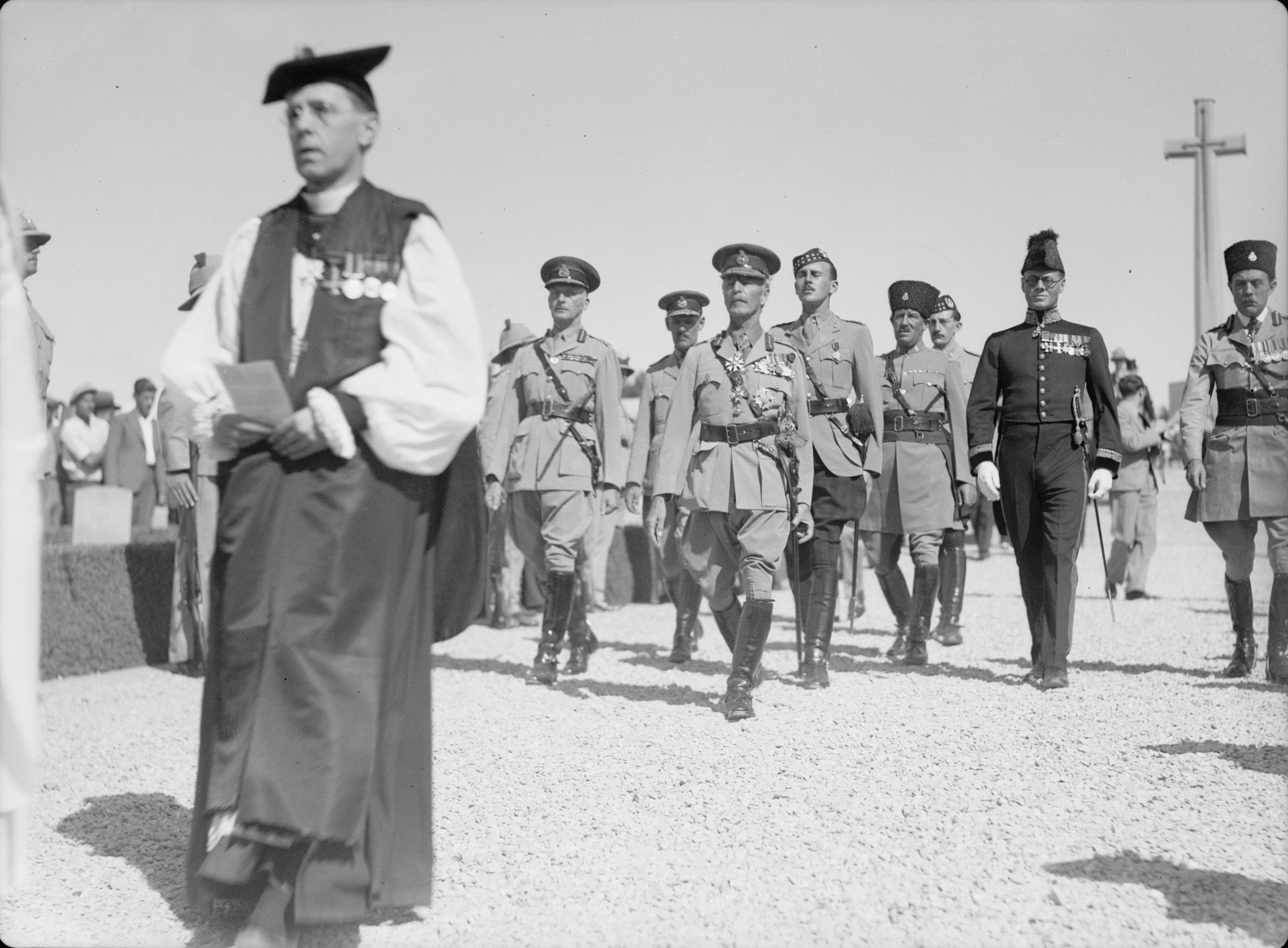
Bishop Francis Graham-Brown leading a procession in 1936, with (among others) General Dill and the High Commissioner Wauchope

George Francis Graham-Brown OBE (27 January 1891 – 23 November 1942) was an Anglican bishop in the second quarter of the 20th century.

== Life ==
Graham-Brown was educated at Monkton Combe School and St Catharine's College, Cambridge.

After World War I service with the King's Own Scottish Borderers during which he was wounded in the head and eventually invalided out of the service, and three years as a History Master at his former school, he was ordained in 1922.

He was successively Chaplain, Vice-Principal then Principal of Wycliffe Hall, Oxford. In 1932 he was appointed the sixth Bishop in Jerusalem, a post he held for 10 years. He was consecrated a bishop on the Nativity of St John the Baptist (24 June) 1932, at St Paul's Cathedral, by Cosmo Lang, Archbishop of Canterbury. He was also a Sub-Prelate of the Order of St John of Jerusalem.

Having become a Doctor of Divinity (DD), he died in post on 23 November 1942 in a car accident. His grave is preserved in Mount Zion Cemetery, Jerusalem.

Anglican Communion titles
Preceded by Rennie MacInnes	Bishop of Jerusalem; 1932–1942	Succeeded by Weston Stewart
