= Anglican Diocese of Jerusalem =

Anglican jurisdiction in part of the Middle East

Diocese of Jerusalem

Location
- Country: Syria, Israel, Jordan, and Lebanon
- Ecclesiastical province: Episcopal Church in Jerusalem and the Middle East

Statistics
- Congregations: 29
- Members: c. 7000

Information
- Denomination: Anglicanism
- Cathedral: St. George's Cathedral, Jerusalem

Current leadership
- Archbishop: Hosam Naoum

Map
- Diocese of Jerusalem Diocese of Cyprus and the Persian Gulf Diocese of Iran

Website
- www.j-diocese.org

The Anglican Diocese of Jerusalem (Arabic: أبرشية القدس الأنغليكانية) is the Anglican jurisdiction for Israel, Palestine, Jordan, Syria and Lebanon. It is a part of the Episcopal Church in Jerusalem and the Middle East, and has diocesan offices at St. George's Cathedral, Jerusalem.

Today, Anglicans constitute a large portion of Jerusalem's Christians. The diocese has a membership of around 7,000 people, with 35 service institutions, 29 parishes, 1500 employees, 200 hospital beds, and 6,000 students. The bishop of the diocese was styled Bishop in Jerusalem from 1841 until 1957 and from 1976 until 2014, and since then has been styled Archbishop in Jerusalem, as he was between 1957 and 1976.

== History ==
Lord Shaftesbury sought to turn his vision of a restored and converted Israel into official government policy. His plan was Jewish resettlement in Palestine and the creation of an Anglican church on Mount Zion. In March 1838, a consulate was opened in Jerusalem and a vice-consul was appointed "to afford protection of the Jews generally" in Palestine.

The Damascus Incident of 1840 provided a motive for more concrete British intervention on behalf of the Jews in Turkey. Under the influence of Lord Ashley, Lord Palmerston, the Foreign Secretary, called for the Porte to facilitate the settlement of Jews from all Europe and Africa in Palestine in addition to allowing Jews living in the Turkish empire "to transmit to the Porte, through British authorities, any complaints which they might have to prefer against the Turkish authorities." The latter was granted by the Sultan in February 1841. Equality of treatment to Jewish subjects was guaranteed in April. The British government wanted to prop up the ailing Ottomans, and admitting Jews to Palestine with "the wealth they would bring with them would increase the resources of the Sultan's dominions."

=== Anglican Bishopric of Jerusalem ===
The establishment of an Anglican bishopric in Jerusalem was one of the goals of the London Society for Promoting Christianity among the Jews. The plan also had the support of the Protestant king Frederick William of Prussia; he appointed an envoy to England specifically to aid Lord Ashley in the project. Their joint efforts failed mainly in overcoming opposition from Anglo-Catholic groups in England, under the Oxford Movement, which was trying to reconcile the English Church with Rome.

Michael Alexander, a converted Jew and professor of Hebrew and Arabic at King's College, was chosen by Palmerston (on the advice of Ashley) to be the first Bishop in Jerusalem. The Bill creating the Bishopric of Jerusalem was passed by parliament and received royal assent on 5 October 1841. For the time being the diocese would be run in joint effort with the united Evangelical Church in Prussia which rejected the idea of Apostolic succession, held by Anglicans.

Much like the general failure of the Jews' Society to bring about any considerable mass conversion of the Jews, the initial impact the diocese was disappointing. Elliot Warburton on visiting Bishop Alexander's church in Jerusalem found a total congregation of eight converted Jews and one or two tourists.

=== Nineteenth century ===
In 1849, Christ Church, Jerusalem near Jaffa Gate became the first Anglican/Lutheran church in the city, and in 1871 Christ Church in Nazareth was consecrated.

The Anglo-Prussian Union ceased to function in 1881, and no bishop was appointed between 1881 and 1887, and from 1887, the missionary effort continued solely under Anglican auspices.

In 1888, George Blyth established the Jerusalem and the East Mission which was instrumental in raising funds for projects and missions throughout the Middle East. Saint George's Cathedral was built in 1898 in Jerusalem as a central focus for the diocese.

=== Twentieth century ===
Although the diocese began as a foreign missionary organisation, it quickly established itself as part of the Palestinian community. In 1905, the Palestine Native Church Council was established to give local Arabs more say in the running of the church. This led to an increase in the number of Arab clergy serving the diocese.

In 1920, the Diocese of Egypt and the Sudan was formed, separate from the Diocese of Jerusalem, with Llewelyn Gwynne as its first bishop. In the 1920s the Anglican Bishop in Jerusalem founded St. George's College as a training seminary for local clergy.

In 1957, the bishop in Jerusalem was elevated to the rank of an archbishop, albeit under the primatial authority of the archbishop of Canterbury. The archbishop of Jerusalem had metropolitan oversight of the entire area of the current province with the addition of the Sudan (five dioceses in all). In that same year, Najib Cubain was consecrated bishop of Jordan, Lebanon and Syria, the first Arab bishop, assistant to the archbishop of Jerusalem. During the 1950s, political unrest in Egypt left the diocese in the care of four Egyptian clergy under the oversight of the Archbishop of Jerusalem.

In 1976, the structure of the Anglican church in the region was overhauled, with the Diocese of Jerusalem becoming an ordinary bishopric, and one of four dioceses forming the Province of the Episcopal Church in Jerusalem and the Middle East. The archbishop of Canterbury ceased to have metropolitan authority over the diocese, which came to be held by a rotating presiding bishop of the Province and the Central Synod, comprising the four dioceses. When a bishop reaches the age of 68, a coadjutor bishop is required to be elected to work alongside the bishop for two years, before the bishop's retirement at age 70.

Also in 1976, Faik Haddad became the first Palestinian Anglican bishop in Jerusalem.

=== Diocese of Jordan, Lebanon and Syria ===
In July 1957, the Diocese of Jordan, Lebanon and Syria was carved out of the existing Diocese of Jerusalem. Its only bishop (the area's first Arab bishop) was Najib Cubain; the diocese was reabsorbed upon the provincial reorganisation of 1976.

== Bishops and Archbishops ==
Arms of the Diocese of Jerusalem

From 1957 to 1976 the ordinary held the rank and title of Archbishop of Jerusalem. In 1976 the new province of Jerusalem and the Middle East was created, with four dioceses, and a Presiding Bishop elected from amongst them, but the Bishop of the Diocese of Jerusalem also bore the title Bishop in Jerusalem as a representative in the Holy Land of the Anglican Communion.

In 2014 the synod debated this international representative role, and determined that it was sufficiently important to restore the status of an archbishopric, with the bishop to be re-styled Archbishop in Jerusalem. The Anglican Communion office subsequently re-titled the Bishop of Jerusalem in its directory as Archbishop in Jerusalem. This is a non-metropolitan archbishopric, although the holder is eligible (with the other diocesan bishops of the province) to be elected as metropolitan.

The fifteenth bishop of the diocese and Archbishop in Jerusalem is Hosam Naoum, who was previously Dean of St George's Cathedral, and on 14 June 2020 was consecrated a bishop, to serve as coadjutor Bishop of Jerusalem, to succeed Dawani as Archbishop in Jerusalem automatically upon his retirement in 2021.

=== List of Anglican Bishops in Jerusalem ===
Bishop in Jerusalem (under the joint auspices of the Church of England and the Evangelical Church in Prussia):

- 1841–1845: Michael Alexander. Christ Church, Jerusalem dedicated in 1849.
- 1846–1879: Samuel Gobat. He opened 42 schools and ordained the first two Palestinian priests at Christ Church, Nazareth
- 1879–1881: Joseph Barclay
- 1881–1887: vacant

Bishop in Jerusalem (under sole Anglican auspices):

- 1887–1914: George Blyth. Established the Palestine Native Church Council in 1905 and the Jerusalem and the East Mission
  - 1908–1914: Llewellyn Gwynne, the sole Bishop suffragan of Khartoum (later the first Bishop of Egypt and the Sudan)
- 1914–1931: Rennie MacInnes
- 1932–1942: Francis Graham Brown
- 1943–1957: Weston Stewart

Archbishop in Jerusalem:

- 1957–1969: Campbell MacInnes
- 1969–1974: George Appleton
- 1974–1976: Robert Stopford served as vicar general. The province/diocese were substantially reorganised during Stopford's time.

Bishop in Jerusalem:

- 1976–1984: Faik Ibrahim Haddad, the first Palestinian Arab bishop. (Consecrated by Stopford, 29 August 1974, at St George's Cathedral, Jerusalem, to be coadjutor-bishop.)
- 1984–1997: Samir Kafity, the second Palestinian Arab bishop. He served two five-year terms as the Provincial President-Bishop and Primate.
- 1997–2007: Riah Abu El-Assal
- 2007–2014: Suheil Dawani (previously coadjutor bishop since 2006)

Archbishop in Jerusalem:

- 2014–2021: Suheil Dawani
- 2021–present: Hosam Naoum

=== Controversies ===
The fourteenth bishop of the diocese was Suheil Dawani who was enthroned at St. George's Cathedral in Jerusalem on April 15, 2007, having previously been coadjutor bishop. He was Archbishop in Jerusalem from the restoration of the archbishopric in 2014. In August 2010, Israel declined to renew the residency permits for Dawani and his family, claiming the bishop had been engaged in fraudulent land deals on behalf of the Palestinian Authority, an allegation strenuously denied by the bishop and the diocese. After legal proceedings were commenced, and following pressure from a number of Christian churches and leaders, the permits were renewed on 26 September 2011.

The thirteenth bishop of the diocese was Riah Abu El-Assal, who retired on March 31, 2007 at the prescribed retirement age of 70 years. The Diocese of Jerusalem was forced to take legal action against Riah following his retirement, over the ownership of the Bishop Riah Educational Campus, a school established by him when he was bishop.

== Congregations ==
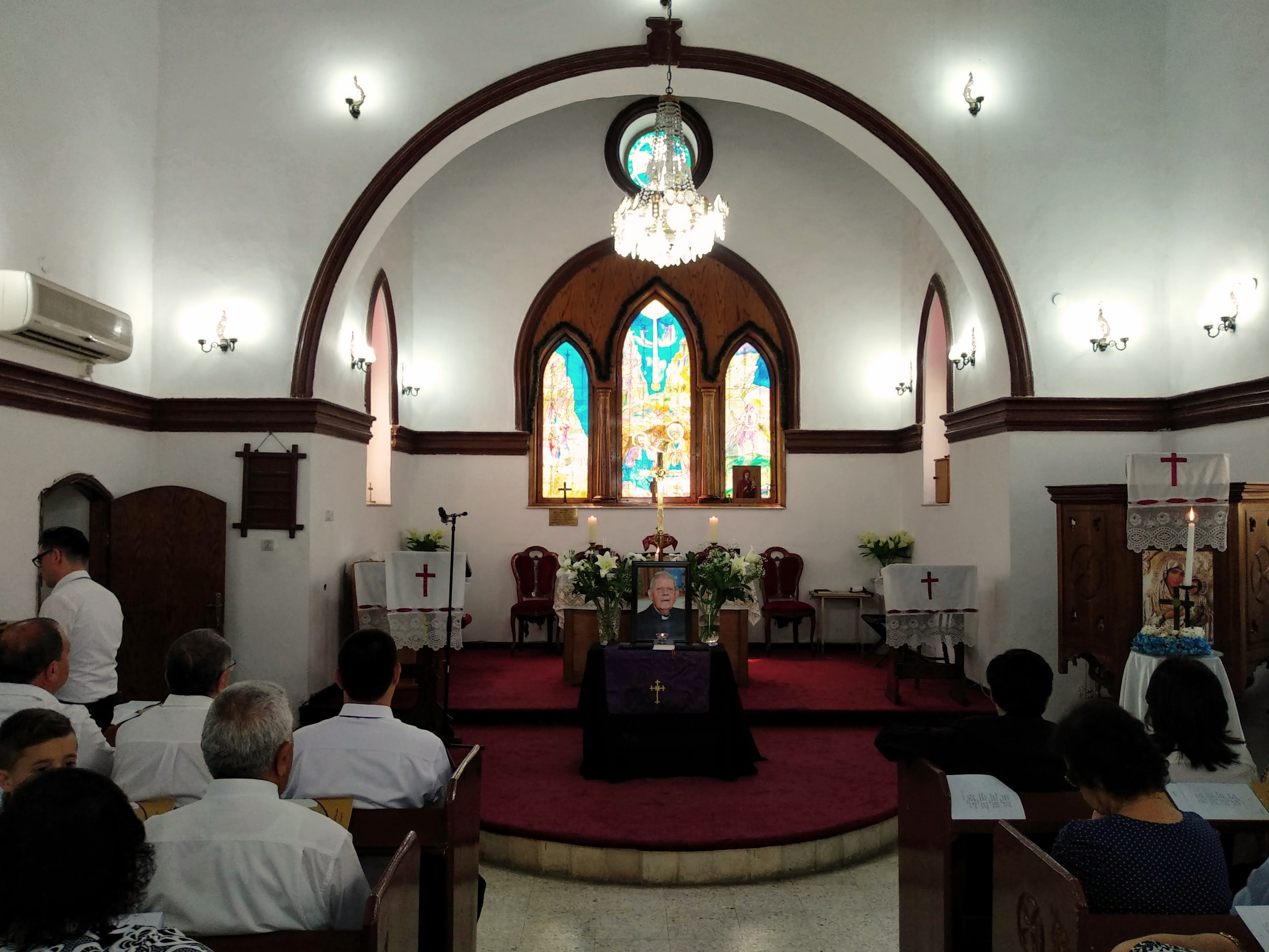
Altar of the Anglican Episcopal Emmanuel Church in Ramleh

The parish churches of the diocese include:

- St. George's Cathedral, Jerusalem
- St Paul's Church, Jerusalem
- Church of the Redeemer, Amman, Jordan
- Theodore Schneller Chapel, Amman, Jordan
- Saviour Church, Zarka, Jordan
- The Virgin Mary Episcopal Church, Irbid, Jordan
- St Luke's Church, Marka, Jordan
- The Church of the Good Shepherd, Salt, Jordan
- St John the Baptist Church, Husn, Jordan
- Sts Peter & Paul Church, Aqaba, Jordan
- St Andrew's Church, Ramallah, Palestine
- St Peter's Church, Birzeit, Palestine
- Good Shepherd Church, Rafidia, Palestine
- St Philip's Church, Nablus, Palestine
- St Matthew's Church, Zababdeh, Palestine
- St Philip's Chapel, Gaza City, Palestine
- St Paul's Church, Shefa-'Amr, Israel
- Church of the Holy Family, Reineh, Israel
- Emmanuel Church, Ramleh, Israel
- St John's & St Luke's Church, Haifa, Israel
- Christ Church, Nazareth, Israel
- Saviour Church, Kufr Yasif, Israel
- St. Peter’s Church, Jaffa, Israel
- St. Saviour Church, Acre, Israel
- Christ the King, Tarshiha, Israel
- All Saints' Episcopal Church, Damascus, Syria
- All Saints' Episcopal Church, Beirut, Lebanon

== See also ==
- Anglican-German Bishopric in Jerusalem
- Church Mission Society
- Episcopal Church in Jerusalem and the Middle East
  - Church Missionary Society in the Middle East and North Africa
- Jerusalem and the East Mission
- London Jews Society
- Palestinian Christians
- Theodore Edward Dowling
