= Michael Alexander (bishop) =

German-British rabbi, convert to Christianity, and Anglican bishop

Michael Solomon Alexander
- Bishop of Jerusalem
- Diocese: Jerusalem
- Installed: 1842
- Term ended: 23 November 1845
- Predecessor: none
- Successor: Samuel Gobat

Orders
- Ordination: 1 November 1832
- Consecration: 7 December 1841

Personal details
- Born: 1 May 1799 Schönlanke, Netze District, Kingdom of Prussia (today Trzcianka, Poland)
- Died: 23 November 1845 (aged 46) Bilbeis, Ottoman Egypt
- Buried: Jerusalem
- Denomination: Anglican

Michael Solomon Alexander (1 May 1799 – 23 November 1845) was the first Anglican Bishop in Jerusalem.

== Life ==
He was the second son and one of five children born to Alexander Wolff. His ancestors may have come to Prussia from England, or may have been in Schönlanke for many generations. His education in the Talmud began when he was seven years old, and from age sixteen to twenty, he was a teacher in his community of both Talmud and the German language. He emigrated to England in about 1820, and became a private tutor for a Jewish family in Colchester. Then he became rabbi at Norwich. Here he came into contact with William Marsh, a stalwart of the London Society for Promoting Christianity Amongst the Jews (now known as the Church's Ministry Among Jewish People or CMJ).

Attempting to flee Christian influences, he accepted the post of teacher and shochet at Plymouth. He taught Hebrew to the Rev. Benjamin Golding of Stonehouse church. In 1825, he converted to Christianity.

Soon afterwards, he and his wife, Deborah Levy, went to live in Dublin, where he taught Hebrew and was ordained a priest in the Anglican Church in 1827. This was followed by working with CMJ, firstly in Danzig between 1827 and 1830, and then in London between 1831 and 1841.

He was professor of Hebrew at King's College London from 1832 until 1841 and helped Alexander McCaul of the CMJ to revise the Mission's translation of the New Testament into Hebrew in 1835 and to translate the Book of Common Prayer into Hebrew.

=== Diocese of Jerusalem ===
In 1841 the British and Prussian Governments as well as the Church of England and the Evangelical Church in Prussia entered into a unique agreement - the establishment of a Protestant Bishopric in Jerusalem. Alexander was proposed as the first Protestant bishop. He was appointed bishop of the United Church of England and Ireland in Jerusalem, and was ordained a bishop on 7 December 1841 at Lambeth Palace. He arrived in Jerusalem in January 1842.

Alexander's position was always a controversial one. He worked alongside the CMJ pioneer, John Nicolayson, in consolidating the Protestant presence in Jerusalem. Various institutions were set up under his leadership, including a School of Industry for training Jewish believers in basic trades, an Enquirers House, a Hebrew College, and the first hospital in Palestine. His presence greatly antagonised the Jewish leadership, who considered him an apostate, as well as provoking the other major churches to consolidate their presence in Jerusalem. The Roman Catholic church subsequently sent a Patriarch to (or re-established the medieval Latin Patriarchate in) Jerusalem to counteract Alexander's influence.

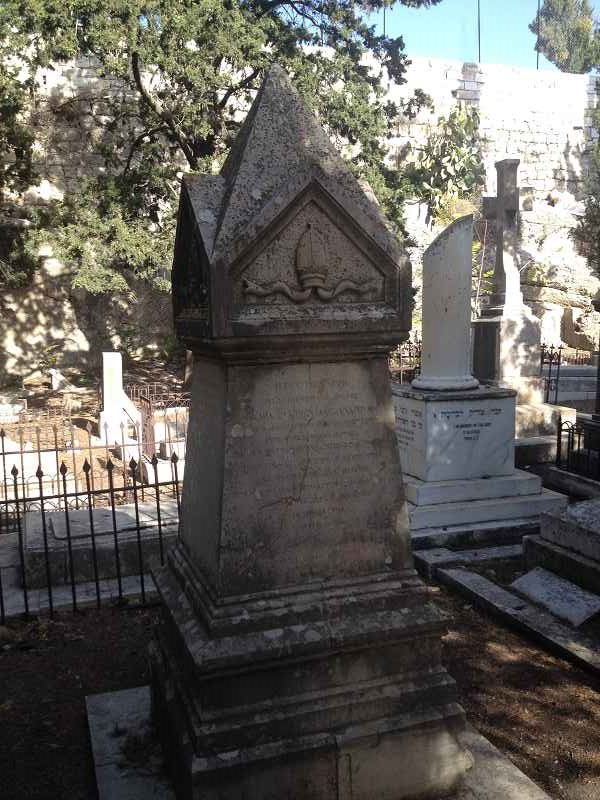
Alexander's grave, in the back Nicolayson's adorned with a truncated column

He died in Bilbeis, Egypt while returning to England. He was buried in Mount Zion Cemetery, Jerusalem. He was succeeded by Bishop Samuel Gobat.

He had nine daughters (Sarah Jane Isabella Wolff, Fanny Vincent Steele, Deborah Rebecca Marsh, Anna, Elizabeth, Mary Anne, Louisa, Salome, and Emilie) and two sons (Michael Robert Richard Hawtrey and Alexander Benjamin).

== Sources ==
- "Alexander, Michael Solomon" . Dictionary of National Biography. London: Smith, Elder & Co. 1885–1900.
- Crombie, Kelvin (2006) A Jewish Bishop in Jerusalem: The Life Story of Michael Solomon Alexander. Jerusalem: Nicholayson's

Anglican Communion titles
New see	Bishop of Jerusalem; 1841–1845	Succeeded by Samuel Gobat
