= Anglo-Prussian bishopric in Jerusalem =

Joint see of Anglican and Prussian Churches (1841–86)

The Anglo-Prussian bishopric in Jerusalem was a Protestant episcopal see based in Jerusalem between 1841 and 1886. It was a joint venture of the Church of England and the Evangelical Church in Prussia.

The bishopric was established as a result of multiple missionary efforts in the Holy Land and the 1840 expedition by the Quadruple Alliance. King Frederick William IV of Prussia saw an opportunity to establish a strong position for Evangelical Christians, as the Armenian, Greek, and Latin churches had long-standing treaty-sanctioned corporations and powerful protectors, while Protestants lacked regular standing. The king sent Bunsen to Queen Victoria to propose a joint Protestant bishopric, which was welcomed by the Archbishop of Canterbury and the Bishop of London.

The endowment for the see was set at £30,000, ensuring an annual income of £1,200 for the bishop, who was to be appointed alternately by Prussia and England, with the Archbishop of Canterbury retaining veto power over Prussian nominations. The see was organized similarly to an Anglican bishopric, with its holder initially subject to the metropolitan authority of Canterbury. The bishop's jurisdiction extended beyond Palestine to Protestants in Syria, Mesopotamia, Egypt, and Ethiopia, exercised according to the canons and usages of the Church of England.

== Background ==
As a result of more than one missionary effort in the Holy Land in the earlier years of the century, and of the expedition sent thither in 1840 by the so-called Quadruple Alliance, Frederick William IV of Prussia thought the occasion favourable for establishing a firm position for Evangelical Christians in that country. The Armenian, Greek, and Latin churches had long possessed the advantage of permanent corporations under treaty sanction, the two latter having also powerful protectors (Russia and France respectively), while Protestants had no regular standing. The king therefore sent Bunsen on a special mission to Queen Victoria to lay before the archbishop of Canterbury and the bishop of London, who welcomed the proposal, a plan for the joint erection of a Protestant bishopric under the protection of England and Prussia.

== The proposal ==
The endowment of the see was fixed at £30,000 to secure an annual income of £1,200 for the bishop, who was to be appointed by Prussia and England alternately; the archbishop of Canterbury, however, had a veto on the Prussian nomination; in other particulars, the organization of the see was practically that of an Anglican diocese, and its holder was at first subject to the metropolitan authority of Canterbury. His jurisdiction, which extended provisionally beyond Palestine over the Protestants of all Syria, Mesopotamia, Egypt, and Ethiopia, was to be exercised according to the canons and usages of the Church of England.

== The English act of parliament ==
The Bishops in Foreign Countries Act 1841 (also called the Jerusalem Bishopric Act), which came into force on 5 October, authorized the consecration of a bishop for a foreign country who need not be a subject of the British crown nor take the oath of allegiance, while, on the other hand, the clergy ordained by him would have no right to officiate in England or Ireland. It was agreed by both parties that the bishop should protect and aid German communities, among whom the cure of souls should be provided for by German clergy, ordained according to the English rite after examination and subscription of the three ecumenical creeds; that the liturgy was to be compiled from those received in the Evangelical Christian Church of Prussia and authorized by the Archbishop of Canterbury; that confirmation was to be administered to the Germans by the bishop after the English form. These far-reaching concessions aroused great dissatisfaction among the German Lutherans (Old Lutherans and Neo-Lutherans), and the project was unfavorably received by the Tractarian party in England on opposite grounds. For John Henry Newman, the fact that the Anglican Church was willing to set up a merged Church overseas with German Protestants who did not believe in the apostolic succession was further conclusive proof that the Anglican Church was Protestant in essence, and the affair was one of the catalysts for his conversion to Catholicism.

== The bishopric in practice ==
The first bishop appointed under the agreement was a Jewish convert, Michael Alexander, who had been converted while serving as a rabbi at Plymouth in 1825. He entered the ministry of the Church of England, became a missionary of the London Society for the Conversion of the Jews, and professor of Hebrew and rabbinical literature at King's College London. He was consecrated a bishop on 7 November 1841 to serve as the first "Bishop in Jerusalem". He took up his residence in Jerusalem at the beginning of 1842 and died in the desert near Cairo on 23 November 1845. Alexander was succeeded by Samuel Gobat, a native of Crémines in the Bernese Alps, and a former missionary in Ethiopia. In his time it became evident that the joint bishopric could not endure.

The German community showed a notable increase, numbering 200 members in 1875, and important charitable works were connected with it; a provisional chapel for their worship was erected in 1871, to be replaced by the larger church dedicated in the presence of the German emperor on 31 October 1898. Meantime the relations between the German and English congregations had become more and more merely nominal. Bishop Gobat was succeeded in 1879 by an Englishman, Joseph Barclay, who died two years later, and the next nomination came to Germany.

The final separation was brought about by the insistence of the Church of England that the bishop should subscribe the Thirty-nine Articles and be consecrated according to the English rite. Germany objected to this, and the agreement was finally abolished by the king of Prussia (the Summus episcopus) on 3 November 1886. Since that time, the bishopric has been maintained by the Church of England alone under an Anglican Bishop of Jerusalem. The Lutheran mission evolved into what is now the Evangelical Lutheran Church in Jordan and the Holy Land.

== Bibliography ==
- [Anon.] (1895). Der Herr baut Jerusalem. Eine Denkschrift über das Werk der evangelischen Kirchen in Jerusalem. Berlin.
- Heckler, W. H. (1883). The Jerusalem Bishopric. London.
- Hope, J. R. (1842). The Bishopric of the United Church of England and Ireland at Jerusalem, Considered in a Letter to a Friend (2nd ed. revised ed.). London: C. J. Stewart.
- McCaul, A. (1866). Jerusalem, its Bishop, its Missionaries. London.
- Meyer, P. (1914) "Jerusalem, Anglican-German Bishopric in", Schaff-Herzog Encyclopedia of Religious Knowledge
- Riley, A. (1889). Progress and Prospects of the Archbishop of Canterbury's Mission to the Assyrian Christians. London.
- Smith, H. (1846). The Protestant Bishopric in Jerusalem. London.
