= Jerusalem and the Middle East Church Association =

The Jerusalem and the Middle East Church Association (JMECA), previously known as the Jerusalem and the East Mission (JEM), was founded in 1888 by Bishop George Blyth, the fourth bishop of the Diocese of Jerusalem.

== History ==
In 1888 Blyth established a fund to maintain the diocesan properties and ministries and develop them. The fund was named The Jerusalem Bishopric Mission Fund, later renamed The Jerusalem and the East Mission (JEM), which is today known as the Jerusalem and the Middle East Church Association (JMECA). In 1939 the Archbishop of Canterbury’s Assyrian Mission came fully under the control of J&EM.

In 1965 a new constitution was adopted. It was later amended in 1977 and 1985. On July 1, 2015 JMECA became a Limited Company Charity with a revised constitution, a new charity number (11584760) and a Company Number (09067852). The historical documents of the JMECA are located at St Antony's College, Oxford University.

== Jerusalem and The East Mission Trust ==
The Archbishop of Canterbury is the patron of the JMECA, which is governed by a Council with broad experience in the Middle East. The Trust is not itself a charity. Rather, it is a non-profit which administers the assets of JMECA and a number of other charities that provide support for the Province of Jerusalem and the Middle East. The Trust is administered by a Standing Committee which includes the Directors of The Jerusalem and the East Mission Trust Limited, which was established in 1929.

== Current mission ==
JMECA supports the Episcopal Church in Jerusalem and the Middle East, which is a province of the worldwide Anglican Communion. The province has four Dioceses based in Jerusalem, Cairo, Cyprus, and Iran.
