= Church's Ministry Among Jewish People =

Anglican missionary society

The Church's Ministry Among Jewish People (CMJ, since 1995; formerly the London Society for Promoting Christianity Amongst the Jews, or the London Jews' Society) is an Anglican missionary society founded in 1809. Other previous names were Church Missions to Jews, The Church's Mission to the Jews, and The Church's Ministry Among the Jews.

Please note that the Church of Scotland, including the ephemeral (United) Free Church of Scotland (1843-1900), has developed its own, parallel Scottish mission to the Jews.

== History ==
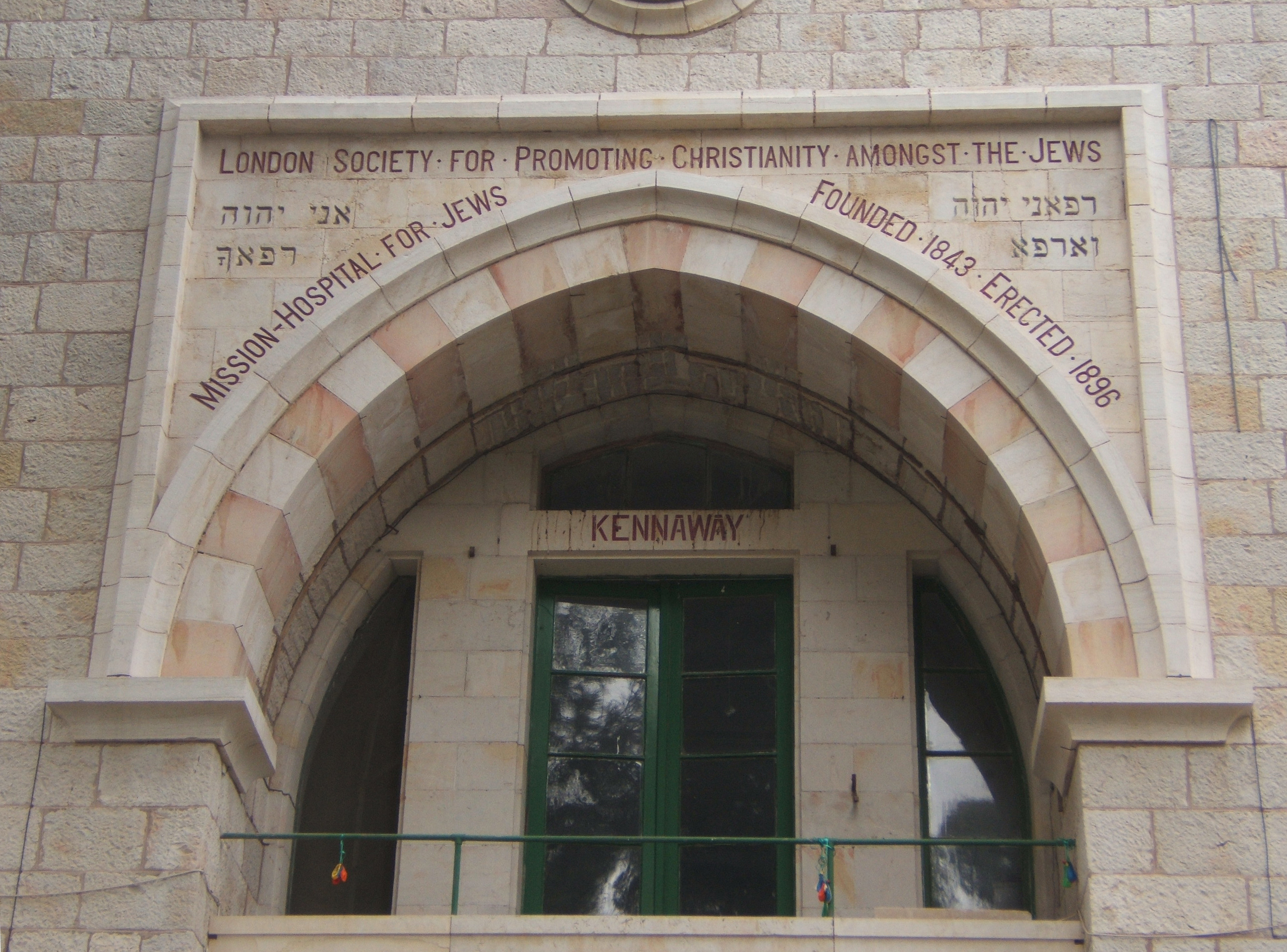
Hospital founded by the London Jews Society, Jerusalem

The society began in the early 19th century, when leading evangelical Anglicans, including members of the influential Clapham Sect such as William Wilberforce, and Charles Simeon, desired to promote Christianity among the Jews. In 1809 they formed the London Society for Promoting Christianity Amongst the Jews. The missionary Joseph Frey is often credited with the instigation of the break with the London Missionary Society. A later missionary was C.W.H. Pauli.

Abbreviated forms such as the London Jews' Society or simply The Jews' Society were adopted for general use. The original agenda of the society was:

- Declaring the Messiahship of Jesus to the Jew first and also to the non-Jew
- Endeavouring to teach the Church its Jewish roots
- Encouraging the physical restoration of the Jewish people to Eretz Israel - the Land of Israel
- Encouraging the Hebrew Christian/Messianic Jewish movement

The society's work began among the poor Jewish immigrants in the East End of London and soon spread to Europe, South America, Africa and Palestine. In 1811, a five-acre field on the Cambridge Road in Cambridge Heath, east London, was leased as a centre for missionary operations. A school, training college and a church called the Episcopal Jews' Chapel were built here. The complex was named Palestine Place. In 1813, a Hebrew-Christian congregation called Benei Abraham (Children of Abraham) started meeting at the chapel in Palestine Place. This was the first recorded assembly of Jewish believers in Jesus and the forerunner of today's Messianic Jewish congregations. The chapel building later became part of the Bethnal Green Hospital administrative buildings.

=== Overseas mission ===
The London Jews' Society was the first such society to work on a global basis. In 1836, two missionaries were sent to Jerusalem: Dr. Albert Gerstmann, a physician, and Melville Peter Bergheim, a pharmacist (and later banker), who opened a clinic that provided free medical services. By 1844, it had become a 24-bed hospital.

In its heyday, the society had over 250 missionaries. It supported the creation of the post of Anglican Bishop in Jerusalem in 1841, and the first incumbent was one of its workers, Michael Solomon Alexander. The society was active in the establishment of Christ Church in the city, the oldest Protestant church in the Middle East, completed in 1849.

In 1863, the society purchased property outside the walls of the Old City of Jerusalem. In 1897, they opened a hospital on the site, designed by architect Arthur Beresford Pite. Today, the building houses the Anglican International School Jerusalem, which is operated by the society.

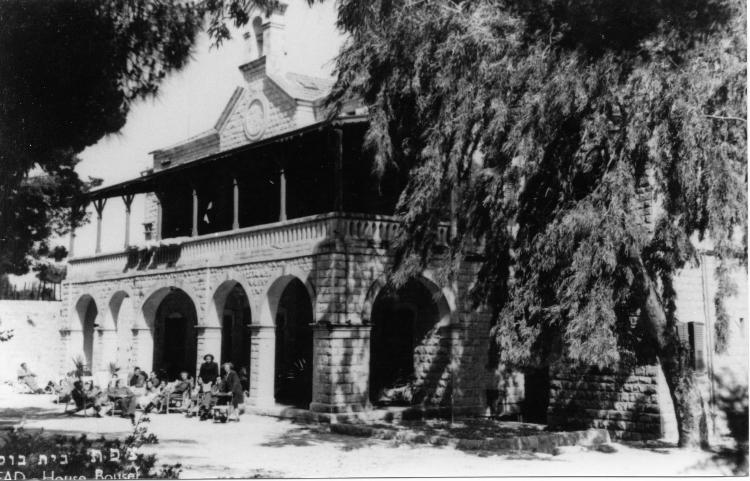
Beit Bussel. Safed. Built by the London Society in 1904 as a mission hospital, later purchased by the JNF and used as Yiftach Brigade's headquarters during the 1948 war.

In 1914, the society was described as:

...the oldest, largest, richest, most enterprising, and best organized of its type, and has auxiliary societies throughout the British Isles and Canada. The society, whose income in 1900-01 was £46,338, with an expenditure of £36,910, employed at 52 missionary stations 199 workers, among them 25 clergymen, 19 physicians, 34 female missionaries, 20 lay missionaries, 35 colporteurs, 58 teachers, and 8 apothecaries. Of these, 82 were converts from Judaism. Of the 52 stations 18 are in England, 3 in Austria, 1 in France, 4 in Germany, 2 in the Netherlands, 1 in Italy, 4 in Rumania, 1 in Russia, 1 in Constantinople; in Asia there are 10 stations, among them Jerusalem with 27 workers; in Africa there are 7 stations. About 5,000 Jews have been baptized by the society since its foundation. Its principal organs are the Jewish Missionary Intelligence and the Jewish Missionary Advocate.

In response to changing attitudes towards outreach and the Jewish people, the society has changed its name several times over the years, first to Church Missions to Jews, then The Church's Mission to the Jews, followed by The Church's Ministry Among the Jews, and finally to the current name of The Church's Ministry Among Jewish People, which was adopted in 1995. It operates under the governance of the Vincent Society.

The society's historic archives are stored by the Bodleian Library in Oxford and University College London. Histories of the society were published in 1908 and 1991.

== Current activities ==
The organisation is one of the ten official mission agencies of the Church of England. It currently has branches in the United Kingdom, Israel, Ireland, France, the US, Canada, South Africa, Hong Kong and Australia.

The organisation marked its bicentenary in 2009 with four special church services around the United Kingdom.

== Current issues ==
The missionary focus of CMJ attracts criticism from the Jewish community who regard such activities as highly detrimental to Jewish-Christian relations. For example, Rabbi Shmuel Arkush of Operation Judaism, a Jewish organisation dedicated to opposing missionaries, has called in 1992 for CMJ to be disbanded.

Also in 1992, George Carey became the first Archbishop of Canterbury in 150 years to decline to be the Patron of CMJ, a decision that was praised by Jewish leaders and reported as the front-page headline in The Jewish Chronicle. Subsequent reports confirmed that the archbishop, the most senior figure in the Anglican Church, did not wish to endorse the organisation's missionary work, which he felt was damaging to interfaith relations.

In addition, CMJ has often adopted a Zionist position, and expressed the view that the Jewish people deserved a state in the Holy Land decades before Zionism began as a movement, in accordance with the Restorationism of its founders. It supported the establishment of the state of Israel in 1948 and continues to engage in pro-Israel advocacy. This has drawn criticism from opponents such as Stephen Sizer. A detailed response to Sizer's criticisms was produced by the then General Director of CMJ, Tony Higton.

A further source of tension has been the unusual situation whereby the Anglican Bishop in Jerusalem did not receive jurisdiction over Christ Church once St. George's Cathedral was constructed in the city in 1899. Many of the bishops have not shared CMJ's convictions or their desire to take the gospel to the Jewish community, but Christ Church belongs to CMJ, which has always had the status of an independent Anglican society, and consequently the bishops do not have control over the church or its activities.

== See also ==
- Christian Restorationism
- Christian Zionism
- Christian Zionism in the United Kingdom
- Christianity and Judaism
- Christianity in the 19th century
- Evangelism
- Evangelicalism
- Hebrew Christian Movement
- Jewish Christians
- Mission (Christian)
- Percy Charles Edward d'Erf Wheeler

== Bibliography ==
- Gidney, W. T., Joseph Wolff, (Biographies of eminent Hebrew Christians), London Society for Promoting Christianity Amongst the Jews, 1903
- Perry, Yaron (2003). British Mission to the Jews in Nineteenth-Century Palestine. London: Routledge. ISBN 0-7146-8385-X
- Lewis, Donald M. The Origins of Christian Zionism: Lord Shaftesbury and Evangelical Support for a Jewish Homeland, Cambridge University Press, 2009. ISBN 978-0-521-51518-4
- Villani, Stefano, “Christianus Lazarus Lauria e l’attività della London Society for the Propagation of Christianity among the Jews in Italia,” Annali di Storia dell’Esegesi 34/1 (2017), pp. 199-228
