= St. George's Cathedral, Jerusalem =

Catherdral in Jerusalem

Coordinates: 31°47′16.81″N 35°13′43.33″E

St George's Cathedral
- Cathedral Church of St George the Martyr
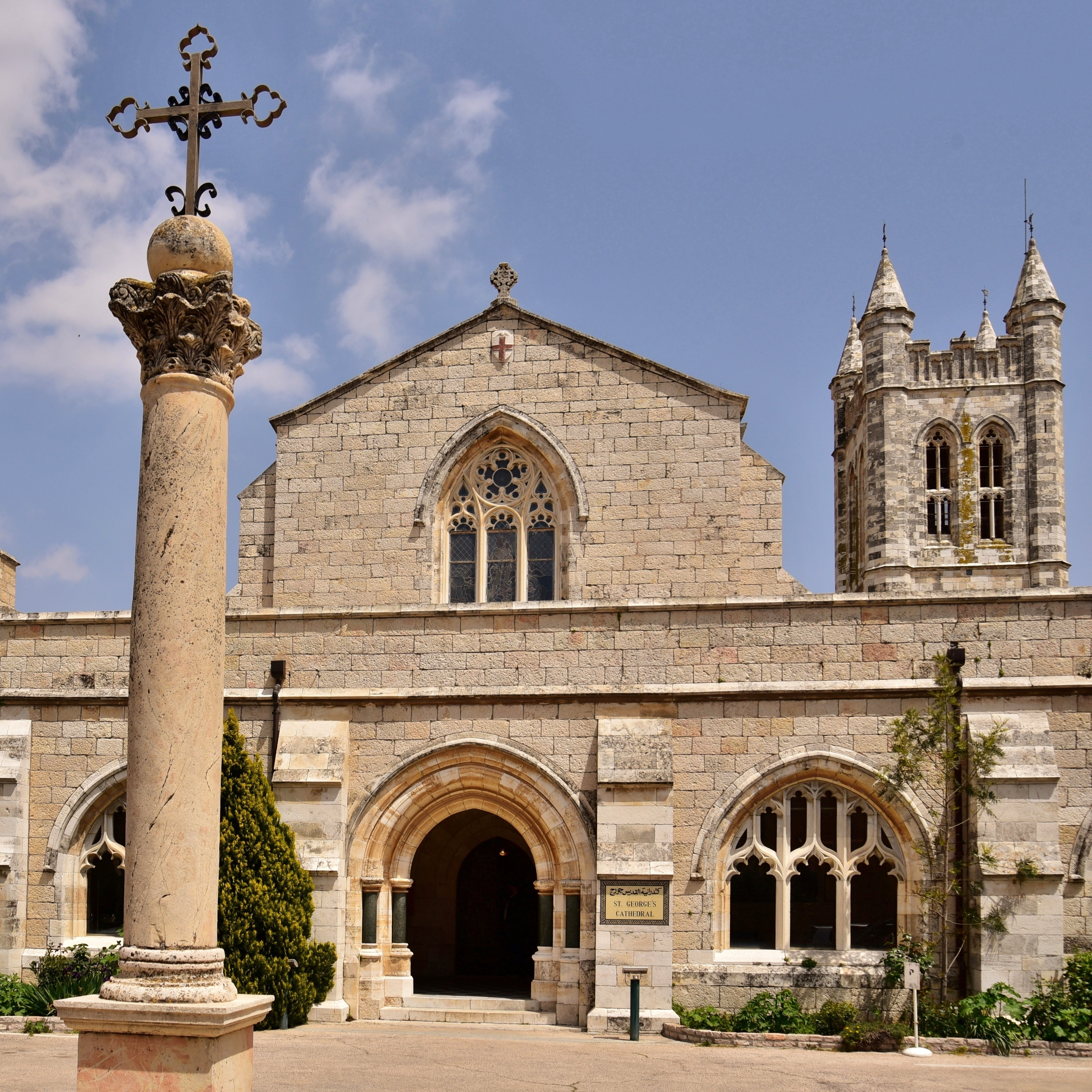
- St George's Cathedral
- Location: East Jerusalem
- Denomination: Anglican

Architecture
- Years built: Late 19th century

Administration
- Province: Episcopal Church in Jerusalem and the Middle East
- Diocese: Jerusalem

Clergy
- Archbishop: Hosam E. Naoum
- Dean: Hosam E. Naoum

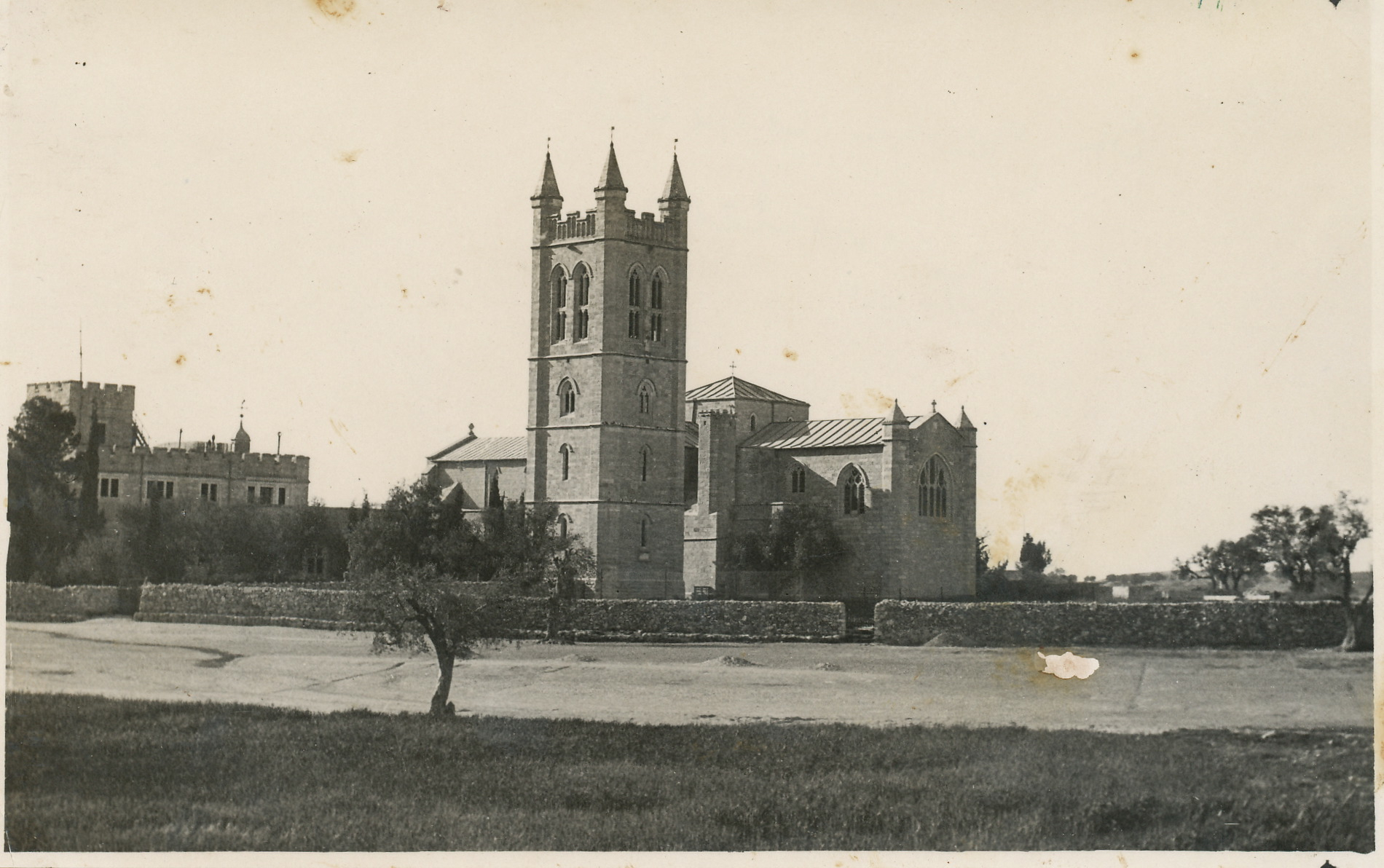
St George's Cathedral, 1930s

St. George's Cathedral is an Anglican (Episcopal) cathedral in Sheikh Jarrah, Jerusalem, established in 1899. It became the seat of the Bishop of Jerusalem of the Episcopal Church in Jerusalem and the Middle East, having taken the title from Christ Church, Jerusalem, built 50 years before.

It is located about two hundred meters (yards) away from the Garden Tomb, a popular site of Anglican and Protestant pilgrimage and devotion.

The church was built by the fourth bishop of the diocese, George Blyth. Most missionaries present in Palestine at the time were Evangelical Anglicans, but Blyth was from the Anglo-Catholic party of the Church of England. Finding that his use of St Paul's and Christ Church (both in Jerusalem) were limited, he resolved to found his own mission and build his own church. "He bought land in east Jerusalem where he built his cathedral and a missionary college, both called St. George's, making them the headquarters of a mission program independent of the two evangelical societies."

In order to fund the construction of the church, Blyth founded the Jerusalem and the East Mission.

Under Bishop Samuel Gobat, relations with the Eastern Orthodox Church had become strained. Blyth was eager to restore relations with the patriarch and as an Anglo-Catholic he had a great respect for the patriarch's office. Because of this he always called St George's a collegiate church rather than a cathedral, saying that the Church of the Holy Sepulchre was the one and only cathedral church of the city of Jerusalem. For this reason, St. George's contains a pool – a rarity in Anglican churches – which allows baptisms to be done through immersion, per Orthodox custom.

Herbert Danby became the librarian there in 1919 and was residentiary canon from 1921 to 1936. The Israeli whistleblower Mordechai Vanunu has been residing at the cathedral since his release from prison in 2004. St. George's College is located on the grounds and offers continuing theological education for clergy and laity from around the world.

== See also ==
- St George's Church (disambiguation)
- St. George's School, Jerusalem
- Christ Church, Nazareth
- J. E. Hanauer, former canon
- Naim Ateek, former canon
- Palestinian Christians
- Riah Hanna Abu El-Assal
- Sabeel
- Saint George: Devotions, traditions and prayers
- Christianity in Palestine
