= Samuel Gobat =

Swiss Anglican bishop (1799–1879)

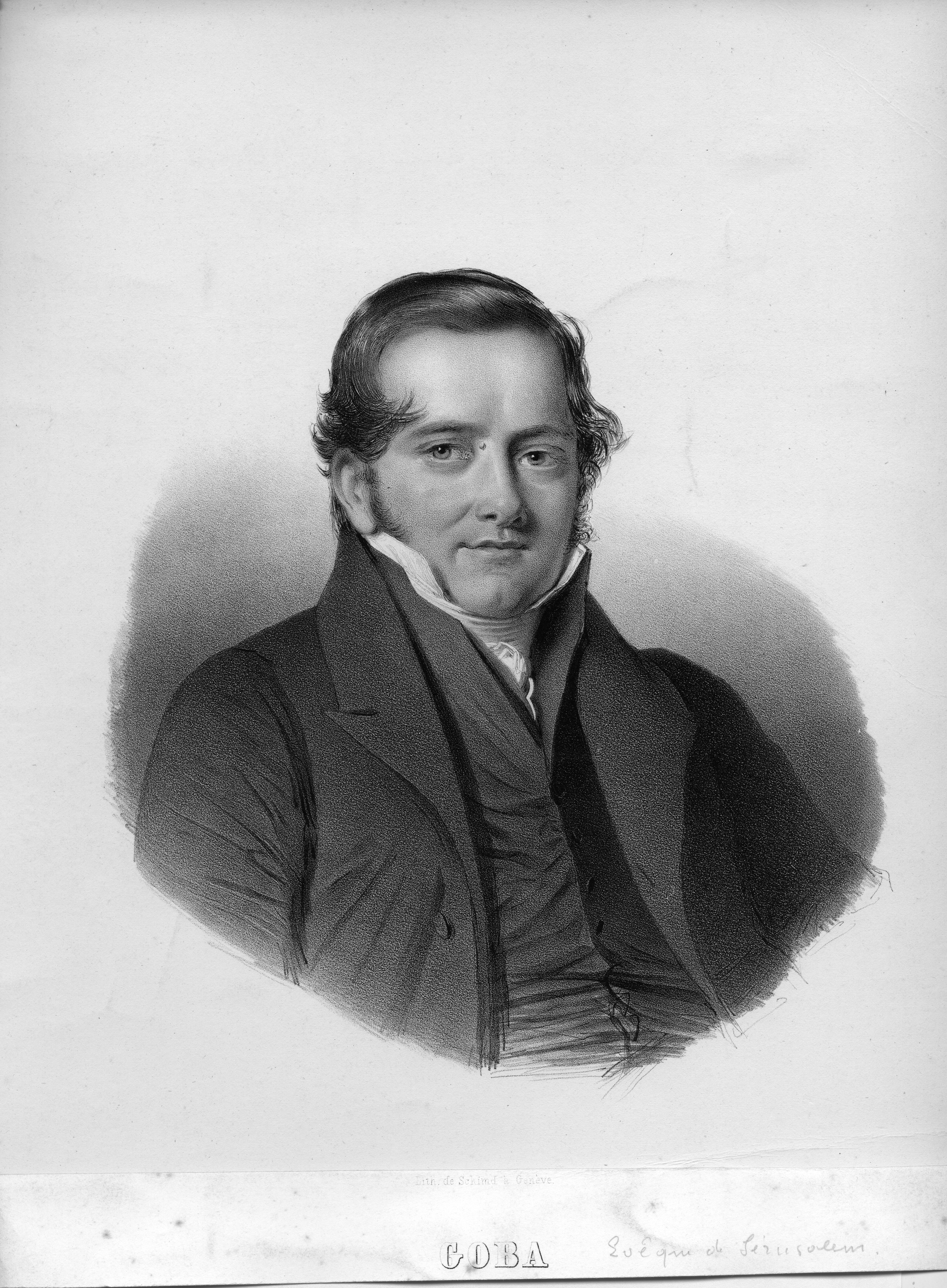
Gobat as a young man

Samuel Gobat (26 January 1799 – 11 May 1879) was a Swiss Calvinist who became an Anglican missionary in Africa and was the Protestant Bishop of Jerusalem from 1846 until his death.

== Biography ==
Samuel Gobat was born at Crémines, Canton of Bern, Switzerland, and baptised a member of the Reformed Churches of Bern-Solothurn. After serving in the Reformed St. Chrischona Pilgrim Mission at Bettingen from 1823 to 1826, he went to Paris and London, whence, having acquired some knowledge of Arabic and Ge'ez, he went out to Ethiopia under the auspices of the Anglican church with the Church Missionary Society.

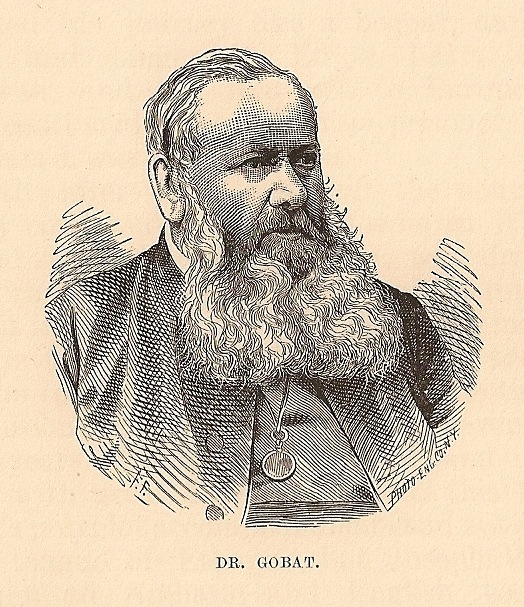
Samuel Gobat

In 1834 Gobat married Marie Christine Regine Zeller (1813–1879), daughter of Christian Heinrich Zeller (1779–1860), educator, pioneer of the inner mission and Pietist hymnologist. They had ten children, among them:

- Hanna Maria Sophie Gobat (1838–1922), married in 1859 Reverend John Zeller (1830–1902), missionary in Nazareth who later became the leader of the Gobat School in Jerusalem,
- Sophie Rosine Dorothea ("Dora") Gobat (1842–1923), a missionary of St. Chrischona Pilgrim Mission, married in 1867 Carl Heinrich Rappard (1837–1909), missionary in Alexandria for the Pilgrim Mission,
- Maria Sophie Elisabeth Gobat (1844–1917), married in 1869 the Swiss publisher Paul Kober, and
- Blandina Marianne Gobat (1850–1926), married Theodor Friedrich Wolters (1837–1910), pastor in Smyrna, missionary in Nazareth and Jerusalem.

His nephew was Charles Albert Gobat.

== Missionary career ==
He visited Ethiopia twice, the first time from the beginning of 1830 to the end of 1832; returning to Europe, he took his wife Maria May, 1834. He then returned in March 1835, but his own ill health (he writes that he was confined to his bed, "suffering cruel pains") forced him to return to Europe in 1836. His journal of his stay in Ethiopia (Séjour en Abyssinie) was published in 1834 at Geneva, and later translated into English as Journal of Three Years' Residence in Abyssinia. From 1839 to 1842 lived in Malta, where he supervised an Arabic translation of the Bible. During this time he was a missionary of the Church Mission Society.

== Episcopate in Jerusalem ==
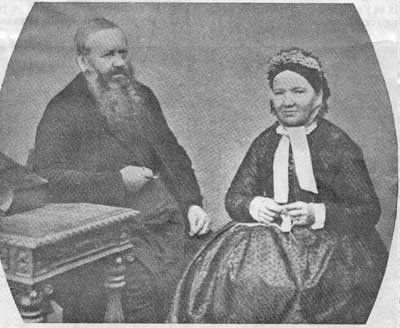
Samuel Gobat and Marie Gobat (née Zeller)

In 1846 he was consecrated second Protestant bishop of Jerusalem, under the agreement between the British and Prussian governments (1841) for the establishment of a joint bishopric for Anglicans, Lutherans and Calvinists in the Holy Land, carried by the Anglican Church of England and the united Evangelical Church in Prussia. Gobat succeeded the late Bishop Michael Solomon Alexander. He carried on a vigorous mission as bishop for over thirty years, his diocesan school (so-called Bishop Gobat School, established 1847, now the Jerusalem University College) and orphanage on Mount Zion being specially noteworthy.

Unlike his predecessor Bishop Alexander, who preferred missioning Jews and Muslims, however, with the latter being forbidden to convert and to be missioned by Ottoman law, Gobat had resorted to proselytising among Christians of other, mostly Orthodox denominations. The Porte had legalised this by a Firman in 1850 issued under the pressure of the Protestant powers of Britain and Prussia. Such proselytism had been criticised by proponents of the Anglican High Church faction.

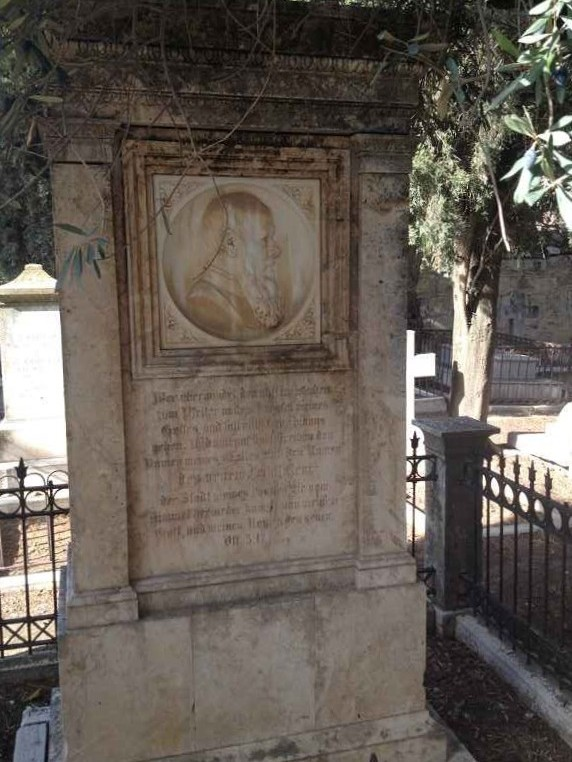
Grave of Gobat and his wife Marie, Mt. Zion Cemetery, Jerusalem

In order to support Gobat's effort Wilhelm Hoffmann (*1806-1873*), one of the royal Prussian court preachers at the Supreme Parish and Collegiate Church in Berlin, co-founded Jerusalem's Association, a charitable organisation on 2 December 1852, also becoming its first president. Gobat could found a number of charitable institutions with the help of funds raised by this Association. In the 1850s Gobat invited the Church Mission Society (CMS), of which he had previously been a missionary, to open Palestine as a field of mission, which they did.

In 1866 Gobat integrated the Jaffa Protestant mission of Peter Metzler, a missionary of St. Chrischona Pilgrim Mission, to Johannes Gruhler, the ordained Anglican pastor of Immanuel Church in Ramle. However, most Jaffa congregants disliked the Anglican Rite and preferred to attend Metzler's services. In 1871 he consecrated Christ Church, Nazareth, built under the supervision of John Zeller, a German CMS missionary. He also ordained the first Arab clergy of the diocese—Michael Ka'war and Seraphim Boutaji.

Gobat and his wife died in Jerusalem and are buried in Mount Zion Cemetery, there. A record of his life, largely autobiographical, was published at Basel in 1884, and an English translation at London in the same year. Gobat was succeeded by Bishop Joseph Barclay.

== See also ==
- Christianity in Israel

Anglican Communion titles
Preceded by Michael Alexander	Bishop of Jerusalem; 1846–1879	Succeeded by Joseph Barclay
