= Church Missionary Society in the Middle East and North Africa =

Church Missionary Society
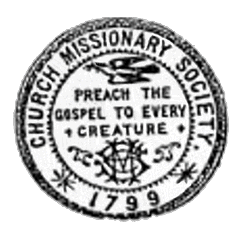
- CMS logo
- Abbreviation: CMS
- Formation: 12 April 1799
- Founder: Clapham Sect
- Type: Evangelical Anglicanism; Ecumenism; Protestant missionary British Commonwealth

The Church Missionary Society in the Middle East and North Africa, operated through branch organisations, such as the Mediterranean Mission (for countries bordering on the Mediterranean), with the mission extending to Palestine (Jerusalem, Gaza, Jaffa, Nazareth, Nablus and Transjordan), Iran (Persia), Iraq, Egypt, Ethiopia (Abyssinia) and the Sudan. The missions were financed by the CMS with the local organisation of a mission usually being under the oversight of the Bishop of the Anglican diocese in which the CMS mission operated. The CMS made an important contribution to the Episcopal Church in Jerusalem and the Middle East.

The Church Mission Society (CMS), was founded in Britain in 1799 under the name the Society for Missions to Africa and the East. In 1812, the organization was renamed the Church Missionary Society, and later the Church Mission Society.

== The Ottoman Empire (Turkey) ==
In 1815, William Jowett was appointed to commence the Mediterranean Mission, however the CMS was not able to establish missions in Ottoman Turkey in 1819-21 as the result of resistance to the Christian faith by the Turkish authorities. Following the Crimean War (1853-1856) the Sultan of Turkey was forced to issue a decree to secure religious liberty throughout the Ottoman Empire. The CMS sent two missionaries in 1862 to open a mission station in Constantinople. However, the continued opposition by the Turkish authorities to evangelism resulted in the failure of the mission, which closed in 1877.

== Egypt and Ethiopia (Abyssinia) ==
Five missionaries were sent to Egypt in 1825. The CMS concentrated the Mediterranean Mission on the Coptic Church and in 1830 to its daughter Ethiopian Church, which included the creation of a translation of the Bible in Amharic at the instigation of William Jowett, as well as the posting of two missionaries to Ethiopia (Abyssinia), Samuel Gobat (later the Anglican Bishop of Jerusalem) and Christian Kugler arrived in that country in 1827. Charles Isenberg (1806–64) joined the Abyssinian mission in 1835, followed by Johann Ludwig Krapf (1810–81) in 1837. The missionaries were expelled from Abyssinia in 1844. The Egyptian Mission was abandoned by the CMS in 1862.

The Egyptian Mission was revived in 1882 by the Revd Frederick Augustus Klein. The number of converts to the Anglican Church in Egypt was small because CMS decided not to proselytise among members of the Coptic or Evangelical churches, as the intention of the mission was the evangelisation of non-Christian people. In Cairo the CMS established schools for boys and girls. In 1899, Dr Frank Harpur established the Old Cairo Hospital. In 1905, Douglas M. Thornton and W. H. Temple Gairdner established a book depot in Cairo, which also published the Orient and Occident magazine in Arabic which published articles on religious and general subjects.

== The Ottoman Empire (Palestine) ==
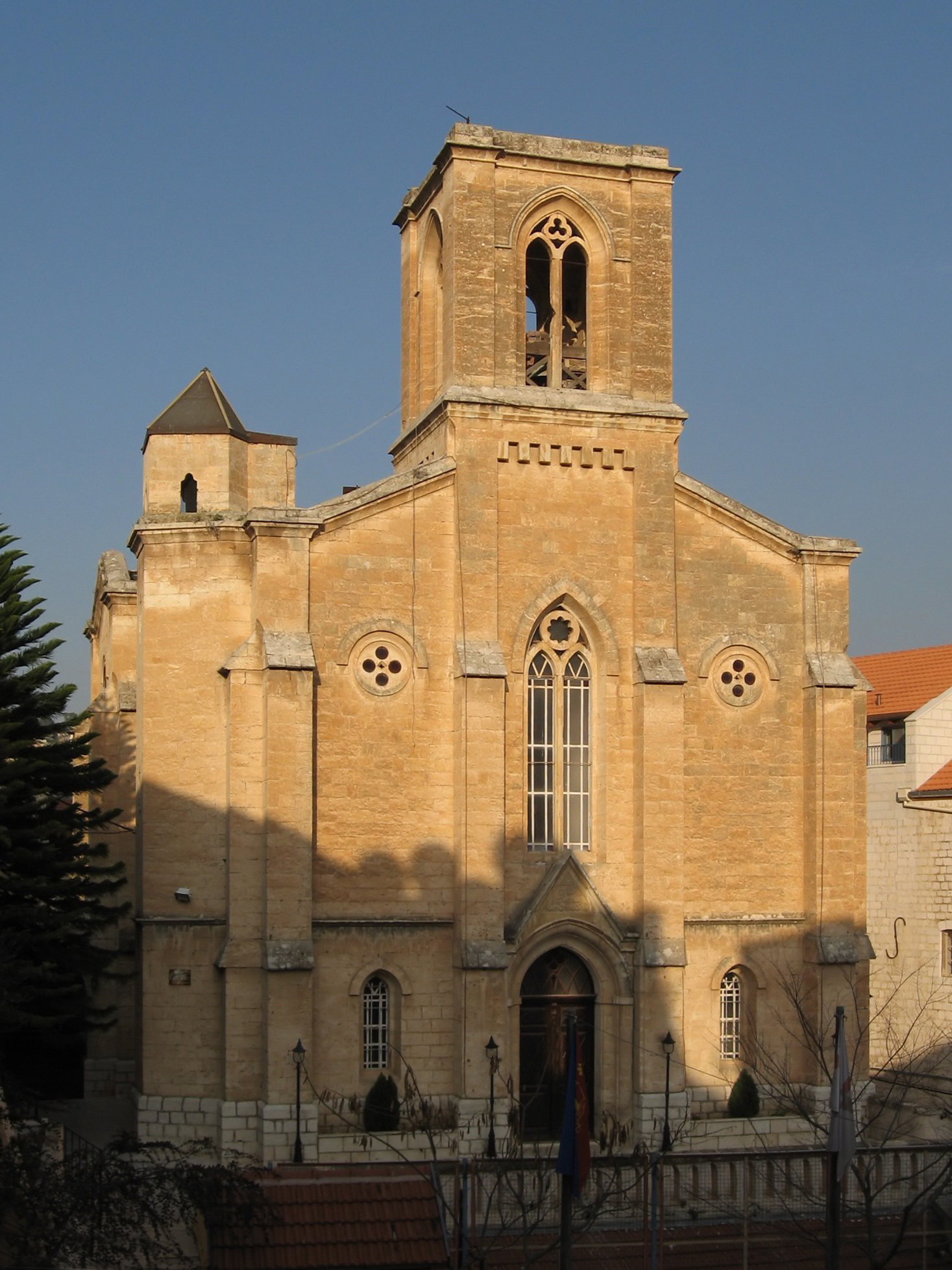
Christ Church in Nazareth, built 1871

The CMS sent missionaries to Palestine (Jerusalem, Gaza, Jaffa, Nazareth, Nablus and Transjordan), which was then part of the Ottoman Empire. The Revd Frederick Augustus Klein arrived in Nazareth in 1851 where he lived for 5–6 years, then he moved to Jerusalem until 1877. Klein discovered the Moabite Stone, and assisted with the translation of the Book of Common Prayer into Arabic.

Former CMS missionary Samuel Gobat became the second bishop of the Diocese of Jerusalem, and in 1855 invited the CMS to make Palestine a mission field. In 1855 the Revd John Zeller was sent to Nablus. In 1857 he moved to Nazareth, where he stayed for the next 20 years, then he moved to Jerusalem.

Over the years many missionaries were sent to Jerusalem, Gaza, Jaffa, Nazareth, Nablus and Transjordan, by 1899 there were 59 missionaries in Palestine. The missionaries included John Zeller, who exercised a great influence on the development of Nazareth and founded Christ Church, Nazareth, the first Protestant church in the Galilee, which was consecrated by Gobat in 1871.

The CMS established hospitals at Gaza, Jaffa, Nablus, Acre, Salt and Karak, and an orphanage at Nazareth. Edith Newton worked at the Jaffa Mission Hospital from 1887 to 1893 along with both of her sisters and fellow missionaries, Constance A. Newton and Frances Newton, who was in Palestine from 1889 until 1938.

The CMS established a school at Bethlehem, with Miss McNeile as principal; and the Jerusalem Girls' College, with Mabel Clarisse Warburton as the co-founder and first principal from 1919 to 1926. The CMS supported the Bishop Gobat School for boys (est. 1847). The CMS also established the Newman School of Missions, set up by the CMS missionary Eric Bishop, which was established for the study of languages and Islamic studies for missionaries.

In 1951 it was decided that the Jerusalem and East Mission would take over the work of the CMS in Israel.

== Iran (Persia) ==
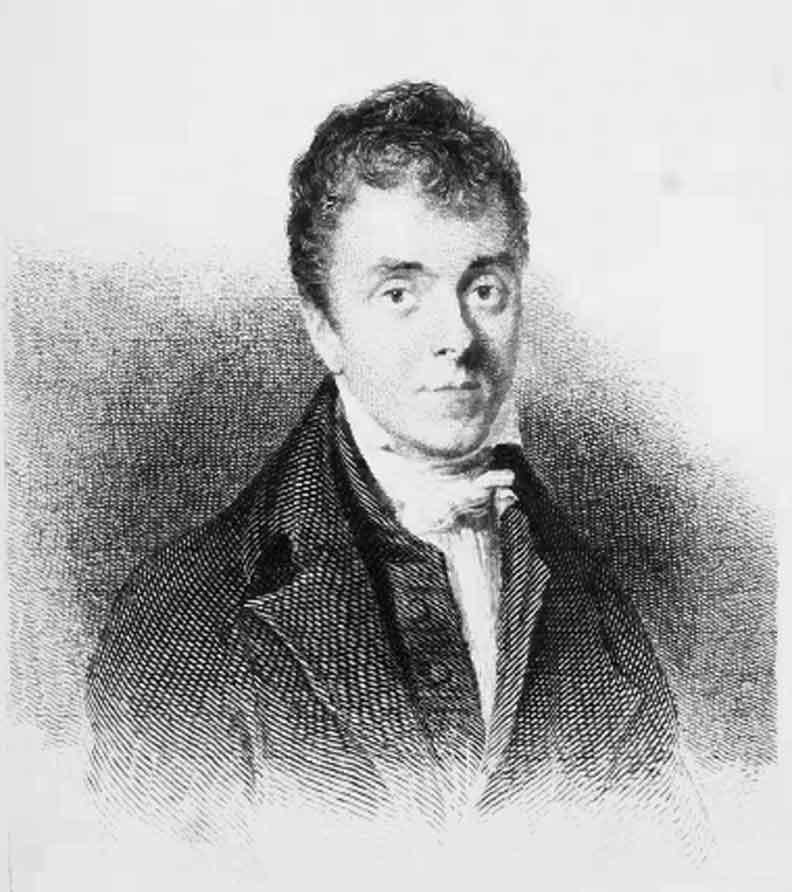
Henry Martyn, missionary to India and Persia

The Revd Henry Martyn visited Persia (Iran) in 1811. He reached Shiraz, then he travelled to Tabriz to attempt to present the Shah with his Persian translation of the New Testament. The British ambassador to the Shah, was unable to bring about a meeting, but did deliver the manuscript to the Shah. However a CMS mission was not established until 1869 when the Revd Robert Bruce established a mission station at Julfa in Ispahan.

The Persian mission operated hospitals and schools. In 1880 medical work was begun by Dr. E. F. Hoernle. The mission in Persia expanded to include Kerman, Yezd (1893) and Shiraz (1900), with Mary Bird, a medical missionary, establishing hospitals at Kerman and Yezd. Dr. Donald Carr expanded and built additional hospitals at the Isa Bin Maryam Hospital, in Julfa, Isfahan, Iran, and the Shiraz Christian Missionary Hospital.

After Bishop Edward Stuart resigned as the Bishop of Waiapu in New Zealand, he then served as a missionary in Julfa from 1894 to 1911. In 1940 government action forced the missionaries to end their activities.

== The Ottoman Empire (Iraq) ==
The CMS sent missionaries to the Ottoman Empire, to what is now Iraq. The CMS established a mission in Baghdad in 1883, with a hospital also established in Bagdad in 1896. The CMS also established a hospital in Mosul in 1901. Following the outbreak of the First World War the mission workers were interned by the Turkish authorities, then expelled to Egypt where they worked during the war years. In 1919 the CMS decided not to resume the mission.

== Sudan ==
=== North Sudan ===
Llewellyn Gwynne, Archibald Shaw and Dr Frank Harpur established mission stations in North Sudan at Omdurman (1899) and Khartoum (1900). A hospital was established at Omdurman. Later schools were established in Omdurman, Atbara (1908) and Wad Madani (1916). At the request of the government the CMS established schools in the Nuba Mountains at Salara (1935) and Katcha in (1939). In 1959 the government took over the operation of the schools.

=== South Sudan ===
The first station in South Sudan was established by Archibald Shaw in the land of the Dinka people at Malek, near Bor, South Sudan (1905), then later at Akot. The CSM also worked among the Nuer people at Ler and Zeraf Island, the Zande people at Yambio and Maridi and the Bari people at Juba, Yei, Loka and Kajo Keji (Kajokaji). The CMS operated elementary schools and the Nugent Secondary School, which was started at Juba in 1920, then in 1929 it was moved to Loka.

== CMS activities in the 20th Century ==
J. Spencer Trimingham served with the CMS in the Sudan, Egypt, and West Africa (1937–53).

Rachel Hassan worked for the CMS in Sudan from 1944 to 1971. She taught in the Nuba Mountains (1944-1959). She was at the Salara Mission (1945-1951); Katcha Mission (1951-1959); and was the CMS Secretary in Omdurman from 1963 to 1971.

== See also ==
- History of Christian missions
- Church Missionary Society in Africa
