= Colin S. Valentine =

Scottish missionary physician

Colin Strachan Valentine
- Born: 7 January 1834; Brechin, Scotland
- Died: 2 May 1905 (aged 71); Teignmouth, Devonshire
- Education: University of Edinburgh, LLD
- Occupation: Medical Missionary Principal of the Agra Medical Missionary Training Institution Court Physician (Jeypore)
- Spouse: Mary Somerville (1861-1863) Henrietta Smith Isabel Fraser (1869-1879) Janet Christie (1886-1902)

Colin Strachan Valentine FRSE LLD LRCP LRCSE (7 January 1834 - 2 May 1905) was a Scottish missionary physician who founded the first medical missionary training institution in India and advocated for the inclusion of women in the medical field. Valentine attended the University of Edinburgh and additionally was a student in the Edinburgh Medical Missionary Society. Valentine served in the Medical Mission House in Cowgate until the Foreign Mission Board of the United Presbyterian Church assigned him as medical missionary to India in 1861. In India, Valentine played an important role in improving the health and society of the regions of Mewar and Jeypore. He founded several educational institutions in Jeypore and instituted significant reforms and policies. After a brief return to Scotland, Valentine established the first medical missionary training institution in India called the Agra Medical Missionary Training Institution in 1881, which educated both male and female students.

== Early life ==
Colin Valentine was born on 7 January 1834 to James Valentine and Helen Strachan, handloom weavers in the Upper Tenements (now Montrose Street), Brechin, Scotland. Because of his parents’ economic circumstances, his maternal grandparents took him in as a child while his two brothers remained at home. He started weaving on the handloom at an early age, but his failing health forced his parents to focus instead on his education. Valentine was seven years old when his maternal grandfather died in 1841.

== Call to Missionary Work ==
Valentine's grandparents were exceedingly religious and read Christian stories to him in the evening. They often repeated hymns and quoted passages from scriptures. Valentine's youngest aunt had died in childhood, and his grandmother often spoke about her in a religious context. Thus, as a child, Valentine thought much about death and eagerly read books about heaven, his favorite being "The World to Come" by Isaac Watts. His companions often arranged stools to represent a pulpit behind which Valentine stood and sang and preached. These were his happiest moments, and Valentine often prayed to God to allow him to be a minister-missionary someday. After Valentine's grandfather died, his grandmother let a few boarders stay at their house, most notably politicians and great readers. Their conversations stimulated Valentine's eagerness to read and think for himself.

== Education ==
After his early schooling, Valentine was apprenticed to Mr. Blackhall, a chemist and druggist in Brechin. He then went to Falkirk to earn and save money for his college education. Due to illness, however, he was forced to spend his savings on his treatment. Valentine returned to Brechin, and began preaching and holding prayer meetings in a small vacant school under the Free Church. He also took photographs of people in the town. With preaching and photograph fees, he saved money to continue his education.

Valentine then enrolled in Edinburgh University for a career in the medical and foreign mission fields. While there, he became acquainted with Dr. Coldstream, Professor Miller, and other professors who were part of the Edinburgh Medical Missionary Society. He applied to be a student in the society and was accepted. Valentine then came to live with Dr. William Burns Thomson in the Medical Mission House in Cowgate as his assistant and served the medical mission there. Upon completion of his studies, Valentine was appointed by the United Presbyterian Mission Board as a medical missionary to India.

Valentine graduated from Edinburgh University, and in 1876 the Council of the University of Edinburgh granted him the distinguished honorary degree of LLD.

== Personal life ==
At Edinburgh University, Valentine met Dr. Somerville, who paid him to assist his son John Somerville in reading. He then married Dr. Somerville's daughter, Mary Somerville, on 8 October 1861. She caught "the cold" on their journey to Bombay, the first missionary station. She died on 23 February 1863 in a medical missionary's house in Bombay.

Valentine met Isabel Fraser in Dehradun in August 1868 while he was visiting mission schools in the area. She invited him to visit them in Mussourie. They began what was called a deep friendship and attended several parties together. They were engaged in November 1868 and married on 20 February 1869. The couple had four daughters.

Isabel Fraser died on 15 July 1879. Valentine married his third wife, Janet Christie, on 7 July 1886.

== Missionary Service ==
=== Work in Mewar ===
The United Presbyterian Church resolved to establish a mission in India in 1858, and chose Rajputana as its location. Dr. William Shoolbred was sent first, and other missionaries including Dr. John Robson were sent afterward. Valentine was appointed in 1861, and was first stationed in Beawar, Mewar. Upon his arrival and beginning his missionary medical work, the community received him and his fellow missionaries with suspicion. As he and Dr. Shoolbred visited the surrounding villages and prescribed medications, they were able to gain the trust of these communities through their success in treating patients. In addition to the surrounding villages, Valentine and the other missionaries visited Nusserabad, Ajmere, Pokhur, and the native state of Kiehneghur.

In 1862, Valentine, along with Shoolbred and Robson, wrote to the superintendent requesting permission to use a building that once was a dispensary in the city of Aya Nagar. The request was granted, and the missionaries set to open the building as a Medical Missionary Dispensary and museum. The superintendent posted notices around the city, which led to meetings held by Brahmans and Bunyas (merchants) that concluded in their decision to bar anyone from going to the dispensary. This was enforced with threats and the spreading of false reports, which succeeded in keeping patients away from the dispensary. When Valentine opened it on 23 June 1862, only one patient came. Soon after the opening, however, Cholera quickly spread throughout the city, and Valentine was summoned to treat a Bunya. When he successfully supported the Bunya through the infection, the city rejoiced, and patients then came to the dispensary to receive the mission's services.

Valentine continued to do work in various cities of Mewar. He also became involved in services other than his medical missionary work. In 1864, he became the civil surgeon to the station of Benares and medical officer to the Ajmere and the Mewar police corps. In 1866, he traveled through Mewar with the Deputy Commissioner and vaccinated children, prescribed medications, and performed surgeries. He also preached sermons and provided education services. He wrote a tract on smallpox in Marwari and on cholera in Marwari and Persian Urdu. Valentine also prompted the government to appoint two native vaccinators, and he and the vaccinators vaccinated more than seven thousand children.

With his interest in education in addition to medicine, Valentine examined the schools established by the government and found them to be in poor condition. He then planned and carried out a systematic examination of the schools and prepared a written report.

=== Work in Jeypore ===
By 1866, Valentine's health began to fail; he traveled to the Himalayas for rest. On his way, he passed Jeypore and visited its governor, Maharaja Ram Singh. The Maharaja requested Valentine to examine and treat his wife who was not cured by local traditional doctors. Valentine agreed and successfully treated the Maharani. In gratitude, the Maharaja asked Valentine to remain in Jeypore as his physician. In addition, the Maharaja gave him the colleges and educational institution, and offered a grant of 10,000 rupees for a library in the college and philosophical instruments. Valentine told him that he was a missionary, and that he would accept only if the Maharaja allowed him to carry on his missionary work and teach the doctrines of the Christian religion. Prior to this, the Jeypore state had not allowed any missionary to settle there. The Maharaja agreed and granted Valentine land to build a mission house. When it was erected, the Europeans were formed into a church in Jeypore.

While in Jeypore, Valentine remained close to the Maharaja, which permitted him to establish several institutions, including a School of Arts, a Public Library, a Philosophical Institute, a Museum, a Medical Hall, branch dispensaries, a board of health, and to enact prison reform. Here he founded the Mayo Hospital, a large medical and surgical hospital. He remained in Jeypore for nine years, serving as Court Physician and Director of Public Instruction. Valentine thus successfully brought the mission of the United Presbyterian Church of Scotland to the city.

In May 1875, Valentine's work in Jeypore was recognized by the Foreign Mission Board of the United Presbyterian Church. Rev. Professor John Cairns motioned to ordain Valentine, and his ordination was unanimously carried out.

After some time, the subject of Valentine's financial earnings were contested. He was receiving payment as medical attendant to the Maharaja while still serving the mission, which was seen as unrighteous. His connection with the United Presbyterian Mission was thus terminated, but he and his wife Isabel kept serving the community of Jeypore.

His health once more beginning to fail, Valentine returned to Scotland in 1875.

== Agra Medical Missionary Training Institution ==
=== Visions for the Institution ===
In 1862, at a missionary conference held at Lahore, Valentine first raised the suggestion of a medical missionary training institution in Agra. While in Jeypore on 29 December 1869, Valentine wrote to the directors of the Edinburgh Medical Missionary Society to appeal to them about his plans for the Agra Medical Missionary Training Institution. He mentioned that they had collected a good sum of money and that the trustees of the Presbyterian Church in Agra had given them the church and other buildings, along with some money. He planned for the church to become a residence hall for the students and a dispensary. Valentine asked the directors to send and support a medical missionary to manage the Institution, and argued that the community would be in favor of his plans, citing the support of the lieutenant governor Sir William Muir.

In the Allahabad Conference in 1872, Valentine stated his belief that female medical missionaries were able to relieve amounts of suffering that male medical missionaries were unable to relieve and give people access to the knowledge of the truth. In this conference, female doctors were discussed for the first time in a conference in India. Valentine proposed to allow women to take part in classes offered by the Agra Institution. He placed great emphasis on affording both men and women the opportunity for medical missionary training. The Missionary Conference approved of his plan and appointed several members to communicate with their respective societies about supporting Valentine's plan.

=== Implementation ===
When he returned to Scotland in 1875, Valentine began raising money for the Institution. In 1881 he traveled to Agra and opened the Agra Medical Missionary Training Institution, the first one in the country. Its objectives were to serve as a boarding house for native Christian medical students, to prepare for and/or supplement their education in the Government School of Medicine, to educate them about the Bible and in systematic theology, and to strengthen their public speaking skills by providing them with opportunities to preach to Christian and non-Christian audiences.

Valentine himself trained young medical students sent by numerous missionary societies. Through scientific and practical courses, he enriched their studies at the Government School of Medicine in Agra. He also trained them for missionary work through his systematic evangelical instruction.

A Calcutta newspaper called the Indian Witness reported on 27 October 1883 that women were currently attending the Agra Medical Missionary Training Institution through scholarships from the government. The institution itself proposed to provide scholarships for male and female students who wished to pursue medical training in Agra.

Valentine was obliged to return to Scotland in 1901, and was succeeded by a Scotch medical missionary, Dr. William Huntley.

== Death and legacy ==
Valentine died on 2 May 1905 at Teignmouth, Devonshire.

Valentine's emphasis on giving both men and women in India access to medical missionary education resulted in increases in female medical missionaries in India. One such example is that of a Hindu widow who was accepted into the Institution, graduated at the top of her class, and received a Lady Ripon Scholarship.

Graduates from the Institution went off to do medical missionary work in various places, including John Brand in Jodhpur, Saul David in Delhi, Henry Phillips in Agra, Newel Kishore in Nasirabad, Puran Lal in Ujjain, Ahmad Shah in Rutlam, Ghasa Singh in Bulandshahar, Thomas Solomon in Beluchistan, Henry Theophilus in Ajmere, and Samuel Masih in Neemuch.

In 1905, Valentine began an endowment of 1,000 rupees in the Foreign Mission Board of the United Presbyterian Church for scholarships to students.

Two female English medical missionaries, Dr. Edith Brown and Miss Greenfield, were influenced by Valentine's Agra Institution and founded the North India School of Medicine for Christian Women at Ludhiana in the Punjab in the autumn of 1894. Miss Greenfield had founded the first training school at Ludhiana, called Charlotte Hospital, in 1889 and the Memorial Hospital in 1898. In the North India School of Medicine for Christian Women, the teaching faculty was composed solely of four women medical missionaries and one nurse. The School was eventually affiliated with the Punjab University and was thus recognized by the state.
