= Medical missions =

Type of Christian mission

Medical missions is the term used for Christian missionary endeavors that involve the administration of medical treatment. As has been common among missionary efforts from the 18th to 20th centuries, medical missions often involve residents of the "Western world" traveling to locales within Africa, Asia, Eastern Europe, Latin America, or the Pacific Islands.

== Origins ==
=== China ===
The China Medical Missionary Journal; volume VIII, issue 1; 1894

In the 1830s an American missionary to China named Elijah Coleman Bridgman noticed that Western medicine was more effective at removing eye cataracts than Chinese medicine. At his request, the American Board of Commissioners for Foreign Missions sent Peter Parker to China in 1834 as the first Protestant medical missionary. Western medicine provided a means by which Parker could gain access to parts of Chinese society that were otherwise closed off to missionaries. More American doctors followed suit and, in 1838, founded the world's first society for medical missions: the Medical Missionary Society of China. In 1841 Parker visited Edinburgh, Scotland, and appealed to a number of the city's leading doctors. His presentation resulted in the establishment of the Edinburgh Medical Missionary Society which was the first medical mission society in Europe.

=== India ===
Under the British, India made use of medical missionaries for its public health initiatives, notably including the work by Ernest Muir and others to improve treatment and prevention of Hansen's disease (leprosy).

=== Africa ===
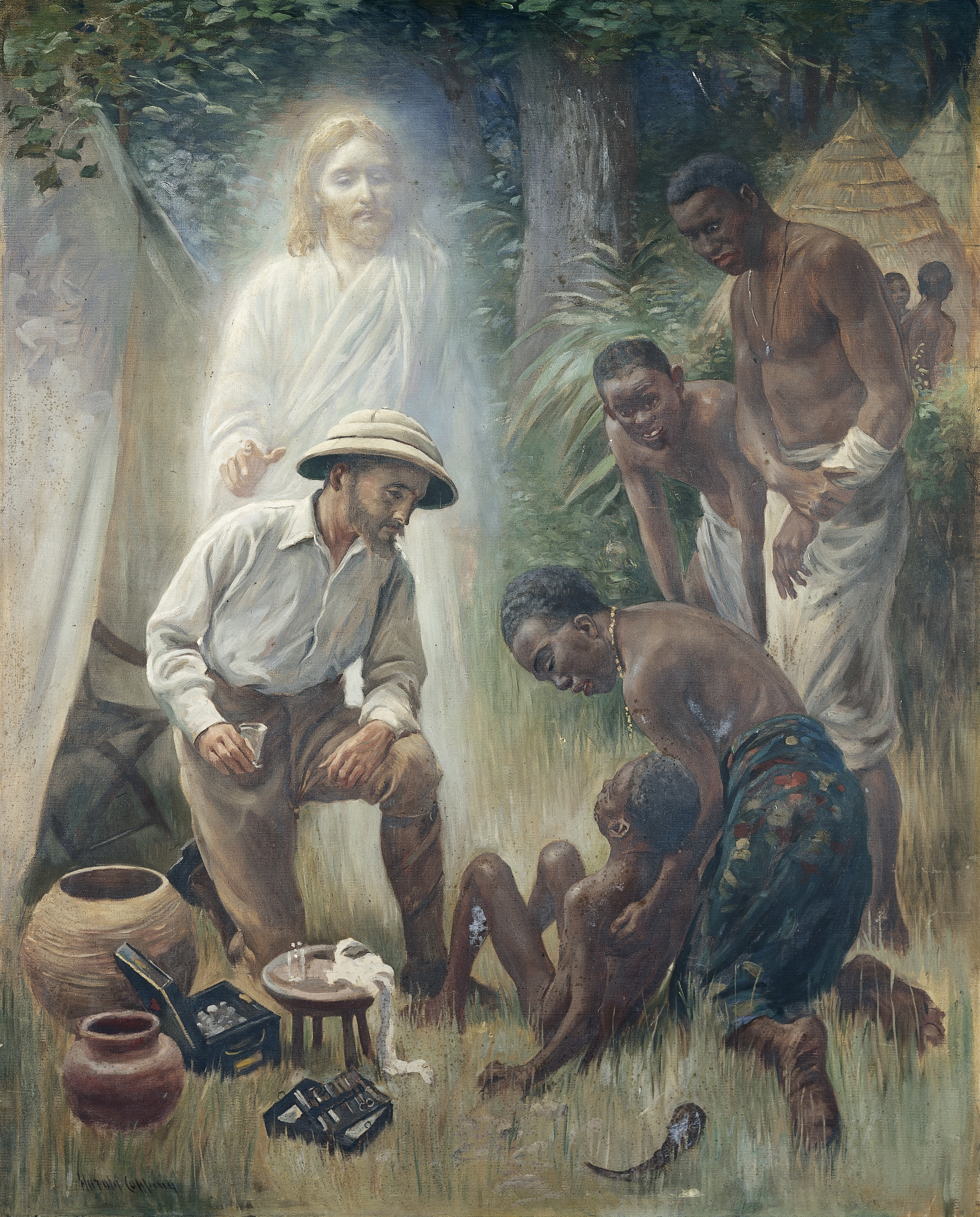
A medical missionary attending to a sick African; oil painting by Harold Copping, 1930

Another example of early medical missionary efforts is found in the work of David Livingstone, the prominent explorer and missionary. Livingstone worked as a medical doctor at the mission station in Kuruman, South Africa, beginning in 1841. Livingstone became known for his abilities as a healer, but eventually tired of medical work and doubted its effectiveness as a form of Christian ministry. He ceased to practice medicine and began his exploration of Africa's interior and fight against the slave trade, for which he is most commonly remembered. Despite Livingstone's limited practice as a medical missionary, he, like Parker, influenced medical doctors to pursue careers as missionaries. The Edinburgh Medical Missionary Society had a relationship with Livingstone from 1858 until his death in 1873.

=== 20th-century ===
By 1901, China was the most popular destination for medical missionaries. The 150 foreign physicians operated 128 hospitals and 245 dispensaries, treating 1.7 million patients. In 1894, male medical missionaries comprised 14 percent of all missionaries; women doctors were four percent. Already by 1923 China had half of the world's missionary hospital beds and half the world's missionary doctors. Of the 500 hospitals in China in 1931, 235 were run by Protestant missions and 10 by Catholic missions. The mission hospitals produce 61 percent of Western trained doctors, 32 percent nurses and 50 percent of medical schools.

== Legacy of the Edinburgh Medical Missionary Society ==
The Edinburgh Medical Missionary Society bore its name from 1843 until 2002 when it split into two separate charities: EMMS International and the Nazareth Trust.

=== EMMS International ===
Medical missions continue in many parts of the world today. EMMS International is a missions organization that traces its origins back to the Edinburgh Medical Missionary Society and credits David Livingstone as an inspiration to their ongoing efforts. According to the EMMS website: "Dr Livingstone continues to be an inspiration to EMMS International. We continue in the footsteps of Livingstone, and those like him, who sought to bring improvements in healthcare along with Christian compassion to some of the world's poorest communities." EMMS maintains missionary efforts in India, Malawi, Nepal, and parts of the United Kingdom.

=== The Nazareth Trust ===
The Nazareth Trust is the organization that runs EMMS Nazareth Hospital in Nazareth, Israel. In 1866 the Edinburgh Medical Missionary Society began supporting the work of Kaloost Vartan, who had founded a medical dispensary in 1861.

== Controversies in medical missions ==
=== Orientalism in medical missions ===
The historian David Hardiman identifies the lasting Orientalist impact of medical missionaries. "The image of the social and cultural malignancy of the 'Other' that was propagated and popularised by the missionaries continues to resonate in the West to this day." The perceived superiority of Western medicine by missionaries perpetuated stereotypes that Western societies were the "gold standard" of civilization. Rationalized understandings of illness and healing were considered more sophisticated and informed than those of non-Enlightenment oriented cultures. Therefore, it was the duty of "informed", "rational", "civilized" Westerners, to bring such values to the rest of the world.

=== Science vs. spirituality ===
For Western missionaries, the "Christianization" of a place often meant more than the conversion of its residents. Western, Modern ideologies were commonly imposed upon non-Western societies and the Christian message was conflated with Modern values. Among these values was a rationalized understanding of the cosmos, that seemingly necessitated skepticism about supernatural realities. Efforts to "modernize" or "civilize" went hand in hand with efforts to debunk what missionaries perceived as superstitious and mythological (i.e. irrational) understandings of health and healing.

=== Role of language in medical missions ===
Walima Kalusa writes about medical missions in colonial Mwinilunga, Zambia, and illustrates the difficulties that western missionaries had in achieving their goals of transforming the moral understanding of Africans. Kalusa highlights missionaries' dependence on the linguistic knowledge of Zambian medical auxiliaries as preventing such transformation.

According to Kalusa, "European practitioners of medicine envisaged that vernacular translations [of medical terms] would be drained of 'pagan' connotations and loaded with Western notions of medicine and disease." In the case of Mwinilunga, we see the western assumption that "universal truths" of sickness and disease would reveal themselves through the implementation of western means of healing. Such perspectives, however, dismiss the possibility of different understandings of illness and health. In Mwinilunga, local people attributed supernatural properties to Western medicine, much to the chagrin of missionaries to the area.

=== Social gospel vs. strict evangelism ===
Within Christian communities there has been some debate regarding the role of evangelism within medical missions. As seen in the example of David Livingstone, who questioned efficacy of medical practice as a means of evangelism, it was not uncommon to separate healthcare and proclamation of the gospel as distinct means of obeying the commands of Christ. Hardiman identifies that, "... missionaries in the field became more and more involved in social work, and they often saw this as their authentic life mission. In the process, preaching became secondary." As a result, missionaries commonly received criticism from fundamentalists for proclaiming a social gospel or a secular humanitarian agenda that undervalued the primacy of the conversion experience.

== See also ==
- Traditional medicine
- Voluntourism – short-term medical missions are a type of voluntourism
