= Kaloost Vartan =

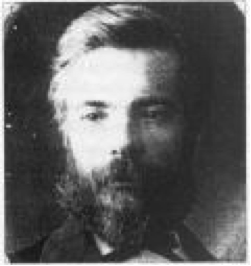
- Born: Pacradooni Kaloost Vartan; 1835; Constantinople, Ottoman Empire
- Died: 1908 (aged 72–73)
- Education: University of Edinburgh
- Spouse: Mary Anne Stewart
- Children: 10

Pacradooni Kaloost Vartan (1835–1908) was a physician and missionary. He founded the Nazareth Hospital, the first missionary hospital in Ottoman Galilee.

== Early life ==
Vartan was born in Constantinople, the son of a poor Armenian tailor, and attended the city's first American Presbyterian missionary school in Bebek. He joined the British army, serving in the Crimea as an interpreter, but after witnessing the dreadful inadequacies of battlefield medical facilities he resolved to become a surgeon.

After his initial Crimean experiences, Vartan traveled to Edinburgh where he trained as a doctor at Edinburgh under the auspices of the Edinburgh Medical Missionary Society (EMMS). He married Mary Anne Stewart, a Scottish nurse, and immediately after the wedding he and his bride left for Palestine.

== Mission in Palestine ==
Vartan's work was sponsored by the EMMS to whom he reported every quarter. With fundraising led by William Thomson, he was able to start the Nazareth Hospital.

When he arrived in Nazareth in 1861, and started working towards the establishment of the EMMS hospital. The first floor of the house he rented housed the dispensary, with a separate room for four beds. That was in the area of the Old Suuq today. The extended house eventually became inadequate and, after many difficulties, the land on which the present hospital stands was purchased in 1906.

Patients came from Nazareth and the surrounding countryside for medical care. In addition, hospital staff ran clinics in the villages neighboring Nazareth. When the Free Church of Scotland mission wanted advice about starting their own missionary work, they asked him.

== Personal life and death ==
Vartan and Stewart had ten children, five of whom lived to adulthood. The Vartan family were members of the Anglican Christ Church, Nazareth. John Zeller, the pastor of the church, assisted Vartan with his work in founding the Nazareth Hospital.

Vartan died in 1908. An iris ('Iris vartanii') was named by Sir Michael Foster after Dr. Vartan.
