= Runa Mackay =

Medical doctor and peace campaigner (1921–2020)

- Born: 30 July 1921; Kingston Upon Hull, England
- Died: 31 May 2020 (aged 98); Edinburgh Royal Infirmary, Edinburgh
- Education: University of Edinburgh
- Occupations: DCH, MD (1952)
- Years active: 1944-1984
- Medical career
- Profession: Doctor, surgeon
- Field: Obstetrics, Gynaecology, Paediatrics
- Institutions: EMMS Nazareth Hospital
- Awards: MAP Lifetime Achievement Award 2014

Runa Mackay (30 July 1921 - 31 May 2020) was a medical doctor and peace campaigner who dedicated much of her life to looking after the health of Palestinian people and victims of war and exile.

== Early life ==
Mackay was born in Kingston upon Hull, the daughter of Anna (née Train) and Duncan Matheson Mackay, an ophthalmologist. She went to secondary school at Esdaile College in Edinburgh. Following her father's footsteps, Mackay studied medicine at the University of Edinburgh, graduating in 1944 with an MB ChB. During World War II, she spent three summers working with the Women's Land Army in the Scottish Borders. She undertook further study, becoming a doctor in 1952, and a Member of the Royal College of Physicians of Edinburgh in 1954.

== Career ==
Her first job was as a house physician and surgeon at Edinburgh's Royal Hospital for Sick Children. She became an assistant general practitioner in Chesterfield. and worked at the Livingstone Dispensary in Edinburgh's Cowgate which was run by the Edinburgh Medical Missionary Society (EMMS).

After her graduation in 1952 Mackay worked briefly as a registrar in the Children's Hospital in Manchester, before she took a position as a locum paediatrician at the EMMS Nazareth Hospital in Israel, in 1954. In spite of this role initially having a proposed duration of six months, Mackay stayed in Nazareth for 30 years, working as an obstetrician, gynaecologist and paediatrician. Her career in Israel was interrupted by a return to Edinburgh in 1957 to undertake further training in obstetrics, and a year's sabbatical in 1976, during which Mackay worked in India. On returning to Israel, Mackay accepted a position as a District Medical Officer with the Israeli Ministry of Health, where she would stay for the next ten years, focusing primarily on improving conditions for Palestinians living in areas near Nazareth.

She was a founding member of the Galilee Society, the National Arab Society for Health, Research and Services, a community support organisation for Palestinian people in the region of Galilee.

She retired in 1984 and by 1985 had moved back to Edinburgh. Between 1985 and 1990 Mackay returned to study at the University of Edinburgh, graduating with an honours degree in Arabic and Islamic Studies. She started to work for Medical Aid for Palestinians (MAP) in 1987, working in refugee camps in Lebanon, mainly Qasmiyeh camp, and a small hospital for children in Hebron that she visited in 1991 at MAP's invitation. Mackay became a trustee of MAP, and visited Lebanon and the Occupied Palestinian Territory, and opened a MAP in Scotland which ran annual fundraising events. In 2014, Mackay was awarded the MAP lifetime achievement award in recognition of her years of service to the Palestinian people.

=== Activism ===
Mackay was a member of the women's anti-war organisation Women in Black, and was recognised for this in Scottish Parliament. She was also a member of Campaign for Nuclear Disarmament and the Medical Campaign against Nuclear Warfare and MedAct.

In 1985, she was the Scottish delegate to an International Fellowship of Reconciliation to the Middle East. The same year, she was appointed secretary for the UN International Year of Peace Scottish Council.

== Published works ==
- Exile in Israel: A Personal Journey with the Palestinians (1995)
