= Frederick Klein =

Frederick Augustus Klein (1827–1903), or F. A. Klein as he is called in much of the literature, was a Church Missionary Society (CMS) missionary in the Middle East. He is remembered for his 1868 discovery of the Moabite Stone, which dates from about 840 B.C. It gives qualified confirmation of some events mentioned in the biblical Book of Kings.

== Early life ==
Klein was born in Strasbourg, France, in 1827. He later studied at the Basel Mission Institute and then attended the Church Missionary Society College, Islington. He later received Anglican holy orders.

== Missionary career ==
He left for Ottoman Palestine under the CMS in 1851. His wife died in Nazareth on October 10, 1851. He ministered in Nazareth until 1855 and then in Jerusalem for some 22 years; and also travelled into Jordan. During his time in Palestine he worked with John Zeller and Samuel Gobat, among others. While in the Galilee he served at Christ Church, Nazareth. He left for Germany around 1877 and engaged in Arabic translation.

He labored in Cairo from 1882 to 1893, where the CMS had reopened work, wishing to evangelize among Muslims. He established public worship in Arabic. Upon returning to Europe for good his translation work continued, and he revised the Arabic version of the Book of Common Prayer.

Klein also write a book titled The Religion of Islam which was republished in 2012.

== Legacy ==
He is most remembered for discovering the Moabite Stone. However, he was also one of numerous long-lived German missionaries who acquired great proficiency in Arabic. Anticipating later developments in evangelical missions, he was also intent on sharing the Christian faith with Muslims.
