= Lewis Yelland Andrews =

British Mandate commissioner of Galilee

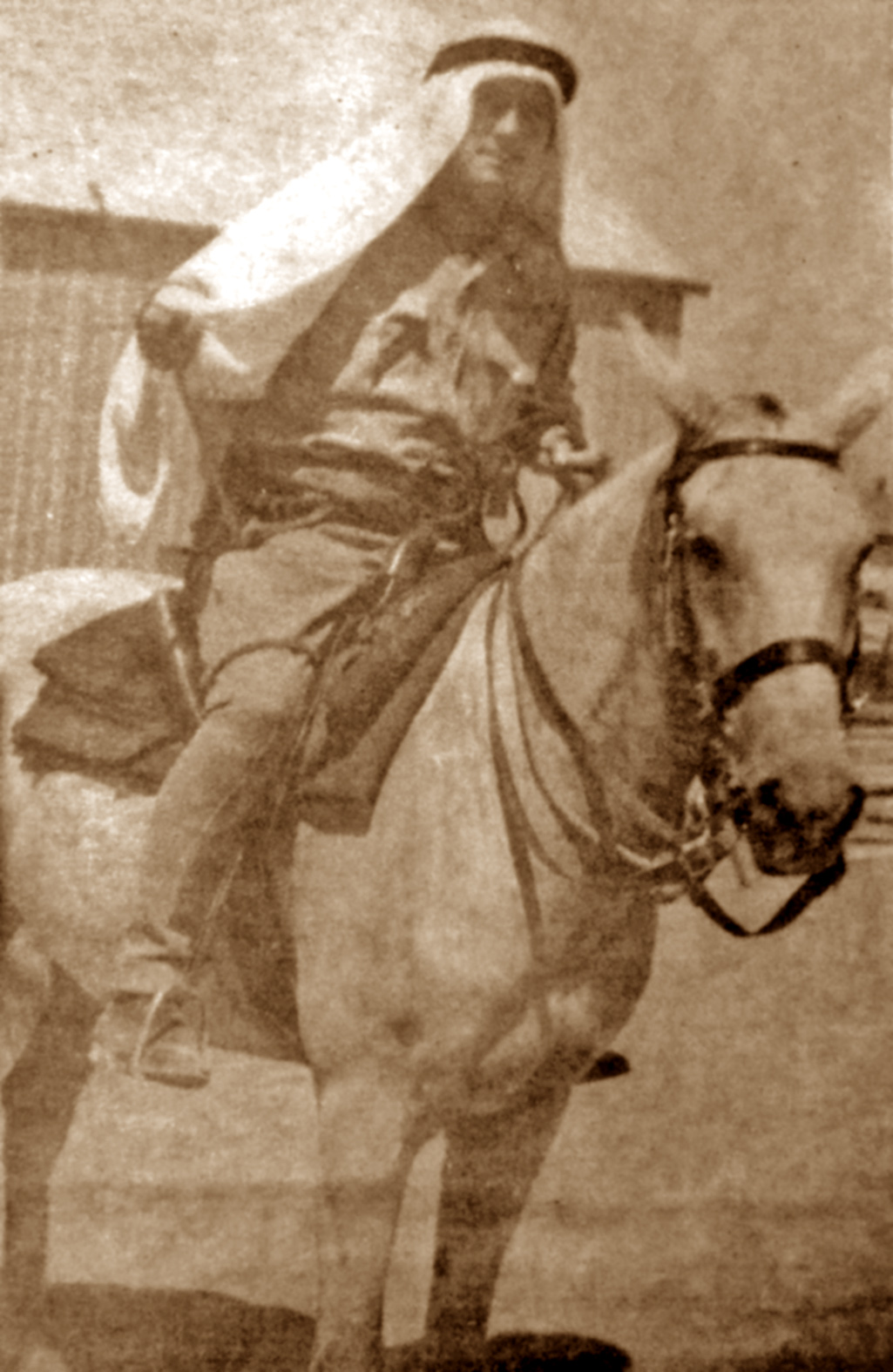
Lewis Yelland Andrews in the 1930s

Lewis Yelland Andrews (26 September 1896 – 26 September 1937) was an Australian soldier and colonial official who served as the acting District Commissioner for the region of Galilee during the British Mandate over Palestine. He was assassinated by Arab militants on his way to prayer services at Anglican Christ Church in Nazareth on 26 September 1937.

== Biography ==
Lewis Yelland Andrews was a son of A.E. Andrews from Sydney, Australia. Andrews enlisted in the Egyptian Expeditionary Force in World War I and served as a private at Gallipoli in the Australian Light Horse. He later joined the Camel Transport Corps in Egypt and Palestine. By war's end he had risen to the rank of captain and worked for the administration of Mandatory Palestine almost from its inception. He learnt both Arabic and Hebrew, and served as a district, then an assistant district, officer from 1920 to 1932. For the next five years he worked as a development officer (1932-1937) He was appointed liaison officer to the Peel Commission that year and became acting District Commissioner for the Galilee region in 1937. His assassination on 26 September 1937 led the British government to respond by outlawing the Arab Higher Committee and ordering the arrest of its members. His assassination was considered to represent a key point in the later phase of the Arab Revolt.

Andrews was the object of particular hatred among Arabs in the Galilee area for the repressive manner in which he carried out government measures after the outbreak of the general strike of 1936, and for his support for Zionist settlements in the Galilee where he actively assisted Yishuv efforts to purchase land in the Hula Valley. He openly advised Jews to form their own defense units. Before his murder, one of Andrews' last tasks was to organise a program for the Royal Commission. He allegedly used his influence in favour of partitioning the Palestine Mandate. He was involved in organizing the British Royal Commission, where he threw his weight behind the proposal for partitioning Palestine into Jewish and Arab areas, a proposal bitterly resented by the Arabs, who regarded him as their strongest enemy.

=== Assassination ===
On 26 September 1937, Andrews, Harry Pirie-Gordon (the assistant District Commissioner) (Note: Pirie-Gordon had been a WW1 British intelligence officer, and functionary in the Arab Bureau (Gill 2006, pp. 1045–1059; Westrate 2010, pp. 111, 143–144).) and Andrews' bodyguard, constable Peter McEwan, arriving to attend service at the Anglican Christ Church in Nazareth were intercepted by four masked militant followers of Izz ad-Din al-Qassam who ambushed them. Andrews, who happened to be celebrating his 41st birthday that day, died on the spot and his bodyguard later died at the hospital. Pirie-Gordon was not hit.

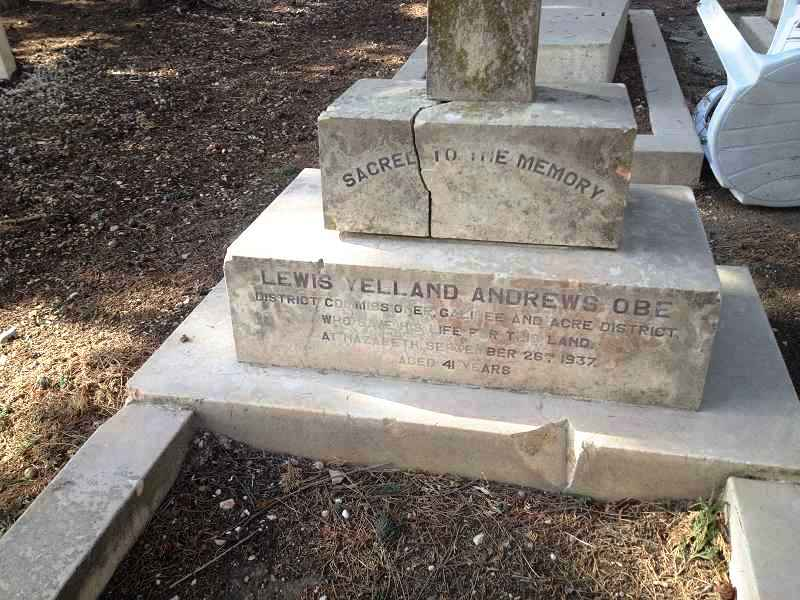
Grave of Lewis Yelland Andrews in the Mount Zion Cemetery, Jerusalem

Shortly after the murder, an Australian friend from their days together in the Light Horse regiment staggered around in drunken distress and shot every Arab that came into his sights with a pair of revolvers. The incident was hushed up and the friend quietly repatriated to Australia. Hundreds of suspects of terrorism were rounded up and given "gentlemanly persuasion", which consisted of Black and Tans, Turkish and "third degree" methods violent enough to be called torture. Some, including women, suffered sexual violence and rape.

The Arab Higher Committee (AHC) was quickly declared illegal and Amin al-Husayni was removed from his post as president of the Supreme Muslim Council. The day after Jamal al-Husayni and five other members of the AHC, whom the British authorities held responsible for the recent Arab violence, were served with restrictive orders. Jamal slipped away to Syria while al-Husayni, also fearing arrest, slipped out under cover of dark from the Haram al-Sharif and eventually made his way to Lebanon.

A reward of 10,000 Palestine pounds was offered for information leading to the arrest of the killers.

Both David Ben-Gurion and Dov Hoz, a founding leader of the Haganah, considered Andrews a personal friend and ally. On his death, he was eulogized by Yitzhak Ben-Zvi, who became a future President of Israel. Andrews was buried in Jerusalem where his grave is preserved in the Protestant Mount Zion Cemetery in Jerusalem. He left a widow, Maude Elizabeth (née Kirkham), and three children: Tony, Diane and Georgina Mary.

There are streets named for him in Tel Aviv and Netanya (where he played a role in clearing the area of malaria).

== Sources ==
- Gelber, Sylva M. (1989). No Balm in Gilead: A Personal Retrospective of Mandate Days in Palestine. McGill-Queen's Press. ISBN 978-0-886-29104-4.
- Gill, David W.J. (December 2006). "Harry Pirie-Gordon: Historical research, journalism and intelligence gathering in the Eastern Mediterranean (1908–18)". Intelligence and National Security. 21 (6): 1045–1059. doi:10.1080/02684520601046382. S2CID 145245021. Archived from the original on 12 October 2022.
- Hoffman, Bruce (2015). Anonymous Soldiers: The Struggle for Israel, 1917-1947. Knopf Doubleday. ISBN 978-1-101-87466-0.
- Hughes, Matthew (2019). Britain's Pacification of Palestine: The British Army, the Colonial State, and the Arab Revolt, 1936–1939. Cambridge University Press. ISBN 978-1-107-10320-7.
- Laurens, Henry (2002). La Question de Palestine: Une Mission sacrée de la civilisation. Vol. 2. Fayard. ISBN 978-2-213-61251-5.
- Sicker, Martin (2000). Pangs of the Messiah: The Troubled Birth of the Jewish State. Praeger Publishers. ISBN 978-0-275-96638-6.
- Silver, M. M. (2022). The History of Galilee, 1538–1949: Mysticism, Modernization, and War. Rowman & Littlefield. ISBN 978-1-793-64943-0.
- Tarszisz, Roz (8 March 2015). "From ANZAC Private to District Commissioner of the Galilee". J-wire.
- The Palestine Police (29 September 1937). "Murder". The Palestine Post. p. 1.
- Westrate, Bruce C. (2010). Arab Bureau: British Policy in the Middle East, 1916-1920. Penn State Press. ISBN 978-0-271-04009-7.
