= William Burns Thomson =

Scottish medical missionary

- Born: 1821; Kirriemuir, Scotland
- Died: April 29, 1893 (aged 71–72)
- Occupation: Medical missionary

William Burns Thomson (1821 – April 29, 1893) was a Scottish medical missionary born in Kirriemuir, Scotland to Christian parents. Thomson dedicated his life to the spread of the gospel and to medical missionary work. His work as part of the Edinburgh Medical Missionary Society(EMMS) transformed the organization from its focus on the slums of Scotland to an international missionary aid organization. During his time with EMMS, Dr. Thomson advocated for missionaries across the globe, including Dr. Kaloost Vartan of the Nazareth Hospital and Dr. William Jackson Elmslie in Kashmir. Dr. Thomson also served as a pioneer for medical missionary training by creating the original EMMS training school at the Cowgate dispensary. This led to more training schools being created in other parts of the world, like Bombay(now known as Mumbai) and Calcutta(now known as Kolkata), India.

== Early life ==
Dr. Thomson was born in 1821 in Kirriemuir, Forfarshire in Scotland. His father was a merchant who died when Thomson was young, and his mother died soon after. As a result, Thomson was sent to live with his older brother, a headmaster at Golspie in Sutherlandshire.

At the age of 17, Thomson and a friend decided to dedicate their lives to the church by joining the ministry and they began Sabbath- school teaching. His class grew from that of 3 students to a Sunday school of 200 students. At age 20, William's brother left him in charge of Golspie and during his time leading this school, he is said to have influenced a student to join the ministry. After his time at Golspie, Thomson served as an evangelist in the Lowlands. A minister was once quoted saying that Thomson's sole goal in life was to convert people to Christianity.

== Education ==
In 1847, Thomson traveled to Edinburgh where he planned to begin his collegiate studies. In order to support himself, Thomson worked as a private teacher but his first experiences were said to have been bad and he had little success finding a teaching job. Despite this, he continued his collegiate studies and worked as an assistant chaplain at the Calton jail for four years.

At the end of his Arts course, Thomson was planning on going to theological college and to go abroad to China as a missionary. These plans changed after his encounter with an Irishwoman living in the lower districts of Edinburgh. When he approached the woman, she was hostile towards him until she realized that he might be a doctor. Thomson offered the Irishwoman basic medicine in the form of castor oil which improved her health. This made Thomson realize how medicine could be an asset in his work. This prompted him to change his plans of going abroad as a religious missionary and instead pursue medicine as his course of theology. After he completed his medical training, Thomson joined the Edinburgh Medical Missionary Society (EMMS).

== Edinburgh Medical Missionary Society ==
Thomson was first introduced to the Edinburgh Medical Missionary Society in 1854 through an essay competition. Dr. Thomson submitted an essay that didn't end up winning but was highly praised by one of the judges, Rev. Dr. Guthrie. Dr. Guthrie and other members of the society pushed Thomson to publish his essay which he did. In this essay, Thomson detailed the role the Church should play in the lives of the poor at the time.

Following this first encounter with EMMS, Dr. Thomson was asked to take a superintendent position at the 39 Cowgate dispensary. This dispensary was first established by Dr. Peter David Handyside and it was Dr. Handyside and a colleague that convinced Dr. Thomson to take over that dispensary. During his time as the superintendent of the dispensary, Dr. Thomson created a training institution out of the dispensary. The Medical Missionary Society at the time gave an annual grant so that their current medical students would have access to the dispensary. These students were unreliable which prompted Dr. Thomson to urge the Society for more money to fund a training school. After securing funds from a friend, Dr. Thomson set up the Medical Mission Dispensary and Training Institution. Through this, he and his successors, John Lowe and Sargood Fry, were able to train at least 200 medical missionaries for the Protestant Church.

In 1870, after working at 39 Cowgate and with EMMS for 11 years, Dr. Thomson felt that he needed to step away from the society. In an article published after Dr. Thomson's death, the editor of Medical Missions at Home and Abroad, writes his theory on why Dr. Thomson resigned. According to the editor, a dispute between Thomson and the directors of EMMS over whether or not a student was qualified to be a medical missionary led to Dr. Thomson losing the respect of his students and his authority as their instructor. This then prompted his resignation and departure from the Society.

== Life after EMMS ==
A year after leaving 39 Cowgate and the Edinburgh Medical Missionary Society, Dr. Thomson wrote that throughout the months he was away from the dispensary he was able to connect more with god. In addition to reconnecting with his religious beliefs, Dr. Thomson began missionary work in The Canongate and set up a hospital there.

After some time, and after much insistence from his loved ones, Dr. Thomson and his wife departed from Edinburgh and went to France. While he was there, Dr. Thomson and his wife were invited to a meeting for the Bible Society's Rooms, and Thomson's loved ones spoke about the admiration they had for him and gifted him and his wife with €1000. After this, he remained in the Riviera for two years and was invited to stay in Mildmay where he lived out his last years of life by conducting evangelistic services and having morning worship with the deaconess. In September 1892, Dr. Thomson traveled to Bournemouth, where he ultimately died on April 29, 1893.

Dr. Thomson and his relatives were buried in the cemetery at Bournemouth.

== Advocacy and Aid ==
Throughout his life, Dr. Thomson was in constant communication with other missionaries across the globe.

- Dr Kaloost Vartan: Dr. Vartan, founder of the EMMS Nazareth Hospital, was in need of funds to sustain his work and reached out to Dr. Thomson. With his help, Dr. Vartan was able to continue his work in Nazareth with money Thomson fundraised on his behalf. This money supported Dr. Vartan for two years until the Edinburgh Medical Missionary Society (EMMS) was able to fund his stay in Nazareth. On October 21, 1865, a meeting of the Directors of the Society took place which led to the Society “adopting” Vartan as an agent in Nazareth.
- Dr. William Jackson Elmslie: In his memoir, a letter was included in which he thanked Dr. Thomson for helping the Kashmir Medical Mission be featured in the Medical Missionary Journal which brought attention to this mission. In the feature of the Kashmir (in the periodical referred to as Cashmere) Medical Mission, the authors of the Church Missionary Society periodicals shared excerpts from Dr. Elmslie's letters and communications with other missionaries. In these letters, Dr. Elmslie recounts his experiences in Kashmir and the struggles he and Rev. Handcock underwent as a result of the authority figures in Kashmir. These letters served as a direct form of communication between Dr. Elmslie and the members of the Society.
- Dr. Andrew Davidson: In 1862, Dr. Davidson began medical missionary work in Madagascar that was carried on until the colonization of Madagascar by France. Dr. William Burns Thomson, with the help of Dr. Theodore Maxwell, was able to send Dr. Davidson teaching supplies that aided his work in Madagascar. These supplies allowed Dr. Davidson to teach chemistry to the twenty students he had in his Medical Mission College. Dr. Thomson also served as a spokesperson for Davidson at the London Missionary Society by asking for another missionary and nurse for Dr. Davidson. Ultimately, the London Missionary Society allowed Thomson and Davidson to make the ultimate decisions of the work that took place at the mission station in Madagascar which allowed them to teach natives chemistry and midwifery. Over time, Dr. Davidson gained the trust of the queen of Madagascar at the time and went on to build a hospital, dispensary, and the Malagasy Medical Mission College. Through this college, Dr. Davidson trained natives on what they needed to know to be a medical missionary so that they could take mission trips to other parts of the island such as Fianarantosoa.
- Dr. Kenneth Macqueen: In 1863, Dr. Macqueen penned a letter, that was published in the Society's Report, in which he pleaded the Society to fund a similar dispensary to Cowgate's. The directors didn't want to fund Dr. Macqueen's dispensaries, but Dr. Thomson was able to find a donor who wanted to give to their cause. After receiving a letter from Dr. Thomson, the donor sent a letter to Dr. Macqueen offering 2000 pounds, £1000 for the Bombay Institute and £1000 for the Calcutta Institute in India. The terms for this donation were to raise donations amounting approximately 1000 euros, which they accomplished, thus funding the Bombay and Calcutta medical mission dispensaries.

== Legacy ==
On multiple occasions, in his autobiography and in his address at the Mildmay Park Conference in London in 1869, he mentions how his work as a doctor served as an asset to his religious mission. He describes how he would preach to his patients while also treating them and how these patients would then return to continue hearing about Thomson's god. He describes how being a doctor allowed him to reach people from different places that he otherwise may not have reached and how his title as a doctor allowed him to be more well-received by the people he was trying to reach.

Thomson's devotion to the causes of EMMS are said to have been admirable by his peers. According to a 1915 periodical, Dr. Thomson's effort to train more missionaries allowed EMMS to grow in Scotland and expand its missionary work with direct impact on the existing services of EMMS today.
