= Karimeh Abbud =

Palestinian photographer (1896–1940)

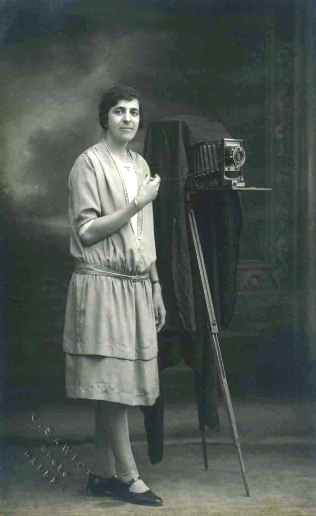
- Born: 18 November 1893; Bethlehem, Mutasarrifate of Jerusalem, Palestine, Ottoman Empire
- Died: 27 April 1940 (aged 46); Bethlehem, Mandatory Palestine
- Education: American University of Beirut, Greater Lebanon
- Occupation: Photographer

Karimeh Abbud or Karimeh Abboud (1896 – 1940; Arabic: كريمة عبّود), was a Palestinian professional photographer and artist who lived and worked in Palestine in the first half of the twentieth century. She was one of the first woman photographers in Palestine and the Middle East.

== Biography ==
Karimeh Abbud was born in Bethlehem. Her father Said Abbud, was working as a teacher in Bethlehem, after the family had moved from Khiam, in South of Lebanon to Palestine. At the turn of the century, he became pastor of the Lutheran church for the following five decades. Karimeh was the second of six children. She completed her elementary education at "Talitha Koumi" school. Her mother, Barbara Badr, was also a teacher.

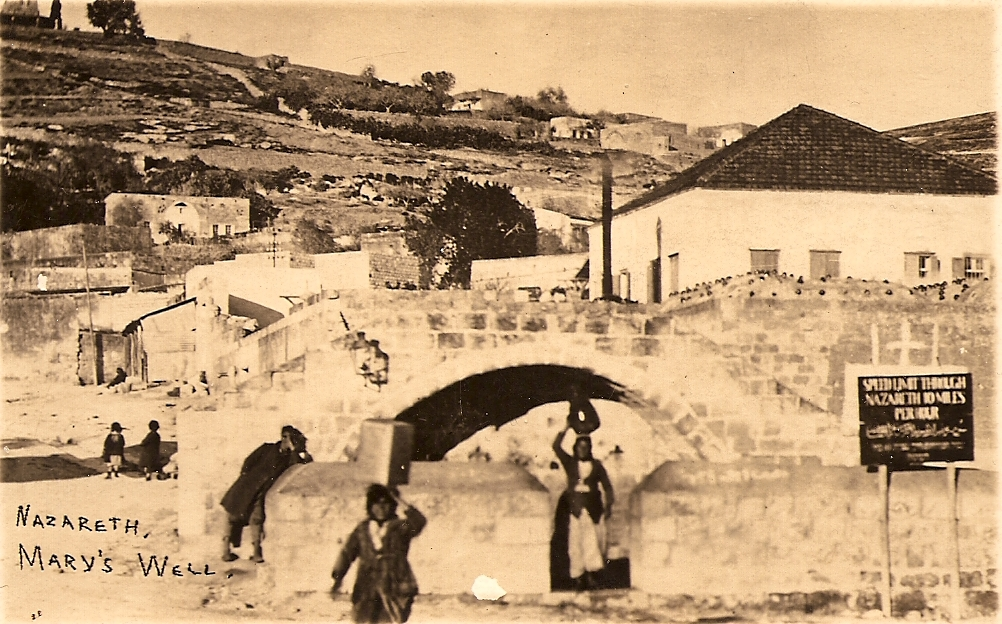
Postcard of Mary's Well, by Karimeh Abbud

She first began to take an interest in photography in 1913, after receiving a camera from her father as a gift for her 17th birthday. Her first photos were of family, friends and the landscape in Bethlehem and her first signed picture is dated October 1919.

While studying Arabic literature at the American University of Beirut in Lebanon, she took a trip to Baalbek to photograph archaeological sites there.

In 1929, she married a merchant from Marjayoun with whom she had a son, Samir.

== Photography career ==
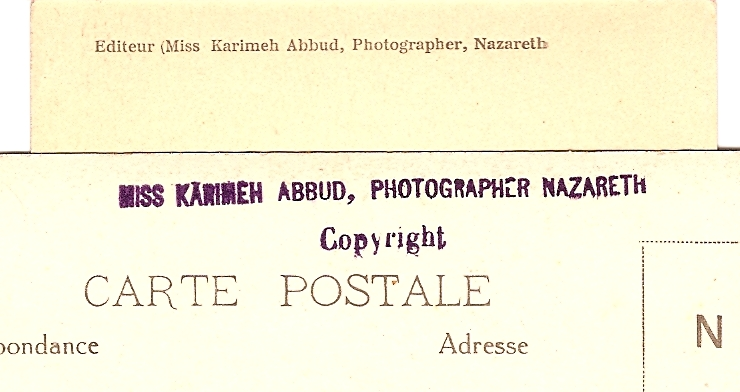
Back of two postcards with "Editeur (Miss Karimeh Abbud, Photographer Nazareth" notice, and "Miss Karimeh Abbud, Photographer Nazareth" copyright notice

She set up a home studio, earning money by taking photos of women and children, weddings and other ceremonies. She also took numerous photos of public spaces in Haifa, Nazareth, Bethlehem and Tiberias. By the 1930s she worked as a professional photographer in Nazareth. Her grandfather had been a senior pharmacist at the Nazareth English Hospital and her father had served there as a pastor. When local Nazareth photographer Fadil Saba moved to Haifa, Karimeh's studio work was in high demand for weddings and portraits in particular. The work she produced in this period was stamped in Arabic and English with the words: "Karimeh Abbud - Lady Photographer - كريمة عبود: مصورة شمس". In the mid-1930s, she began offering hand-painted copies of studio photographs. In 1924, she described herself as the "only national photographer."

== Collection and exhibitions ==
Original copies of her extensive portfolio have been collected by Ahmed Mrowat, Director of the Nazareth Archives Project. In 2006, Bouky Boaz, an Israeli antiquities collector, discovered over 400 original prints of Abbud's in a home in the Qatamon quarter of Jerusalem whose owners fled the war and the Israeli conquest in 1948. Many are signed by the artist. An exhibition of photographs by Abbud has opened at the Museum of Islamic and Near Eastern Cultures in Be'er Sheva. The exhibition focuses on tourism to Palestine based on souvenirs such as postcards, maps, spices, books and dried flowers.

== Tribute ==
On 18 November 2016, Google dedicated a Doodle to Karimeh Abbud on the 123rd anniversary of her birth. The Doodle reached all the countries of the Arab World.

== See also ==
- Khalil Raad

== Gallery; postcards by Karimeh Abbud, from ca 1925-1930 ==
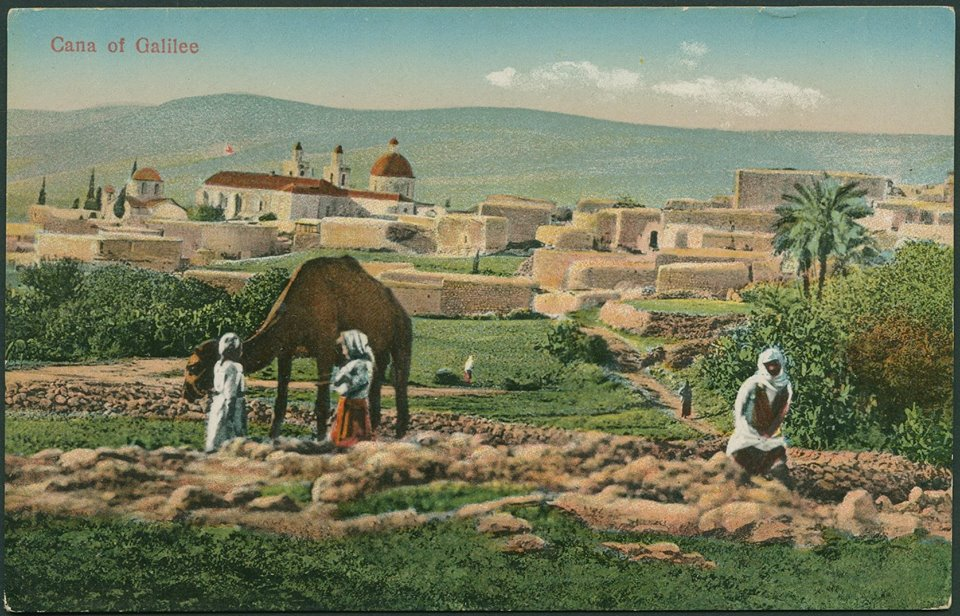
Cana of Galilee

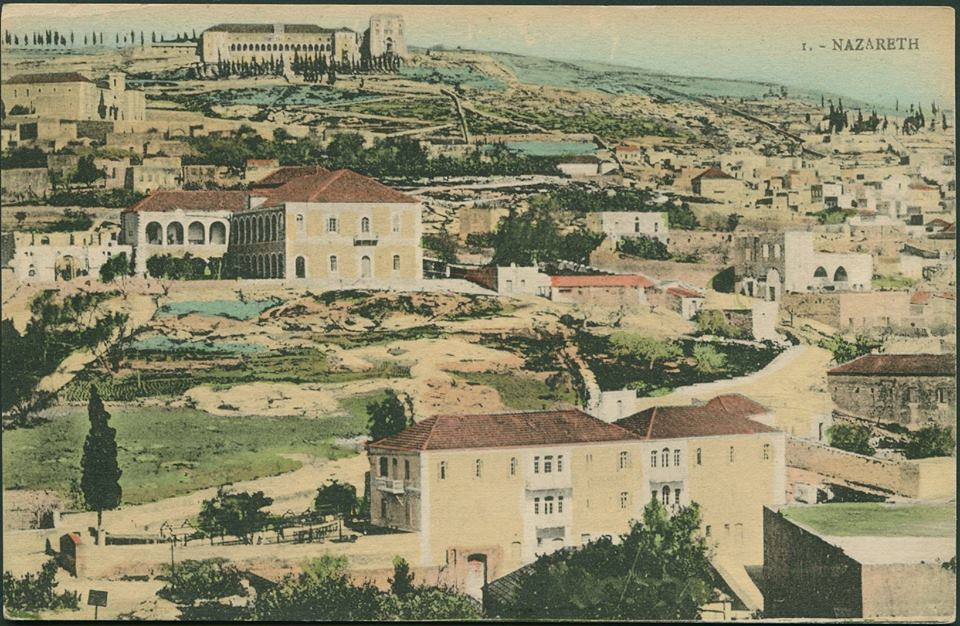
1. NAZARETH

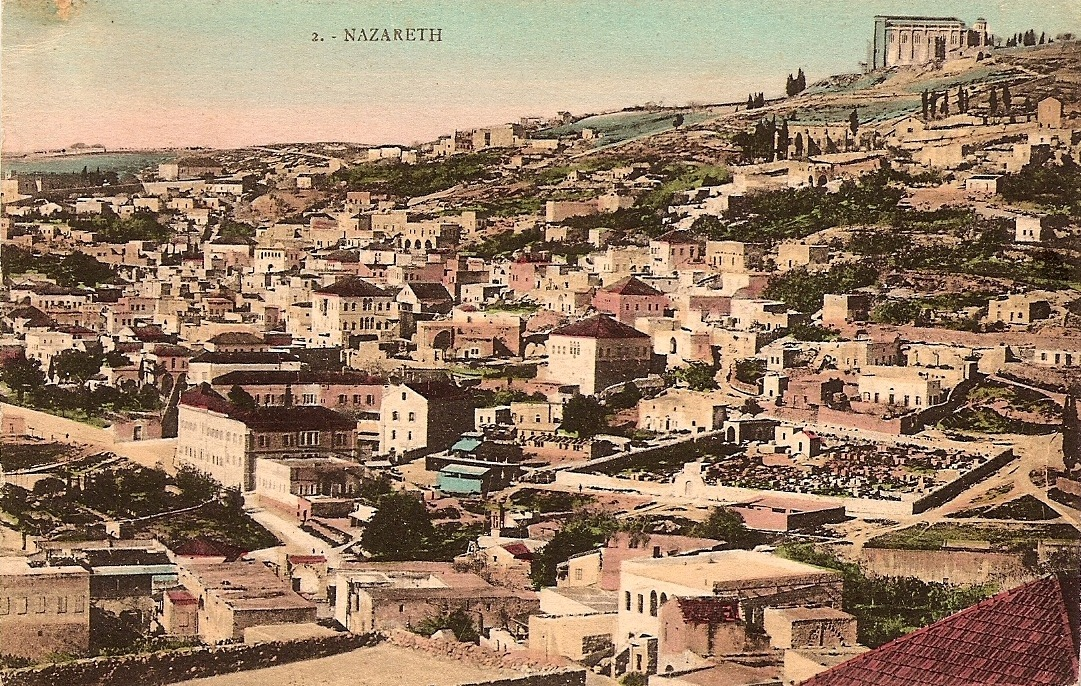
2. NAZARETH

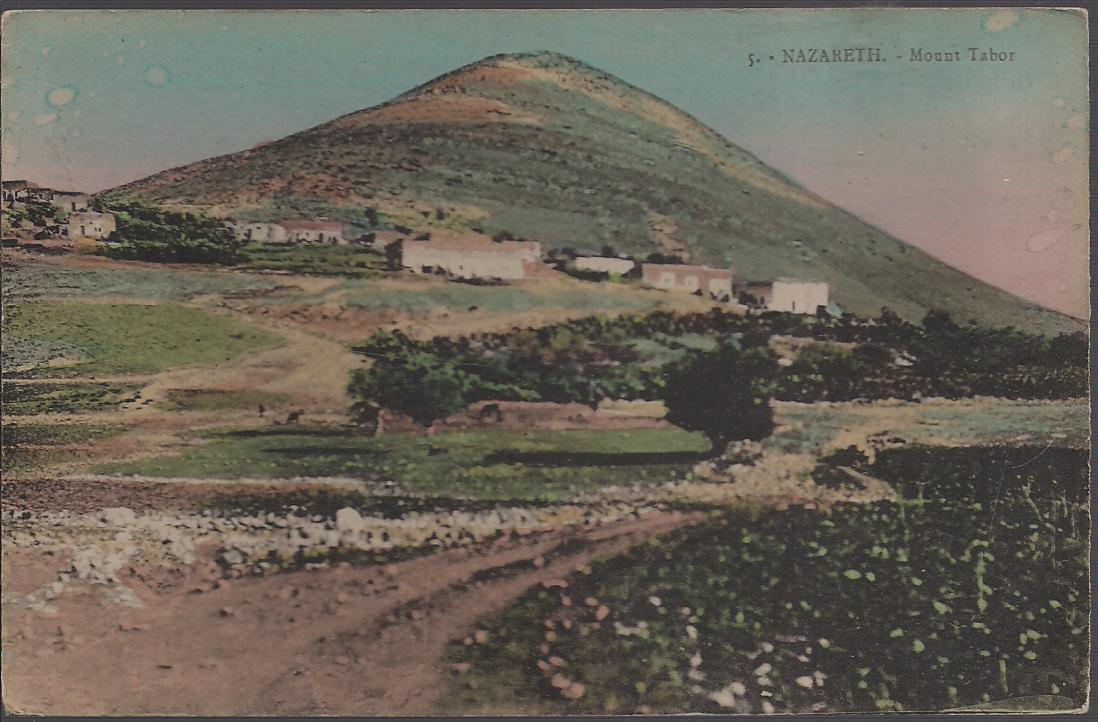
5. NAZARETH - Mount Tabor

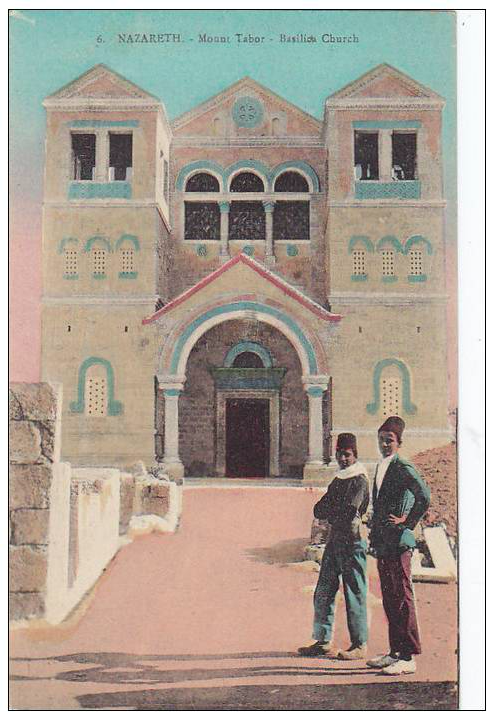
6. NAZARETH - Mount Tabor - Basilica Church

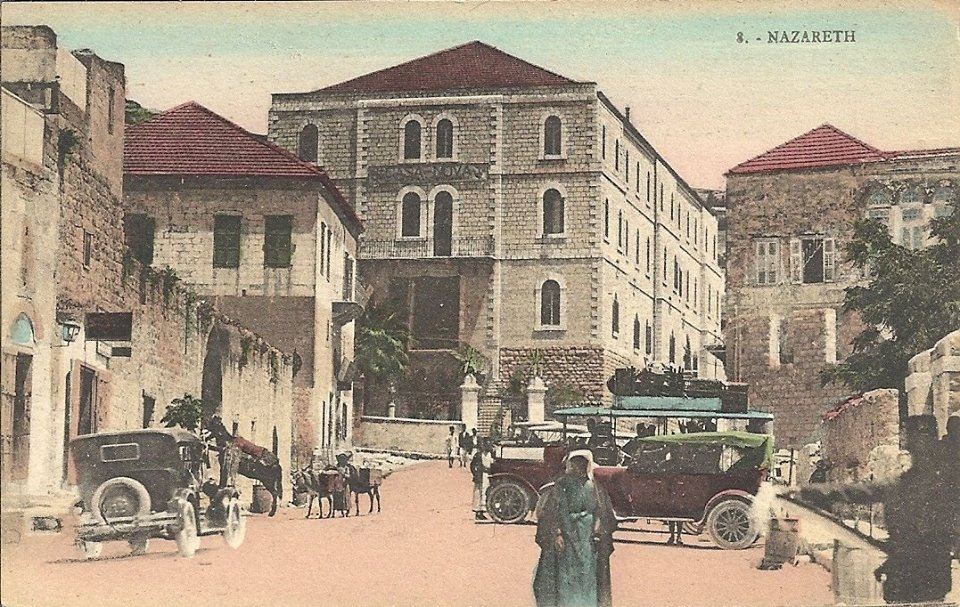
8. NAZARETH

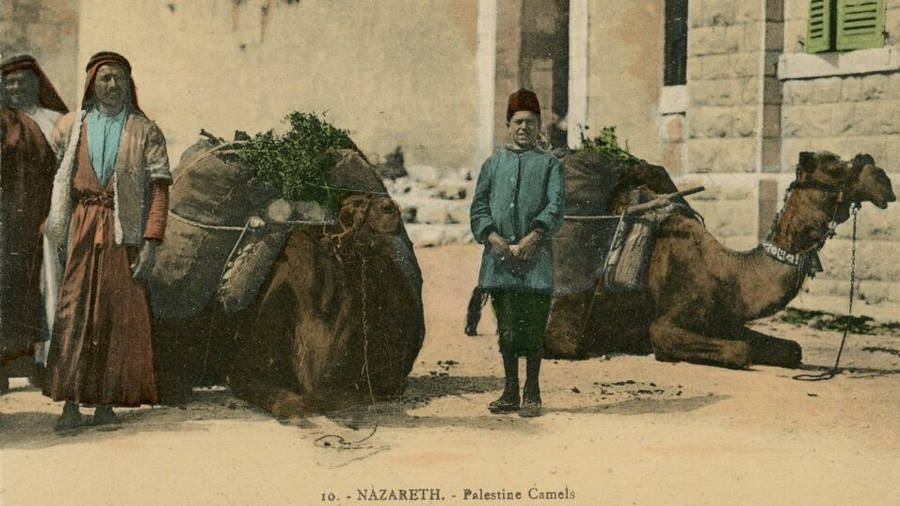
10. NAZARETH - Palestine Camels

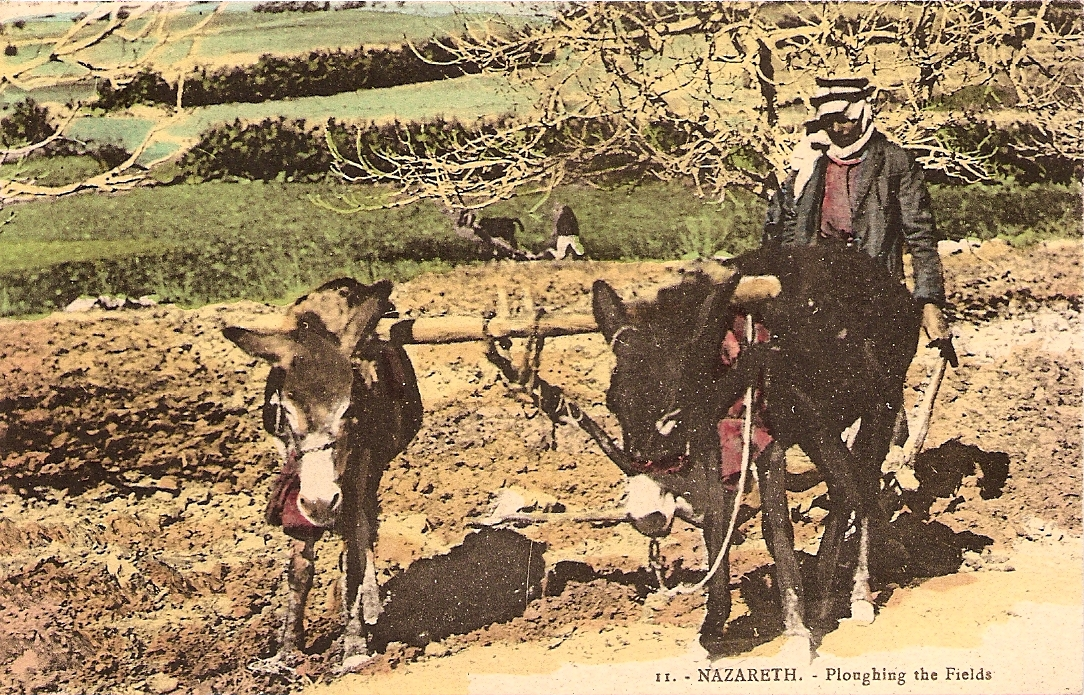
11. NAZARETH - Ploughing the fields

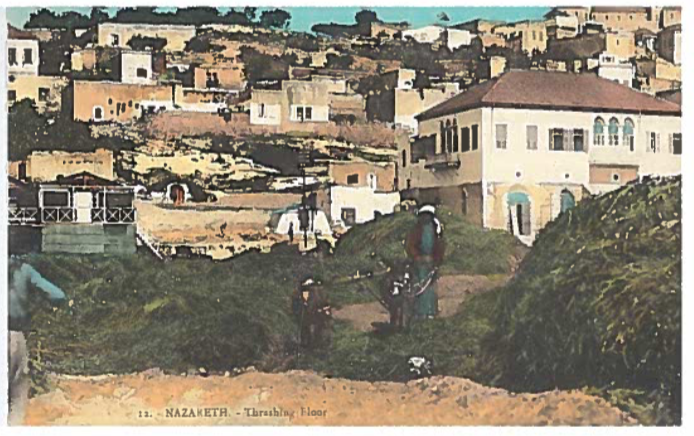
12. NAZARETH - Trashing floor

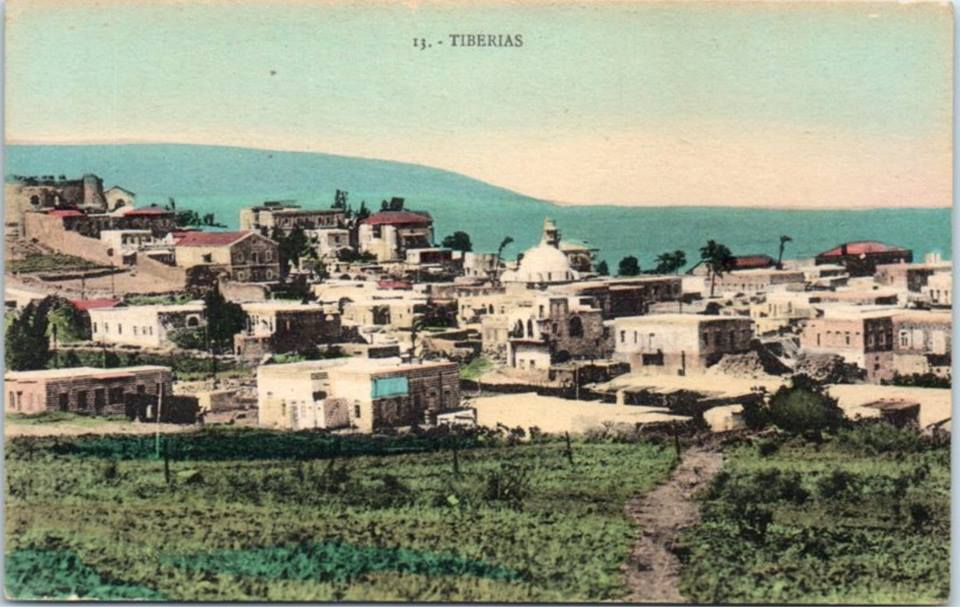
13. TIBERIAS

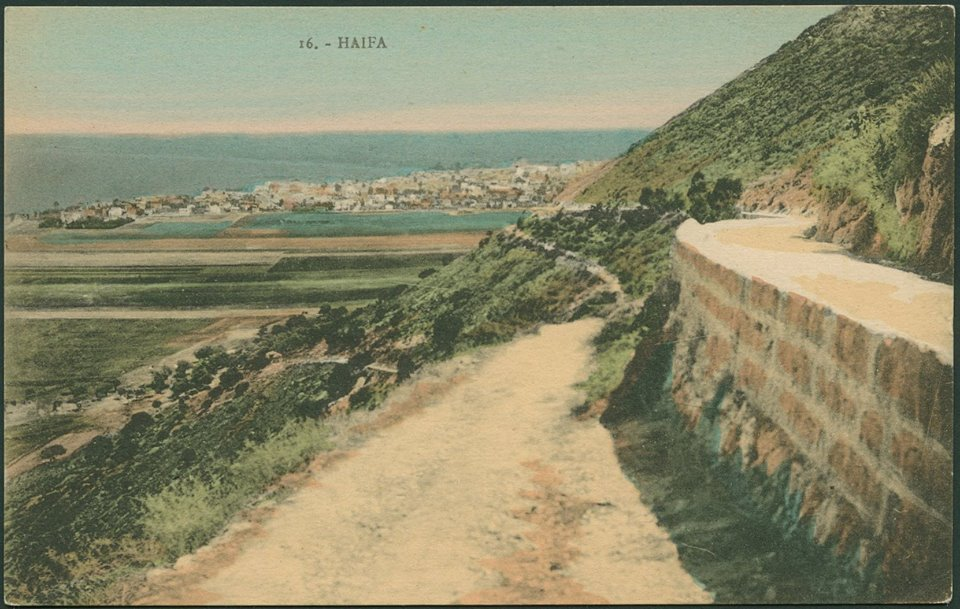
16. HAIFA

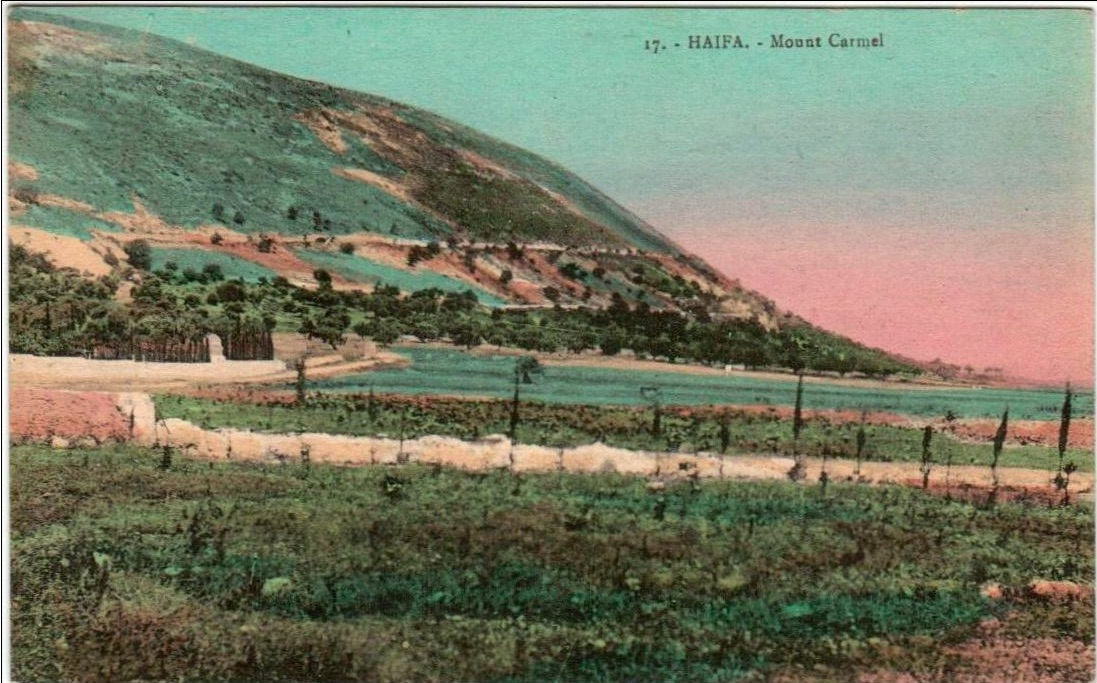
17. HAIFA - Mount Carmel

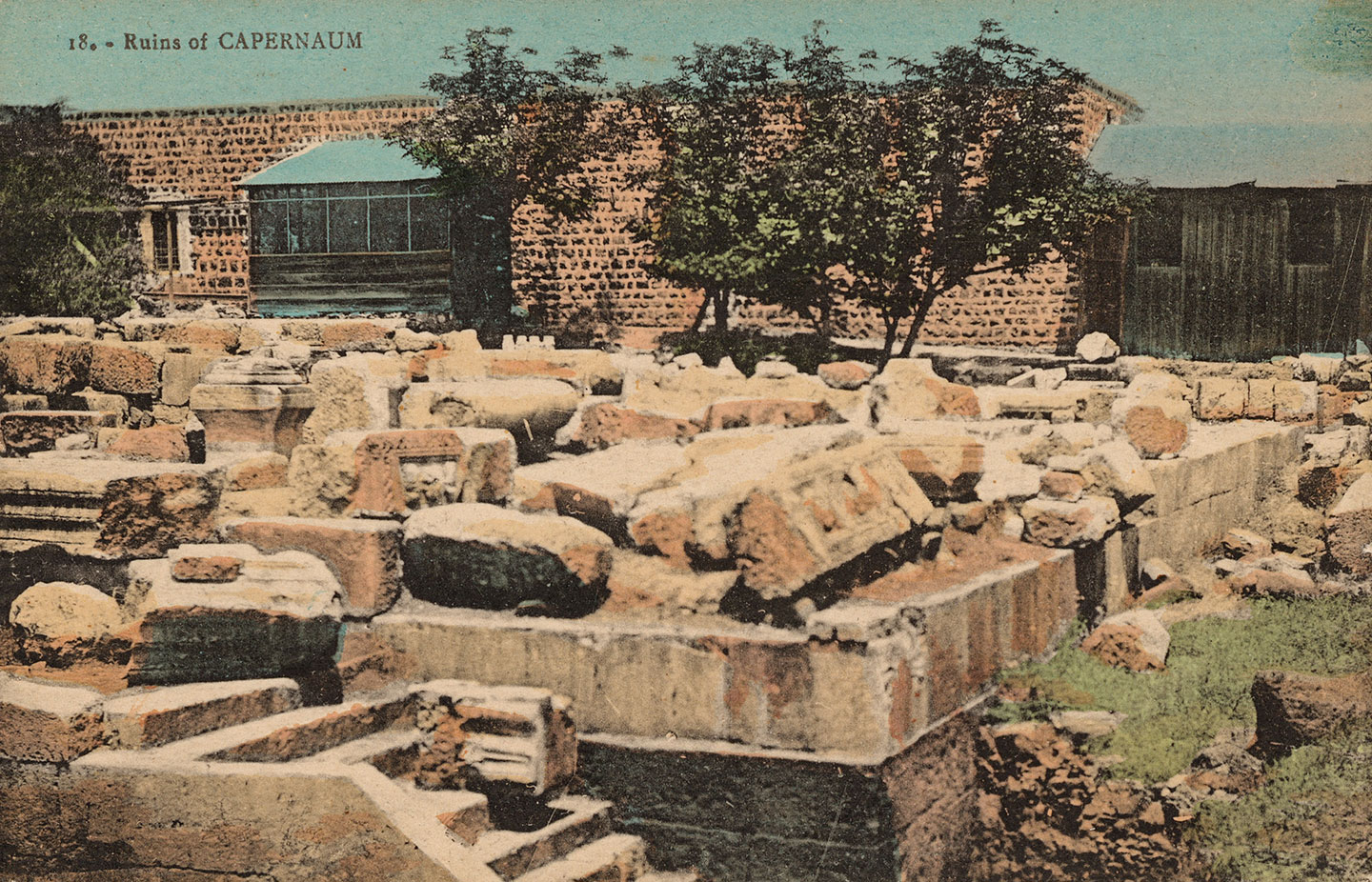
18. Ruins of CAPERNAUM

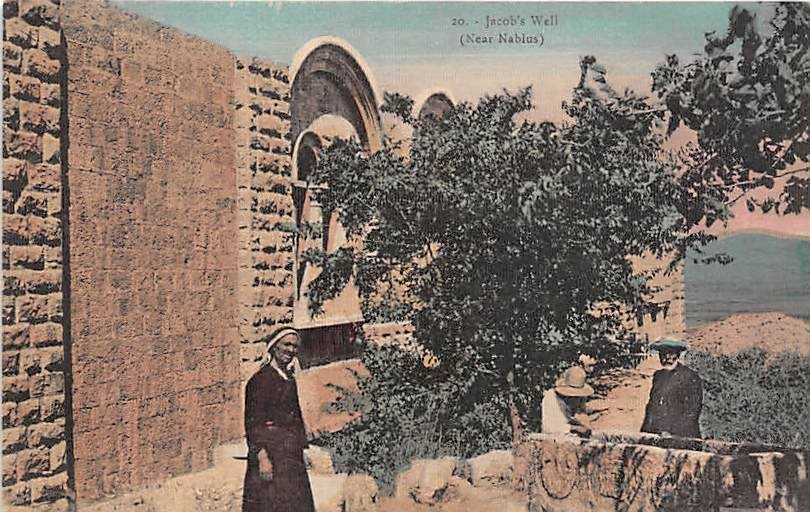
20. Jacob's Well (Near Nablus)

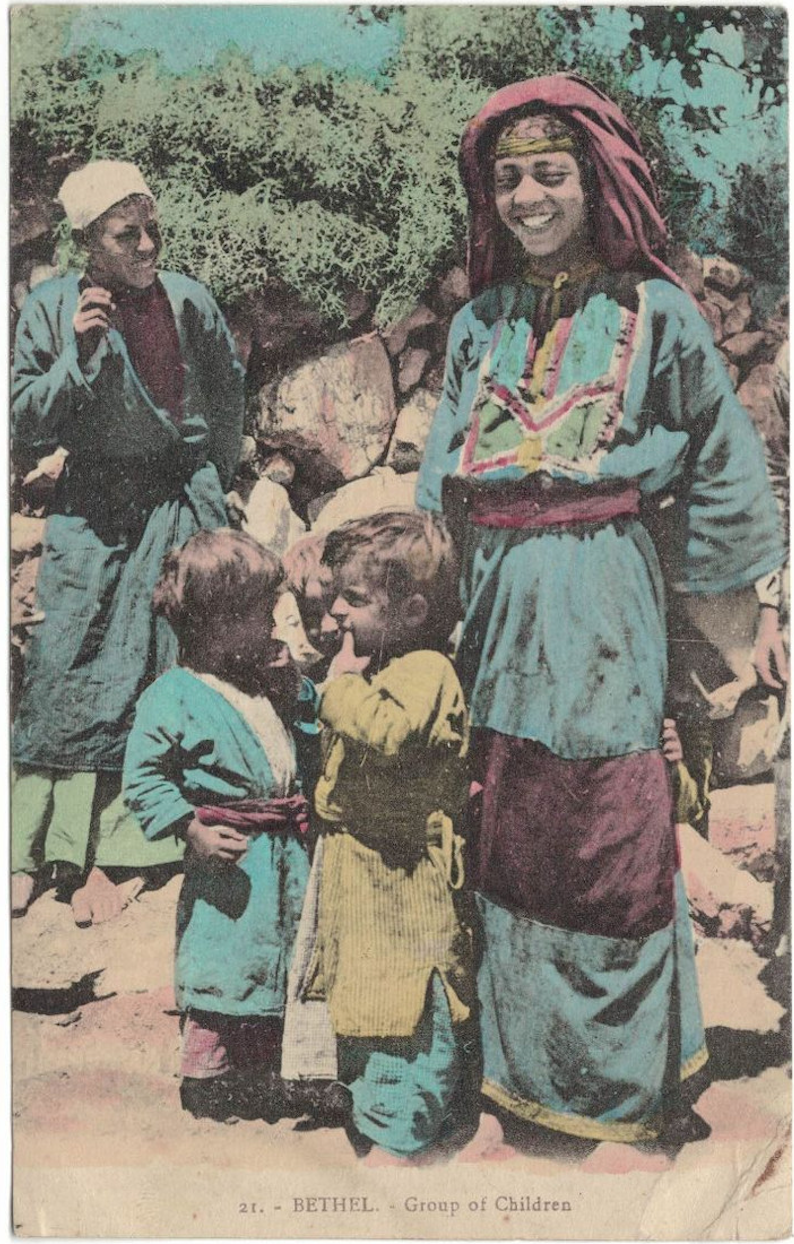
21. BETHEL - Group of Children

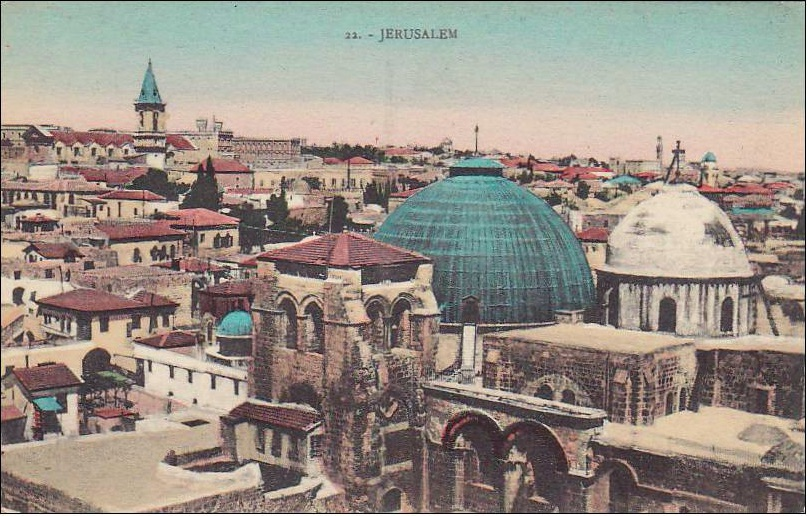
22. JERUSALEM

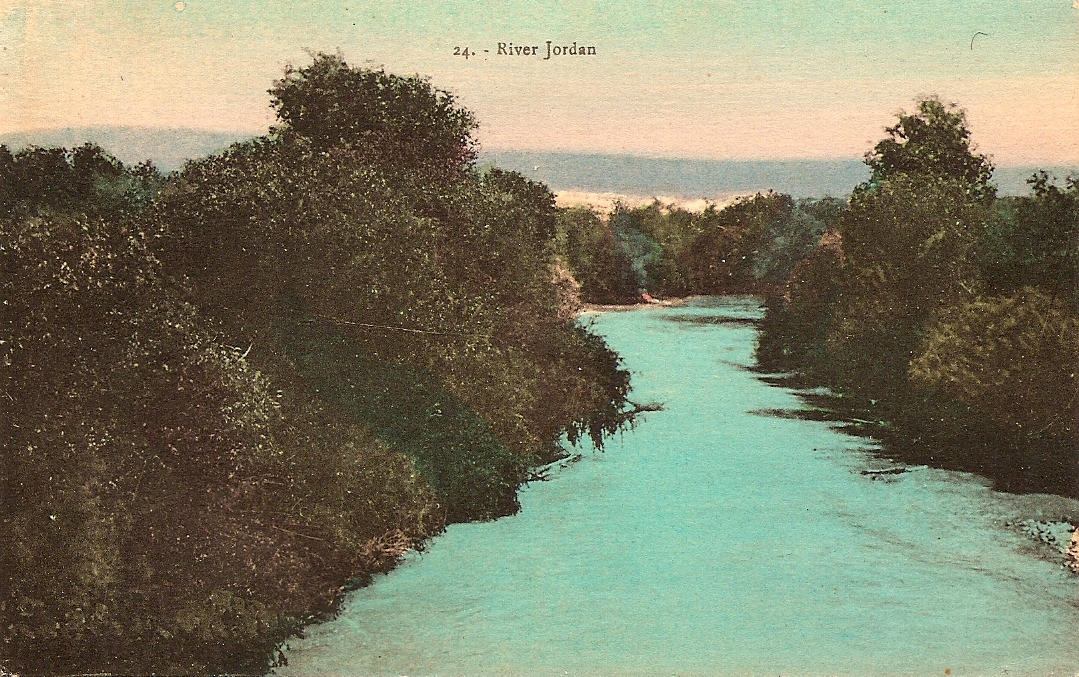
24. River Jordan

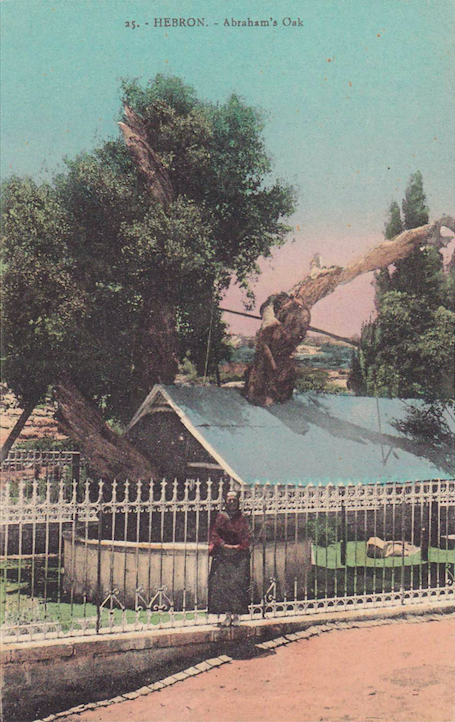
25. HEBRON - Abraham's oak

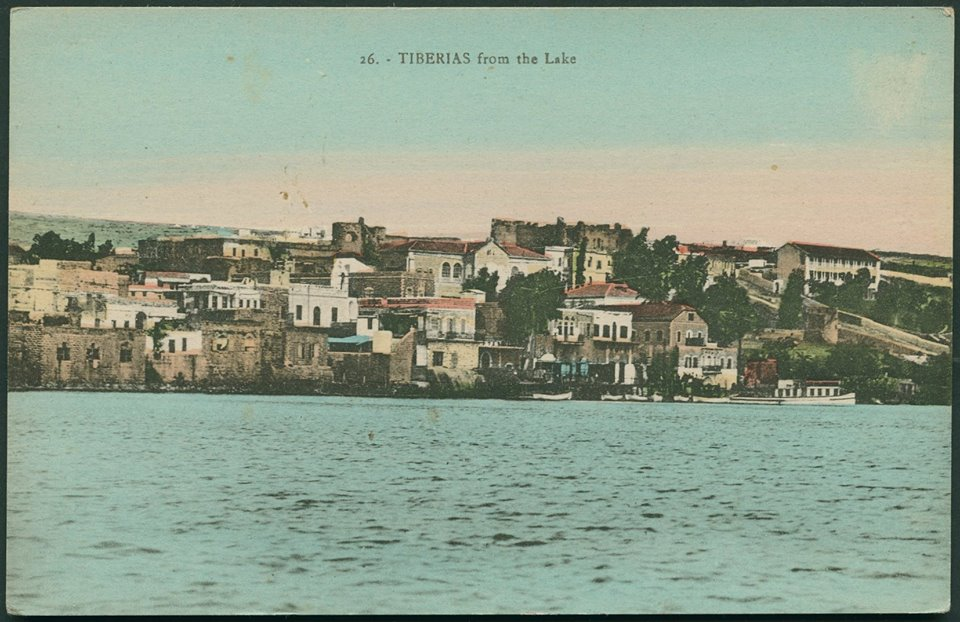
26. TIBERIAS from the lake

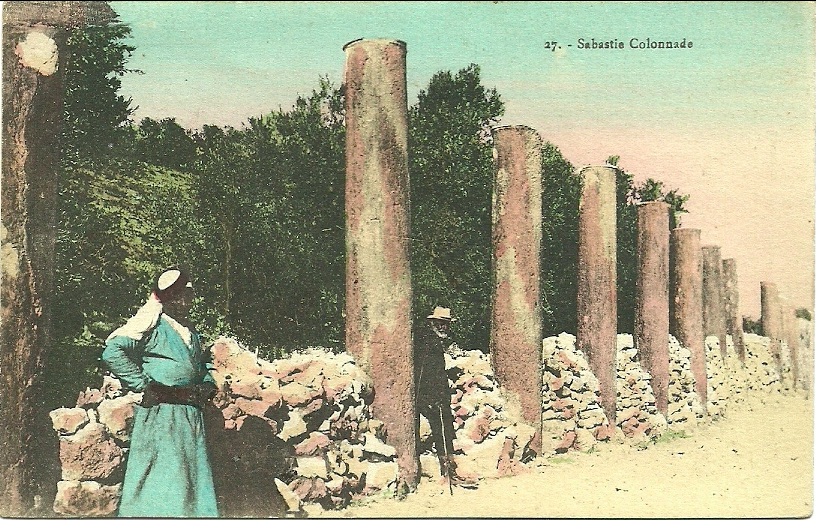
27. Sebastie Colonnade

== Documentary films ==
- Mahasen Nasser-Eldin: Restored Pictures. Documentary (22 minutes), Palestinian Territories 2012, Vimeo (Arabic with English subtitles)
- Issam Ballan: Karimeh Abbud: The first Palestinian female photographer. Documentary (11 minutes), Palestinian Territories 2016, YouTube (Arabic)
