= Winifred Coate =

British missionary headteacher and relief organizer

Winifred Annie Coate
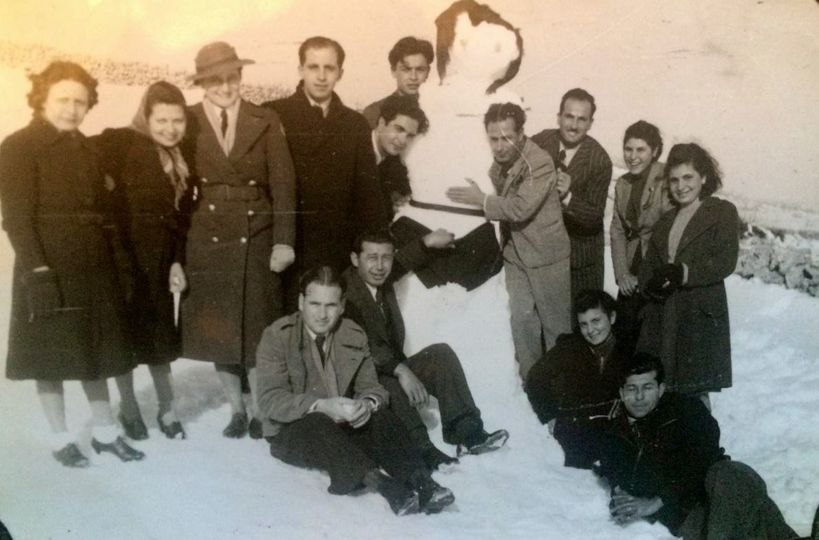
- c. 1942 - in centre left of photo
- Born: 25 April 1893; London Borough of Islington
- Died: 23 November 1977 (aged 84); Cheam
- Occupation: headteacher
- Employer: Church Mission Society
- Known for: work in Jordan

Winifred Annie Coate MBE (25 April 1893 – 23 November 1977) was a British missionary headteacher and relief organizer. She established a model community in Zerqa where she found water and used this to supply water, work and land for refugees in that area of Jordan.

== Life ==
Coate was born in London Borough of Islington in 1893. She went to Westfield College in London. After she graduated with an English degree she went on to the Church Missionary Society College.

In 1928 Coate became the principal of the Jerusalem Girls' College. She had been head hunted by Mabel Warburton who was the outgoing principal of the school. She led the college until 1943 during a turbulent political period. The college had students from different faiths, multi ethnic and different nationalities and they were being taught during periods of sectarian atrocities. Moslem parents chose the school because it was an all-girls school. Coate was very protective of the schools atmosphere and she had a wall built to stop youths from overlooking the playground. Without the wall then Moslem girls had to wear veils during games. In 1940 the school opened new Kindergarten facilities in Germantown. In 1943 the staff decided that too much was being asked of them and she was asked to leave.

In 1951 she was made an OBE in the birthday honours as a British subject resident in the Hashemite Kingdom of the Jordan.

In 1963 she was responsible for finding water to support Palestinians at Zerqa in Jordan. She had decided that water must exist because of the remains of castles and with the help of a water diviner they decided the place to drill. They found water and this was turned into a supply with a grant from Oxfam. The water enabled her to establish fifty farms led by previously landless peasants. They were Bedouin, from Palestine and Jordan. Her project became a model for similar schemes where charity money was used to not just supply relief but also work and land.

In the 1976 the New Years Honours list she was awarded an MBE for her work in Jordan.

Coate died in Cheam in 1977 after she had been flown back to the UK.
