= EMMS Nazareth Hospital =

The Nazareth Hospital
- The Nazareth Trust
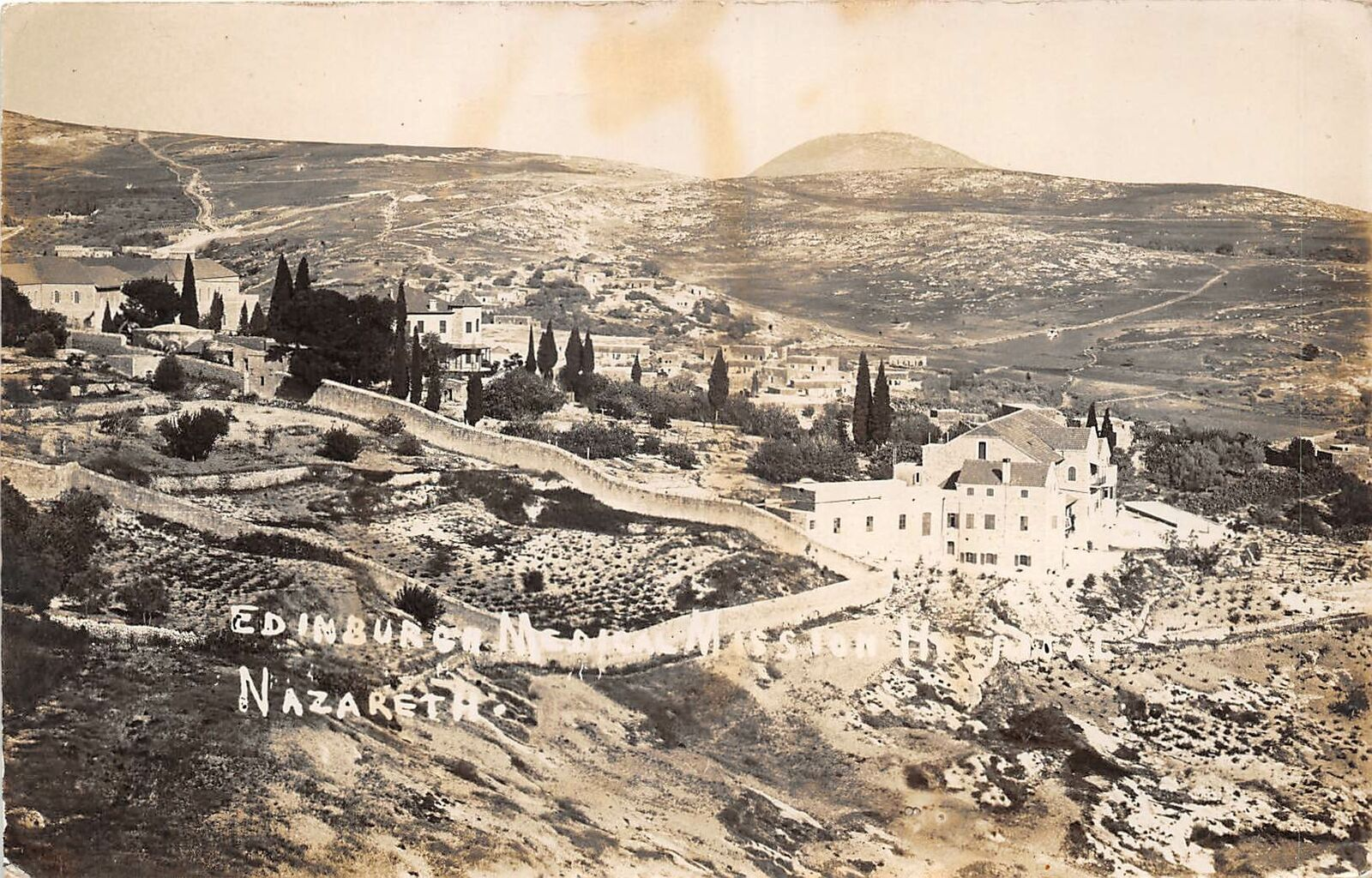
- Edinburgh Medical Mission Hospital, Nazareth, by Karimeh Abbud, ca 1925

- Location within Jezreel Valley region of Israel

Geography
- Location: Nazareth, Northern District, Israel
- Coordinates: 32.7017°N 35.2917°E

Organisation
- Type: Community
- Patron: EMMS International

Services
- Emergency department: Yes
- Beds: 147

History
- Founded: 1861

Links
- Website: www.nazarethtrust.org/nazareth-hospital
- Lists: Hospitals in Israel

The EMMS Nazareth Hospital, also known as Scottish Hospital and English Hospital, is the Christian community hospital in Nazareth, Israel. It was founded as a Christian mission by Kaloost Vartan and the Edinburgh Medical Missionary Society in 1861. The hospital now houses 147 beds, employs over 500 staff, and receives over 50,000 visits annually.

== Background ==
The Nazareth Hospital project was originally led by Kaloost Vartan with the fundraising support of William Thomson of the 39 Cowgate dispensary. Vartan, born in Constantinople to an Armenian family in 1835, he attended an American Protestant School for Armenian Boys. During the Crimean War, he served as an interpreter for British forces. There, he was moved and inspired by the poor conditions of war, and by the care provided at the hospitals run by Florence Nightingale. Vartan moved to Edinburgh, Scotland to study medicine. His studies were funded by the newly founded Edinburgh Medical Missionary Society (EMMS). Established in 1841 by a group of doctors, the EMMS aimed to provide medical services to foreign countries, to "circulate information on medical mission [sic], help other institutions engaged in the same work and assist as many missionary stations as their funds would permit." Vartan was first funded by the Syrian Asylum Fund in 1861 to aid massacre victims in Beirut. After the Syrian Asylum Committee was dissolved, the EMMS recruited his services for a new mission in Nazareth starting in 1866.

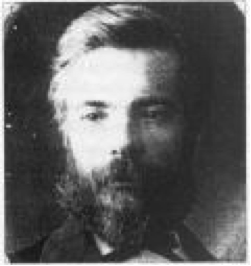
Dr. Kaloost Vartan

== History ==
=== Ottoman period ===
In 1861, Vartan arrived in Nazareth to begin work. He joined Johannes or John Zeller, a missionary of the Church Mission Society. Zeller was an Anglican priest, and helped Dr. Vartan carry out surgeries with chloroform anesthesia. Initially, Vartan was confronted with a campaign against him by local healers, who saw his plan of establishment a threat to their practices. There was also a question of funding, as the committee that sent Vartan to Nazareth disbanded in 1864. Through these tribulations, Dr. Vartan continued to practice medicine. In 1865, he treated the son of the Mayor of Nazareth, and won the title, "The Great Doctor."

Vartan first received patients in his own home. William Burns Thompson, superintendent of the Coogate dispensary, supported him for two years after the original committee dissolved. In 1866, the EMMS officially adopted the Nazareth Hospital project. The society provided £100 for a few beds for surgical cases, which were installed in the upper room of Vartan’s house. As the only hospital near Nazareth, these accommodations were obviously insufficient, and Vartan received approval from the EMMS for the purchase for two adjacent houses. One would serve as a hospital, and the other his residence and dispensary. Only a year after the expansion, 36 inpatients were admitted, and 70–100 patients were treated daily. This small dispensary was located on the east side of Nazareth. A small flow of clean water was available there, but rainwater was used more frequently. The hospital staff ran a boys’ Sunday school and soup kitchen, as well as an artists’ club, in addition to normal hospital operations. As a Christian mission, prayers were held every morning at 7am. Most nurses and staff were native to Ottoman Palestine, and had minimal English skills, which proved challenging to Vartan and his wife. Both patients and staff came from various religious denominations. Most were Christian, but Jews and Muslims worked for and were treated by the hospital, as well. An early survey of patients shows that in 1899, 5,747 Christians and 2,680 Muslims sought care in the hospital.

In 1879, a plot of land overlooking Nazareth was purchased for the establishment of a bigger hospital. Before anything could be done, Vartan was tasked with getting permission, a firman, from the Ottoman authorities to establish a dispensary. The Turkish government put a stop to his efforts to build after a misleading promise to provide a permit. No more progress was made until 1895, when the EMMS directors approved a new site west of Nazareth. Vartan died in 1908, before any construction could begin.

Frederick John Scrimgeour succeeded Vartan as the head doctor of the mission, along with two European nurses. The new hospital was almost complete, when World War I broke out through Europe and the Middle East, and British physicians were ordered to leave Palestine. The new hospital was requisitioned by the military, stripped, and used as stables. While Scrimgeour was stuck in Egypt and unable to return; two nurses from the hospital operated in his rented residence downtown.

=== British period ===
The hospital was restored in 1919, and normal operations slowly resumed. In that year, the hospital was recognized by the British government’s mandate as a hospital for training nurses. In 1924, the hospital was officially inaugurated and, by 1935, it had electricity and a sanitary annex for tuberculosis patients. The mission began extending services beyond elementary care. For example, by 1924, plans were adopted for infant welfare clinics in a nearby village. In 1933, an east wing was added to the hospital, which contained the "Abercrombie Ward". It soon took on the name, the "Hospital on the Hill". By this time, Scrimgeour had retired, and William D. Bathgate and Sister Mary Parkinson had taken charge of the hospital.

=== Israeli period ===
==== 20th century ====
In May 1948, the state of Israel was established. Runa Mackay, who joined the mission a few years later, reported that hospital operations were generally uninhibited by the political upheaval, and the majority Arab population of Nazareth remained. However, an influx of refugees created more demand on the workers. At this time, the hospital still only had 100 beds. This pressure resulted in the recruitment of more doctors. In addition to MacKay, Hester and Bernath joined the mission in May 1956. Their work inspired major changes in the hospital. Tester joined the hospital staff in 1952. Under his supervision, the hospital installed a modern laundry system, a new outpatient facility, nurses' home and chapel, and new accommodations for staff from 1957 to 1964.

Bernath arrived at the mission in 1956, and was appointed as administrator of the hospital in 1969. He worked to continue updating the hospital, and oversaw the development of a new maternity clinic, kitchen, and most importantly, the recruitment of specialists to provide dialysis and physiotherapy. Other significant improvements include the addition of the "Tower Block,” an intensive care unit, in 1976. A unit for renal dialysis was opened in October 1981, and the first computer was installed the following year. This period saw another increase in hospital staff. Many of the newly hired doctors came from the Arab community, in particular, Nakhle Bishara, who became the medical director of the hospital in 1981. In that same year, Israeli healthcare reform named the Nazareth Hospital as the official district hospital for the Nazareth area. This, in addition to a strike by Israeli doctors in 1983, caused a massive influx in patients, leaving the hospital once again inadequate.

In 1984, a delegation from Edinburgh was sent to review the hospital's operations and establish a plan to accommodate the renewed demand for services. Fred Aitken was appointed as head the implementation of the plan, which aimed to increase the standards of the facilities, rather than the capacity of the hospital, and had an operating budget of 3.5 million pounds.

In 1988 Robert W. Martin succeeded Bernath as superintendent. In 1995, further healthcare reforms were instituted which guaranteed basic healthcare to all residents of Israel. The hospital recruited help, namely from G. Anthony Holt, who became interim general administrator, and Derek Thompson, a hospital administrator from the United Kingdom, to make further transitions to a large-scale medical facility.

==== 21st century ====
In 2001, The EMMS split into two separate organizations, EMMS International and EMMS Nazareth. Thompson served as the first CEO of EMMS Nazareth, followed in 2007 Joseph Maine. In that same year, Elia Abdo became the General Director of the Nazareth Hospital. In 2010, Bishara Bisharat became the head of the hospital. In 2009, the title "EMMS Nazareth" was replaced with "The Nazareth Trust." After almost 150 years, the Nazareth Hospital and nursing school are still operational.

Today (2012) the hospital continues to expand its practices, led by the head of the hospital, Fahid Hakeem, Kemal Kem and a management team. For example, in October 2012, the hospital opened a pregnancy and childbirth complex in the nearby village of Umm Al-Fahm. Nazareth is now home to 250,000 people, and the hospital is equipped with 147 beds and over 500 staff. The hospital is now also home to biochemistry and hematology labs, as well as a blood bank. The hospital has various departments, including childbirth and gynecology, orthopedic surgery, general surgery, urology, cosmetic surgery, emergency, radiology, cardiology, preterm birth, anesthesia, and research. Although it remains Christian in principle, the hospital neither hires nor treats patients preferentially.
