= Mabel Clarisse Warburton =

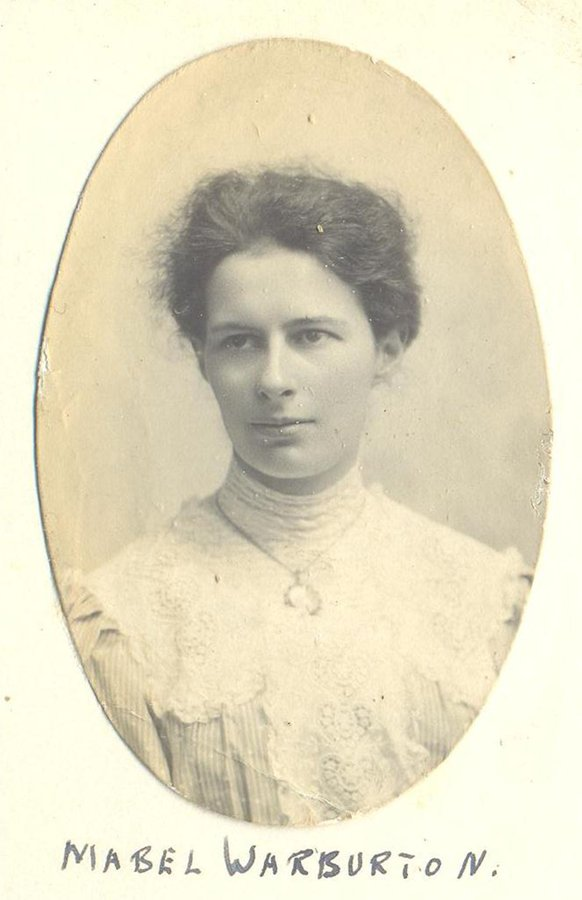
- Born: 1879; Kings Langley
- Died: 1961 (aged 81–82); Waltham Abbey
- Education: Cheltenham Ladies' College
- Occupation: missionary

Mabel Clarisse Warburton MBE (1879–1961) was an English Christian missionary and educationalist. She founded the British High School, later called the Jerusalem Girls' College.

== Biography ==
She was born 22 June 1879 in Kings Langley, Hertfordshire. Her father had died before her birth and her mother died in childbirth, so she was brought up by her grandparents at Bradwell House near Wolverton, Buckinghamshire. Her brother died in an institution after being declared insane. She was educated at Cheltenham Ladies' College 1895–1897.

She worked in Egypt as a missionary and was then headmistress of the British Syrian Training College in Beirut from 1899 until the start of the first world war in 1914. In 1918 she worked with bishop Rennie MacInnes in Jerusalem, and founded and partly funded the British High School, later the Jerusalem Girls' College. This school educated both Jewish and Muslim girls, with high academic standards, and Warburton was its headmistress from 1919 to 1926. In 1928 Winifred Coate became the principal of the Jerusalem Girls' College. She had been head hunted by Warburton.

From 1926 to 1935 she was active in social work in Bethnal Green, London, and after the second world war she founded the Ahliyyah School for Girls in Amman.

She was appointed MBE.

She died 16 November 1961 at Waltham Abbey, leaving her home, known as "Welcome Cottage", to provide accommodation for elderly local residents. This charity later linked to the Abbeyfield Society, and two replacement buildings, later combined, keep her name as the "Warburton and Clarisse Lodge".

== Publications ==
- Warburton, Mabel Clarisse (1959). The unceasing conflict : the story of the church in the first five centuries with some modern parallels. SPCK.
