= John Zeller =

German missionary

- Born: Johannes Zeller; 1830; Besigheim, Kingdom of Württemberg, German Confederation
- Died: February 19, 1902 (aged 71–72)
- Education: Basel Mission
- Occupation(s): Missionary, Educator, Scholar
- Title: Reverend

John Zeller (1830–1902), also known by his German name Johannes Zeller, was a 19th-century Protestant missionary in Ottoman Palestine. Zeller's four decades left a lasting impact in the areas of Protestant Christianity, scholarship, and education.

== Early life ==
Zeller was born in 1830 in Besigheim (near Stuttgart), with a family heritage of more than 300 years of filling different offices in the church. At the age of 24 he graduated from Basel Mission School, and did his year of practicum in England. Since he was planning to come to the Middle East he dedicated this year to learning English and Arabic. In 1855 he was ordained as a deacon in the Anglican Church, and was sent to the Holy Land by the Church Mission Society. He arrived there in 1857.

== Mission in Palestine ==
After spending two years in Nablus, he was stationed in Nazareth, where he stayed for the next 20 years. In Nazareth he became a very well-known person, not only in the town itself, but also in all of the Galilee area. In 1858 he went back for a year to England, there he was ordained as an Anglican priest. When he returned, he married Hanna Maria Sophie, the daughter of Maria Gobat and Samuel Gobat, the second Anglican Bishop in Jerusalem.

Zeller believed that education was the main method to get to the heart of the people and to increase the Protestant influence in Nazareth and the area. This was not easy, since there was great pressure on those people who sent their children to the Protestant school. However, Zeller persevered to establish and develop the school, believing that it would be the seed for the Anglican denomination. Furthermore, he did not stop in Nazareth, but opened classes in Reineh, Kafr Kanna and Jaffa of Nazareth (Yafa an-Naseriyye), and later on in Shefa-'Amr. In the early 1870s he rented a room in Acre and started classes there. He also assisted his Armenian colleague Kaloost Vartan of the Edinburgh Medical Missionary Society in the founding of the Nazareth Hospital.

Zeller’s activities contributed significantly to the establishment and the growth of the denomination, especially in Nazareth where the need to build a proper center became a pressing one. In July 1871, and after a long contest with the Ottoman governor, the building of the Christ Church, Nazareth was completed. At the dedication ceremony on 1 October 1871, three of his helpers were ordained: Seraphim Boutaji and Michael Ka’war. These were the first Arabs to be ordained in the Diocese of Jerusalem. Also ordained was Zeller’s colleague James Jacob Huber.

After 20 years in Nazareth, Zeller was transferred to Jerusalem in 1876. By that time he was considered an expert in the fields of Arabic and Muslim evangelism. This became a very important issue for the Church Mission Society in the 1870s, when it was reorganized to concentrate on evangelizing among the Muslim community. Zeller was one of the main people who trained the missionaries. In Jerusalem he took charge of the Bishop's School and founded a Preparandi Institute which was devoted to training teachers.

In 1901, he realized that it was time to retire, and in the same year he left Jerusalem to go back to Germany. He died of heart failure on 19 February 1902.

== Legacy ==
Zeller left behind him a long list of people (especially indigenous) whom he had trained and equipped properly for the ministry in the Middle East. He also made contribution to archaeological research during his long career in Palestine. During his ministry in Nazareth he helped to establish the Anglican school, the Protestant Church, and an orphanage for girls, thus making a great contribution to the city and the whole Galilee. The school and church in Nazareth still exist, and the orphanage is now St Margaret's Guest House.
