= Christ Church, Nazareth =

Anglican church in Nazareth

Coordinates: 32°42′08.5″N 35°17′45.5″E

Christ Church
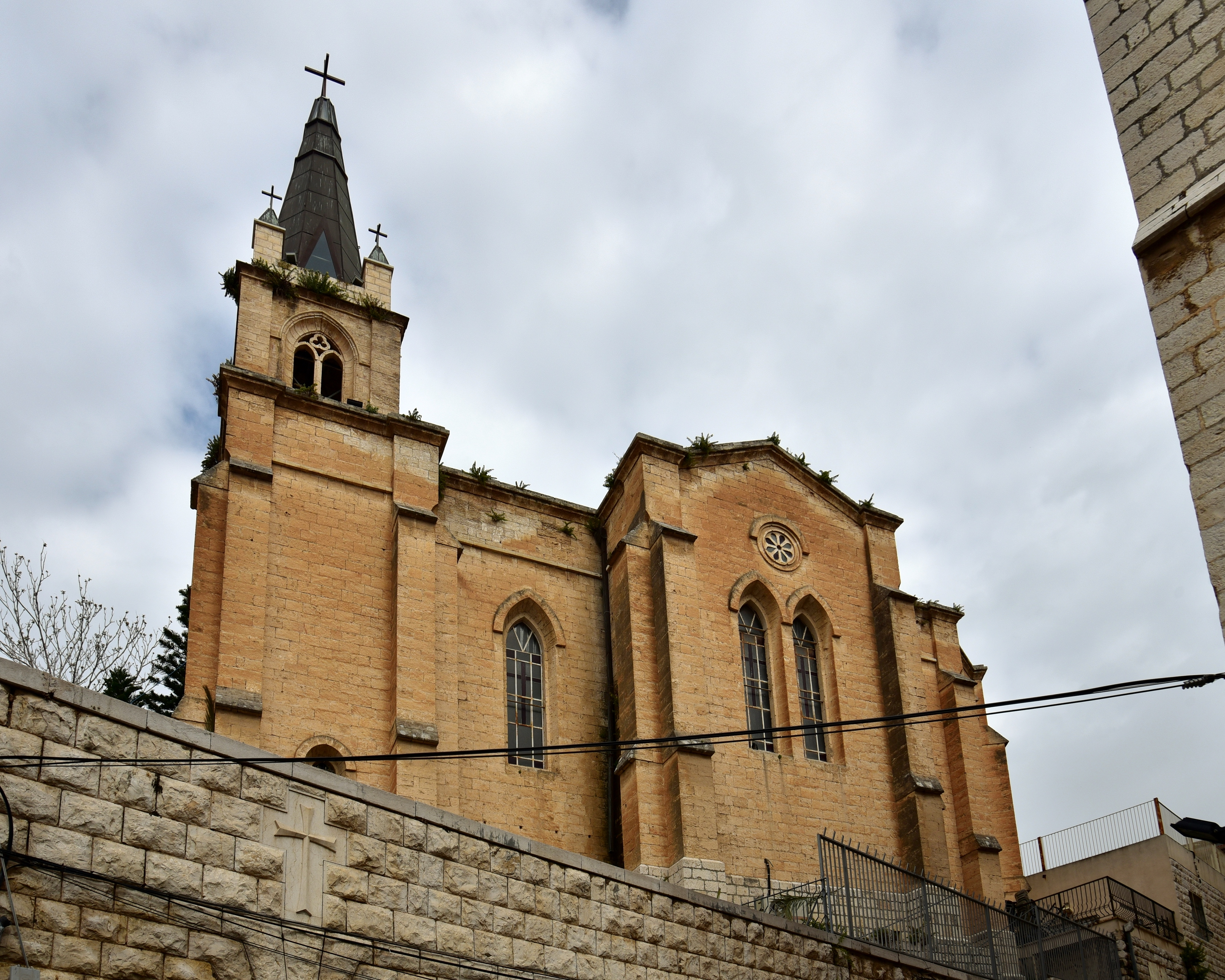
- Christ Church
- Location: Ha-Mashiakh Anglican Church and School, Nazareth
- Country: Israel
- Denomination: Anglican

History
- Founded: 1869; 157 years ago
- Consecrated: 1 October 1871

Architecture
- Architect: Ferdinand Stadler
- Architectural type: Church
- Style: Gothic Revival
- Completed: 1871

Administration
- Province: Episcopal Church in Jerusalem and the Middle East
- Diocese: Jerusalem

Christ Church (Hebrew: כנסיית המשיח, romanized: Knesset HaMashiakh, lit. 'Assembly of the Mashiakh'; Arabic: كنيسة المسيح, romanized: Kanisah al-Masîḥ) is an Anglican church located in the town of Nazareth, Israel. Due to financial troubles the church could not be completed by 1871 and lacked its intended spire, until one was finally added 143 years later, in 2014. Nearby lies the famous Basilica of the Annunciation.

== History ==
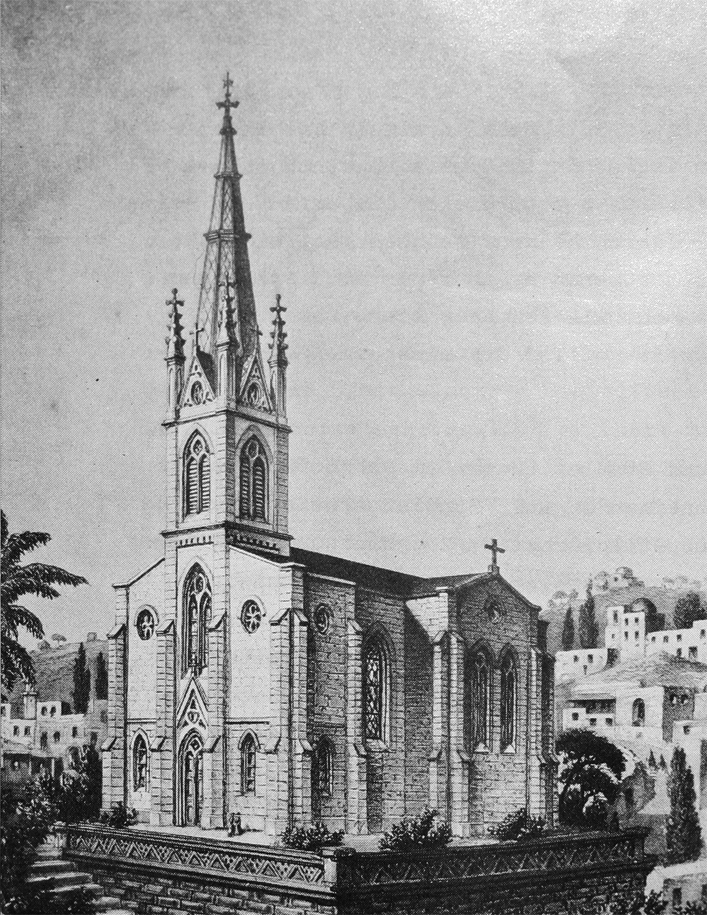
Drawing of the church showing the spire that was not built until 2014

Christ Church in Nazareth is the last work of Swiss architect Ferdinand Stadler. Works at the site began in 1869 but construction was not completed when Stadler died in 1870. When the church was finished in 1871, it was the second Anglican church to be built in the Holy Land. The first is located in Jerusalem. The building was consecrated by Bishop Samuel Gobat, and Rev. John Zeller was the pastor at the time of its consecration. The Church Mission Society (CMS) provided many of the early missionaries who served at Christ Church. It served as a mission center for the region and ministry also took place in Mujeidal (today's Migdal HaEmek), Reineh, and Kafr Kanna (Cana of Galilee).

A number of influential priests of the Church of England were pastors and missionaries who ministered at Christ Church or were based there. These include Frederick Augustus Klein, Michael Ka'war, Seraphim Boutaji, and Khalil Jamal; the last of which was essential in founding the Protestant presence on the East Bank of the Jordan.

John Zeller (or Johannes Zeller, by his original German name) described worship at the church in the late 19th century with the following words:

One part of the hall is filled with girls of the boarding school and the women of the congregation; and the other is so closely packed with men, that every observer would wish to have a larger locality. The service is in Arabic, according to the liturgy of the Church of England. The responses are said by the whole congregation, and all heartily join in the singing, accompanied by a harmonium. [...] a stranger would at once be surprised to see their heads covered, either with the red fez or a little white cap, or a black handkerchief tied with a brown rope, in the Bedouin fashion; and yet he would be struck with the close attention expressed in almost every face at the time of the sermon.

On 26 September 1937, during the 1936–1939 Arab revolt in Palestine, acting District Commissioner of the Galilee Lewis Andrews was assassinated by Arab gunmen on his way to Christ Church.

As of 2013, the church has about 40 families as members, and the membership is almost entirely Arab Palestinian. There is one Arabic-language service every Sunday morning. Excepting visitors, attendance is usually around 50.

== See also ==
- Christ Church, Jerusalem
- Christianity in Israel
- Architecture in Israel
