= EMMS International =

UK-based non-governmental organization

- Formation: 30 November 1841
- Legal status: Charity
- Purpose: Medical aid
- Headquarters: Edinburgh, Scotland
- Region served: India, Malawi, Nepal, Rwanda, Zambia, U.K.
- CEO: Cathy Ratcliff
- Website: www.emms.org

EMMS International is a modern non-governmental organisation (NGO) that improves healthcare in countries around the world from its base in the UK. Starting as Edinburgh Medical Missionary Society (EMMS) in 1841, it initially promoted medical missions through lectures and publications, and later supported training for medical missionaries to work overseas to improve healthcare, including practical training in providing healthcare to the disadvantaged in Edinburgh’s Cowgate. These missionaries worked worldwide, mainly in the Middle East, China, India and Africa, where they trained colleagues and constructed dispensaries and hospitals. Over the years, its education expanded and it now helps in the training of a variety of healthcare workers in the countries where it works.

In 2001, the organization split into two charities: EMMS International and EMMS Nazareth. EMMS Nazareth, trading as the Nazareth Trust, owns and runs The Nazareth Hospital founded by EMMS. In the 1960s EMMS International had ceased sending missionaries overseas, preferring to work with faith partners and their staff in their own cultures.

In 2025 EMMS International supported 10 partners in 6 countries. It specializes in improving health and healthcare around the world. EMMS continues to provide expertise to all its partners around the world. Based in Scotland, its slogan is health for today, hope for tomorrow.

== Educational funding ==
Until the early 2000s, EMMS International provided grants for UK students’ electives in healthcare disciplines overseas. Students undertook their elective with faith partners in hospitals and primary care. Since 2010 EMMS International has refocused on operating programmes to support vulnerable young people in their home countries through healthcare training and into a job near their home, which helps to staff hard-to-staff health facilities.

== Scottish origins ==
The origin of EMMS International can be traced to an American missionary, Dr. Peter Parker, who gave a lecture in Edinburgh, Scotland, that was attended by the EMMS founders. In his lecture, Parker discussed his role as the first missionary doctor to China commissioned by the American Board of Commissioners for Foreign Missions and described his involvement in the founding of the Medical Missionary Society of China in 1832. Inspired by Parker's lecture, the Edinburgh Medical Missionary Society (EMMS) was founded on 30 November 1841. Its founders included Dr. John Abercrombie who became the first president of EMMS and Rev. Dr. Thomas Chalmers.

To meet its goals of promoting and financing medical missions, EMMS pursued several different strategies. From 1841 to 1851, EMMS largely funded special lectures on the topic of medical missionaries and how to serve people in need. EMMS transcribed these lectures and published them for wide consumption. The organisation also awarded prizes for the best-written essays on medical subjects. After a decade, EMMS’s primary objective became supporting the training of medical students to become medical missionaries. In this it was a pioneer. Its first students were David H Paterson and Wong Fun. In 1851, EMMS began giving bursaries to students studying medicine at the University of Edinburgh and Edinburgh’s Royal Colleges of Surgeons and Physicians. After a century of this work EMMS had supported approximately 440 medical students into missionary medicine, including about 60 women. These doctors were much in demand by a wide range of Protestant missionary societies, and so this was a major contribution to the world’s medical missionary workforce. One of the founding directors of EMMS, Dr. Peter David Handyside FRCSEd established a dispensary to serve the Irish residing in Edinburgh upon the urging of Rev. P. McMenamy. While working with students as a director of EMMS, Handyside realized that it could be beneficial to have a facility in which students could serve local residents and gain valuable clinical and pastoral experience. To this end, he established the "Cowgate Medical Mission Dispensary" in an old whisky shop in Edinburgh on 15 May 1858 The dispensary was turned over to Dr William Burns Thomson. He transformed the dispensary into the Edinburgh Medical Missionary Society’s Training Institution on 18 November 1861. The institute was located in one of the poorest spots in the city of Edinburgh in order to serve those in dire need. The institute trained the future medical missionaries for work overseas.

The Rev. Dr David Livingstone was a corresponding member of the Edinburgh Medical Missionary Society and initially served with the London Missionary Society in various parts of Africa, where he died in 1873 in what is now Zambia. Edinburgh Medical Missionary Society’s old dispensary needed to be replaced, and a memorial stone for a new building was laid by Livingstone’s father-in-law, the Rev. Dr. Robert Moffat. Thus, the Livingstone Memorial Medical Training Institute took the place of what had been the Cowgate Medical Mission Dispensary on 9 June 1877.

One eminent resident physician at the Cowgate was Dr. Robert V. Liddell, Eric Liddell’s elder brother who, after graduating from the University of Edinburgh with EMMS support, worked at the Livingstone Memorial Medical Training Institute for a year in 1924, before going to China where he was later joined by his more famous brother Eric, the Olympic Gold medalist, to work as a science teacher in a school also under the auspices of the London Missionary Society.

EMMS members founded hospitals and dispensaries throughout the world. EMMS's overseas work began in the Middle East and then spread to India, China and Malawi. Supported by EMMS, Dr. Kaloost Vartan founded the Nazareth dispensary in 1861. Later EMMS supported a dispensary in Damascus which grew into the Victoria Hospital. In 1881 a colleague of Vartan, Dr. Colin Valentine, founded an institution in Agra, Uttar Pradesh, India, to train doctors. In 1895 a university of Edinburgh graduate Dr. Neil MacVicar founded a branch hospital at Blantyre Mission in Malawi.

== EMMS in India and Nepal ==
=== History of EMMS in India ===
A Scottish missionary doctor, Dr. Colin Valentine was sponsored by EMMS to journey to India to provide aid in 1861. There, he was faced with many regulations in place that provided obstacles to medical aid. He supported Indian medical students at the Government School of Agra, and EMMS gave them grants. There, he was faced with many regulations in place that provided obstacles for medical aid. Their training proved to be instrumental in the success of Indian medical missionaries throughout the region. In 1884, the institution in Agra expanded to provide scholarships to men and women who were interested in studying medicine at the institute.

=== Operations in India ===
EMMS currently works with hospitals of Emmanuel Hospital Association (EHA). Its hospitals spread from the North to the Northeast of India. In 2025, EMMS trains vulnerable women into healthcare jobs in hard-to-staff facilities near their homes develops nurse training and hospital infrastructure and installs solar power in hospitals.

=== Operations in Nepal ===
EMMS International works with partners in Nepal including International Nepal Fellowship (INF). In 2025, EMMS International is developing rural models of palliative care in Nepal supporting vulnerable young women through healthcare qualifications helping to restore the elimination of leprosy in Nepal and responding to emergencies when they arise.

== EMMS in Malawi ==
=== History of EMMS in Malawi ===
EMMS began its mission to Malawi when one of its students, Neil MacVicar, set up the Blantyre Mission in 1895. MacVicar had grown up poor and subsisted in his studies in unheated lodgings and with five shillings a week for food. Despite this great adversity, he graduated in 1893 as the top student at Edinburgh University, having received numerous medals. In 1896, at the urging of EMMS, he oversaw the construction of a brick building that served as the dispensary in Blantyre, Malawi. He was charged with the healthcare of Malawians, and trained Malawians as assistants. He was the first European to provide such training in the region. To supplement this training, he published a set of lectures that would enable a Malawian assistant to carry out medical procedures, such as dressing wounds. MacVicar and the doctors who followed him expressed their indebtedness to the nurses and assistants. MacVicar wrote, "‘Perhaps the greatest practical development of the Victorian era, the development of modern nursing, without which neither surgery nor medicine could have achieved half their triumphs.'" Later, he wrote of how much better Malawian staff were than European staff with Malawian patients. MacVicar designed the Blantyre Mission as a model of the British teaching hospital. The hospital had two wards for males and one ward for women. There was more light in the hospital operating room than at other hospitals in the area. It contained a central heating system through an underground fire chamber. MacVicar maintained detailed records of the treatments given at the hospital. and arranged in-patient care, to avoid forcing patients to walk many miles to receive treatment each day.

=== Current operations in Malawi ===
In 2025 EMMS International, with its partners, supported palliative care patients across Malawi. It supported vulnerable women through healthcare qualifications and into jobs in hard-to-staff facilities, supported girls at risk of pregnancy to stay in school instead, installed solar power and clean water supplies in health facilities and responded to emergencies as they arose.

== Publications and publicity ==
According to John Wilkinson, "from the beginning, the [EMMS] was very publicity-conscious." In its first year, EMMS published the "Annual Report," which documents its history and activities. Shortly after, EMMS began to produce a quarterly journal called the "Occasional Paper" beginning in January, 1854. It was distributed free of charge until October 1961 when it was no longer financially viable. In 1865, "The Medical Missionary Journal" was published concerning medical missionary news. In 1871, EMMS began producing the "Quarterly Papers" that cost one pound annually. From 1966, the Annual Report and the Quarterly Papers were published in one journal called "The Healing Hand", a publication which lasted until 2022. All current EMMS International publications are now published on its website.

To supplement its publications, EMMS also drew the interest of the general public through its monthly lecture series held at No. 57 George Square and other locations. These meetings provided insight from first-hand experience of those who worked abroad.

== Promoting women in healthcare ==
From early on, EMMS founders showed an interest in promoting the role of women in healthcare at home and abroad. Dr William Burns Thomson started training nurses in the 1860s and 1870s. In 1867 one of his proteges, Elizabeth Ramage, accompanied Dr Kaloost Vartan to Nazareth. The new Nazareth Hospital (1924–present) later became a centre for training Palestinians in nursing and midwifery. EMMS Victoria Hospital (1898-1957) in Damascus similarly trained Syrians. EMMS directors such as surgeons Peter Handyside and Patrick Heron Watson helped pioneer women medical students such as Sophia Jex-Blake to get the anatomical and clinical experience through the Royal College of Surgeons Edinburgh, that the University of Edinburgh denied them. At the Surgeons Hall Riot of 1870 Handyside ensured the safe entrance and egress of the Edinburgh Seven including Jex-Blake to an anatomy session at Edinburgh’s Surgeon’s Hall when they were threatened by a mob of unruly male medical students. Once women were allowed to qualify in and practice medicine, EMMS extended its bursaries to them in 1890, and they studied at Elsie Inglis’ Edinburgh College of Medicine for Women. The first to graduate were Eleanor Montgomery and Lillie Cousins (1895). Eventually about 60 women graduated with EMMS support. In 2025 EMMS International supports vulnerable women to work in healthcare, in Nepal, India (Bihar), Malawi and Zambia, in medicine, postgraduate palliative care, diploma-level clinical work, nursing, auxiliary nursing, speech therapy, and laboratory and pharmacy.

== Fundraising ==
EMMS International is funded by a variety of sources, including government and voluntary sources.

== Structure ==
EMMS International has a board of trustees and staff and complies with all charity legislation and regulations applicable in Scotland.

== Financial information ==
EMMS International’s financial income can be found at OSCR and Companies House.
