= Conrad Schick =

German missionary, architect, model-maker and self-taught scholar (1822–1901)

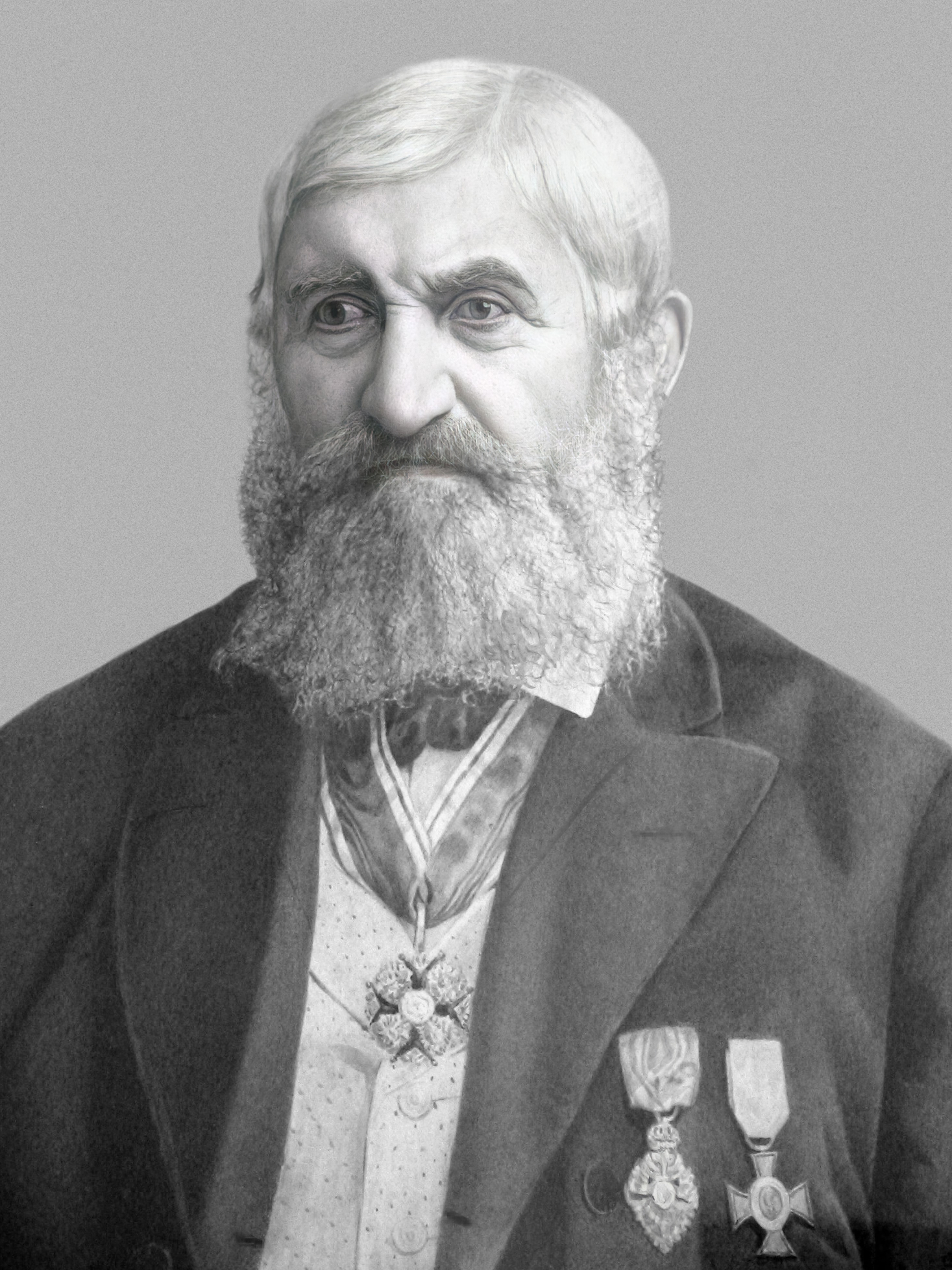
Conrad Schick (1822–1901) around 1897

Conrad Schick (b. 27 January 1822 in Bitz, Kingdom of Württemberg; d. 23 December 1901 in Jerusalem, Ottoman Empire) was an esteemed German Protestant missionary, architect, model-maker, urban planner, land surveyor, and self-taught scholar well versed in archaeology. From 1869 he bore the title of Royal Württemberg Building Councillor. Of modest farming background and trained as a locksmith, he came to the Holy Land as a missionary in 1846 by way of the Pilgrim Mission Institute of St Chrischona and remained resident there until his death. Alongside his work at the Jerusalem fraternity and at the "House of Industry" of the English Mission to the Jews, he served as building inspector for several missionary societies and as architect of the Jerusalem Municipality. His practical knowledge of the city's buildings, soil, and subsoil grew, without professional archaeological training, into a decades-long, systematic study of Jerusalem's historical topography, documented in numerous maps, in models of biblical and historical buildings, and in scholarly and popular publications. Through these remarkable achievements he became one of the central figures of Palestine research in the late nineteenth century, and was honoured with numerous honorary offices as well as academic and state distinctions.

== Biography ==
=== Early life and vocational training ===
Conrad Schick was born on the afternoon of the Third Sunday after Epiphany, 1822, on the Swabian Alb, the middle one of eleven sons of the village mayor and farmer Martin Schick (1787–1858) and his wife Anna Maria, née Blickle (1792–1863), and was baptised as a Protestant in the village church of Bitz five days later. Several of his brothers died in childhood. A sickly boy, he attended the village school from the age of six and immersed himself early in the stories of the Bible. Since the parental living room also served as the meeting room of the village council, he gathered useful impressions there even as a boy. With a half-gulden he had been given, he bought his first drawing materials; he preferred to draw houses, churches, and castles, an early harbinger of his later talent, whereas human and animal figures did not quite succeed. He showed little inclination for agricultural work but a pronounced aptitude for anything mechanical. In 1836 his childless paternal uncle, Johann Jakob Schick (1774–1852), in whose turner's workshop he liked to linger, referred him to Kullen (1787–1842), the head of the Brethren community of Korntal. Kullen regretted that the boy had not been sent to him sooner and advised him first to learn the locksmith's trade as a foundation for future mechanical and, as would prove to be the case, missionary work.

There followed a three-year apprenticeship in Korntal with the master locksmith Johann Georg Kuhn (1811–1879), during which the Christian atmosphere of the fraternity awakened in him the desire to become a missionary. His master eventually referred him to the pastor Sixt Karl Kapff (1805–1879), who encouraged his wish to become an apostle and enabled him to take Latin lessons. A nervous fever forced him to interrupt his missionary preparation; a cure with salt baths restored his health. He then took a position in Ebingen, where he trained in the making of finer instruments and in brass founding, and went on a journeyman's tour by way of Schaffhausen and Zurich to Basel, where he worked as a joiner for a firm. Doubts about his own ability to meet the demands of missionary service, above all the rigours of the preparatory training, kept him from presenting himself at once at the Basel Mission. Only in 1841 did he approach the Inspector of the Mission, Wilhelm Hoffmann (1806–1873), who knew him from Korntal and encouraged him to apply. After the Basel Missionary Society had rejected his admission, Christian Friedrich Spittler (1772–1867) offered him training at the Pilgrim Mission he had recently founded at St Chrischona near Basel. His first task there was to produce, together with the pupils, a model of the Tabernacle for classroom instruction. Schick found only in part what he had expected: the pupils were for the most part kept to manual labour, and theological instruction took place only sporadically.

When Schick raised these shortcomings, Spittler recognised in him, or so Schick later claimed, the right man for his plan to establish a fraternity house in Jerusalem. The appointment of the missionary Samuel Gobat (1799–1879), a pupil of the Basel Mission, as second Anglican-Protestant Bishop of Jerusalem made its realisation possible, since Gobat intended the planned fraternity to be the spearhead of a mission to Abyssinia. The Württemberger Johann Ferdinand Palmer (1818–1892) of Winnenden was envisaged as a fellow worker. In preparation, Schick was sent, through the mediation of Karl Friedrich Ledderhose (1806–1892), to a four-week watchmaking apprenticeship in St Georgen in the Black Forest, where in April and May 1846 he learned the manufacture of clocks, the handling of the necessary tools, and the calculation of gear wheels and movements.

=== Missionary Journey to Palestine and Early Work in Jerusalem ===
On 7 September 1846 the two left Basel and, after a hard journey by way of Milan, Venice, Trieste, and Smyrna, reached Beirut; from there an Arab sailing vessel took them to Jaffa. On 29 October 1846, after an overnight stay in the Latin monastery at Ramle, they proceeded with a Greek pilgrim caravan to Jerusalem, where they were taken in at the house of the Prussian consul Ernst Gustav Schultz (1811–1851). Schick began at once to learn Arabic, but the climate and adverse living conditions affected his health to such an extent that, after a physical collapse, he was confined to bed for weeks. On 12 November he moved with Palmer into a rented house near the Damascus Gate. Despite the difficult circumstances, they founded a fraternity, whose independence they resolutely defended against encroachments, insisting that it was a German Protestant fraternity and not an English institution. Bishop Gobat's entry into Jerusalem on 30 December 1846 gave the young mission fresh courage. At the fraternity house, orphaned Arab boys of various, though for the most part Catholic and Greek Orthodox, denominations were at first instructed in watchmaking. Enrolment was high until 1849, when most of the pupils were withdrawn out of fear of Protestant proselytising after a Jewish apprentice had been baptised.

Because Schick and Palmer eventually intended to marry, which was not possible at the Brothers' House, they left the institution in November 1850 with Spittler's consent and entered Gobat's service. Schick took over the supervision of craft training at the "House of Industry" of the "Society for Promoting Christianity among the Jews," which offered lodging and support to Jews who acknowledged Jesus as the Messiah. The proselytes admitted there received clothing, instruction, board, and lodging until their baptism and beyond, until they had completed an apprenticeship in a trade. Schick initially worked among them together with Hans Nicolayson (1803–1856) and was appointed house father in 1855. At the "House of Industry" he for the first time received a regular income and at the same time enjoyed wide-ranging freedoms.

=== Marriage and family ===
When Schick decided to get married, he sent word to Basel asking them to send him a wife. However, since quite some time had passed and he was known in Basel only as a mechanic and watchmaker, they sent him a kind but simple young woman named Caroline Amalie Schmid, who, however, did not tolerate the climate in Palestine very well. After the death of his first wife, who died in 1852 along with their first child during childbirth, Schick decided to look for a wife for himself in Germany. His search dragged on for quite some time until, during a visit to his former pastor in Ludwigsburg, he met Friederike Pauline Dobler (1826–1902), the daughter of a master tailor. She had originally intended to go to India as a missionary. After only a brief acquaintance, Schick married her on September 14, 1854, at the Ludwigsburg City Church. Of the couple's six children only three reached adulthood: Lydia (1855–1944), who in 1879 married the physician Adalbert Einsler (1848–1919), who worked at the Jerusalem leprosy hospital "Jesus Hilfe" and had converted from Catholicism to Protestantism before the marriage; Frieda (b. 1860), who in 1878 married Ludwig Schoenecke (1847–1902), an employee of the Johannes Frutiger Bank and later an independent merchant; and Anna Maria (1862–1952), who in 1883 married Franz Märker (1854–1918), a teacher at the German School in Jerusalem. When Friederike's health deteriorated, the family travelled in 1868 from Jaffa by way of Beirut, Smyrna, and Trieste to Ludwigsburg; the daughters were taken in by their grandmother. Lydia attended the girls' institute in Korntal near Stuttgart, Frieda and Anna the girls' middle school there, while Friederike sought recovery in the spa establishments of Cannstatt and Bad Boll. After she had regained her health following about a year and a half, the family returned to Jerusalem in the autumn of 1869. Shortly afterwards the city received the Prussian Crown Prince Frederick and Emperor Franz Joseph I of Austria. Schick guided both through Jerusalem and was honoured for it; moreover, both invited him to a convivial gentlemen's evening and to a banquet at the German consulate.

=== Activities as an architect, model-maker and an archaeologically versed layperson ===
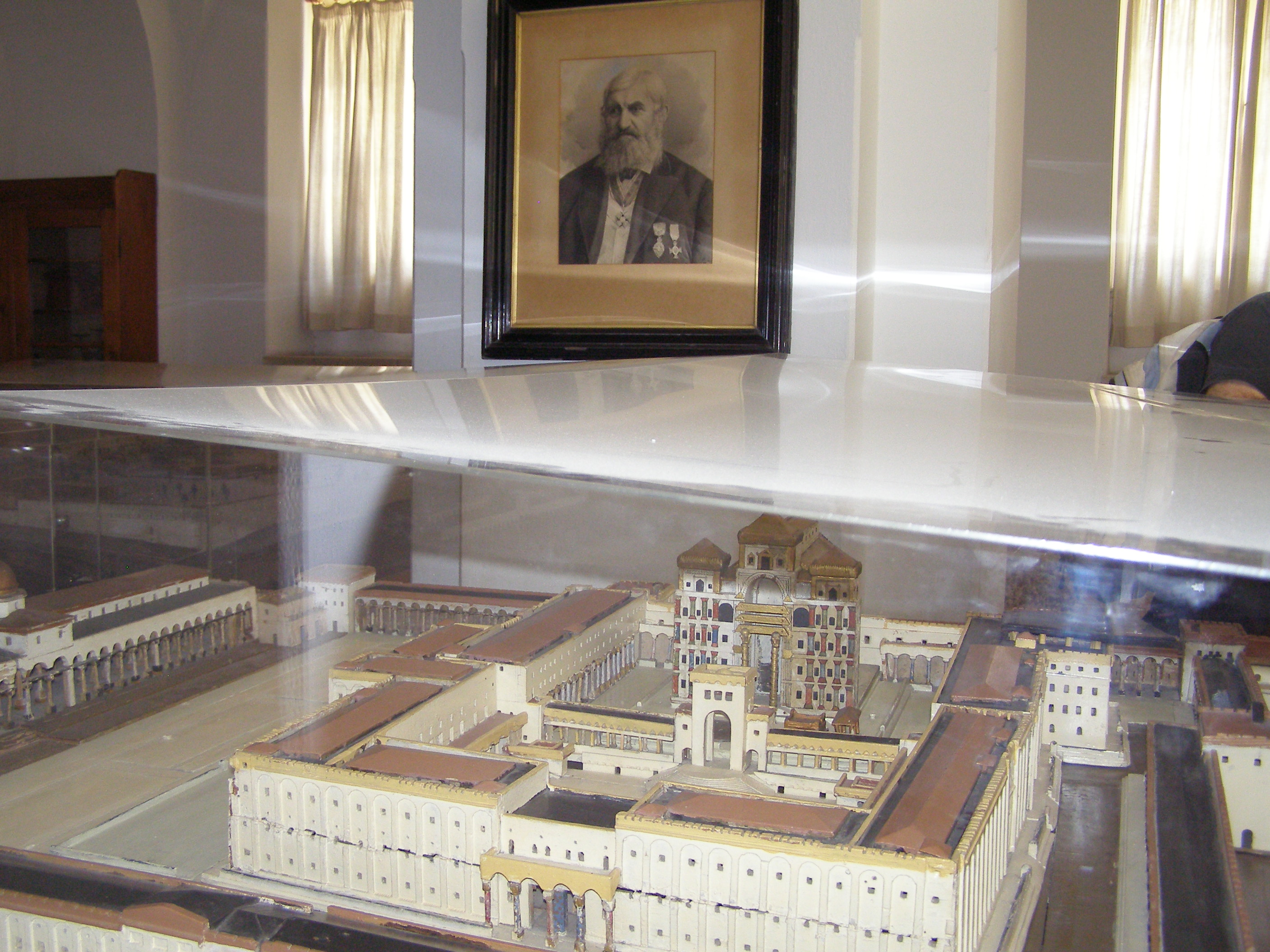
Schick's model of Herod's Temple on the Temple Mount, Schmidt's Girls College, Jerusalem, with portrait of Schick in the background

In the early 1860s, favoured by the freedoms his work at the "House of Industry" afforded him, Schick turned to a wide range of interests. He first became known through his models. In 1863 he presented in Stuttgart small wooden replicas of the Tabernacle and the Church of the Holy Sepulchre, made together with craftsmen and proselytes at the "House of Industry", for which the King of Württemberg awarded him the Grand Medal for Art and Science of the Kingdom of Württemberg. The ingeniously constructed models could be dismantled, packed, and shipped, and removable upper sections revealed the interior. The replica of the Church of the Holy Sepulchre arose in connection with a dispute over the transfer of the Khanqah building, which the Roman Church sought. The proposal met with clear opposition on the Muslim side, above all from the incumbent pasha and the community leaders, as well as from the Greeks. The pasha commissioned Schick to produce a wooden model to illustrate the local conditions to the Turkish authorities in Constantinople. The Greek Orthodox Patriarch, too, took to the idea and commissioned a further model that additionally took the adjoining buildings into account. The pasha's model, measuring 1.75 × 1.32 m and marking the areas of the individual confessions within the complex, eventually passed, through Wolff's mediation, into the private possession of the King of Württemberg. In 1873, on Ottoman commission, Schick produced for the Vienna World Exhibition models of the Dome of the Rock and of the entire Temple Mount, which summarised his studies together with cavities, substructures, and cisterns; around this time he also worked on a model of the Church of the Nativity in Bethlehem. The Temple Mount model, completed in 1885 after eight years of work, additionally allowed the Solomonic and the Herodian Temples as well as the present-day Haram esh-Sharif to be placed on top of it. In 1887 Schick published a book explaining the models. Copies of the Temple Mount model are found at various places in Jerusalem and abroad.

From 1860 Schick also developed a lively building activity: as building inspector of two missionary societies and for many years architect of the Jerusalem municipal administration, he was involved in the construction of numerous buildings. For the Kaiserswerth deaconesses he designed a two-storey hospital in the Old City in 1860 and a convalescent home on the Gottfriedshöhe in 1861; in 1863 followed the sanatorium of the London Mission to the Jews.

Among Schick’s other projects were the Talitha Kumi girls' school, whose construction began in 1866 and which was inaugurated in January 1868 (after its demolition in 1980, only its central gable remained); the Muristan Chapel, which was rebuilt in 1871; and the Jewish neighborhood of Mea Shearim, which was developed beginning in 1874 according to his plans. Schick designed the first hundred houses, a synagogue, and a mikveh. For his family, he had a spacious residence with a large inner courtyard built on Prophets Street between 1882 and 1889; the building has been owned by the Church of Sweden since 1966 and has been used by the Swedish Theological Institute since 1951. From 1885 to 1887 the new building of the leprosy asylum Jesus-Hilfe of the Moravian Church, founded in 1867, was constructed according to his plans. In 1890 he designed, together with the priest Vold es’Somajat, who had been sent to Jerusalem from Abyssinia, a round church modelled on Abyssinian churches; the connection had come about through the St Chrischona Pilgrim Mission, with which the Ethiopian emperor maintained good contacts.

Schick also devoted himself with remarkable dedication to urban archaeology, striving to compensate for his lack of formal academic training through self-study, curiosity, and perseverance. He supplemented his archaeological research with topographical and sociohistorical studies. He conducted his research primarily in collaboration with others or at least at their suggestion; as early as 1857, Philipp Wolff (1810–1894) praised Schick's extensive expertise regarding Jerusalem. In 1863 and 1864 he published studies on the route between Jerusalem and Jaffa in the periodical "Das Ausland." In 1865 he turned to the question of the location of biblical Emmaus, where, as a "neutral" Protestant, it fell to him to settle a dispute among Catholic researchers.

Since the suspicious authorities permitted no appreciable excavations in the city, he appeared at every excavation, whether for a house, a cistern, or a water reservoir, and noted what presented itself. From the end of 1865 to 1867 Schick published eleven reports in "Das Ausland," which give the impression of a disordered hodgepodge handed over to the editorial office without review: sober communications on finds and measurements, mostly with drawings but without references or scholarly apparatus, yet as primary sources often of extraordinary value. In the first of them he surveyed for Charles Wilson (1836–1905) the vaults beneath the Beth Mechkeme court building as far as the el-Burak pool and discovered the remains of the bridge arch between the Temple Mount and the Upper City, whose far-reaching significance he, through inexperience, failed to recognise. The remaining reports describe excursions into various regions of Palestine. In 1867 he published his first longer study on the route between Jaffa and Jerusalem. The collaboration with Wilson developed into a close connection with the Palestine Exploration Fund, in whose journal Schick published around 200 contributions; in all he wrote more than 400 reports and communications on archaeological, topographical, and social subjects and produced numerous maps of Jerusalem and Palestine.

He was the first to investigate the ruins of the Muristan more closely and in 1880 was involved in the discovery of the Siloam inscription in Hezekiah's Tunnel. His treatise of 1878 on the water supply of the Holy City proved of lasting value: some ninety years later Amihai Mazar still relied in places on Schick's drawings. In the mid-1870s he took part in an academic controversy over the theories of the jurist and art historian Friedrich Wilhelm Unger (1810–1876), who had argued in the 1860s that the Dome of the Rock was in truth the Church of the Holy Sepulchre erected by Emperor Constantine in the fourth century. Schick's studies extended, moreover, to the contemporary living conditions of Palestine, the history of immigration and colonisation, the region's agricultural and other products, its infrastructure, mineral resources, and natural raw materials, and thus well beyond the narrower questions of the country's history, geography, and archaeology.

As an autodidact, Schick at times overstepped with his interpretations the limits of what the archaeological evidence allowed; Wilson criticised that he occasionally failed to distinguish between what he had actually seen and what he had hoped for. Thus he interpreted a wall discovered in the Muristan as part of the city's fortifications at the time of Jesus. The German representatives did not question this judgement, and during the construction of the Church of the Redeemer (1893–1898) the foundation stone was laid on this wall, in the presence of the Emperor and with great symbolic significance. Only the excavations of the German Protestant Institute of Archaeology some seventy years later, between 1970 and 1974, showed that the wall had been built only in the Early Byzantine period, in the fourth century AD.

=== Social engagement, honours, and death ===
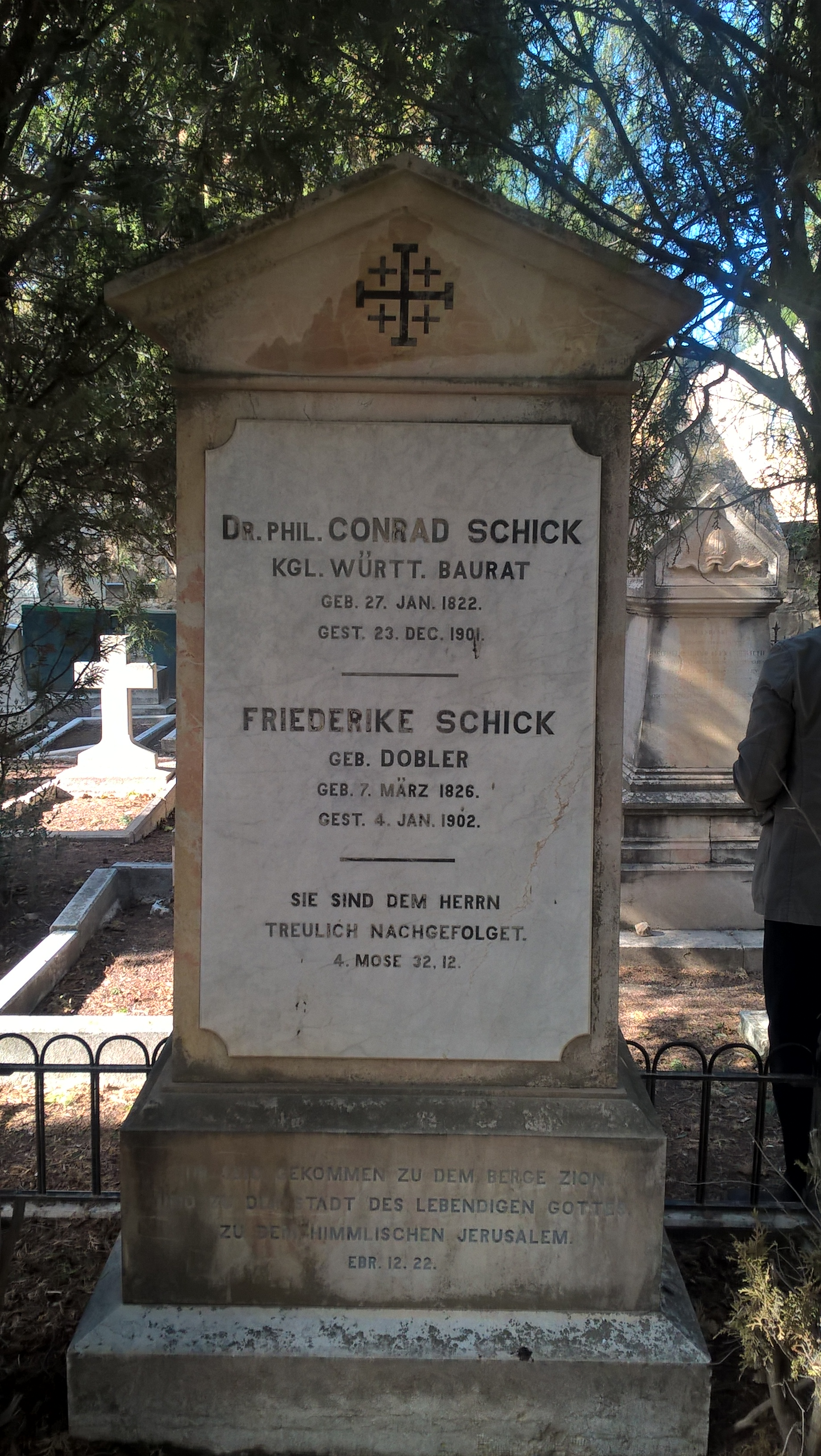
The grave of Conrad Schick and his wife in the Anglican-Prussian cemetery on Mount Zion

Alongside his work in construction and his archaeological research, Schick was involved from the 1850s onwards in a whole range of charitable, ecclesiastical and academic bodies and associations in Jerusalem, often in a leading capacity. From 1852 until his death in 1901, he was a member of the local committee and the building committee of the London Jews' Society. Furthermore, from 1860 to 1887, he served on the board of trustees of the Syrian Orphanage, the institution later known as the Schneller Schools. He was also a member of the local committee of the Johanniter Hospice in Jerusalem from 1865 to 1885 and of the board of trustees of the Jesus-Hilfe Hospital and Leprosarium from 1867 to 1901. In addition, he served as a member of the board of trustees at the Marienstift Children's Hospital from 1872 to 1899.

Schick held a prominent position in the German Association for Jerusalem, which he chaired from 1873 and of which he later became honorary president. He served on the local committee of the Church Missionary Society from 1875 to 1878 and was a member of the local committee of the Jerusalem Society in Berlin from 1880 until his death. He also played a decisive role in the institutional promotion of Palestine research: from 1878 he was a member of the Grand Committee of the German Society for the Exploration of Palestine, based in Leipzig, of which he became an honorary member in 1886; in the same year he became a corresponding member of the Palestine Exploration Fund in London. In the 1880s he was also involved in efforts to establish a German Museum of Palestine, and in 1897 he founded a Jerusalem branch of the German Society for the Exploration of Palestine.

In recognition of his contributions to the exploration of the region and his social commitment, Schick received numerous honours: in 1863, as mentioned above, the Grand Medal for Art and Science from the King of Württemberg for his wooden models; in 1869 the Knight's Cross of the Austrian Order of Franz Joseph and, in the same year, the title of Royal Württemberg Building Councillor; in 1871, the year the German Empire was founded, the Prussian Order of the Crown, 4th Class; in 1884 the Russian Order of St Stanislaus; in 1896 an honorary doctorate from the Eberhard Karls University of Tübingen; and in 1898 the Prussian Order of the Crown, 3rd Class.

Schick died, laden with honours, in the night of 24 December 1901 in Jerusalem, at the age of 81, a few hours after severe tightness in the chest had set in. On Christmas Day he was buried amid tremendous participation of foreigners and locals alike—Germans, English, Jews, and Muslims—and a Jewish local newspaper in Hebrew devoted a full-page obituary to him. His wife died a few days later, on 4 January 1902; the family finally numbered 25 souls, among them 17 grandchildren. The couple's grave is in the Anglican-Prussian cemetery on Mount Zion.

== Literature ==
- Alex Carmel, Christen als Pioniere im Heiligen Land. Ein Beitrag zur Geschichte der Pilgermission und des Wiederaufbaus Palästinas im 19. Jahrhundert. Basel, 1981.
- Alex Carmel, "Wie es zu Conrad Schicks Sendung nach Jerusalem kam." Zeitschrift des Deutschen Palästina-Vereins 99 (1983): 204–18.
- August Strobel, Conrad Schick. Ein Leben für Jerusalem. Zeugnisse über einen erkannten Auftrag (Fürth, 1988) [the biographical section corresponds to an abridged obituary of 1902].
- Haim Goren and Rehav Rubin, "Conrad Schick's Models of Jerusalem and its Monuments." Palestine Exploration Quarterly 128 (1996): 103–24.
- Haim Goren, Zieht hin und erforscht das Land. Die deutsche Palästinaforschung im 19. Jahrhundert (Göttingen, 2003): 273–92.
- Haim Goren, "Undoubtedly, the Best Connoisseur of Jerusalem in our Times: Conrad Schick as Palästina-Wissenschaftler." In Palaestina exploranda. Studien zur Erforschung Palästinas im 19. und 20. Jahrhundert anläßlich des 125jährigen Bestehens des Deutschen Vereins zur Erforschung Palästinas, ed. by Ulrich Hübner (Wiesbaden, 2006): 105–28
- Haim Goren, "Schick, Conrad." In Encyclopaedia Judaica, vol. 18 (Detroit et al., 2007): 126–27.
- Nazmi al-Jubeh, "Conrad Schick: Pioneering Architect, Archaeologist, and Historian of Nineteenth-Century Jerusalem." Jerusalem Quarterly 67 (2016): 7–18.
- Constanze Röhl, "Conrad Schick. Leben und Werk eines deutschen Architekten im Jerusalem des 19. Jahrhunderts." In Migration und Baukultur Transformation des Bauens durch individuelle und kollektive Einwanderung, ed. by Heiderose Kilper (Basel, 2019): 147–62
- Jakob Eisler, Conrad Schick. Autodidakt, Forscher, Königlich Württembergischer Baurat. Seine ersten Jahre in Palästina und Jerusalem (Stuttgart, 2024).
