= Mount Zion Cemetery, Jerusalem =

Cemetery in Jerusalem

Mount Zion Cemetery
- בית הקברות הפרוטסטנטי בהר ציון; Zionsfriedhof
- Interactive map of Mount Zion Cemetery

Details
- Established: 1848
- Location: Aravna haYevusi No. 3, Mount Zion, Jerusalem (access through Jerusalem University College campus)
- Coordinates: 31.7704°N 35.2281°E
- Type: Protestant cemetery Anglican, Lutheran, and Presbyterian
- Owned by: Church Missionary Trust Association Ltd., London
- Find a Grave: Mount Zion Cemetery

The Protestant Mount Zion Cemetery (a.k.a., Jerusalem Mount Zion Protestant Cemetery, German: Zionsfriedhof; Hebrew: בית הקברות הפרוטסטנטי בהר ציון) on Mount Zion in Jerusalem, is a cemetery owned by the Anglican Church Missionary Trust Association Ltd., London, represented by the Episcopal Church in Jerusalem and the Middle East. In 1848 Samuel Gobat, Bishop of Jerusalem, opened the cemetery and dedicated it as ecumenical graveyard for congregants of Anglican, Lutheran, Reformed (Calvinist) and old Catholic faith. Since its original beneficiary, the Bishopric of Jerusalem was maintained as a joint venture of the Anglican Church of England and the Evangelical Church in Prussia, a united Protestant Landeskirche of Lutheran and Reformed congregations, until 1886, the Jerusalem Lutheran congregation preserved a right to bury congregants there also after the Jerusalem Bishopric had become a solely Anglican diocese.

== Location ==
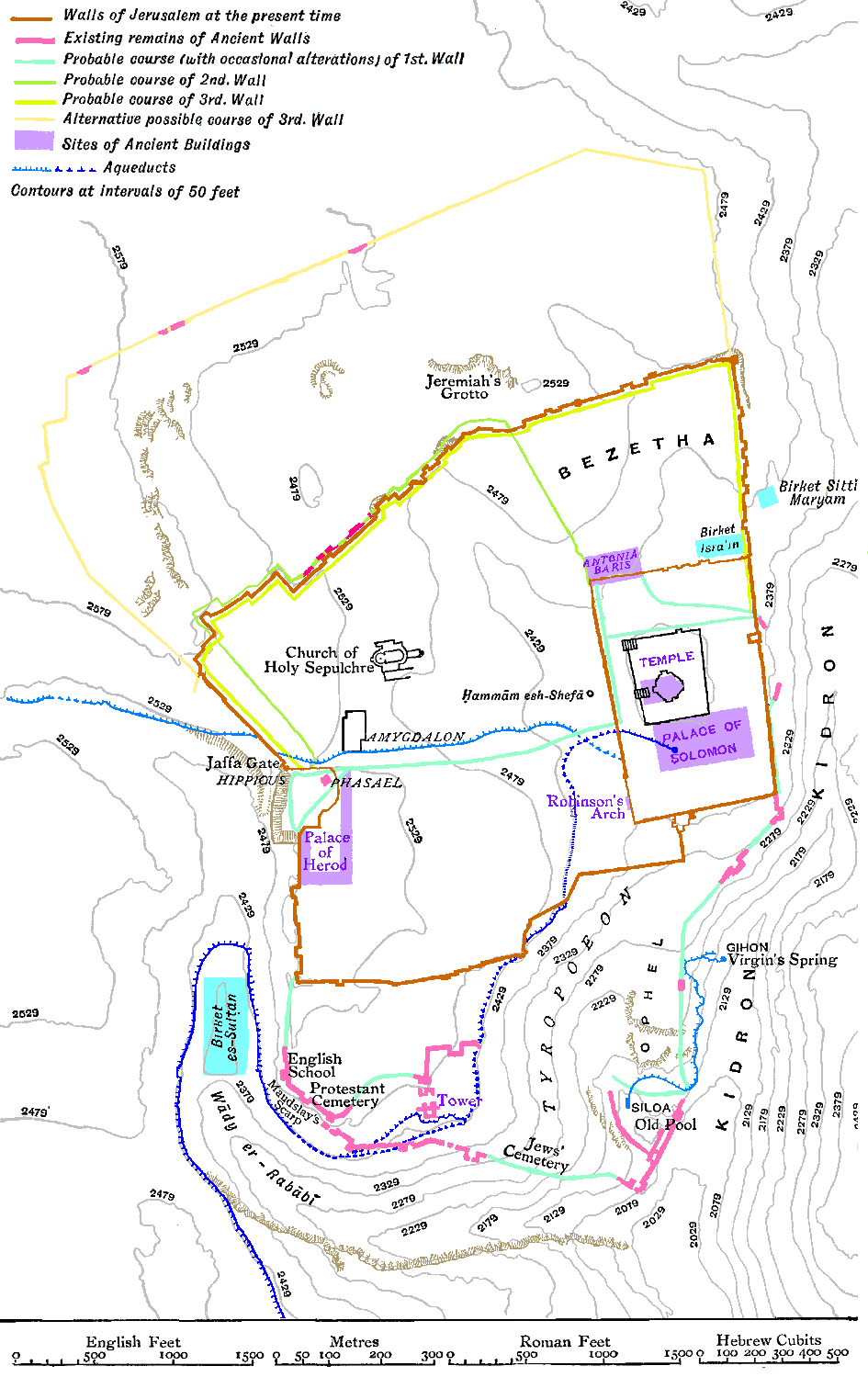
The Old City of Jerusalem with the Protestant Mount Zion Cemetery south of the city walls (close to remnants of former walls in rose colour).

The cemetery is located on the southwestern slope of Mount Zion in Jerusalem, southerly surrounded by the street Ma'alei haShalom (מעלי השלום). Mount Zion Cemetery is reached passing the site of the former Bishop Gobat School, since 1967 housing the Jerusalem University College, founded as American Institute of Holy Land Studies in 1957. ּBetween 1948 and 1967 the congregations using the cemetery, with most of their congregants living in then East Jerusalem, had very complicated access to the cemetery then located in what was West Jerusalem. So in those years a further ecumenical Protestant cemetery in Beit Safafa, Jarmaleh Cemetery, was opened on the road to Gush Etzion opposite the Tantur Ecumenical Institute for Theological Studies.

== History ==
=== Mamilla Pool ===
"Early attempts were already made in 1839 by John Nicolayson to acquire some land for a London Society cemetery site in Jerusalem. In June of that year he reported that, with the collaboration of Vice-Consul Young, he had located a suitable plot of land on Mount Zion that would meet this need, but that he had postponed closing the deal until matters were clarified about land acquired earlier for residential construction."

However, British Vice-Consul William Tanner Young then succeeded to acquire another site for the cemetery: "It is a Parallelogram of 156 feet (48 m) long and 60 feet (18 m) broad – It is 335 paces West of the Jaffa Gate and 182 paces East of that Turkish Burial-ground which is in the vicinity of the Upper Pool of Gihon, North West of the [Old] City."

"He later requested and received approval from the Foreign Office in London to build walls around the site. Among those buried in this first cemetery were Missionary Ferdinand Christian Ewald’s wife, Mary Ann (b. 1819), in January 1844 and Bishop Alexander in December 1845. However, because of the proximity to the Muslim cemetery and all the problems this entailed, the small British community in the city was forced to find a new site. In January 1844, during negotiations with Constantinople about the firman for building the [Christ] church, Nicolayson also asked the Sublime Porte for a permit to buy a plot of land for a cemetery on Mount Zion outside the city walls, where other Christian burial grounds were situated." The other Christian burial grounds on Mount Zion are an Armenian, a Greek Orthodox and the Roman Catholic Franciscan cemetery, the latter containing also the grave of Oskar Schindler.

=== Mount Zion ===
"Only in spring of 1848 did the British consul general in Constantinople and his colleague in Jerusalem,[ James Finn,] receive a firman to purchase a cemetery plot for the Protestant community." Prepared by Nicolayson, later buried there, and with the support of Hugh Rose, British consul-general for Syria, and the Mutasarrıf of Jerusalem, Zarif Pasha, Bishop Gobat acquired the tract of land on Mount Zion in the same year, paying £ 350 (= 4,200 French francs) for the land, its enclosure and levelling. Gobat financed the expenses with private funds earlier donated by Britons, Germans and Swiss, of which by December the British Government recovered £100 and later private British donators another £46.2.0, while Prussians did not specifically contribute to the project at that time. Mount Zion Cemetery replaced the old cemetery West of Jaffa Gate. So Gobat transferred the graves from there to the new cemetery on Mount Zion. By the end of November 1848 it was completely enclosed by a wall.

Between early 1850 and September 1852 Gustav Thiel (1825–1907) and his wife Maria Katharina Großsteinbeck (1826–1862) were employed as gardeners and guards of Mount Zion Cemetery at an annual income of 75 taler. They lived in a house directly at the cemetery and improved their livelihood with cows and other livestock. Jerusalemites of all background took a fancy to their European style butter, and other dairy products they produced. So their house outside the city walls attracted visitors who bought and also immediately consumed at their kind of an inn. After they quit their post Maria Katharina's brother Friedrich Wilhelm Großsteinbeck (1821–1858) succeeded them. However, Consul Finn prompted his dismissal after half a year in 1853.

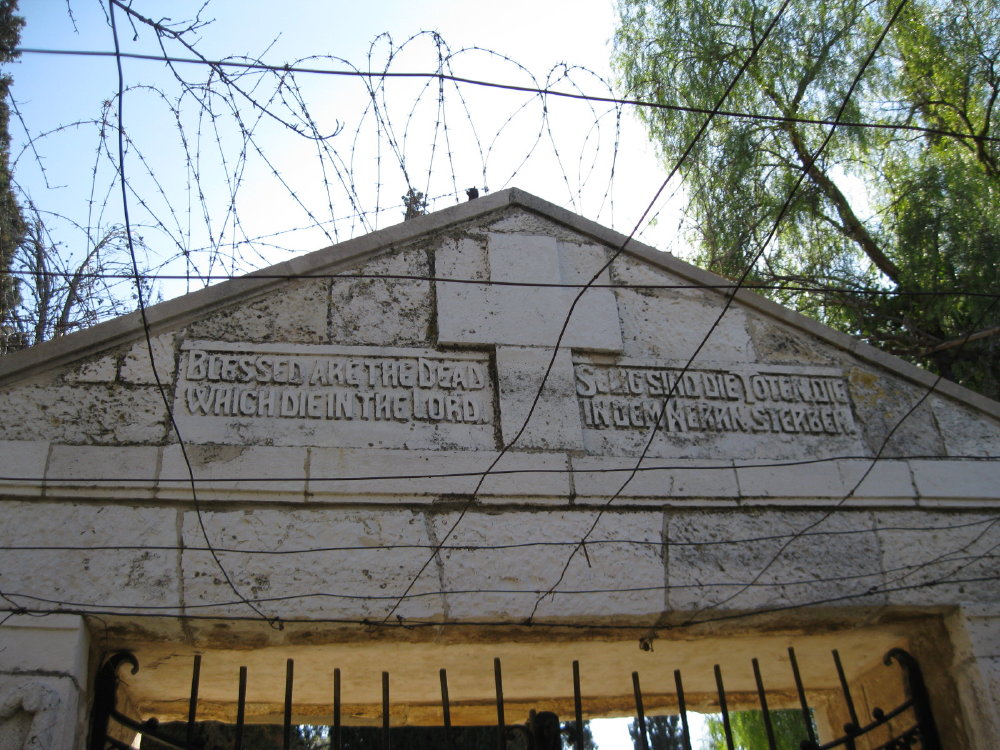
Tympanon of the lychgate to the cemetery.

In 1853 Gobat separated a part of the cemetery, which had not yet been used for burials, and moved the Bishop Gobat School (Bischof-Gobat-Schule; est. 1847, erected between 1853 and 1856 on that site) thereto, taken over by the Church Missionary Society (CMS) in 1877. The actual burial ground was then demarked by a new wall with a lychgate separating it from the school ground and garden. Therefore, the cemetery has no direct access to a street, but is reached passing the site of the school. However, in order to enlarge the burial ground again, once a shortage of gravesites would occur, Gobat – on the occasion of separating the school ground from the cemetery – recorded a pursuant clause protocolled by the British consulate.

Consul-General Georg Friedrich August von Alten (1815–1882) aimed at dissolving the Anglican-Protestant ecumenical cemeterial community, however, the German Foreign Office and Bishop Gobat opposed him, the latter even threatening to resign if this cemeterial separation would lead to finally cancel the joint bishopric. Gobat assured that he did not and was not intended to consecrate the cemetery following Anglican rite, on which grounds non-Anglicans could be excluded from being buried. Furthermore, a bill had been entered to Westminster parliament to generally open Anglican consecrated cemeteries for believers of other Protestant denominations.

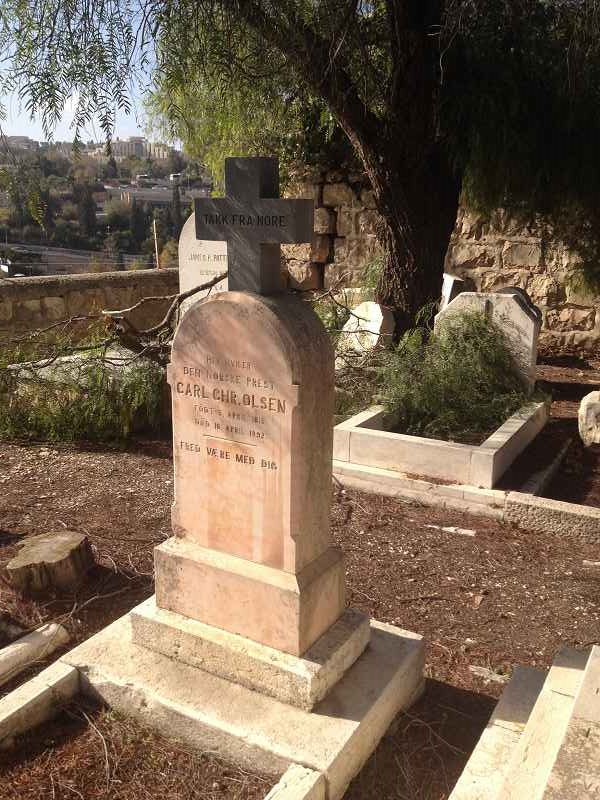
Grave of Carl Christian Olsen (1815–1892), formerly pastor at the Nore Stave Church, Norway

Alten's successor Thankmar von Münchhausen (1835–1909) instigated Gobat to execute a formal deed of foundation of the cemetery, issued on 18 September 1874, dedicating Mount Zion Cemetery for the burials of Anglicans and congregants of the Protestant churches of Augsburg (Lutheran), Helvetic (Reformed) and Utrecht Union (old Catholic) Confession. Thus Münchhausen considered Alten's concerns and objections against the joint cemetery to be obsolete and ended any attempt to dissolve the cemeterial ecumenical community.

Furthermore, the deed states that the site had been bought using monies of the bishop, while it claims that the British government funds were used to actually prepare the site as a cemetery (levelling and enclosure). This formulation obviously was meant to forestall claims, that the cemetery were to be exclusively owned by the Anglican diocese because its purchase were financed by British funds.

In 1883, while negotiating the succession of the late Bishop Joseph Barclay, the Prussian Minister of Cult and Education, Gustav von Goßler (1838–1902), in charge of the Evangelical State Church of Prussia's older Provinces, relaunched the cemeterial issue in order to institutionalise the cemeterial community. He proposed to either reach equal rights as to Mount Zion Cemetery for both sides or to legally divide the cemetery. Generally Goßler suggested to establish an easement on the site of the Bishop Gobat School as to free access to the cemetery. His proposals remained unrealised.

With the dissolution of the contract on the joint bishopric in 1886 diplomatic notes were exchanged confirming the status quo ante of the cemetery with its prior ambiguities. So technically the cemetery continued to be used and administered by the now purely English Anglican Diocese of Jerusalem and the Evangelical Jerusalem's Foundation, represented by the pastor of Jerusalem's Evangelical congregation of German language (ranked provost at Redeeemer Church since 1898).

In 1890 the Bishop Gobat School intended to acquire the unused reserve land of the cemetery, retained by Gobat in 1853 for its extension. In order to compensate for this loss a tract of land adjacent to the area already used for burials was to be purchased. The Evangelical congregation was asked to contribute a third of the incurred cost.

George Francis Popham Blyth, Anglican bishop of Jerusalem between 1887 and 1914, announced to consecrate the extended cemetery following the Anglican rite. This aroused again concerns of the Evangelical Protestants whether this would not exclude them from burying there, and put again the separation of the joint cemetery on the agenda. Carl Schlicht (1855–1930), then Evangelical pastor in Jerusalem, however, came out in favour of the continued cemeterial community and Blyth assured, an Anglican consecration would not exclude non-Anglicans from being buried.

On 13 October 1892 Blyth unilaterally donated most of the reserve land to the Bishop Gobat School, issuing a deed of donation, and added the remainder to the cemetery. He informed Pastor Schlicht about this act on the 21st of the same month and asked his consent. Schlicht presented the sake to the Evangelical Jerusalem's Foundation in Berlin and recommended to agree.

Before a formal consent arrived in Jerusalem, Rev. Johannes Zeller (1830–1902), Gobat's son-in-law and leader of Bishop Gobat School, started construction works on the land. This fait accompli incited Schlicht to formally protest at Blyth, claiming condominial property for the Evangelical Protestants. So Blyth stopped the works, however, stating: "The German [Protestant] community will always be most welcome to the privileges of interment which they hitherto enjoyed: but I have no knowledge of 'the German protestants' being 'proprietors of the ground'. The Anglican Bishop is the sole Trustee."

In consequence the Evangelical Jerusalem's Foundation offered its agreement to ceding reserve land to the Bishop Gobat School, however, asking if this could be compensated. So consul-general Paul von Tischendorf – mediated by Johannes Zeller – arranged the accord that the Church Missionary Society would pay a compensation, however, Bishop Blyth, who maintained an uneasy relationship with Zeller, opposed that, so the reserve land remained with the cemetery.

After Pastor Paul Hoppe had succeeded Schlicht in 1895 Bishop Blyth unilaterally issued cemetery rules including a scale of charges and fees in order to finance the maintenance of the cemetery and pay a superintendent (inspector) for the burial ground, with copies sent to Hoppe on 16 January 1896. This improvement was very welcome to the Evangelical congregation, since the cemetery had had no orderly revenues so far. Henri Baldensperger (1823–1896), employed at Bishop Gobat School, had volunteered as gravedigger. Blyth employed Eno G. Hensman as inspector to succeed Baldensperger and to guard the cemetery. So Hoppe expressed the agreement of the Evangelical congregation but remarked that cemetery rules applying for both congregations should be decided upon by both of them.

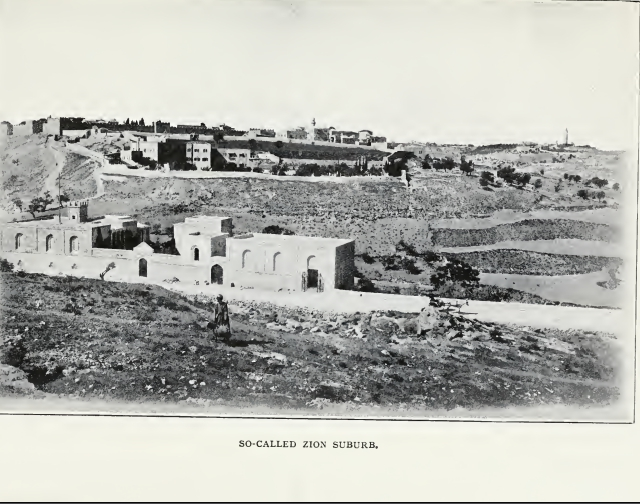
In the centre of Mount Zion: Bishop Gobat School (left) and Mount Zion Cemetery (centre right), view in 1903.

On 24 October 1902 Blyth informed that with only 30 remaining empty cemetery plots it would be time for both congregations to search for new cemeteries, separate ones for each congregation. The Evangelical congregation answered, referring to the still existing reserve land, there would be no need for action. So in 1903 the Church Missionary Society again announced its interest in the reserve land, adjacent to Bishop Gobat School, and offered to acquire in return for the reserve land an even bigger tract of land, southerly adjacent to the existing cemetery. Hoppe, since 1898 elevated to the rank of provost, agreed and so on 25 January 1904 Blyth convened the two consuls, John Dickson (1847–1906) and Edmund Schmidt (1855–1916), both later buried in the cemetery, two representatives of the CMS, a pastor of the London Society for Promoting Christianity Among the Jews (LJS), and Hoppe.

When Provost Wilhelm Bussmann, who had succeeded Hoppe in 1904, took the latter's seat in the ongoing negotiations, he proposed to legally divide the cemetery extension among the two congregations. This was opposed by Blyth, who offered in return an institutionalised joint administration and usufruct for both congregations. This would clear the long disputed relation of the Evangelical congregation to the cemetery and was thus most acceptable to them. Since the extension, which the CMS was to buy, measured a four times bigger area than the reserve land to be ceded, the parties agreed upon contributing to the purchase price.

On 4 June 1904 Blyth, Rev. Brown (Christ Church, Jerusalem), Bussmann, Dickson, Schmidt and H. Sykes (CMS) signed the protocol determining the purchase, obliging the British and German governments to provide each for a quarter of the price amounting altogether to 1,440 Napoléons d’or (= 28,800 Francs of the Latin Monetary Union, or = £1,152). The CMS would defray the other half of the price. The Evangelical Jerusalem's Foundation and William II, German Emperor, subscribed each for 180 Napoléons d’or, thus covering the German share. The cession of the reserve land had been negotiated by a bipartite mixed body.

So in November 1905 Bussmann proposed to institutionalise the administration and financing of the burial ground by a statute of Mount Zion Cemetery, which met consensual agreement, so that the mixed body executed the statute on 25 November 1905. The statute (German: Statut für die Verwaltung des Protestantischen Zionsfriedhofs in Jerusalem) established the burial board (German: Friedhofskomitee; for its composition see board of cemetery), equally representing both sides.

Both parties could freely bury the deceased. In 1906 the Syrian Orphanage in Jerusalem contributed with 75 Napoléons d'or to the purchase, while Bertha von Braun, the widow of Friedrich von Braun (1850–1904), who after his sudden death had been buried on the cemetery on 31 May 1904, donated another 100 Napoléons d’or, while the Anglican side was still behind with its payments. In 1907 Bertha von Braun donated another ℳ 5,000 (= 6,250 Francs; = £250) for the purposes of the cemetery.

Eventual deficits were to be halved among the parties, and it turned out that the stipulated burial fees did not cover the running expenses for inspector and maintenance. Because deficits repeated the burial board decided to collect once a year alms in favour of the cemetery in both congregations, starting on Sunday 24 November 1912, and then annually on the 25th Sunday after Trinity Sunday.

=== During the World Wars and the British mandate ===
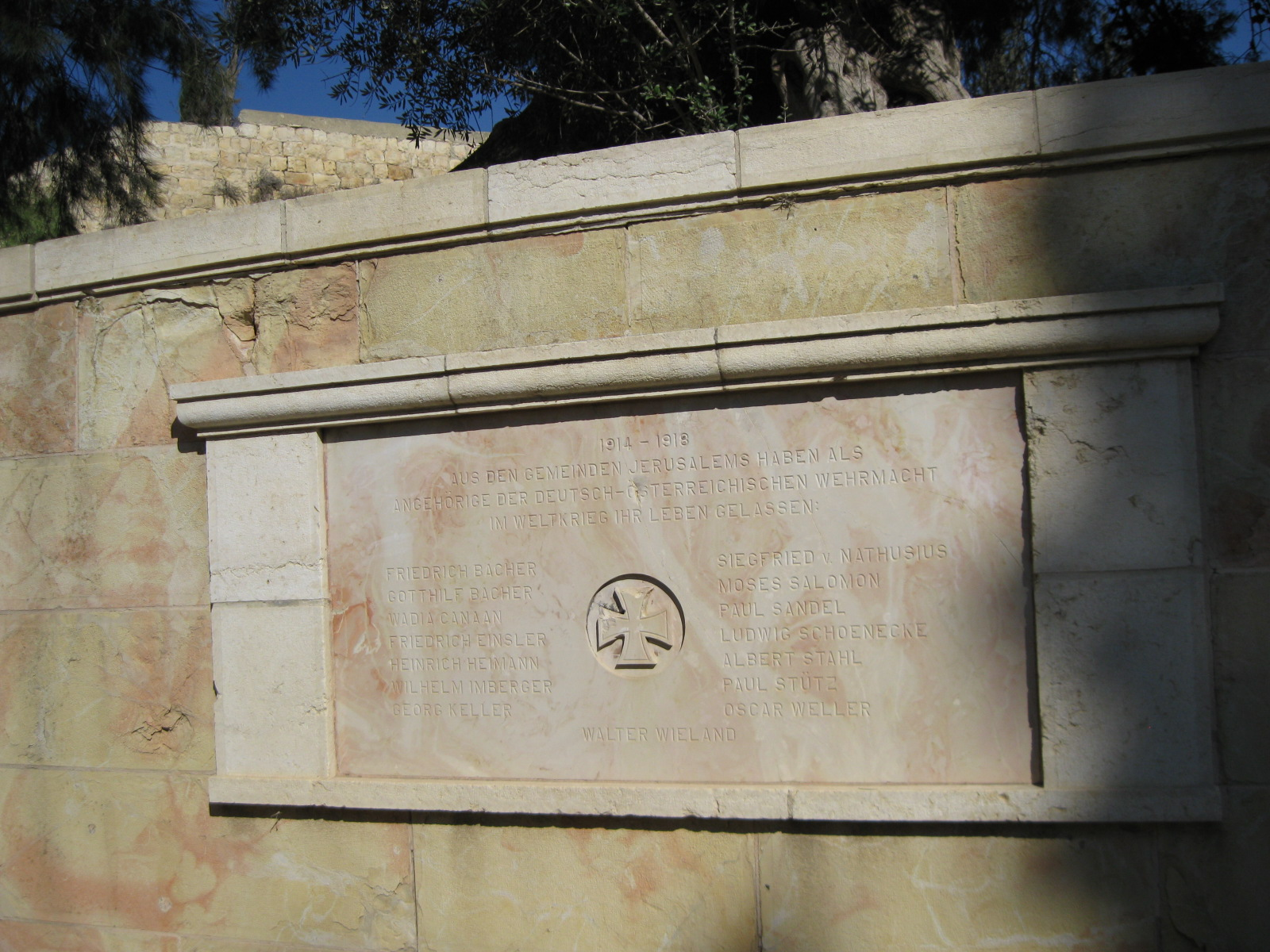
Memorial listing the names of the Jerusalemites of all faiths killed in WWI fighting in the German or Austro-Hungarian forces.

Between 1914 and 1917, during World War I, the Sublime Porte expelled Britons as enemy aliens from the Ottoman Empire, thus leaving the joint administration of Mount Zion Cemetery to the Evangelical Protestants of German nationality. Until January 1917 the German Imperial Army laid out a section of the cemetery as a non-denominational war cemetery for Austro-Hungarian (5), British (2) and German soldiers (11) of all religious denominations killed in action in the battles close to Jerusalem since 1916 and retrieved by the German medical corps. After the British capture of Jerusalem on 9 December 1917 the British army also buried its soldiers on Mount Zion Cemetery, before the separate Jerusalem War Cemetery was inaugurated on Mount Scopus in February 1918. A total of 104 British soldiers were buried here, of which 100 were later reburied at the War Cemetery, although four who died between the Armistice of 11 November 1918 and the end of Imperial War Graves Commission registration in August 1921 remained maintained there.

On 26 July 1921 Bishop Rennie MacInnes had convened the burial board and only two Evangelical representatives could take part, due to the flight or the expulsion of many German citizens from the Holy Land by the British Occupied Enemy Territory Administration (OETA). Gustaf Dalman, director of the German Protestant Institute of Archaeology and representing the expelled Provost Friedrich Jeremias (1868–1945), presented the annual financial statements for the years of 1914 to 1917, when Britons could not participate in the joint board. The CMS was partially still in arrears with its half of the purchase price and the burial board had debts with Deutsche Palästina-Bank, which was in the process of liquidation after the expropriation of German property abroad for war reparations to the World War I allies (except the Russian Empire's successor the Soviet Union).

Dalman's successor Provost Albrecht Alt participated in the board's continued settlement of the cemetery debts. In order to settle them Jerusalem's Evangelical congregation of German language stepped in, which netted its holdings of similar amount with the afore-mentioned bank with the cemetery's debts, thus defraying its share in the debt amortisation. The prior military conflict and the German defeat did not impair the joint administration of the cemetery. To the opposite, as Alt's successor Hans Wilhelm Hertzberg described, the Anglican clergy and missionaries socialised with their Evangelical counterparts in an overly friendly way. In 1924 all the German seats in the burial board were staffed again. In the annual report season 1925/26 Provost Hertzberg initiated that the burial board bought a hearse.

Due to the altered political situation in Palestine with the League of Nations mandate for Britain the two parties revised the cemetery statute in 1929, replacing the British consul by the Deputy Jerusalem District Commissioner, further increasing the burial fees and introducing limited tenures on grave sites, in order to forestall a run out of space for new burials in the future. In 1932 Provost Ernst Rhein (1885–1969) estimated that with the then number of annual burials the cemetery would reach its maximal capacity in 1939. So the burial board started planning for a new cemetery.

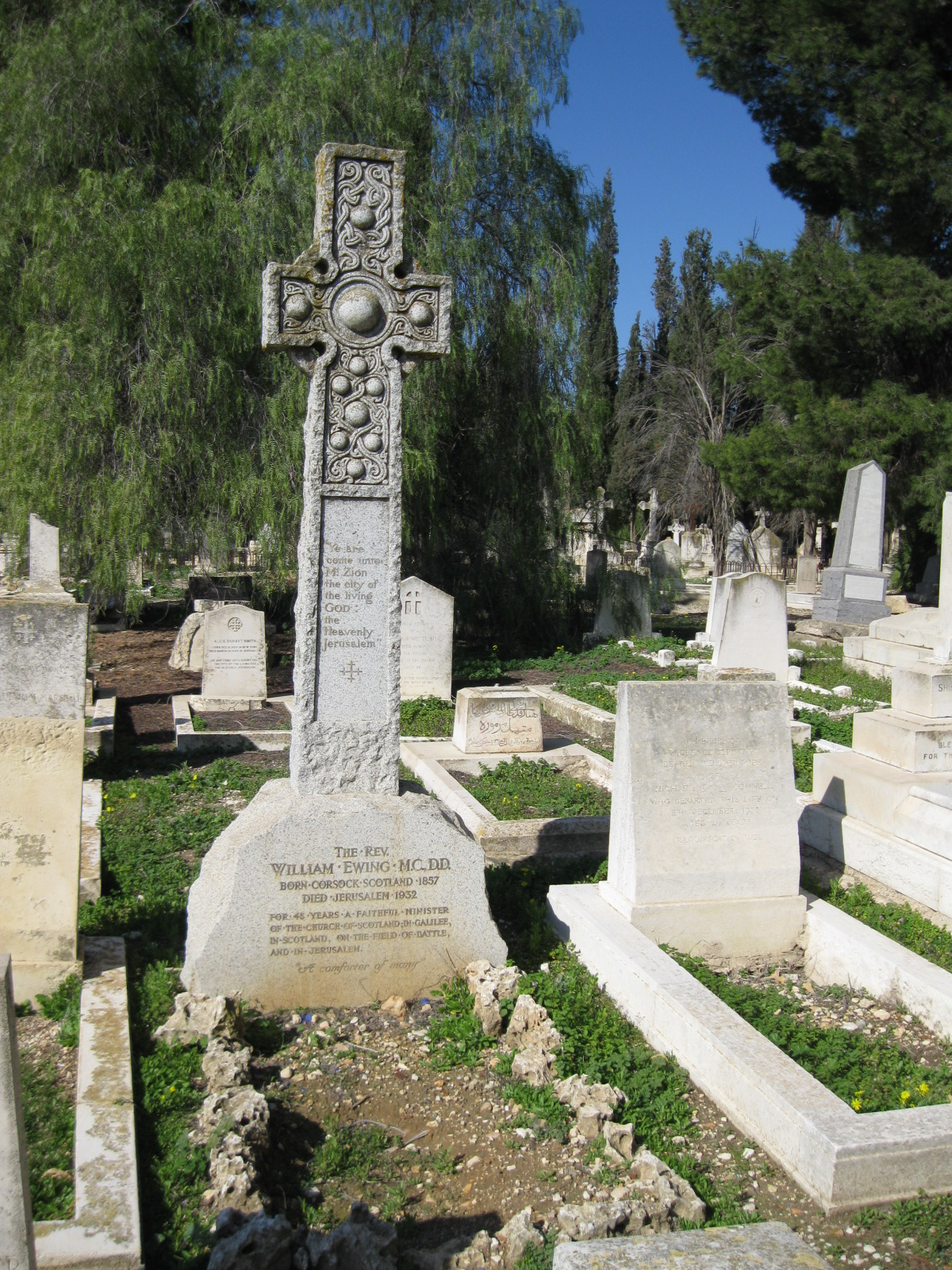
Grave of William Ewing (1857–1932), Scottish military chaplain and author

The mandate government addressed the burial board with the request, to allow them also burying members of government authorities and armed forces, who had not been Anglicans or Evangelical Protestants. The growing number of British casualties killed in service for the mandate government by anti-British terrorists became a rising problem for the government. The congregation of Presbyterian Church of Scotland indicated its interest to join the cemeterial community.

In 1933 Weston Henry Stewart, Archdeacon for Palestine, Syria and Trans-Jordan between 1926 and 1943, suggested to acquire land together with the mandate government for a new municipal cemetery on Mount Scopus next to the British Jerusalem War Cemetery, allowing each different congregation to use a specific section for its burials. If the mandate government was not to be gained for this project, the burial board should establish there a new Protestant cemetery, offering also the Scottish Presbyterians to join the burial board. Due to the shortage of space the Evangelical board members asked to deny the mandate government its request to bury also non-members of the two congregations on Mount Zion cemetery, and welcomed a new Protestant cemetery including the Presbyterians.

The Evangelical board members proposed that each congregation should contribute to the purchase price of approximately Palestine-£ 4,500 (at par with the British £) according to its expected share in the overall burials. This objection was most probably advanced because of their shortage of locally achievable funds combined with the Nazi dictatorship in Germany only very reluctantly allowing German missions to buy foreign exchange for mostly inconvertible reichsmarks (ℛℳ).

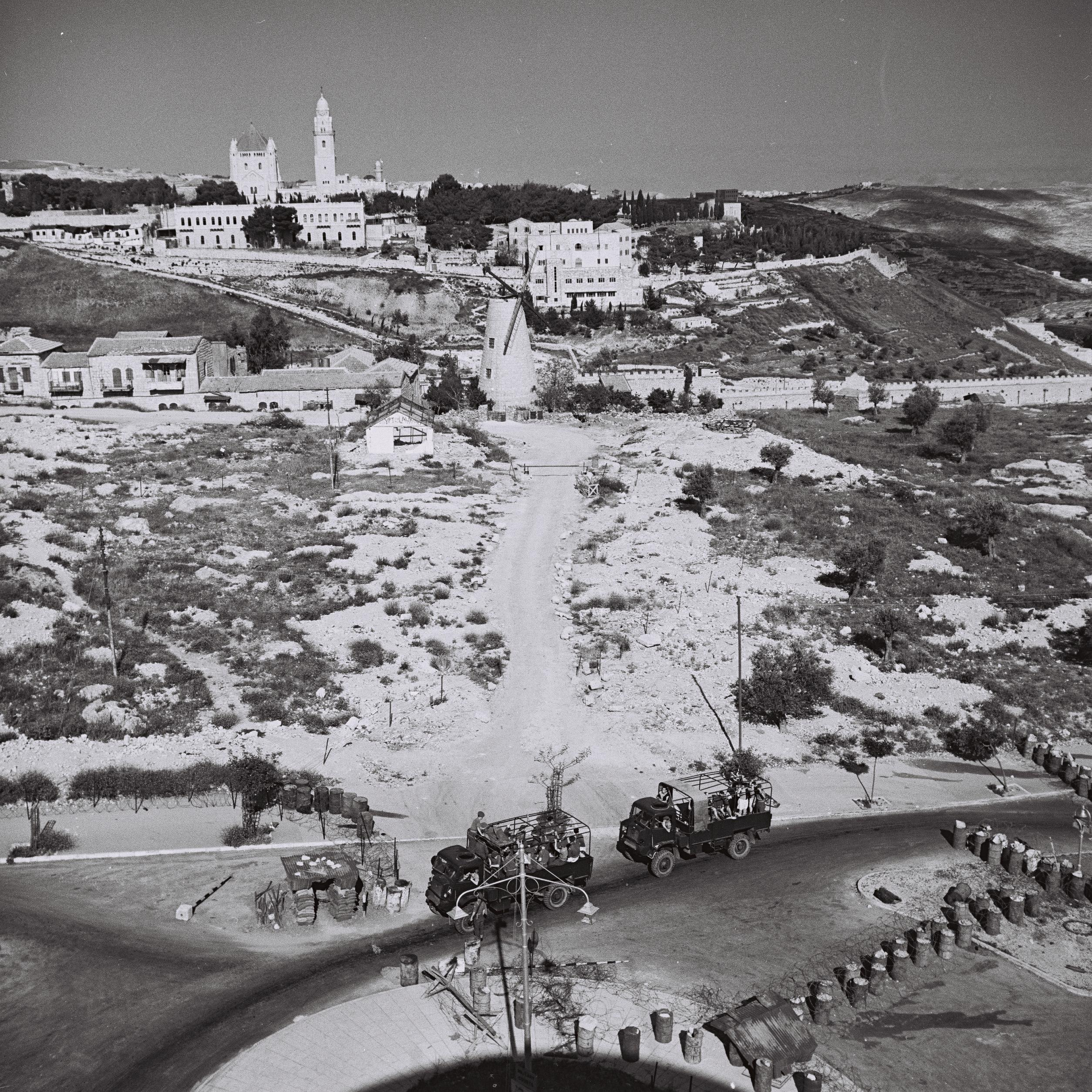
Montefiore Windmill against the background of Mount Zion with Bishop Gobat School and Cemetery with its extension of 1904 (indicated by the bright protruding wall, upper centre right; photo of 1 May 1948)

The Evangelical Protestants wanted to keep their equal representation on the burial board, unless the Presbyterians would join, and furthermore also the Arabic Anglican and Lutheran congregations, so that a quinquepartite board would become necessary. The burial board planned to register as legal entity in order to get the cemetery assigned as property of that entity. The new law established under British mandate provided for legal entities as proprietors of real estate. However, until 1936 the purchase of a new cemetery did not progress.

The Evangelical congregation of German language feared to lose its equal say and therefore proposed to form two burial boards, one like the then existing bipartite for Mount Zion Cemetery and one quinquepartite for the new Protestant cemetery. The Anglican representatives, however, preferred a single quinquepartite board, now called board of cemetery, for both cemeteries.

On 20 January 1938 Archdeacon Stewart assured Provost Rhein that the Anglican and Evangelical rights in Mount Zion Cemetery would remain untouched also under the board of cemetery enlarged by representatives of Scottish Presbyterians and Arab Protestants. In March 1938 the burial board negotiated with the Greek Orthodox patriarchate on the purchase of a tract of land near the Mar Elias Monastery.

Since Germany started the Second World War in 1939 the Anglicans had to maintain the cemetery alone, because the Evangelical seats on the board remained vacant, since most of the Christian Germans were interned in Bethlehem in Galilee, Waldheim and Wilhelma as enemy aliens by the British mandate government by mid-1940. After the Second World War anti-British terrorism in Palestine strengthened again entailing the burials of the casualties also on Mount Zion Cemetery. There are Commonwealth war graves of 73 officers of the Palestine Police Force.

=== From the foundation of Israel until the Six-Day War ===
The 1947–1949 Palestine war brought about the partitioning of Jerusalem with Mount Zion Cemetery being located in the territory of Israel. The number of Evangelical Germans had severely shrunk due to emigration and relocation from Mandate Palestine in the years between 1939 and 1948. Also the number of Anglicans had sharply decreased with the withdrawal of the Britons until 1948. While the remaining Anglican Britons continued to live in Jordanian East Jerusalem and Israeli West Jerusalem, Evangelical Germans lived only in East Jerusalem after the last 50 Gentile Germans had been expelled from Israel until 1950, among them the last two deaconesses running Jerusalem's Unity of the Brethren lepers' hospital "Jesushilfe" (today's Hansen House, Talbiya).

Between 1948 and 1967, the Evangelical congregation buried most of its deceased on the Lutheran cemetery of the Bethlehem Arab Lutheran congregation. On 4 August 1953, the Royal Jordanian authorities registered the land bought at Mar Elias Monastery as property of the Society of the Jarmaleh Cemetery. East Jerusalem's Anglicans, Lutherans and Presbyterians then used Jarmaleh Cemetery. In March 1954 Provost Joachim Weigelt assumed office at Redeemer Church, Jerusalem, succeeding Johannes Doering, whose time in office included a British internment in Palestine between end of May 1940 and summer 1945. The board of cemetery convened again including Weigelt as representative of the Evangelical congregation.

The board resumed its negotiations on a revision of the cemetery statutes as started in the 1930s. On 13 February 1962, the board of cemetery, with, among others, Archbishop Angus Campbell MacInnes and Provost Carl Malsch (1916–2001), decided the new Statutes of the Jarmale Cemetery Board. "The Board shall be responsible for the proper care and maintenance of the Jarmale Cemetery and of the British-German cemetery on Mount Zion." The board of cemetery in its new composition held regular meetings until 1994, then again once in June 1998 and resumed regular meetings in September 2007.

The Evangelical Lutheran Church in Jordan (and the Holy Land) (name extension as of 2005), which had been established and royally recognised in 1959, was not represented on the board, since the new statutes based on a draft already prepared before 1959. Therefore, the Jarmaleh Cemetery Board formed a committee to discuss Malsch's proposal to accept the new church body in the joint administration of the cemetery. Canon Smith declared for the Anglican side their opposition to the admission of the Jordanian Lutheran Church.

Malsch proposed to the Evangelical Jerusalem's Foundation to end the cemeterial condominium and to sell the inaccessible Mount Zion Cemetery, both of which the foundation clearly rejected in order to maintain the ecumenical cooperation and the long tradition of this burial ground. The new Provost Hansgeorg Köhler championed this opinion. So negotiations concentrated on the proposal to form two separate subcommittees for each of the cemeteries, with the option to include the Arab Lutherans in the administrations of Jarmaleh Cemetery.

=== From the Six-Day War until 2007 ===
The discussion on a participation of the Arab Lutherans had not been concluded when the Israeli conquest of East Jerusalem in the Six-Day War ended the division of Jerusalem. So with free access by all Jerusalem congregants the Commonwealth War Graves Commission took the effort to renovate and repair Mount Zion Cemetery in 1968. Since then the board of cemetery resumed burying on Mount Zion Cemetery.

In 1977 the board of cemetery allowed Bargil Pixner of the Hagia Maria Sion Abbey to carry out archeological excavations on Mount Zion Protestant Cemetery searching for the Essene Gateway mentioned by Flavius Josephus. On 28 April 1981 the board assessed that Mount Zion Cemetery were in a good condition, the ongoing excavations, leaving the enclosing walls damaged, left their traces on the cemetery and exposed it to vandalism. In March 1983 the German embassy offered to contribute in an eventual renovation. In 1986 several newspapers published articles and letters to the editors expressing concerns because of the decay of the cemetery. In early 1986 the Mayor of Jerusalem, Teddy Kollek, uttered his worries and offered the aid of the City of Jerusalem for the preservation of the cemetery. In 1986 the board commissioned an Israeli architectural firm for its expertise on the state of the cemetery and in order to project a general overhaul.

Although the Abbey finally repaired the enclosing wall, in March 1989 the board of cemetery prohibited Pixner any further excavations on its cemetery. The board started fundraising for a general renovation of the cemetery in order to thoroughly reconstruct the enclosing walls, to terrace slopes for gaining additional grave sites, and to repair the paths. Furthermore, all graves were to be refurbished and a viewing platform to be erected to develop the cemetery for tourists.

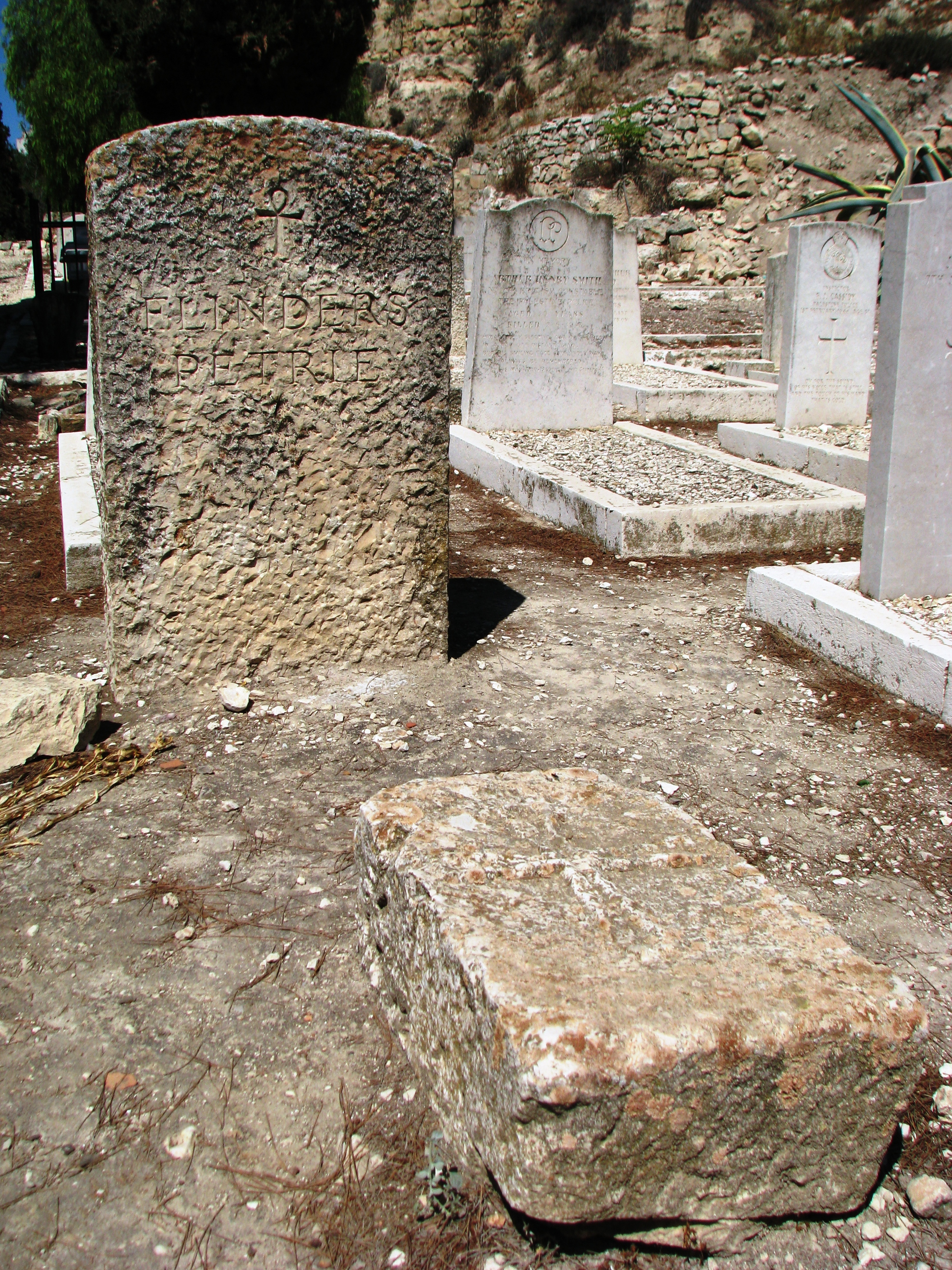
Graves on Mount Zion Cemetery, headstone for William Matthew Flinders Petrie (foreground)

On 14 February 1989 the German embassy in Tel Aviv acknowledged the importance of Mount Zion Cemetery for the ecumenical history of British Anglican and German Evangelical ecclesiastical institutions, also accepting the necessity to finance the maintenance of the cemetery.

The fundraising succeeded with £10,000 donated by the Commonwealth War Graves Commission, £5,758 (DM 19,000) by the German War Graves Commission, £4,242 (DM 14,000) by the German Foreign Office, £3,939 (DM 13,000) by the Evangelical Jerusalem's Foundation, £3,030 (DM 10,000) by the Evangelical Church in Germany (EKD), £5,393.90 (₪ 18,000) by the Anglican Diocese of Jerusalem, and £4,255.19 (₪ 14,200) by Jerusalem's Evangelical congregation of German language.

The commissioned Israeli architects started construction works in 1989. Already in the next year the board administrator asked them to stop all constructions, arguing the board's plans for the future of the cemetery were still unclear. In May 1993 the architects, whose contract had not been formally cancelled, noticed that another firm unilaterally commissioned by the Anglican side continued the constructions. So the originally commissioned architects took recourse against the board for breach of contract. Provost Karl-Heinz Ronecker, vice-chairman of the board, then negotiated a compensation of £1,943.67 ($3,000) for the architects, which the board confirmed on 26 August 1994.

The constructions were continued by the new contractors for a while but never finished. Somewhat more than DM 17,000 of the EKD's share had been expended at that time. In 1992 and 1995 the official celebrations of the German embassy on Volkstrauertag (people’s mourning day) were held on Mount Zion Cemetery. In the following years youth groups from German Protestant congregations and of the Johanniter-Unfall-Hilfe helped maintaining graves and cemetery while staying in a holiday camp in Israel.

With the discontinued constructions the enclosing walls had never been properly renovated. So between 1994 and 1998 the administrator of Mount Zion Cemetery appealed several times at Bishop Samir Kafity to convene the board in order to commission a reconstruction of the walls. The Anglican side refused arguing the maintenance of cemetery walls would be – according to the law – an obligation of the city of Jerusalem.

The EKD then announced it would demand back the remainder of its contribution amounting to DM 5,700. So in 1998 Provost Ronecker unilaterally repaired the walls for $12,000 (£7,289.43). This made the Anglican bishop convene the board in June 1998, whose members developed a fray on how to share the cost. Ronecker proposed to divide the sum in four equal shares to be defrayed by the Anglicans, the Evangelical Protestants, the British government and the German federal government. The latter rejected any contribution, so the Evangelical congregation of Jerusalem shouldered $6,000.

The German embassy, in 1989 so keen to maintain the cemetery, had changed its opinion completely claiming since to be not in charge. Soon later the Anglican administrator of the board of cemetery addressed the German embassy asking for a regular contribution to maintain the cemetery of $3,000, denied again. The Anglican administrator claims that the German government had committed themselves for regular contributions, an obligation neither documented with the embassy nor the Evangelical congregation.

After 1998 any cooperation came to a halt. Without convening the board of cemetery the two congregations started to bury their deceased without informing the other side (three Evangelical burials one each in 1999, 2000 and 2001). In 2005 Bishop Riah Hanna Abu El-Assal told Protestant church representatives from Germany on their visit in Jerusalem that he is planning to convert Mount Zion Cemetery into a park. Jerusalem's Evangelical congregation of German language was completely surprised by this unilateral approach.

=== New beginning since 2006–2007 ===
With the new Provost Uwe Gräbe (as of 2006) and the new Bishop Suheil Salman Ibrahim Dawani the relations improved again. Representatives of EKD on their visit in Jerusalem emphatically submitted Dawani the necessity to convene the board of cemetery again. Mount Zion Cemetery, being the sole burial ground used by Jerusalem's Evangelical congregation of German language, with that congregation growing, would need to return to an orderly administration as provided for by the statutes. So Dawani convened the board again on 12 October 2007.

While interior quarrels somewhat jam the Anglican engagement for the cemetery, new projects demand the board of cemetery to take decisions. The Nature and Parks Authority signalled its wish to include the school garden of the Jerusalem University College, seated in the former Bishop Gobat School, into a public park along the walls of Jerusalem.

In early 2007 members of the Diaspora Yeshiva, seated in the building of David's Tomb, usurped a site in the designated area for the city walls park outside of Mount Zion Cemetery. The Nature and Parks Authority announced to proceed against them but so far without any visible success. The members of Diaspora Yeshiva, illegally holding the new site, have no chance to get regular access to electricity and water supply. Therefore, in autumn 2007 they installed, without authorisation, a water pipe and electricity cable crossing graves on Mount Zion Cemetery connecting to their premise at David's tomb, as members of the board of cemetery had to realise at a cemetery inspection on 12 October of the same year. The board then commissioned the legal advisor of the Anglican Church in Jerusalem to officially protest that intrusion. However, Diaspora Yeshiva did not remove its illegal installations.

For several weeks water poured out of the improperly installed leaking pipe flooding part of the cemetery and thoroughly soaking the earth at the section of the graves of soldiers killed in World War I. On the weekend of 5 and 6 April 2008, the drenched ground imploded into a cavern below the cemetery forming a crater of 5 meter width and 5 meter depth. The cavern most likely forms a part of an excavation tunnel dug by the archaeologists Frederick Jones Bliss and Archibald Dickey in the 1890s.

In the following days and weeks three graves precipitated completely or partially into the crater, a fourth grave is moderately endangered. Although Provost Gräbe and the Evangelical board administrator immediately alarmed all competent authorities the water was only turned off on 9 April. Members of Diaspora Yeshiva did not remove their installations, but climbed again over the enclosing wall trying to repair the wrecked pipe. At the instigation of the representative for the non-Jewish religions in Jerusalem Mayor Uri Lupolianski personally promised the provost on 13 April, to take care of the issue. Several officials of the city administration tried to find a solution until August 2008. They finally reached the removal of the water pipe.

The electricity cable, however, continues to cross the cemetery. Members of Diaspora Yeshiva continued repeatedly to enter the cemetery without any authorisation and thus managed to elevate the cable to three meters of height fixing it at trees on the cemetery. Throughout 2008 members of Diaspora Yeshiva continued to supply their illegal outpost on the site designated for the city walls park – crossing the cemetery – and the Nature and Parks Authority does not get them evicted from the plot.

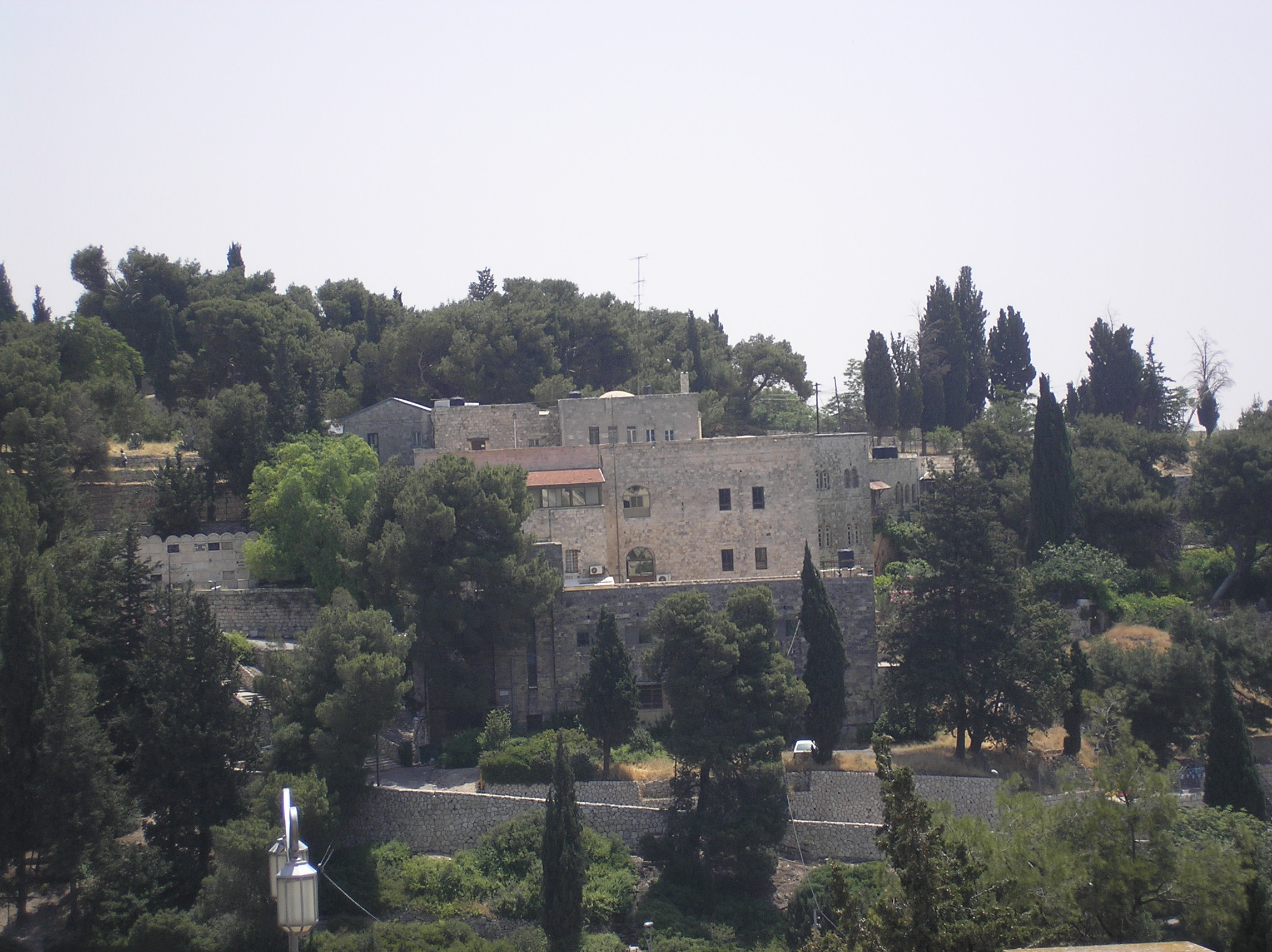
Jerusalem University College against the background of the trees on Mount Zion Cemetery (2009).

On 6 August 2008 a representative of the Commonwealth War Graves Commission, the provost, the Evangelical administrator and the director of Jerusalem University College, who meanwhile has advanced to a guard of the cemetery, inspected the damages in the burial ground. The War Graves Commission consented to rescue the precipitated graves and to close the crater. However, the financing of this difficult operation was completely unclear. Diaspora Yeshiva, which is responsible for the damage, so far did not make up for it.

The crater, the safety barriers, and the signs warning about the danger of collapse at the crater were symptoms of the desolate situation of Mount Zion Cemetery. The cemetery had fallen in decay again, with overgrown graves, dead dry and partially collapsed trees presenting a danger of fire. Criminals and drug addicts again and again climb over the walls and leave their traces, while dogs are straying around too.

The Commonwealth War Graves Commission offered to fill the crater at its own expenses, however, without recovering the precipitated graves and their headstones, which would be a dangerous effort. The Evangelical congregation accepted and decided to commission new headstones. The War Graves Commission intended to fill the crater during November 2008. However, before that the archaeologist Yo'av Arbel (יואב ארבל), Israel Antiquities Authority, asked and was allowed to enter with a colleague through the insecure crater into the cavern underneath in order to explore the excavation tunnel presumably to be assigned to Bliss and Dickey.

In the recent years the board of cemetery paid again some attention to its neglected Jarmaleh Cemetery. The enclosing fence of the Jarmaleh Cemetery has mostly collapsed. Almost all headstones there have been destroyed in wanton vandalism. The graves are overgrown and partially covered with rubbish. The last burial there dates back to 2003.

=== 2020s ===
In January 2023, 30 graves in the cemetery were vandalised by two teenagers. The Israel Police are investigating.

== Ownership and usage ==
Under Ottoman law corporations could not own land, but only natural persons. As stated by the original deed in Arabic and French, issued on the occasion of the land acquisition in 1848, Mount Zion Cemetery was converted into an inalienable religious waqf endowment in favour of the Injiliyyun (Arabic: إنجيليون; i.e. Protestants) as its beneficiaries, represented by their respective spiritual head (French: chef spirituel) as mutevelli (Turkish: mütevelli, i.e. administrator, trustee). A waqf may have beneficiaries, who take usufruct of it, but nobody may dispose of it as property.

However, in 1853 Gobat separated a part of the cemetery, which had not yet been used for burials, in order to domicile the Bishop Gobat School (Bischof-Gobat-Schule; est. 1847) there, a clear contravention of the waqf deed, which demanded a use as cemetery.

With the dissolution of the contract on the joint bishopric in 1886 diplomatic notes were exchanged confirming the status quo of the cemetery with its ambiguities. Paul von Hatzfeldt, German ambassador in London, stated "that the [Prussian] Royal Government takes it for granted that the use of the churchyard for its proper purpose by both Communities on equal footing as well as the equal right of the clergymen of each to perform the proper service shall continue until a possible agreement shall have been arrived at by the two Communities."

British Foreign Secretary Stafford Northcote, 1st Earl of Iddesleigh replied: "The Archbishop [of Canterbury, Archibald Tait,] most readily concurs in the desire expressed in Count Hatzfeldt's letter as to the future harmonious cooperation of the Churches and the continued common use of the churchyard as hitherto." So technically the cemetery continued to be used and administered by the Anglican Bishopric of Jerusalem and the old-Prussian Evangelical Church, represented by the Evangelical pastor of Jerusalem (ranked provost since 1898).

When Bishop Blyth unilaterally issued cemetery rules by end of 1895 Pastor Hoppe expressed the agreement of the Evangelical congregation but asked for future concerted decisions referring to the condominium of both congregations in Mount Zion Cemetery.

Blyth then replied that the cemetery, "is not given either to the English or to the Germans by the Deed of Wakoof. What has always been given has not in any way been interfered with – the right of burying." Furthermore, Gobat's "deed [of foundation of 1874] was illegal – it is not possible to alter a Deed of Wakoof after its completion. … As sole trustee [mütevelli in Ottoman Turkish] of the Ground I cannot, in justice to my Trust, acknowledge the validity of this Deed, which is against the law of land …"

On 2 June 1896 Hoppe pointed out, that Blyth was not to be accepted as the mütevelli, because the waqf deed determined the chef spirituel of the Protestants as mütevelli, but after 1886 the Bishop of Jerusalem was not the spiritual head of all the Protestant waqf beneficiaries any more. In his deed of foundation Gobat, again, had determined his Anglican episcopal successors to be the cemeterial responsible, however, Blyth rejecting that deed, still claimed the task as trustee being connoted with his office.

On 12 May, the same year, Blyth had rejected Hoppe's demand for a bilateral accord, claiming the cemetery would be an Anglican cemetery, where an interference by Lutherans could not be accepted. The dispute gained sharpness so that the two consuls intervened which made Blyth and Hoppe more conciliant again. Blyth and Hoppe adopted the point of view, that the waqf was no property in the sense of western law, with both congregations only being its beneficiaries.

Today's Israel land registry shows the Church Missionary Trust Association Ltd., London, as the proprietor of Mount Zion Cemetery. Jarmaleh Cemetery, in turn, is registered under the name of the Jarmaleh Cemetery Board, which, however, is not registered as a legal entity so that a government dispossession would legally be easily possible at any time.

In May 1984 the Evangelical members of the board of cemetery formally objected by their lawyer for Bishop Kafity had twice overlooked them when inviting for board meetings. The bishop then reconfirmed: "Mount Zion Cemetery […] is a shared responsibility among the Anglican Church, the Lutheran Church, the Commonwealth War Graves Commission and the West German War Graves Commission." The board of cemetery followed that statement: "It was affirmed that the Cemetery is an international Protestant cemetery concerning Britain, Germany and local Anglican churches."

This was, however, not always aware to the Jerusalem University College, seated since 1967 in the Gobat School building, through the site of which is the only access to the lychgate. Several times newly appointed college directors exchanged the locks, barring entrance for the uninformed representatives of the congregations or only reluctantly allowing passage to Mount Zion Cemetery through the site of the college. In 1995 the Anglican Church in Jerusalem readvised the college that representatives of Jerusalem's Evangelical congregation have right of free access to the cemetery at any time.

=== The joint board of cemetery ===
When established in 1906 the burial board (renamed to board of cemetery in 1929) comprised the following persons:

1. Anglican bishop of Jerusalem as chairman
2. Evangelical provost at Redeemer Church, Jerusalem, as vice-chairman
3. British consul in Jerusalem
4. German consul in Jerusalem
5. pastor of the Anglican Christ Church, Jerusalem
6. missionary director of the Church Missionary Society in Jerusalem
7. director of the Syrian Orphanage, Jerusalem
8. director of the German Protestant Institute of Archaeology of the Holy Land in Jerusalem

Since 1962 the Jarmaleh Cemetery Board, responsible for the cemeteries on Mount Zion and in Beit Safafa (Jarmaleh cemetery), comprised the following members:

1. Anglican bishop of Jerusalem as chairman
2. Evangelical provost at Redeemer Church, Jerusalem, as vice-chairman
3. Anglican bishop in Jordan, Lebanon and Syria
4. one representative of the congregation of St. George's Collegiate Church (cathedral), Jerusalem
5. two representatives of the Arab Anglican congregation, Jerusalem
6. pastor of the Anglican Christ Church, Jerusalem
7. two representatives of the Evangelical congregation of German language, Jerusalem
8. two representatives of the Presbyterian congregation of Jerusalem, one being the pastor of St Andrew's Church, Jerusalem

Later the composition of the renamed Mount Zion and Jarmaleh Cemetery Board changed, since 1988 it consists of:

1. Anglican bishop of Jerusalem as chairman
2. Evangelical provost at Redeemer Church, Jerusalem, as vice-chairman
3. British consul-general in Jerusalem
4. Cultural attaché of the German embassy in Tel Aviv-Yafo
5. dean of the Anglican St. George's Cathedral, Jerusalem
6. pastor of the Anglican Christ Church, Jerusalem
7. Jerusalem representative of the Commonwealth War Graves Commission
8. treasurer of the Episcopal Church in Jerusalem
9. administrator of the Evangelical Jerusalem's Foundation
10. administrator of the Episcopal Church in Jerusalem (since January 1989, unclear if without or with a vote)

The accession of the pastor of Ascension Church at Auguste Victoria Foundation and of a pastor of the Presbyterian Church of Scotland was under discussion but never decided. Between 1981 and 1985 the Evangelical Lutheran Church in Jordan had a seat without a vote in the board, and its successor the Evangelical Lutheran Church in Jordan and the Holy Land is currently trying to regain a seat.

== Graves and burials ==
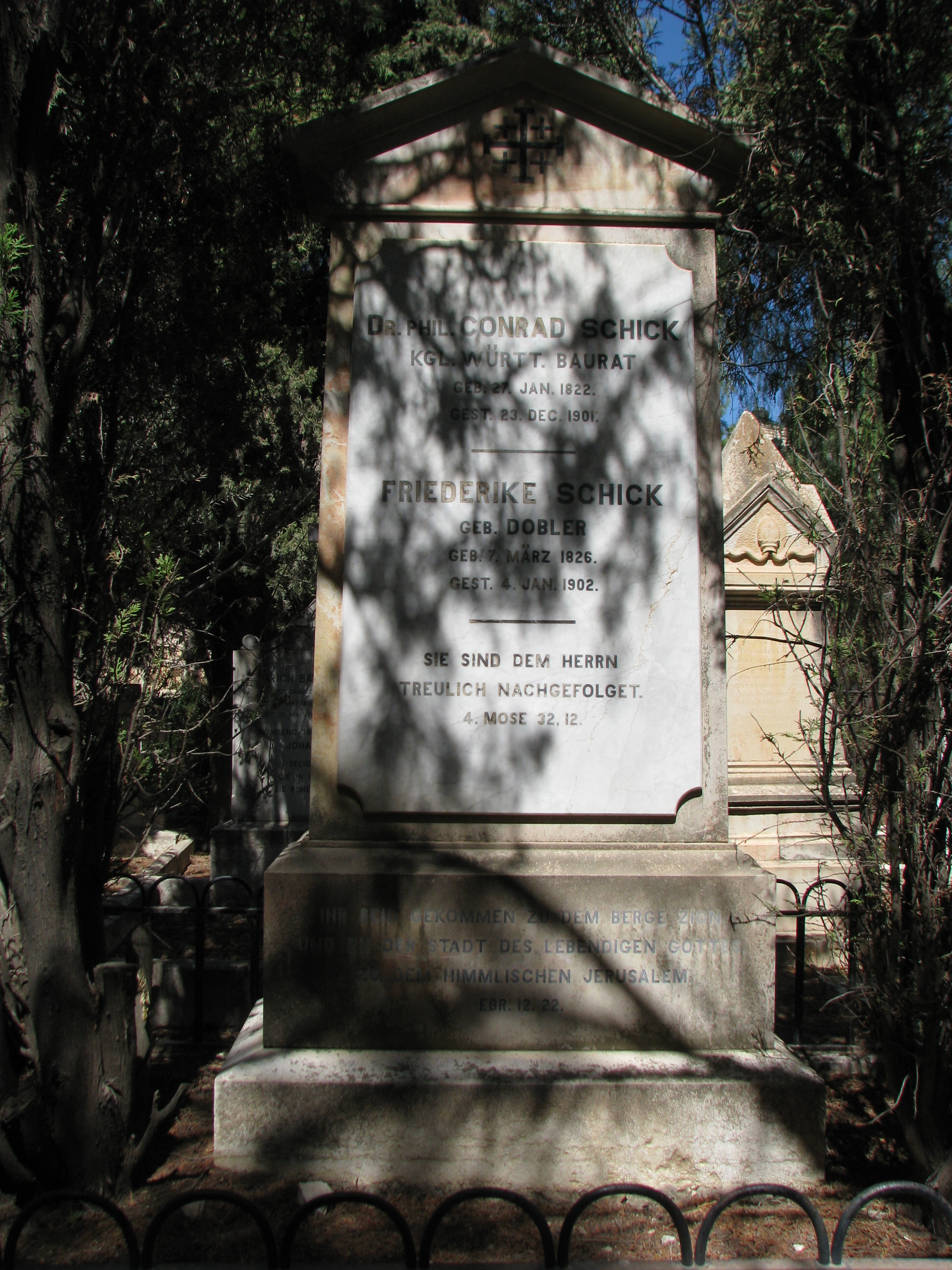
Headstone on the graves of Conrad Schick and Friederike Dobler, with headstone on Bishop Michael Solomon Alexander's grave (background right).

On Mount Zion Cemetery a number of Bishops of Jerusalem have been buried, such as Michael Solomon Alexander, Joseph Barclay, Samuel Gobat, and George Francis Graham Brown.

There are a number of graves of educators, who built up educational institutions in the Holy Land, like Johann Ludwig Schneller (Syrian Orphanage, Jerusalem), the deaconesses Charlotte Pilz, Bertha Harz, and Najla Moussa Sayegh (Talitha Kumi Girls School, Jerusalem until 1948, now Beit Jala), scientists and artists, William Matthew Flinders Petrie (Egyptologist), Conrad Schick (architect), Gustav-Ernst Schultz (Prussian consul, Egyptologist), Anglican and Lutheran clergy, e.g. the first Arab Protestant pastor Bechara Canaan (father of Tawfiq Canaan), deaconesses running the Protestant German Hospital, Adalbert Einsler, doctor at Lepers Hospital Jesushilfe, and many other parishioners of the Anglican and Lutheran congregations of Arabic, English, and German language.

Furthermore, there are graves of British and German diplomats and officials, of officials and policepersons of the British Mandate government – among them victims of anti-British terrorism – and of their family members. The Commonwealth War Graves Commission is taking care of 144 graves of Palestine Policemen, who died in service during the British Mandate.

During the mandatory period the Anglican population in the Holy Land and the Jerusalem Anglican congregation had strongly grown. So between 1925 and 1932 the number of Anglican burials amounted to 75 (parishioners and other Anglicans), 42 of British and 28 of Arabic background, while 27 Evangelical Protestants had been buried, nine of whom were Germans and 12 Arabs.

Last not least Austro-Hungarian, British, and German soldiers killed in action or else deceased in service in the Holy Land were laid to rest. The afore-mentioned two British and sixteen Central Powers' soldiers killed in action are buried in a special section in the centre of the cemetery. As another exception Templers bought grave plots for two deceased of their fellow faithful, before they opened a Templer cemetery of their own in Emeq Rephaim.

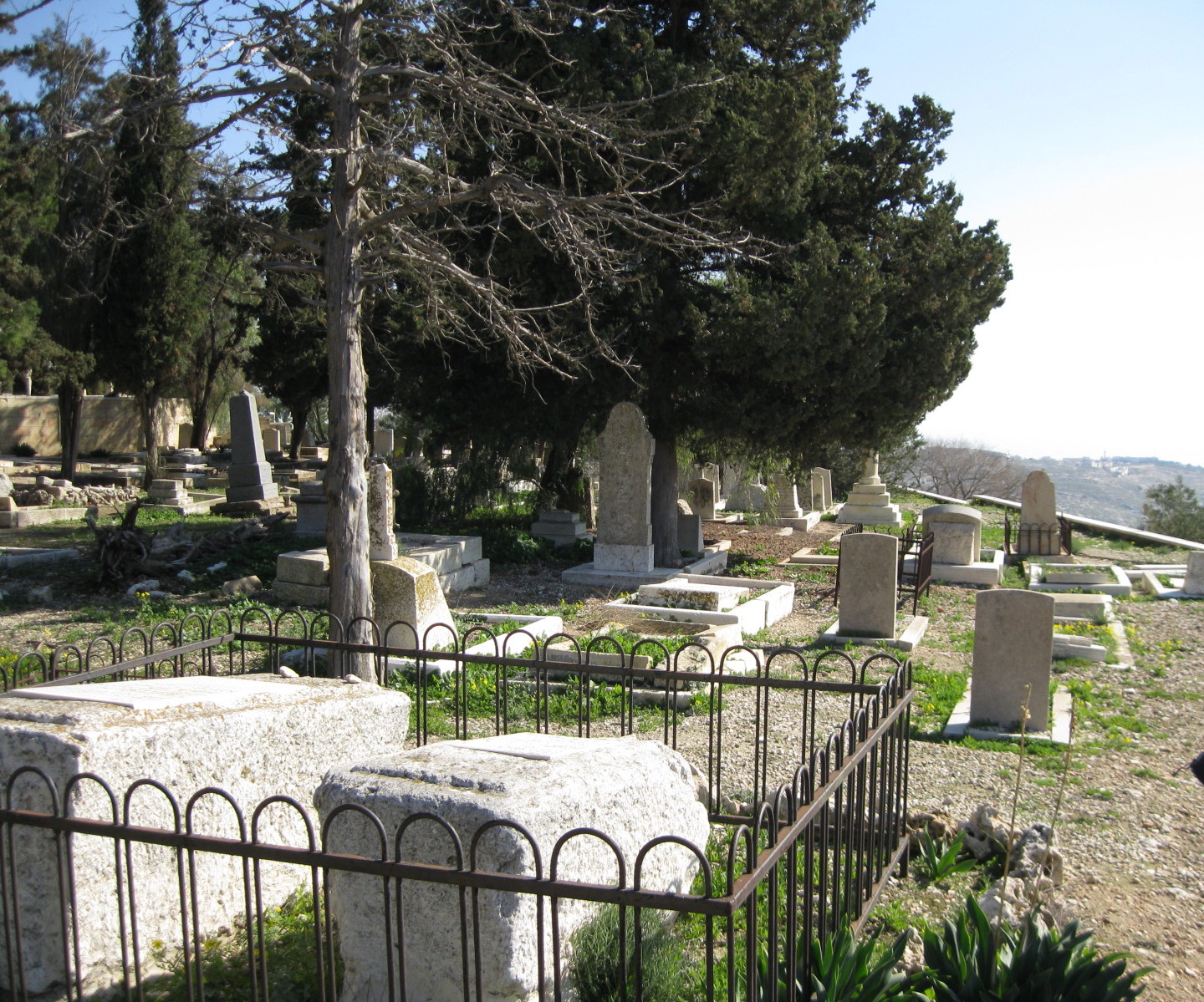
Gravesites in the cemetery

The burial fees – e.g., as fixed in July 1983 – are considerably lower for parishioners of the congregations holding the joint cemetery than for other faithful of the two respective denominations. Between 1982 and 1993 only four interments took place on Mount Zion Cemetery.

The unauthorised burial carried out by members of the adjacent Jerusalem University College in 1989, unconsented with the board of cemetery or any of the enfranchised congregations, aroused their unrest. In a letter of 13 February 1989 to the college the Anglican diocese declared that the responsibility for all burials is with the Anglican bishop as well as with the Evangelical provost.

In 1993 Mount Zion Cemetery comprised 80 empty grave plots, while an additional 50 were planned to be gained at terracing the slopes, which was never finished. After 1994 the Evangelical congregation of German language allowed several burials of Protestant non-parishioners. However, under Israeli law limited tenures on grave sites, as introduced in 1929, are not allowed any more, so that Mount Zion Cemetery will definitely reach its maximal capacity one day.

The plan of empty grave plots is not always followed. In 2002 the grave of an Arab parishioner was erected crossing two graves of German soldiers. Burials continue until this very day and for Jerusalem's Evangelical congregation of German language Mount Zion Cemetery is the sole burial place.

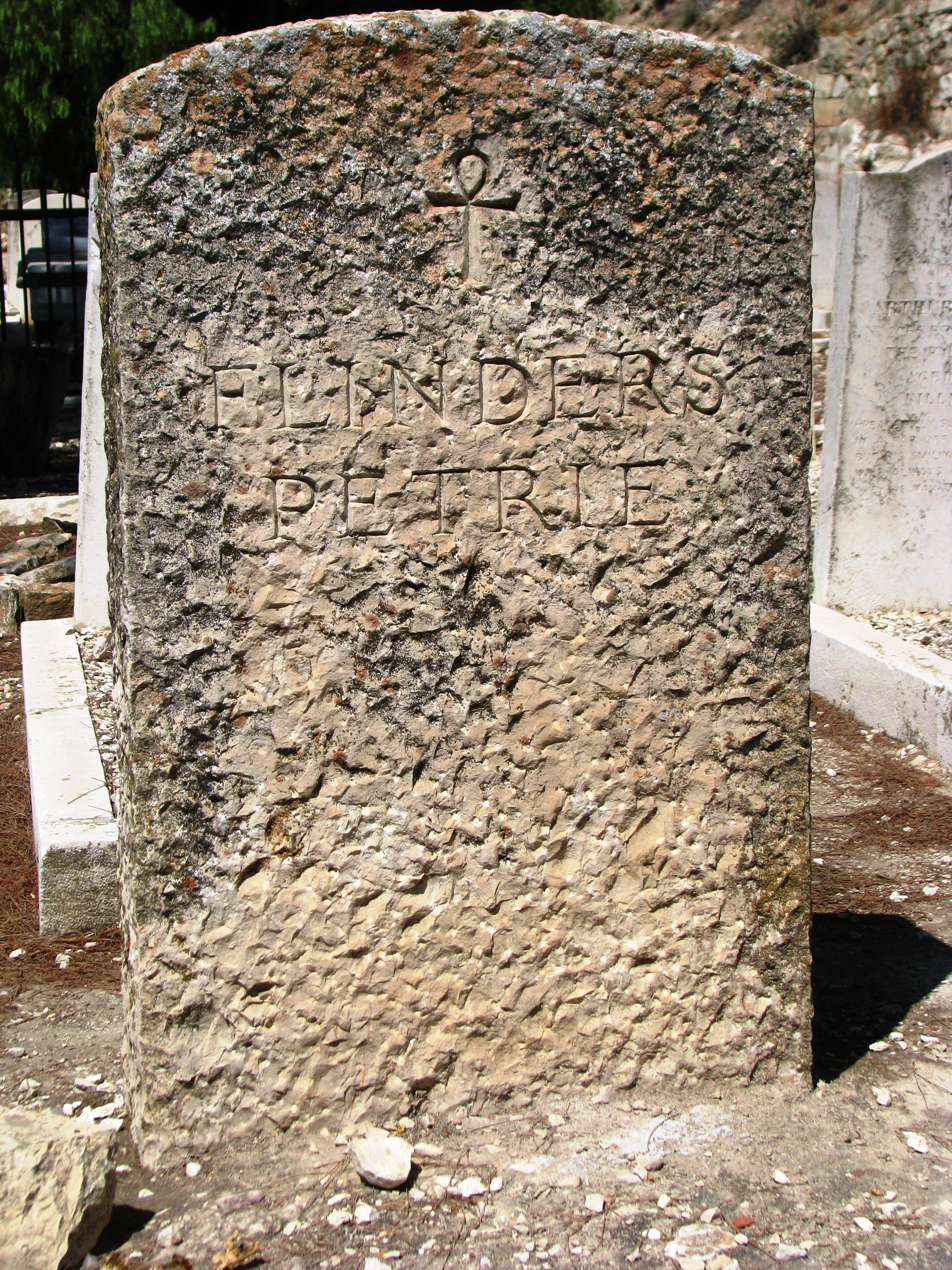
Headstone on the grave of Sir Flinders Petrie.

=== Notable burials ===
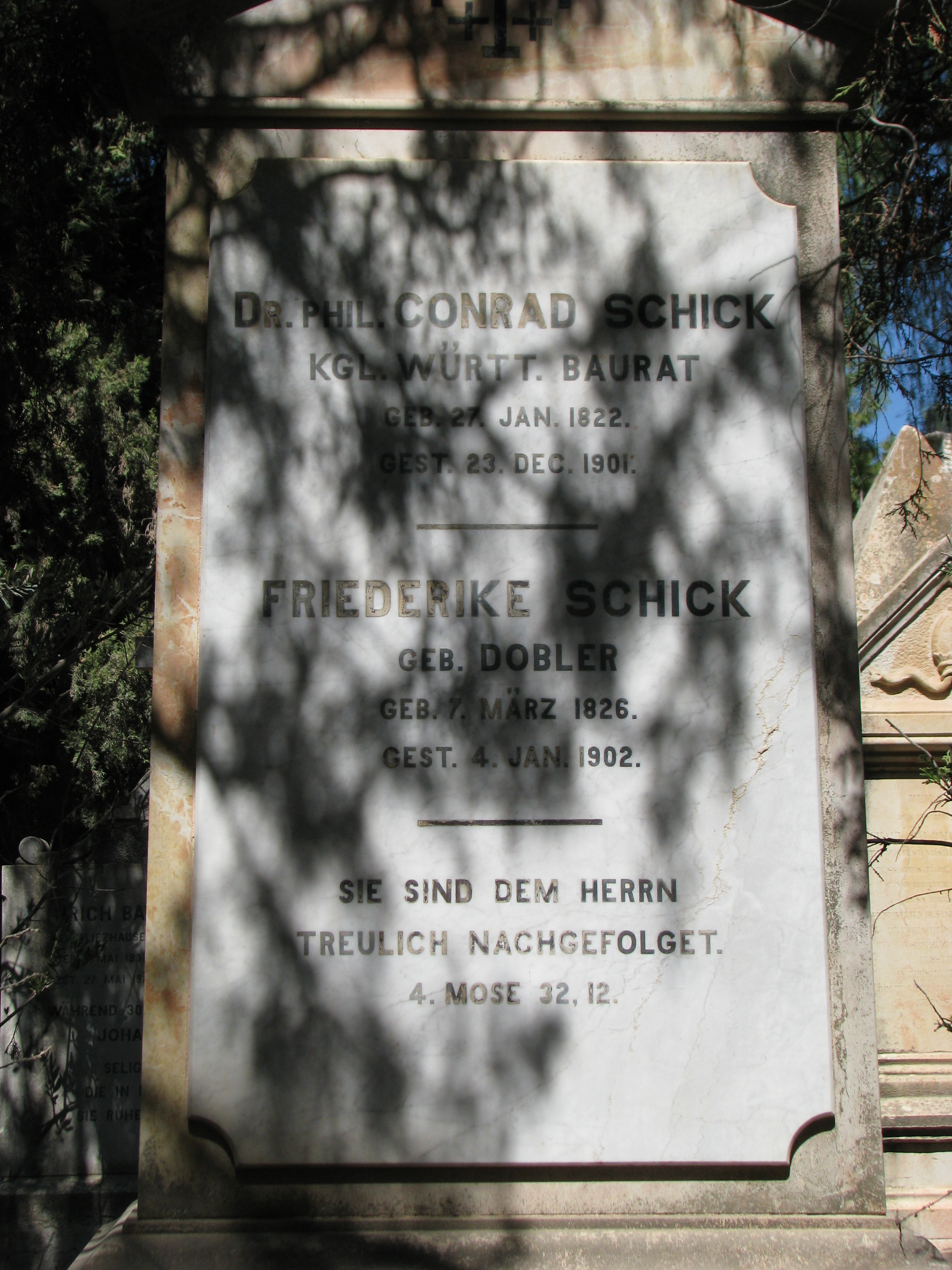
Headstone on the graves of Conrad Schick and Friederike Dobler.

- Michael Solomon Alexander (1799–1845), Bishop of Jerusalem between 1841 and 1845
- Lewis Yelland Andrews (1896–1937), Galilee district commissioner, murdered by Arab terrorists
- Joseph Barclay (1831–1881), Bishop of Jerusalem between 1879 and 1881
- Samuel Gobat (1799–1879), Bishop of Jerusalem between 1846 and 1879, and his wife Marie Zeller (1813–1879)
- George Francis Graham Brown (1891–1942), Bishop of Jerusalem between 1932 and 1942
- William Irvine (1863–1947), Scottish evangelist
- John Meshullam (1799–1878), businessman in Jerusalem, and his wife Mary Fua Meshullam (1809–1882)
- John Nicolayson (Danish born Hans Nicolajsen; 1803–1856), reverend, missionary, founder of the English Hospital
- Sir Flinders Petrie (1853–1942), British Egyptologist
- Johannes Roth (1815–1858), German zoologist and traveller
- Max Sandreczky (1839–1899), German pediatric surgeon who opened and ran the first pediatric hospital in the Holy Land between 1872 and 1899
- Conrad Schick (1822–1901), architect in Jerusalem, and his wife Friederike Dobler (1826–1902)
- Horatio Gates Spafford (1828–1888), US lawyer and hymnologist and author of "It is Well with My Soul"
- James Leslie Starkey (1895–1938), British archaeologist
- Lady Genevieve (Cook) Watson (1854–1936), Widow of Sir Charles Moore Watson KCMG, CB, MA, RE (Pasha Watson)
