= Jerusalem University College =

Independent academic institution in Israel

Coordinates: 31°46′16.1″N 35°13′38.63″E

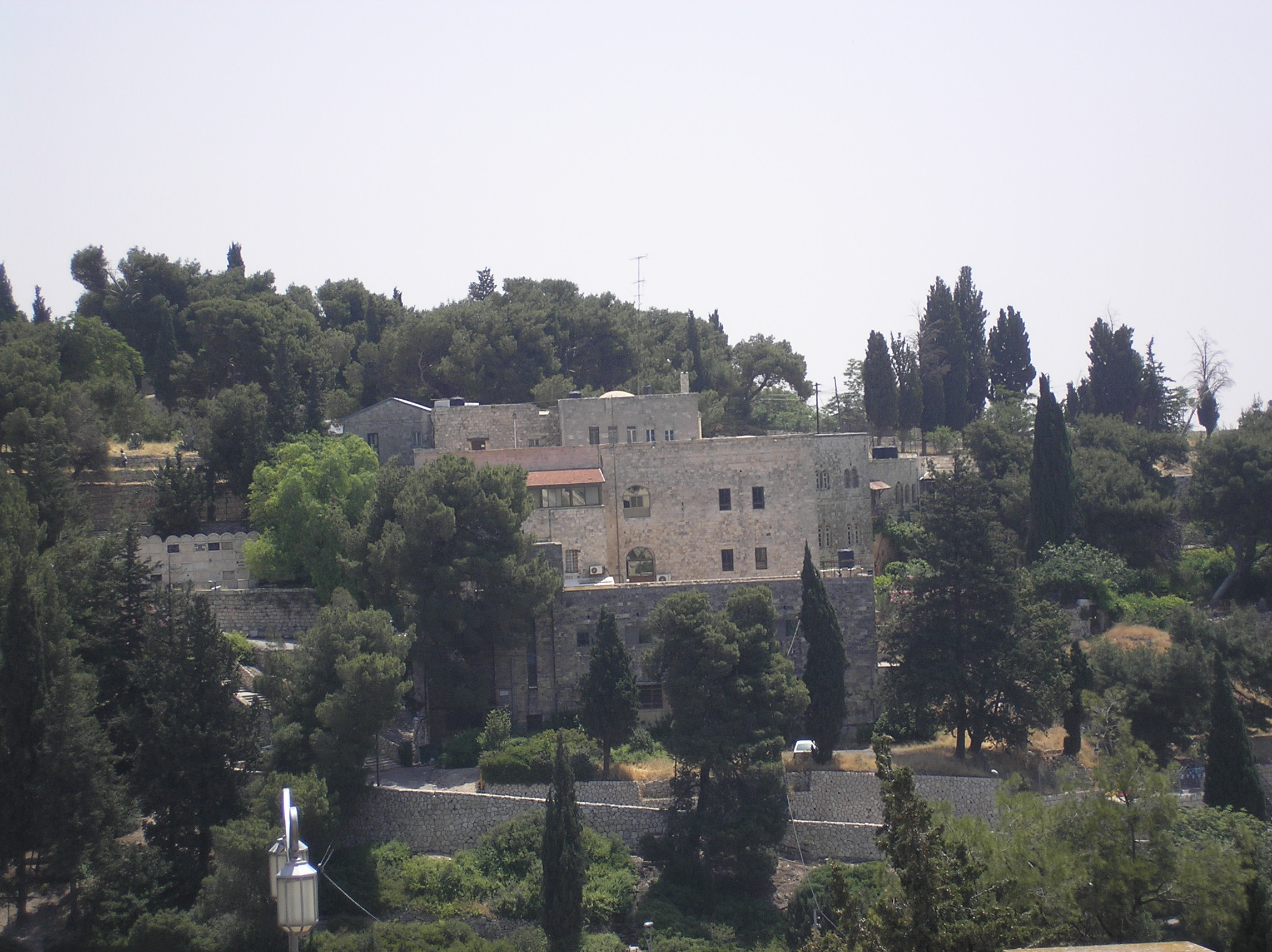
Jerusalem University College against the background of the trees on Mount Zion Cemetery (2009)

Jerusalem University College (formerly American Institute of Holy Land Studies) is an independent undergraduate and graduate academic institution in Israel used by a consortium of North American theological seminaries and Christian colleges.

== History ==
JUC was founded in 1957. It offers an independent two-year graduate program of courses leading to the degrees of Master of Arts in Biblical History and Geography, Hebrew and Cognate Languages, Middle Eastern Cultures and Religions, and the Hebraic Roots of Christianity. For consortium students, it offers a graduate or undergraduate semester or year abroad (in Israel), as well as shorter two and three week courses.

The campus has been located on Mount Zion, outside the Old City of Jerusalem near the Jaffa Gate, since 1967, and overlooks the Hinnom Valley (Valley of Gehenna). The campus grounds were formerly the Bishop Gobat School (est. 1847 by Samuel Gobat), which moved in 1853 in the building erected on unused reserve land of the Protestant Mount Zion Cemetery. It was one of the first structures to be built outside the Old City of Jerusalem, the others being Kerem Avraham, the Schneller Orphanage, Mishkenot Sha'ananim and the Russian Compound,

Instructors hail from across the political and religious spectrum but mainly espouse conservative evangelical Christian thought as represented by the member schools of the consortium,"—these schools include a wide range of Protestant traditions. JUC is accredited by the Asia Theological Association (ATA) and is an international affiliate of the Council for Christian Colleges and Universities.

Jerusalem University College had approximately 32,000 students as of 2021. About 800 students study there each year.

== Accreditation ==
Two of Jerusalem University College's masters programs were accredited by the Asia Theological Association in 1998 and accreditation was recertified by the ATA in 2008 and 2017.

JUC forms a consortium with more than 70 seminaries, colleges, universities, and higher education institutions. Members of this consortium consider JUC their extended campus and send their students there to study.

== See also ==
- Gabriel Barkay, archaeologist, JUC faculty member
