= Ma'ale HaShalom =

Street in East Jerusalem

Coordinates: 31°46′17.35″N 35°13′49.93″E

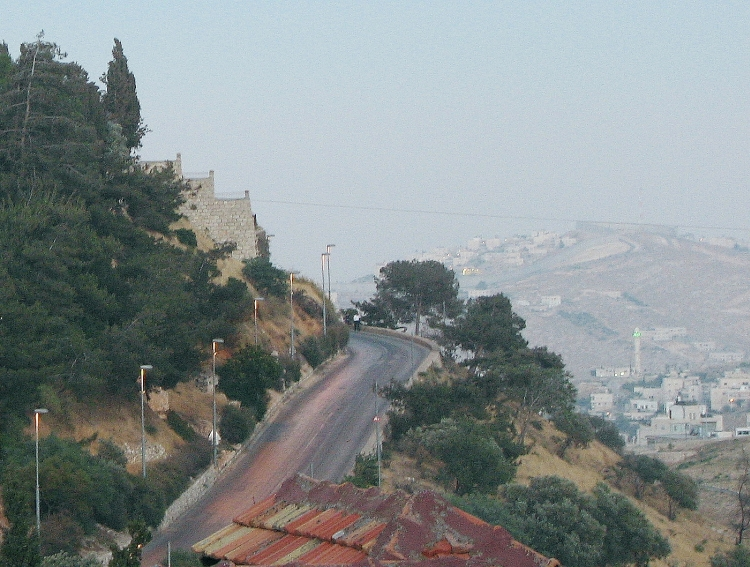
Ma'ale HaShalom, climbing Mt Zion

Ma'ale ha-Shalom (Hebrew: מעלה השלום, translates to Ascent of Peace), also known as the Pope's Road (Hebrew: כביש האַפִּיפְיוֹר, Kevish ha-Apifior), is a street in East Jerusalem.

Ma'ale HaShalom connects Route 60 to Ma'alot Ir David where it becomes Derech ha-Ofel. It goes along the southern border of the Old City, and has the Dung Gate where the entrance to the Jewish Quarter is found. It also goes alongside the Protestant Mount Zion Cemetery and Catholic cemeteries. Though outside the walls of today's old city, the road is considered to be inside of historic sanctified Jerusalem.

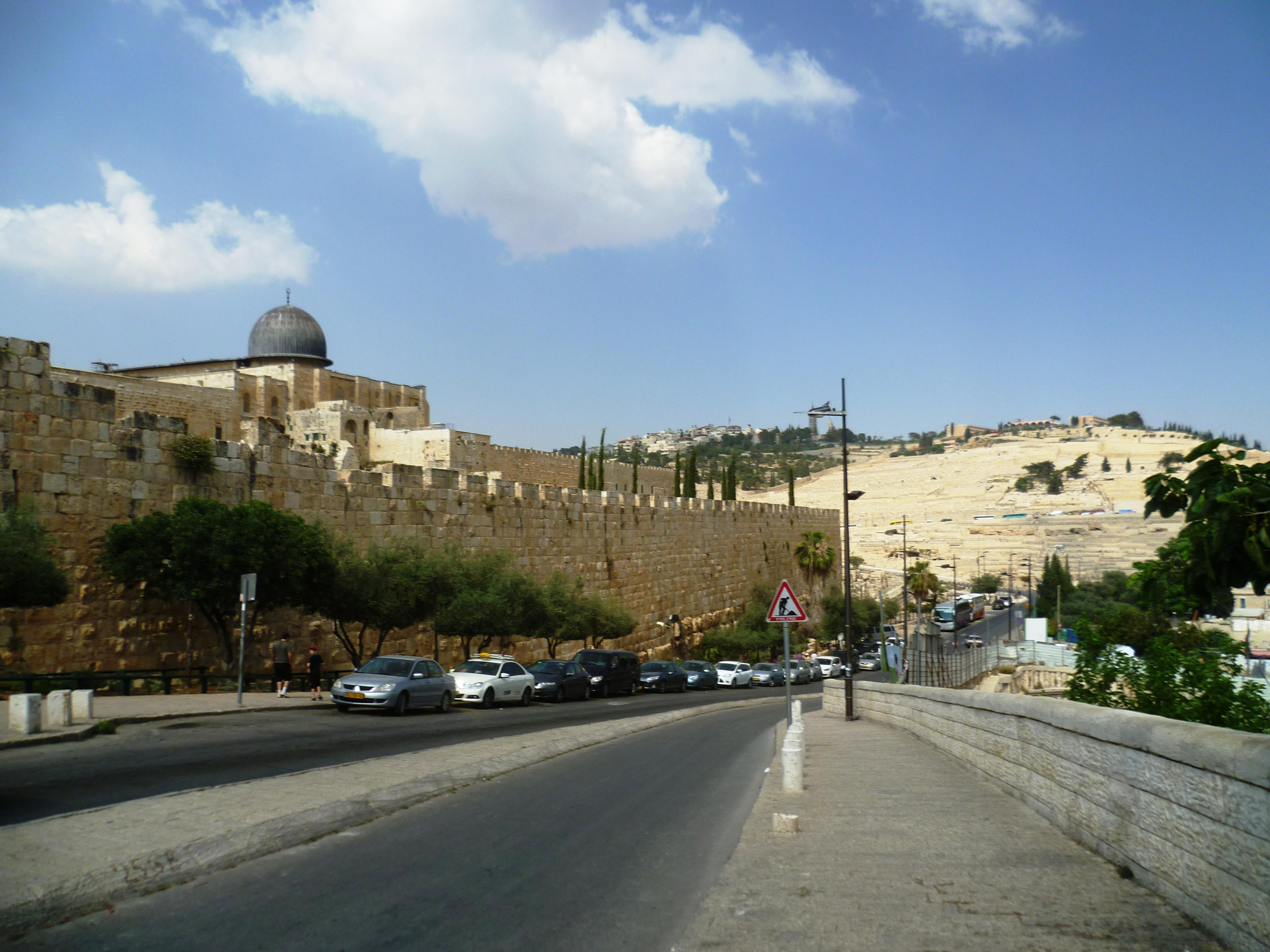
Ma'ale HaShalom Street with a view of the southern city wall of Jerusalem on the left

Before 1964, the way to Mount Zion was a narrow dirt track. That year, Pope Paul VI planned to visit Jerusalem and in his honour, the Jordanians allowed for the widening and laying of a proper road to enable the Pope to be driven to the Coenaculum.

Prior to the Six-Day War, this street was known as Ain el-loza.
