= Hans Nicolajsen =

Danish missionary

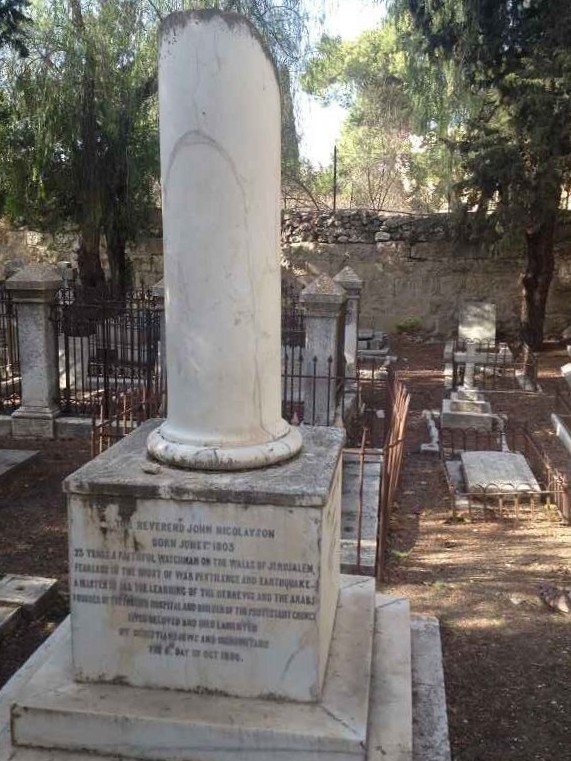
Tomb stone for Hans Nicolajsen on the Mt. Zion Cemetery in Jerusalem

Hans Nicolajsen, known as John Nicolayson (1803 in Løgumkloster – 1856 in Jerusalem) was a Danish missionary to Palestine for the London Society for Promoting Christianity Among the Jews. He was in effect the first representative of the British Christian mission to Jews in Palestine. He was one of those who appealed against the Damascus affair, and was founder of Christ Church, Jerusalem, and Mount Zion Cemetery, Jerusalem as predecessor of Michael Alexander (bishop).

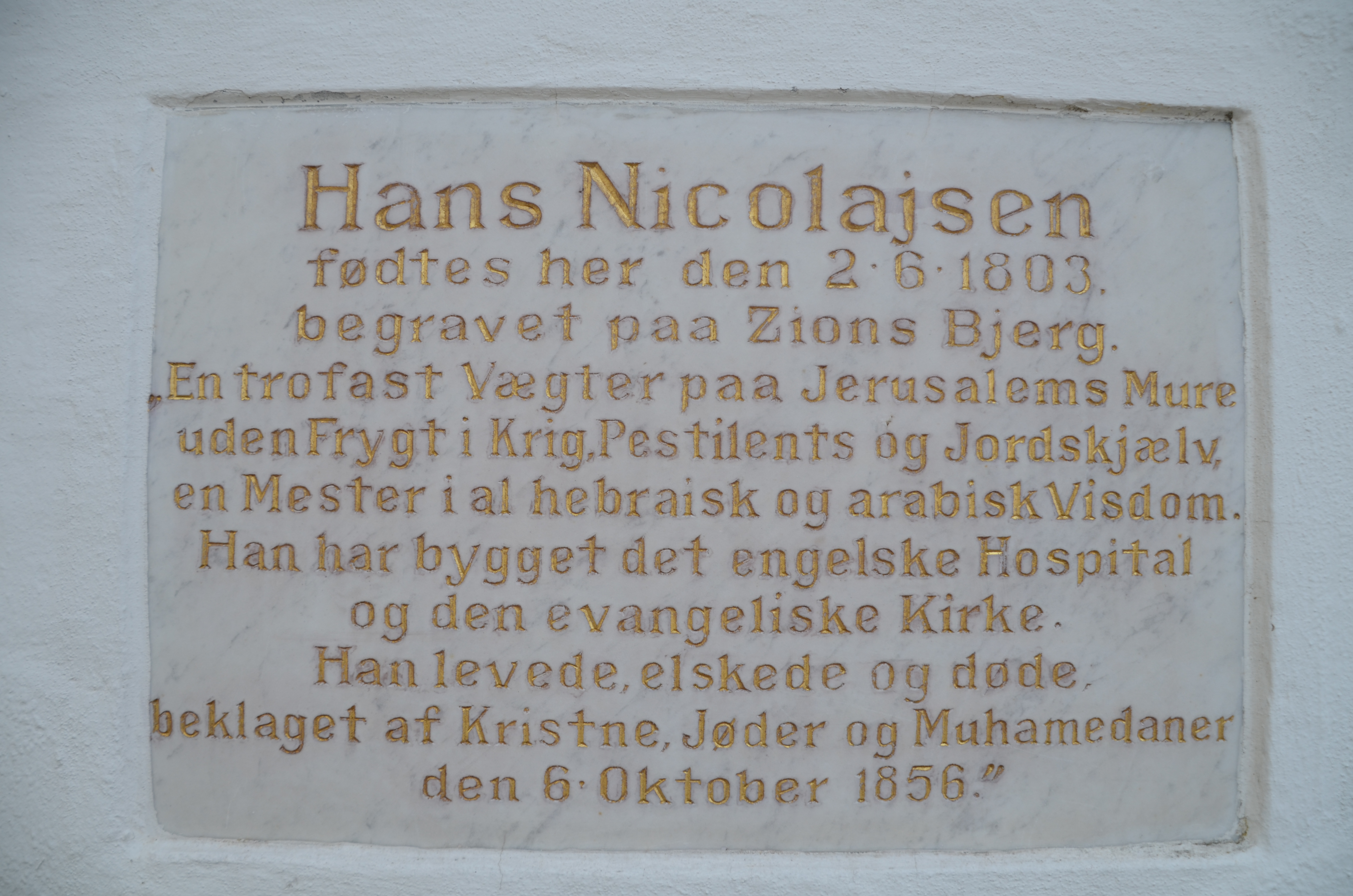
Memorial plaque on Hans Nicolajsen's childhood home in Klostergade, Løgumkloster
