= German Society for the Exploration of Palestine =

German historical research organization

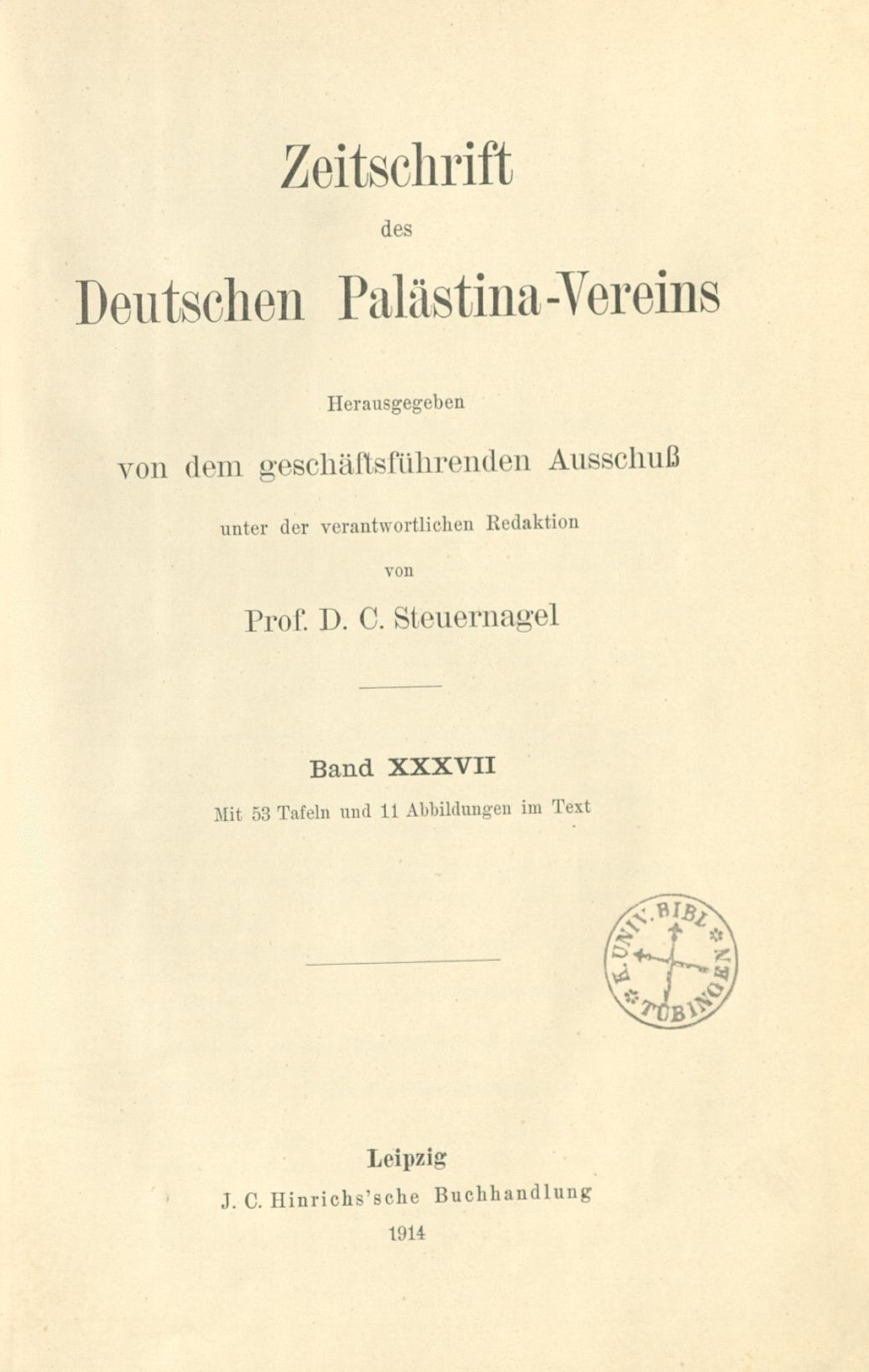
Volume 37 (1914) of the Zeitschrift des Deutschen Palästina-Vereins, the society's biannual peer-reviewed publication

The German Association for the Exploration of Palestine (German: Der Deutsche Verein zur Erforschung Palästinas), also known as the German Palestine Society (Deutscher Palästina-Verein), is a German history research organization.

It was founded by Hermann Guthe, Emil Friedrich Kautzsch, Albert Socin, and Carl Ferdinand Zimmermann in 1877. The organization was modelled on the British Palestine Exploration Fund, with a goal of "advancement of the knowledge of the history of Palestine." The founders felt that German research in the field was overly dependent on foreign scholars. There were 230 members by 1878, including emperor Wilhelm I, and was non-denominational, but mostly Protestant. The organization was originally headquartered in Leipzig, and had many Jewish contributors until 1933. It was focused on the publication of its journal, Journal of the German Society for Exploration of Palestine, and did not directly engage in archaeological work. The journal ceased publication in 1943, and lost its archives to the bombing of Leipzig in 1944. Annual dues were originally set at ten marks, and included a subscription to the quarterly journal.

The organization published Beitraege zur biblischen Landes-und Altertumskunde from 1949 to 1951 and was fully re-established in 1952 in Bonn.

== Former heads ==
- Martin Noth
- Arnulf Kuschke
- Kurt Galling
