= Zeitschrift des Deutschen Palästina-Vereins =

- Discipline: Middle Eastern studies
- Language: English, German
- Edited by: Jens Kamlah, Achim Lichtenberger, Markus Witte

Publication details
- Former name: Beiträge zur biblischen Landes- und Altertumskunde
- History: 1878-present
- Publisher: Harrassowitz Verlag on behalf of the German Society for the Exploration of Palestine (Germany)
- Frequency: Biannually

Standard abbreviations
- ISO 4: Z. Dtsch. Paläst.-Ver.

Indexing
- ISSN: 0012-1169
- LCCN: 08015834 sn85009990, 08015834
- JSTOR: 00121169
- OCLC no.: 6291508, 6291473 2451706, 6291508, 6291473

Links
- Journal homepage

The Zeitschrift des Deutschen Palästina-Vereins (lit. 'Journal of the German Society for Exploration of Palestine') is a biannual peer-reviewed academic journal covering research on the cultural history of the Southern Levant. It is published by Harrassowitz Verlag on behalf of the Deutscher Verein zur Erforschung Palästinas (German Society for the Exploration of Palestine). The editors-in-chief are Jens Kamlah, Achim Lichtenberger, and Markus Witte. The journal was established in 1878. Publication was suspended from 1946 to 1948, but re-started in 1949, when the title was changed to Beiträge zur biblischen Landes- und Altertumskunde. Only a single volume (#68) was produced in three issues until 1951 and publication was again suspended in 1952. From 1953 onwards the journal appeared under its original title.

== Abstracting and indexing ==
The journal is abstracted and indexed in:

- Arts and Humanities Citation Index
- ATLA Religion Database
- Current Contents/Arts & Humanities
- Index Islamicus
- L'Année philologique
- Linguistic Bibliography
- Scopus

== Journal editions ==
- Zeitschrift des Deutschen Palästina-Vereins, Band X, 1887
- Zeitschrift des Deutschen Palästina-Vereins, Band XV, 1892
- Zeitschrift des Deutschen Palästina-Vereins, Band XXXI, 1908, Band XXXII, 1909, Band XXXIII, 1910
- Zeitschrift des Deutschen Palästina-Vereins (1878), Volume: 1-2, 1878
    - with p.135ff: A. Socin: Alphabetischer Verzeichniss von Ortschaften des Paschalik Jerusalem
- Zeitschrift des Deutschen Palästina-Vereins (1878), Volume: 3-4, 1880
- Zeitschrift des Deutschen Palästina-Vereins (1878), Volume: 5-6, 1882
- Zeitschrift des Deutschen Palästina-Vereins (1878), Volume: 7-8, 1884
- Zeitschrift des Deutschen Palästina-Vereins (1878), Volume: 9-10, 1886
- Zeitschrift des Deutschen Palästina-Vereins (1878), Volume: 11-12, 1888
- Zeitschrift des Deutschen Palästina-Vereins (1878), Volume: 13-14, 1890
- Zeitschrift des Deutschen Palästina-Vereins (1878), Volume: 15-16, 1892
  - Register zu band XVI -XXV
- Zeitschrift des Deutschen Palästina-Vereins (1878), Volume: 17-18, 1894
- Zeitschrift des Deutschen Palästina-Vereins (1878), Volume: 19-20, 1896
- Zeitschrift des Deutschen Palästina-Vereins (1878), Volume: 21-22, 1898
- Zeitschrift des Deutschen Palästina-Vereins (1878), Volume: 23-24, 1900
- Zeitschrift des Deutschen Palästina-Vereins (1878), Volume: 25-26, 1902
- Zeitschrift des Deutschen Palästina-Vereins (1878), Volume: 27-28, 1904
- Zeitschrift des Deutschen Palästina-Vereins (1878), Volume: 29-30, 1906
- Zeitschrift des Deutschen Palästina-Vereins (1878), Volume: 31-32, 1908
