= Mouneer Anis =

Egyptian Anglican bishop

The Most Reverend Mouneer Anis D.D.
- Archbishop of Alexandria
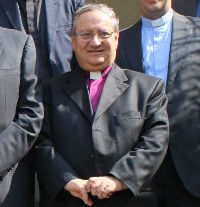
- Church: Episcopal/Anglican Province of Alexandria
- In office: 2020–2021
- Successor: Samy Fawzy
- Other post: Bishop of Egypt (2000–2021)
- Previous posts: Presiding Bishop of the Episcopal Church in Jerusalem and the Middle East; Director of Harpur Memorial Hospital, Menouf, Egypt - Administrator of the Diocese of Egypt

Orders
- Ordination: 1997 (deacon); 1999 (priest) by Ghais Abdel Malik
- Consecration: 15 May 2000 by Ghais Abdel Malik

Personal details
- Born: 8 April 1952 (age 74) Shebin El Kom, Monofia, Egypt

Mouneer Hanna Anis (born 8 April 1950) is an Egyptian Anglican bishop. He was Bishop of Egypt from 2000 to 2021, and the first Anglican Archbishop of Alexandria from 2020 to 2021. He was the Presiding Bishop of the Episcopal Church in Jerusalem and the Middle East from 2007 to 2017, when his diocese was part of that ecclesiastical province.

He is also professionally a physician, and an amateur photographer and painter. He is married and has two sons.

== Professional career ==
Anis earned his Bachelor of Medicine and Surgery degree at Cairo University in 1974. He worked at Harpur Memorial Hospital in Menouf from 1979 to 1999, as Resident until 1989 and as Director since 1984.

He received a Diploma of Tropical Medicine and Hygiene from the London School of Tropical Medicine in 1986. He was also given a Certificate in Hospital Management and Administrations from the School of Public Health of the University of California in the United States in 1992.

== Religious career ==
Anis sought holy orders at a relatively late age, being ordained deacon in 1997, and priest in 1999. He served at All Saints Cathedral in Cairo, and later became Administrator of the Diocese of Egypt. He went to do theological and practical training at Moore Theological College, in Sydney, Australia, at the Diocese of Canterbury, in England, and at Nashotah House, in the United States.

He was elected Bishop of Egypt by the Diocesan Synod, and was the third Egyptian national to serve as bishop of the Diocese of Egypt. His consecration took place on 15 May 2000, and served until the mandatory Anglican episcopal retirement age of 70.

He was also elected in 2007 as the Presiding Bishop of the Episcopal Church in Jerusalem and the Middle East, being reelected in 2012, and finishing his term in 2017. His diocese has subsequently separated from the Episcopal Church in Jerusalem and the Middle East, with permission, and formed the autonomous Episcopal/Anglican Province of Alexandria, consisting of four new dioceses, of which he is also the Primate. He is one of only a small number of Anglican bishops to have served as the Archbishop and Primate of two different ecclesiastical provinces.

Anis has been involved in the Anglican realignment, as a member and the former chairman of the Global South Primates Steering Committee. He supported the inception of the Anglican Church in North America in 2009. He decided not to attend the first Global Anglican Future Conference, held in Jerusalem, in 2008, but he attended the Global South meeting in Singapore, in 2010.

Anglican Communion titles
Preceded by Ghais Abdel Malik	Bishop of Egypt; 2000–2021	Succeeded by Samy Fawzy
Preceded by Clive Handford	President Bishop of the Episcopal Church in Jerusalem and the Middle East; 2007–2017	Succeeded by Suheil Dawani
Preceded by Province created	Archbishop of Alexandria; 2020–2021	Succeeded by Samy Fawzy
Preceded by John Chew	Chairman of the Global South Fellowship of Anglican Churches; 2012–2020	Succeeded by Justin Badi Arama
