= Ashley Null =

American Anglican theologian

The Right Reverend Ashley Null FRHistS FSA
- Bishop of North Africa
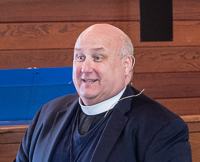
- Null addressing the synod of the Anglican Diocese of the Living Word in 2018
- Church: Episcopal/Anglican Province of Alexandria
- Diocese: North Africa
- In office: 2025–present
- Predecessor: Anthony Ball
- Other posts: Canon theologian, Episcopal Diocese of Western Kansas

Orders
- Ordination: 1986 (priesthood) by C. FitzSimons Allison
- Consecration: May 11, 2025 by Samy Fawzy

Personal details
- Born: 1960 or 1961 (age 65–66) Birmingham, Alabama, US
- Profession: Theologian, author
- Education: Southern Methodist University (B.A.); Yale Divinity School (M.Div., S.T.M.); University of Cambridge (Ph.D., B.D.)

John Ashley Null (born 1960 or 1961) is an American theologian and Anglican bishop. As an academic, he is best known for his research on the theology of Thomas Cranmer, particularly Cranmer's doctrines of repentance and scripture, and his influence on the English Reformation. Null's capsule summary of Cranmer's doctrine of anthropology has been widely quoted: "What the heart loves, the will chooses, and the mind justifies." Null also works as a sports chaplain, counseling Olympic and other elite athletes. Ordained in the Episcopal Church, he was canon theologian in the Diocese of Western Kansas but maintained close ties to the Anglican realignment movement as a theological adviser to the Anglican Church in North America (ACNA)'s Diocese of the Carolinas. He was also a canon theologian at St. Mark's Pro-Cathedral in Alexandria, Egypt and board chairman of the Alexandria School of Theology, both part of the Anglican Province of Alexandria. In 2025, Null was elected and consecrated as the second bishop of the Diocese of North Africa in the Province of Alexandria.

== Early life and education ==
Null was born in Birmingham, Alabama, and raised in Salina, Kansas, where he grew up attending Christ Cathedral. After completing a Bachelor's degree at Southern Methodist University, he received a Master of Divinity degree at Yale Divinity School.

Null was ordained a deacon at Christ Cathedral, then served a curacy at Grace Church and Grace Church School in New York City, during which time he was ordained as a priest. He obtained his S.T.M. at Yale, then returned to Kansas, where he pastored St. Andrew's Episcopal Church in Liberal. After two years in Liberal, Null was awarded a Fulbright fellowship to study for a Ph.D. at Cambridge. He studied there under Diarmaid MacCulloch, a historian of Christianity. He completed his Ph.D. in 1995 with a dissertation on "Thomas Cranmer's Doctrine of Repentance".

== Scholarship ==
=== Cranmer ===
In 2000, Oxford University Press published Null's doctoral dissertation as Thomas Cranmer's Doctrine of Repentance: Renewing the Power to Love, which was based on a study of Cranmer's private papers. In the book, Null rejected biographical interpretations of Cranmer's theology that were based on his recantation of Protestant doctrines under Mary I and his renunciation of his recantation just before his execution.

Instead, Null focused on the development and context of Cranmer's "mature theology", starting with the Scotist and later Erasmian views Cranmer learned during his education and ordained ministry, and advanced a view of Cranmer as "building a unitary vision of history on one big idea—that God's love for his enemies worked everything to good." According to a reviewer in The Journal of Theological Studies, Null explores Cranmer's "decisive shift towards an Augustinian reading of Paul and a Lutheran understanding of justification" following a 1532 visit to Nuremberg, and Cranmer's arrival by 1537 at a theology of justification as imputed righteousness with "our assurance of salvation resting entirely on the promise of God and in our election." This imputed righteousness complements righteousness "produced by the regeneration of the believer through the power and indwelling of the Holy Spirit" to produce a capacity in the believer to "rightly will", which produces repentance as its fruit. Through Cranmer's reshaping of soteriology, Null argues, the archbishop sought to "emphasise the generous and unreserved love God had for humankind."

Thomas Cranmer's Doctrine of Repentance received several scholarly reviews. Robert Peters called it "an impressive reconstruction of the development of Cranmer's doctrine of repentance." In Albion, Dewey D. Wallace Jr. called it "an outstanding contribution to our understanding of Cranmer's theology . . . thorough and penetrating in its analysis of sources, impressively conversant with the vocabulary and issues of late scholasticism, and persuasive in its picture of Cranmer's theological development." Reviewers also praised Null's use of "little used Latin works" by Cranmer: the Great Commonplaces, De Sacramentis and the Croydon Commentary. One reviewer noted that the Commonplaces were only available in manuscript form and warranted publication.

Null's research informed his adviser MacCulloch's 1996 biography of Cranmer and contributed to the scholarly perspective that Cranmer's Anglicanism was thoroughly Protestant and did not represent a "via media" between Protestantism and Rome. However, according to one reviewer, Null distinguishes Cranmer's doctrine from the Lutheran tradition and subsequent Calvinist developments on the Continent to show "that the English Reformation should not be seen as a relatively minor adjunct to the Continental Reformation, but as an interrogative movement in its own right."

From 2012 to 2018, Null held a research appointment funded by the German Research Foundation at Humboldt University of Berlin where he worked on preparing Cranmer's Commonplaces for publication in five volumes.

In 2001, Null gave an interview to the newsletter of the Australian Anglican Church League. Commenting on Cranmer's soteriology, he said: "According to Cranmer's anthropology, what the heart loves, the will chooses, and the mind justifies. The mind doesn't direct the will. The mind is actually captive to what the will wants, and the will itself, in turn, is captive to what the heart wants." The first part of this quotation has become an often-quoted distillation of Protestant theology used by other writers and theologians.

=== Anglicanism ===
Null later applied Cranmer's doctrine of scripture to the controversies in the Anglican Communion over homosexuality. According to Null, a Cranmerian approach to reading and applying scripture would be christocentric, dynamic (in its openness to the work of the Holy Spirit), discerning (in not allowing one passage of scripture to contradict another) and decisive. Thus, in its call to view the books of the Bible as "vehicles of the Spirit's work in energising the Church in its mission and shaping it in the holiness of new creation," the Windsor Report—which recommended a moratorium on the consecration of actively LGBT bishops and on blessings of same-sex unions—"has, in fact, repristinated for our day a fundamental principle of historic Anglicanism."

Anglican theologian Gerald McDermott has critiqued Null's characterization of sola scriptura as the Anglican doctrine of scripture in a 2023 lecture at Trinity Anglican Seminary, which Null described as meaning that "no matter how much Tradition could help illuminate the Bible's meaning, ultimately it was its own final interpreter." McDermott argued that "for the English Reformers sola scriptura meant the primacy of Scripture when read within the Church's great traditions, which has been aptly called prima scriptura." McDermott argued that the continued acceptance of women's ordination within Anglican realignment churches was an expression of Null's approach to scripture, whereas a dependence on tradition, he said, would foreclose women's orders.

Despite his past canonical residence in the Episcopal Church, Null has been widely supportive of the Anglican realignment. He was one of the authors of the Jerusalem Declaration adopted at the 2008 Global Anglican Future Conference and a keynote speaker at the 2023 GAFCON in Kigali. He is a theological adviser to the Global Fellowship of Confessing Anglicans and the ACNA's Diocese of the Carolinas, where he is also a senior research fellow at the Ridley Institute, the adult education program of St. Andrew's Church. Since 2015, Null has been canon theologian at St. Mark's Anglican Pro-Cathedral in Alexandria, Egypt, and since 2018 chairman of the board of the Alexandria School of Theology, a seminary of the Anglican Province of Alexandria, which is aligned with both Gafcon and the Anglican Communion.

== Clerical career ==
In 2005, Null was appointed canon theologian in the Episcopal Diocese of Western Kansas, though he remained largely based in Europe to conduct his theological and historical research.

Null has become known for his work as a chaplain to elite athletes over four decades, including at six Olympic games as a chaplain to the British team. Olympic swimmer Adam Peaty credited Null with his conversion to evangelical Christianity in the runup to the 2024 Summer Olympics. Null met regularly with Peaty, reportedly telling Peaty that "the gold medal is the coldest thing you'll ever wear. . . . You're expecting it to solve all your issues. And it might solve some of them, but it will not solve the majority." Null has said that his scholarly interest in the Reformation informed his chaplaincy ministry, noting that the Reformation was "the recovery of the gospel, and the gospel is the antidote to performance-based identity."

In February 2025, Null was elected the second Anglican bishop of North Africa, to succeed Anthony Ball. He was consecrated as a bishop on May 11, 2025, at St. George's Church in Tunis. Null was an invited guest representing Anglicanism—seated in the front row of the Basilica of Saint Augustine in Annaba—when Pope Leo XIV visited Algeria in April 2026.

== Honors ==
Null has been elected a fellow of the Royal Historical Society and a fellow of the Society of Antiquaries of London. Null is an Eagle Scout and was one of six winners of the Young American Award for 1982.

== Works ==
=== Anglican theology ===
- Null, Ashley (2000). Thomas Cranmer's Doctrine of Repentance: Renewing the Power to Love. Oxford: Oxford University Press. ISBN 9780198270218.
- Null, Ashley (December 2006). "Thomas Cranmer and the Anglican Way of Reading Scripture". Anglican and Episcopal History. 75 (4): 488–526. JSTOR 42613020.
- Null, Ashley (2011). "Official Tudor Homilies". In Adlington, Hugh; McCullough, Peter; Rhatigan, Emma (eds.). The Oxford Handbook of the Early Modern Sermon. Oxford: Oxford University Press. pp. 348–365. ISBN 9780199237531
- Null, Ashley (2014). Divine Allurement: Cranmer's Comfortable Words. London: Latimer Press. ISBN 978-1-906327-23-1.
- Null, Ashley; Yates, John, eds. (2017). Reformation Anglicanism: A Global Vision for Today. Wheaton: Crossway. ISBN 978-1433552137.
- Eastertide: Meditations on the Easter Collects of Thomas Cranmer (Anglican House, 2024) ISBN 9781735902258

=== Athletics ===
- Null, John Ashley (2004). Real Joy: Freedom to Be Your Best. Hanssler. ISBN 978-3775139663.
- Null, John Ashley (2022). "Towards a Theology for Competitive Sport". Movement and Being: The Journal of the Christian Society for Kinesiology, Leisure and Sports Studies. 7 (2).
- Performance Identity: The Folly of Striving for God's Approval (Anglican House, 2024) ISBN 9798987802694
