= Anthony Ball =

Anglican bishop and diplomat

The Right Reverend Anthony Ball
- Director of the Anglican Centre in Rome and Representative of the Archbishop of Canterbury to the Holy See
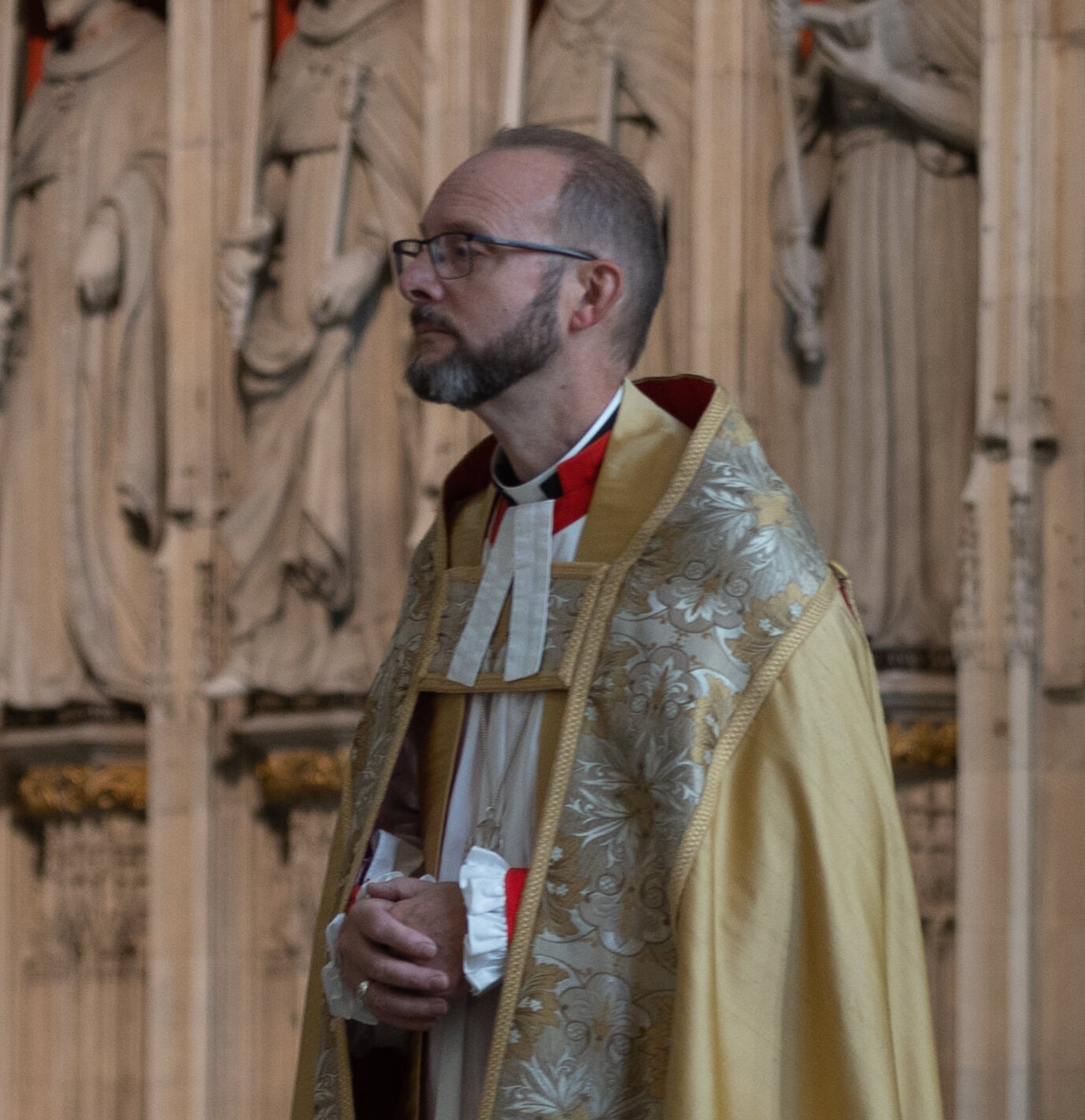
- Ball in 2024
- Church: Episcopal/Anglican Province of Alexandria; Church of England
- In office: 2025–present
- Predecessor: Ian Ernest
- Other posts: Archdeacon of Westminster (2024–2025); Canon Steward of Westminster Abbey (2016–2025)
- Previous posts: Bishop of North Africa (2024–2025); Area Bishop, Diocese of Egypt (2021–2024)

Orders
- Ordination: 2001
- Consecration: 30 November 2021 by Samy Fawzy

Personal details
- Born: 1968 (age 57–58) Rhodesia
- Denomination: Anglicanism
- Spouse: Celia
- Children: 1
- Education: St Chad's College, Durham (BA); Heythrop College, University of London (MA)

Anthony James Ball (born 1968) is a Rhodesia-born British Anglican bishop and diplomat. Since February 2025, he has been director of the Anglican Centre in Rome and the Archbishop of Canterbury’s Representative to the Holy See. Previously, he was bishop of North Africa in the Episcopal/Anglican Province of Alexandria and a canon at Westminster Abbey.

== Early life and career ==
Ball was born in Rhodesia, present-day Zimbabwe, in 1968, and was raised in southern Africa. After studies at Durham University, where he reads at St Chad's College, he entered HM Diplomatic Service and held postings in Spain and the Middle East. During his diplomatic career, Ball was ordained as an Anglican priest. He also served in Anglican chaplaincies in Madrid and Damascus, where he was Archbishop of Canterbury Rowan Williams' representative to the heads of the Orthodox churches in Syria and Lebanon.

== Westminster Abbey ==
In 2005, Ball returned to England as an adviser to Williams on Anglican Communion, ecumenical and international affairs. He was later rector of St Nicholas Church, Worth. Ball joined the leadership of Westminster Abbey in September 2016 as canon steward.

Over the course of the next several years, Ball also served as canon rector, rector of St. Margaret’s, almoner and sub-dean. As a canon, he took part in the state funeral of Queen Elizabeth II and the coronation of Charles III and Camilla.

== Episcopacy ==
On 30 November 2021, shortly after the Province of Alexandria was recognized as a new Anglian Communion province, Ball was consecrated as an assistant bishop in the Anglican Diocese of Egypt. He held this role on a part-time basis while remaining resident at Westminster Abbey. In January 2024, at a service in N'Djamena, Ball was installed as the first diocesan bishop of North Africa—which covers Algeria, Chad, Libya, Mauritania, Morocco and Tunisia—while retaining his appointments at Westminster. After Tricia Hillas was appointed to the episcopacy, he succeeded her as archdeacon of Westminster.

In November 2024, Ball was announced as the next director of the Anglican Centre in Rome. The person in this position, by recent custom held by a bishop, also represents the Archbishop of Canterbury in ecumenical relations with the Vatican. After a transition period, he succeeded Ian Ernest in the role in February 2025. Following the installation of Sarah Mullally as Archbishop of Canterbury, Ball was re-commissioned as her personal representative to the Holy See in April 2026.

== Personal life ==
Ball is married to Celia and they have one child.

Anglican Communion titles
| Preceded by Tricia Hillas | Archdeacon of Westminster; 2024–2025 | Succeeded by Jennifer Adams-Massmann |
| New title | Bishop of North Africa; 2024–2025 | Succeeded by Ashley Null |
| Preceded by Ian Ernest | Director of the Anglican Centre in Rome and Representative of the Archbishop of Canterbury to the Holy See; Since 2025 | Incumbent |
