= Kenneth Cragg =

Anglican bishop

The Right Reverend Kenneth Cragg
- Assistant Bishop of Jerusalem
- Church: Church of England
- Diocese: Jerusalem
- In office: 1969–1974
- Successor: Ishaq Musaad (as Bishop of Egypt)
- Other post: Acting Bishop of Egypt (1972–1974)

Orders
- Ordination: 1935 (deacon); 1937 (priest)
- Consecration: 1972

Personal details
- Born: Albert Kenneth Cragg; 8 March 1913
- Died: 13 November 2012 (aged 99)
- Denomination: Anglicanism

Albert Kenneth Cragg (8 March 1913 – 13 November 2012) was an Anglican bishop and scholar who commented widely on religious topics for more than fifty years, most notably Christian–Muslim relations.

== Early life and education ==
Cragg was born on 8 March 1913. He was educated at Blackpool Grammar School and Jesus College, Oxford. He was awarded the Grafton Scholarship in 1934.

== Ordained ministry ==
Cragg was ordained in 1937. He began his career with a curacy at Higher Tranmere Parish Church, Birkenhead after which he was Chaplain of All Saints', Beirut, Rector of Longworth, Professor of Arabic and Islamics at Hartford Seminary, Connecticut, and then Warden of St Augustine's College, Canterbury.

=== Episcopal ministry ===
Cragg was elevated to the episcopate as Assistant Bishop of Jerusalem in 1969.

There was at that time no Bishop of Egypt, and Cragg was given responsibility for the oversight of the Anglican communities in that country, until, in 1974, as a result of the reorganisation of the Anglican Church in the Middle East, a new Bishop was appointed.

He was then appointed Reader in Religious Studies, at Sussex University, following which he was Vicar of Helme (and an Assistant Bishop within the Wakefield Diocese).

In 1982, nearing the Church of England's newly laid-down compulsory retirement at the age of seventy, Cragg retired to the Diocese of Oxford.

== Personal life ==
He married, in 1940, Melita Arnold. She died in 1989.

== See also ==
- Michel Cuypers

== Works ==
- The Call of the Minaret (1956) Oxford University Press. Library of Congress Catalogue Card Number 56-8005 (1964 edition, Galaxy Books).
- Sandals at the Mosque - Christian Presence Amid ISLAM (1959) SCM Press.
- Alive to God - Muslim and Christian Prayer compiled with an Introductory Essay by Kenneth Cragg (1970) Oxford University Press, SBN 19 213220 2.
- The Event of the Qur'an - Islam in its Scripture (1971) George Allen & Unwin, ISBN 0-04-297024-5.
- The Mind of the Qur'an - Chapters in Reflection (1973) George Allen & Unwin, ISBN 0-04-297030-X.
- This Year in Jerusalem - Israel in Experience (1982) Darton, Longman & Todd, ISBN 0-232-51534-4.
- Muhammad and the Christian (1984) Darton, Longman & Todd.
- The Pen and The Faith - Eight modern Muslim writers and the Qur'an (1985) George Allen & Unwin, ISBN 0-04-297044-X.
- The Christ and the Faiths (1986) SPCK.
- Readings in the Qur'an - Selected and Translated by Kenneth Cragg (1988) Collins Liturgical Publications, ISBN 0-00-599087-4 (pbk.).
- Troubled by Truth - Life-Studies in Inter-Faith Concern (1992) Pentland Press, ISBN 1-872795-71-4.
- Returning to Mount Hira' (1992) Bellew.
- The Arab Christian - A History in the Middle East (1992) Mowbray, ISBN 0-264-67257-7.
- The Lively Credentials of God (1995) Darton, Longman & Todd.
- Palestine - The Prize and Price of Zion (1997) Cassel, ISBN 0-304-70075-4.
- Muhammad in the Qur'an - The Task and the Text (2001) Melisende, ISBN 1-901764-13-3.
- Am I not Your Lord - Human Meaning in Divine Question (2002) Melisende, ISBN 1-901764-21-4.
- The Iron in the Soul - Joseph and the Undoing of Violence (2009) Melisende, ISBN 978-1-901764-55-0.

=== Translations ===
- Hussein, Muhammad Kamel City of Wrong - A Friday in Jerusalem (1954) Cairo. Translation from Arabic published 1959 by Djambatan, Amsterdam.

Anglican Communion titles
Suspended Title last held by Francis Featherstonehaugh Johnston	Bishop of Egypt; 1969–1974	Succeeded by Ishaq Musaad
