= Alastair Redfern =

Retired Church of England bishop, who served as Bishop of Derby from 2005 to 2018

The Right Reverend Alastair Redfern
- Bishop of Derby
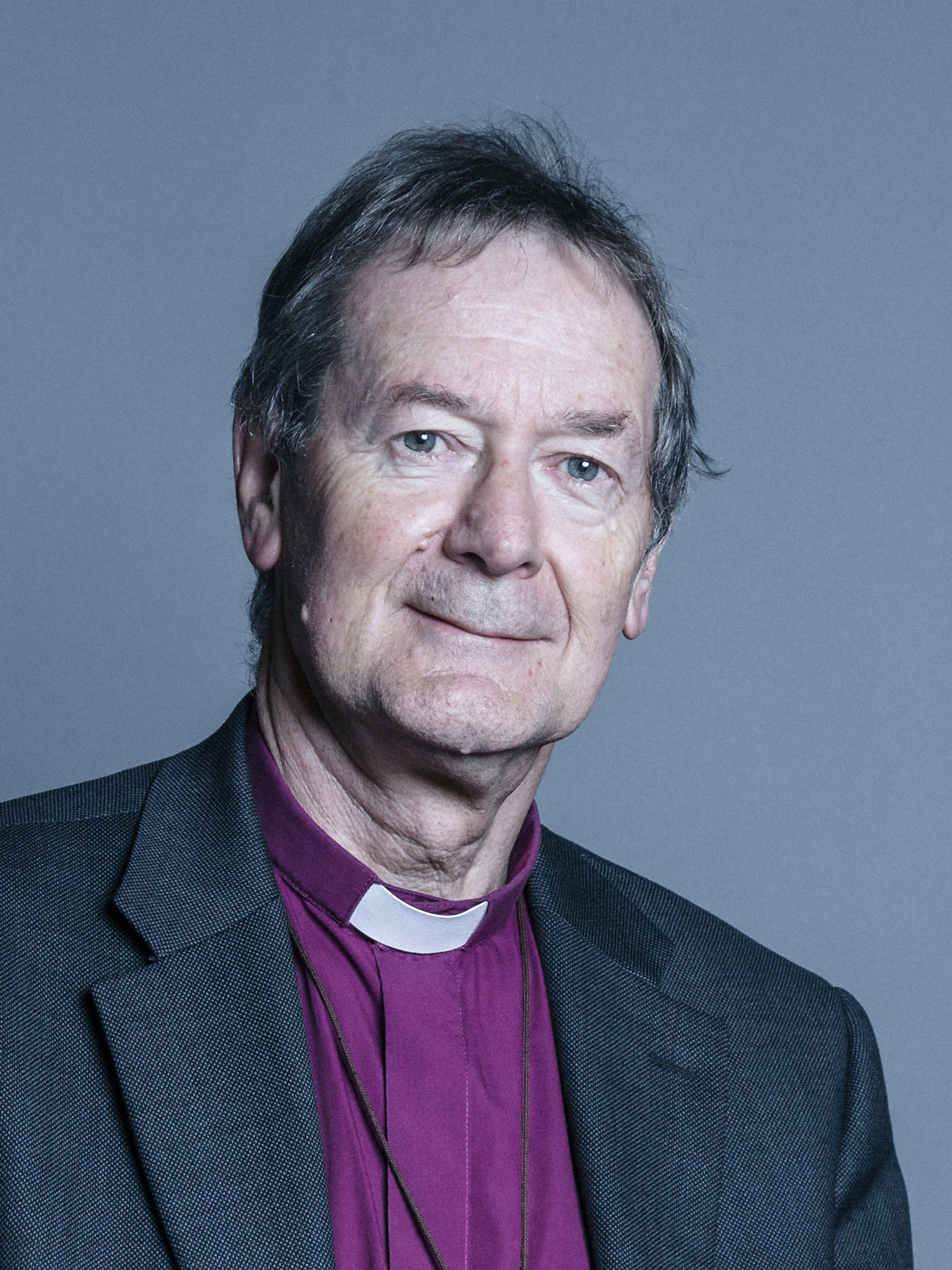
- Diocese: Diocese of Derby
- In office: 2005–2018
- Predecessor: Jonathan Bailey
- Successor: Libby Lane
- Other post: Bishop of Grantham (1997–2005)

Orders
- Ordination: 1976 (deacon); 1977 (priest) by Kenneth Skelton
- Consecration: 1997 by George Carey

Personal details
- Born: 1 September 1948 (age 78)
- Denomination: Anglican
- Spouse: Jane (m. 1974; died 2004) Caroline (m. 2006)
- Children: two
- Profession: Lecturer, writer
- Education: Christ Church, Oxford

Member of the House of Lords
- Lord Spiritual
- Bishop of Derby; 15 June 2010 – 31 August 2018

Alastair Llewellyn John Redfern (born 1 September 1948) is a retired Church of England bishop, who served as Bishop of Derby from 2005 to 2018.

== Early life and education ==
Redfern studied at Christ Church, Oxford. He received a Doctor of Philosophy (PhD) degree in 2001 from the University of Bristol. His doctoral thesis was titled "Oversight and authority in the nineteenth century church of England: a case study of Bishop Samuel Wilberforce".

== Ordained ministry ==
Redfern was ordained a deacon at Petertide 1976 (27 June) and a priest the following Petertide (26 June 1977), both times by Kenneth Skelton, Bishop of Lichfield, at Lichfield Cathedral. He served as a curate in Wolverhampton. He then became a lecturer and later vice principal of Ripon College Cuddesdon. He was also an honorary curate of Church of All Saints, Cuddesdon between 1983 and 1987. From 1987 to 1997 he was the Canon Theologian of Bristol Cathedral.

=== Episcopal ministry ===
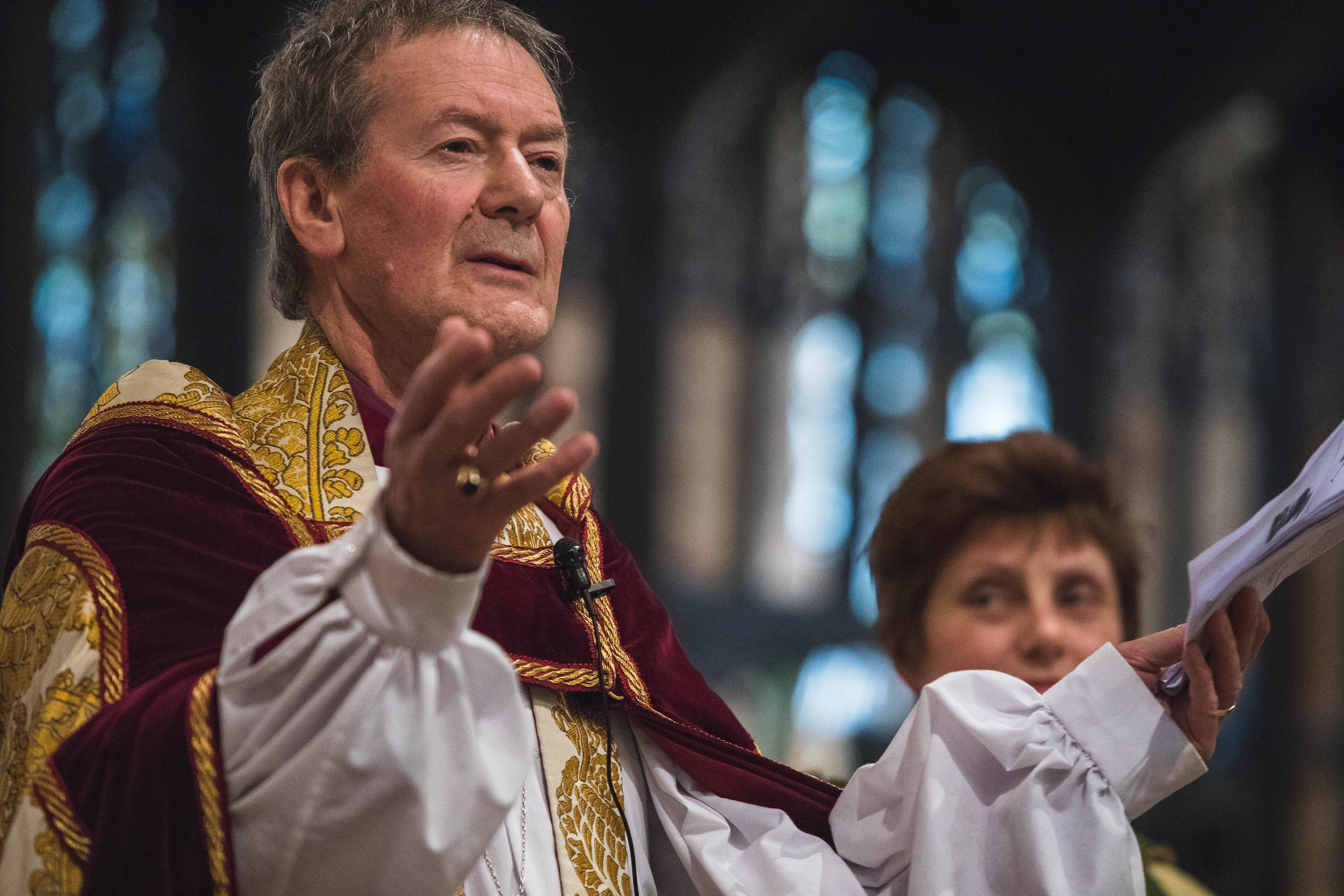
Bishop Redfern in 2018

He was ordained and consecrated to the episcopate on 2 December 1997 at Southwark Cathedral (by George Carey, Archbishop of Canterbury) to become suffragan Bishop of Grantham. In 2005, he was translated to be the Bishop of Derby. He was a Member (Lord Spiritual) of the House of Lords from 2010 to 2018.

Redfern retired effective 31 August 2018.

== Personal life ==
In 1974, Redfern married Jane Valerie Straw. Together they had two daughters. His first wife died in 2004. In 2006, he married Caroline Boddington. who at the time worked for the Church of England as the Archbishops' Secretary for Appointments. She retired in 2021.

== Styles ==
- The Reverend Alastair Redfern (1976–1987)
- The Reverend Canon Alastair Redfern (1987–1997)
- The Right Reverend Alastair Redfern (1997–2001)
- The Right Reverend Doctor Alastair Redfern (2001–present)

Church of England titles
Preceded by Bill Ind	Bishop of Grantham; 1997–2005	Succeeded by Tim Ellis
Preceded by Jonathan Bailey	Bishop of Derby; 2005–2018	Succeeded by Libby Lane
