= Peter Dawes =

Church of England bishop (1928–2022)

The Rt Revd Peter Dawes
- Bishop of Derby
- Diocese: Diocese of Derby
- In office: 1988–1995
- Predecessor: Cyril Bowles
- Successor: Jonathan Bailey
- Other post: Archdeacon of West Ham (1980–1988)

Orders
- Ordination: 1955
- Consecration: 1988

Personal details
- Born: 5 February 1928
- Died: 10 November 2022 (aged 94)
- Denomination: Anglican
- Spouse: Ethel Dawes
- Children: 4
- Education: Hatfield College, Durham

Peter Spencer Dawes (5 February 1928 – 10 November 2022) was a British Anglican cleric who served as Bishop of Derby from 1988 to 1995.

== Early life and education ==
Dawes was educated at Aldenham School. He studied theology at Durham University, graduating with first-class honours, and then trained for holy orders at Tyndale Hall, Bristol.

== Career ==
Dawes was ordained in 1955 and served his first curacies at St Andrew's, Whitehall Park, and St Ebbe's, Oxford.

He was appointed a tutor at Clifton Theological College in 1960, where he developed a reputation as a "lively teacher" and "gifted communicator". He became vicar of the Good Shepherd, Romford in 1965, and was first elected to the General Synod of the Church of England in 1970. A supporter of electoral reform, in 1976 he successfully proposed a Synod resolution calling for the replacement of first-past-the-post with the single transferable vote.

He was Archdeacon of West Ham from 1980 to 1988.

In 1988, Dawes was consecrated Bishop of Derby by Archbishop Runcie, succeeding Cyril Bowles. He played an active role in preparing his diocese for the first ordinations and appointments of women priests. He retired in 1995.

== Personal life ==
Dawes was married to Ethel, who predeceased him. They had two sons and two daughters.

Dawes died on 10 November 2022, at the age of 94.

Church of England titles
Preceded by Cyril Bowles	Bishop of Derby; 1988–1995	Succeeded by Jonathan Bailey
