= Kuan Kim Seng =

Singaporean dean

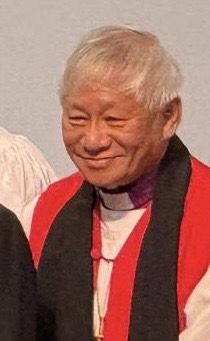
Kuan in 2025

Kuan Kim Seng is the first Bishop of the Horn of Africa in the Province of Alexandria, part of the worldwide Anglican Communion, to which office he was consecrated on the creation of the Diocese in 2020. Before becoming the diocesan bishop, Kuan Kim Seng served as a commissary bishop the Horn of Africa, in what was the Diocese of Egypt with North Africa and the Horn of Africa.

Bishop Kuan is Singaporean and served most of his career in Singapore. Previously he was one of two assistant bishops of the Anglican Diocese of Singapore in the Church of the Province of Southeast Asia and had served as Dean of Singapore. and as the vicar of the Chapel of the Resurrection in Singapore.

== Publications ==
- Our duty and our joy, Armour Publishing Pte Ltd, 2007, ISBN 978-9814222280
