= Edmund Pearce =

British bishop (1870–1935)

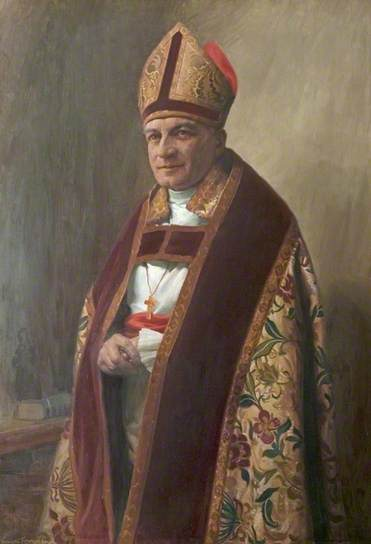
Dr Pearce (1870–1935) Bishop of Derby by Ernest Townsend

Edmund Courtenay Pearce (17 December 1870 – 13 October 1935) was the inaugural Bishop of Derby from 1927 until his death. His brother Ernest was the Bishop of Worcester from 1919 to 1930.

Born on 17 December 1870 and educated at Christ's Hospital and Corpus Christi College, Cambridge, he was ordained in 1899. His career began with a curacy at St James, Muswell Hill. He was then Vicar of St Bene't's, Cambridge, Dean, then Master of his old college and finally (before his elevation to the episcopate) Vice-Chancellor of the University. He died while taking a confirmation service near Glossop.

== Notes ==
Academic offices
Preceded by Robert Caldwell	Master of Corpus Christi College, Cambridge; 1914–1927	Succeeded by William Spens
Preceded by Peter Giles	Vice-Chancellor of the University of Cambridge; 1921–1922	Succeeded by Albert Seward
Church of England titles
New diocese	Bishop of Derby; 1927–1935	Succeeded by Alfred Rawlinson
