= Cyril Bowles =

English Anglican bishop

Cyril William Johnston Bowles (9 May 1916 – 14 September 1999) was the fourth Bishop of Derby, from 1969 to 1988.

He was educated at Brentwood School and Cambridge University, he was made deacon at Advent 1939 (18 December) and ordained priest the next Advent (22 December 1940) — both times by Henry Wilson, Bishop of Chelmsford at Chelmsford Cathedral. His career began with a curacy at Barking Parish Church. Following this he was Chaplain at Ridley Hall, Cambridge and after that Vice Principal and then Principal. Finally, before his appointment to the episcopate, he was Archdeacon of Swindon. He was consecrated a bishop by Michael Ramsey, Archbishop of Canterbury on All Saints' Day 1969 (1 November) at Westminster Abbey.

Church of England titles
Preceded by Geoffrey Allen	Bishop of Derby; 1969–1988	Succeeded by Peter Dawes
