= Episcopal/Anglican Province of Alexandria =

Province of the Anglican communion

- Classification: Protestant (with various theological and doctrinal identities, including Anglo-Catholic, Liberal, Evangelical)
- Orientation: Anglican
- Scripture: Holy Bible
- Theology: Anglican doctrine
- Polity: Episcopal
- Primate: Samy Fawzy
- Dioceses: 4
- Associations: Anglican Communion, Global South, GAFCON
- Territory: Egypt, Ethiopia, Eritrea, Somalia, Djibouti, Algeria, Tunisia, Libya
- Branched from: Episcopal Church in Jerusalem and the Middle East
- Members: 50,000

The Episcopal/Anglican Province of Alexandria is a province of the Anglican Communion. Its territory was formerly the Diocese of Egypt with North Africa and the Horn of Africa. On 29 June 2020 the diocese was elevated to the status of an ecclesiastical province, and became the forty-first province of the Anglican Communion. The primate and metropolitan of the province is the Archbishop of Alexandria.

Its jurisdiction extends over North Africa and the Horn of Africa, a vast region encompassing the nations of Algeria, Tunisia, Libya, Egypt, Ethiopia, Eritrea, Somalia, and Djibouti. The province claims 50,000 members.

== History ==
=== Foundation ===
The first Anglican missionaries arrived in Egypt in 1819, and the first church building, St Mark's in Alexandria, was consecrated in 1839, followed by All Saints' in Cairo in 1876. Egypt became part of the Diocese of Jerusalem, founded in 1841, and under the metropolitical authority of the Archbishop of Canterbury.

Many churches, schools, medical clinics, and hospitals were established by the Anglican community in Egypt and the surrounding territories, and in 1908 the Rev'd Llewellyn Gwynne was consecrated Bishop of Khartoum, a suffragan bishop to the bishop of Jerusalem, to lead the Anglican community across north Africa. In 1920 the region was formed into a new diocese named the Diocese of Egypt and the Sudan, with Gwynne as the first diocesan bishop in Egypt and the Sudan.

The cathedral of the diocese was located at Khartoum, but St Mary's Church in Cairo was made a pro-cathedral for Egypt until 1938, when the new All Saints' Cathedral in Cairo was opened and consecrated.

=== Division of diocese ===
The diocese was divided in 1945, to form the two separate dioceses. The bishop and the cathedral at Khartoum both continued with the new Diocese of the Sudan. The pro-cathedral in Cairo became the cathedral of the new Diocese of Egypt, and Bishop Geoffrey Allen became the first bishop in Egypt.

Owing to the complex political situation in Egypt, the diocese (still under the authority of the Archbishop of Canterbury as metropolitan) sought to distance itself from the Church of England, by adopting the denominational name "Episcopal Church in Egypt". Nonetheless, political tensions led to the seizing or destruction of many Anglican churches and properties in Egypt, and the expulsion of many British clergy. By 1956 there was no resident bishop, and only four priests in the entire diocese, with episcopal supervision temporarily provided by the archbishop in Jerusalem.

=== Provincial restructuring ===
In 1976 the new Episcopal Church in Jerusalem and the Middle East was formed, uniting four dioceses (including Egypt) into a new province. Jerusalem was reduced from an archbishopric to a bishopric, and the province was to be led by a presiding bishop, elected by rotation from amongst the four diocesan bishops of Jerusalem, Egypt, Cyprus, and Iran. In 1978, All Saints' Cathedral in Cairo was destroyed on the orders of the Egyptian Government. A new cathedral in Cairo was constructed and consecrated in 1988, with its architectural style modelled on a Bedouin tent.

=== Expansion ===
As the Diocese of Egypt grew in the early twenty-first century, the bishop established two episcopal areas, appointing an area bishop for the Horn of Africa in 2007, and an area bishop for North Africa in 2009. Following a huge expansion of mission activity in the Gambela Region, a further episcopal area was created in 2019, with Rajan Vincent Jacob, already serving as Archdeacon of Gambella, consecrated as the first area bishop of Gambella.

The continued expansion led the diocese to seek authority to separate from the Episcopal Church in Jerusalem and the Middle East and form an autonomous province of the Anglican Communion. This was approved in 2019 by the synod of the province, and in January 2020 by the Anglican Communion Primates' Meetings. The new Province of Alexandria was formed on 29 June 2020, with the former "Diocese of Egypt with North Africa and the Horn of Africa" split into four new dioceses.

Anthony James Ball (born 1968) was consecrated a bishop on 30 November 2021, to serve as an assistant bishop throughout the province. On 30 November 2023, he became Bishop of North Africa.

== Archbishop ==
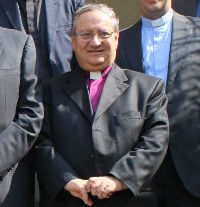
Mouneer Anis, the first Archbishop of Alexandria in the Anglican Communion

The Archbishop of Alexandria is the senior cleric of the Episcopal/Anglican Province of Alexandria. He is the primate and metropolitan of the province, and the ordinary of the Diocese of Egypt.

== Dioceses ==
=== Diocese of Egypt ===
The diocese has a cathedral in Cairo and a pro-cathedral in Alexandria. The current bishop, Samy Fawzy, hitherto coadjutor bishop of the diocese, was installed as Bishop of Egypt and Archbishop of Alexandria on 8 June 2021.

==== Bishops ====
The bishops have been:

- Llewellyn Gwynne (1920–1946) (Bishop in Egypt and the Sudan)
  - Assistant bishop: Morris Gelsthorpe
- Geoffrey Allen (1947–1952) (Bishop in Egypt)
- Francis Johnston (1952–1958) (Bishop in Egypt)
- Administered by Campbell MacInnes (1959–1969) (Archbishop of Jerusalem) during temporary suspension
- Kenneth Cragg (1969–1974) (Bishop in Egypt)
- Ishaq Musaad (1974–1984) (Bishop in Egypt)
- Ghais Abdel Malik (1985–2000) (Bishop in Egypt)
- Mouneer Anis (2000–2020) (Bishop in Egypt and North Africa)

==== Archbishops ====
The diocesan bishops following the creation of the new smaller diocese in 2020, and concurrently metropolitan archbishops of the province:

- Mouneer Anis (2020–2021) (Archbishop of Alexandria and Bishop of Egypt)
- Samy Fawzy, (2021–present) (Archbishop of Alexandria and Bishop of Egypt)

==== Churches ====
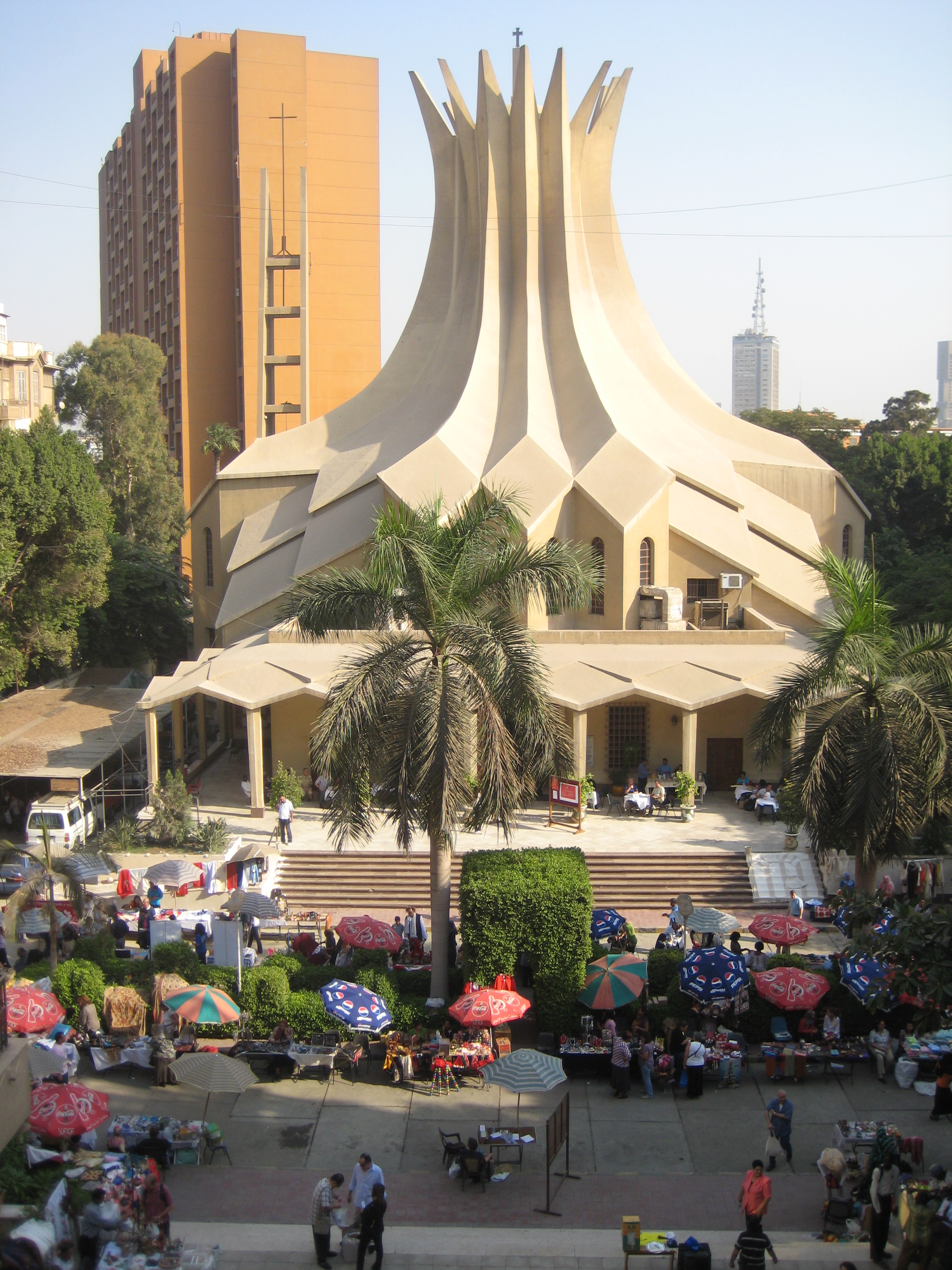
All Saints' Cathedral, Cairo

Parish churches of the diocese include:

- St. Mark's Pro-Cathedral, Alexandria
- Christ the King Church, Ras el Soda, Alexandria
- All Saints' Church, Stanley Bay, Alexandria
- All Saints' Cathedral, Zamalek, Cairo
- Jesus Light of the World Church, Old Cairo
- Church for the Deaf, Old Cairo
- Church of the Good Shepherd, Heliopolis, Cairo
- St. John the Baptist Church, Maadi, Greater Cairo
- Church of the Good Shepherd, Giza, Greater Cairo
- St. Mark's Church, Menouf
- St Paul's Church, Ezbit en Nakhl
- Church of our Saviour, Suez
- Church of the Epiphany, Port Said

There are significant congregations without permanent buildings in Sadat City, 6th of October City, and Hurghada.

=== Diocese of North Africa ===
The diocese is under the direction of its former area bishop, Samy Fawzy (consecrated 27 February 2017), who is also Dean of the Pro-Cathedral in Alexandria, and coadjutor bishop of the Diocese of Egypt. The diocese covers Libya, Tunisia, and Algeria.

As an episcopal area of the former Diocese of Egypt with North Africa and the Horn of Africa, the area bishops were:

- Bill Musk (2008–2015)
- Samy Fawzy (2017–2020)

Diocesan bishops:

- Anthony Ball (January 2024 to January 2025)
- Ashley Null (since May 2025)

Significant churches include:

- Christ the King Church, Tripoli, Libya
- St George's Anglican Church, Tunis, Tunisia
- Holy Trinity Anglican Church, Algiers, Algeria

=== Diocese of the Horn of Africa ===
The diocese works in Djibouti, Eritrea, Ethiopia, and Somalia.

As an episcopal area of the former Diocese of Egypt with North Africa and the Horn of Africa, the area bishops were:

- Andrew Proud (2007–2011)
- Grant LeMarquand (2012–2018)
- Kuan Kim Seng (2019–2020)

The diocesan bishops, following the creation of the diocese in 2020:

- Kuan Kim Seng (2020–2024)
- Martin Gordon Reakes-Williams (2024-present)

The most significant church in the new diocese is:

- St. Matthew's Anglican Church, Addis Ababa, Ethiopia

=== Diocese of Gambella ===
The Gambella (sometimes spelt Gambela) Region of Ethiopia has more than 70 Anglican congregations, and a theological college (St Frumentius Theological College) training candidates for ordination.

The new diocese has a large number of congregations, but very few church buildings. There are eleven regional mission centres. In June 2020, at the foundation of the Province of Alexandria and the Diocese of Gambella, Josiah Idowu-Fearon, Secretary General of the Anglican Consultative Council, drew particular attention to the "enormous growth" in the area, "particularly in the Gambella region of Ethiopia".

As an episcopal area of the former Diocese of Egypt with North Africa and the Horn of Africa, the area bishop was:

- Rajan Vincent Jacob (2019–2020)

The diocesan bishops, following the creation of the diocese in 2020:

- Rajan Vincent Jacob (2020–present)

== Theological colleges ==
The province operates three theological colleges for the training of ordained clergy and lay readers, as well as some theological education for other lay leaders.

=== Alexandria School of Theology ===
The Alexandria School of Theology was inaugurated in 2003, and began educating students in 2006. The college is located in the Diocese of Egypt, and operates across two campuses, one in Alexandria (on the site St Mark's pro-cathedral), and the other in Cairo (on the site of All Saints' Cathedral). Ordination candidates follow a three-year Diploma in Theology & Ministry course. The college also offers academic degree courses leading to the degrees of Bachelor of Theology and Master of Theology. The College is under the patronage of Saint Athanasius of Alexandria.

=== St Cyprian College, Tunis ===
The college is located in the Diocese of North Africa. Launched in 2012 under the direction of Bishop Bill Musk, it was originally a local remote-learning and lay-training project, which developed by 2015 into the St Cyprian Centre with campus facilities adjacent to St George's Church in Tunis. Working with the established Alexandria School of Theology (AST), the centre became St Cyprian College in 2018. It offers a Diploma in Theology & Ministry for ordination candidates and other church leaders, and students can also access the degree programmes of the AST through the college. The college is under the patronage of Saint Cyprian.

=== St Frumentius Theological College, Gambella ===
The college is located in the Diocese of Gambella, and also provides training for the Diocese of the Horn of Africa. It opened in 2015, and provides training for church leaders across Ethiopia. The college uses the tag line "A College of the Anglican Church in Ethiopia". Students training for ordination follow the full-time three-year Diploma in Theology & Ministry. There is also a six-year (part-time) Diploma in Pastoral Ministry aimed at a range of lay leadership roles within the church.

At the launch of the college in 2015 Anis said "I believe that St. Frumentius’ College will transform the Church in the Horn of Africa, as we seek to develop a mature and fully indigenous church". The college is under the patronage of Saint Frumentius of Ethiopia.

== See also ==
- Christianity in Egypt
- List of Anglican dioceses
- Church Missionary Society in the Middle East and North Africa
