= Geoffrey Allen (bishop) =

Bishop of Derby; Bishop of Egypt

- Bishop of Derby
- Allen in July 1959.
- Diocese: Diocese of Derby
- In office: 1959–1969 (ret.)
- Predecessor: Alfred Rawlinson
- Successor: Cyril Bowles
- Other posts: Archdeacon of Birmingham (1944–1947); Bishop in Egypt (1947–1952); Principal of Ripon Hall and Assistant Bishop of Oxford (1952–1959)

Orders
- Ordination: 1927
- Consecration: 1947

Personal details
- Born: 25 August 1902
- Died: 8 November 1982 (aged 80)
- Denomination: Anglican
- Education: University College, Oxford

Geoffrey Francis Allen (25 August 1902 – 8 November 1982) was the third Bishop of Derby.

Allen was educated at Dulwich College and University College, Oxford, and after training at Ripon Hall was ordained in 1927. Following a brief curacy at St Saviour's, Liverpool, he was Chaplain of his old theological college, a Fellow of Lincoln College, Oxford, Lecturer at Union Theological College, Canton, the Deputy Provost of St Philip's Cathedral, Birmingham and then Archdeacon of Birmingham, 1944–47.

He was elevated to the episcopate as Bishop in Egypt in 1947. Returning to England following his resignation in late July 1952, he became Principal of Ripon Hall that December. During his time at Ripon, he was appointed an Assistant Bishop of Oxford. He was appointed to the See of Derby, where he served until 1969; he was elected and confirmed some time prior to his installation at Derby Cathedral on 4 July 1959.

Anglican Communion titles
Preceded by Llewellyn Gwynne	Bishop in Egypt; 1947–1952	Succeeded by Francis Johnston
Church of England titles
Preceded by Alfred Rawlinson	Bishop of Derby; 1959–1969	Succeeded by Cyril Bowles
