= Llewellyn Gwynne =

Welsh Anglican bishop

The Right Reverend Llewellyn Gwynne CMG CBE
- Bishop of Egypt and Sudan
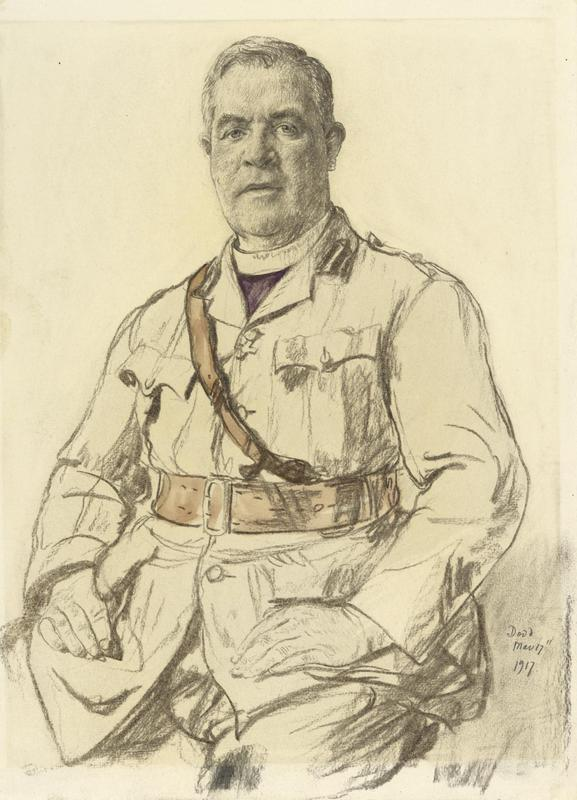
- In office: 1920 to 1946
- Successor: Geoffrey Allen
- Other posts: Deputy Chaplain General, British Army (1915–1919)

Personal details
- Born: Llewellyn Henry Gwynne; 11 June 1863
- Died: 9 December 1957 (aged 94)
- Denomination: Anglicanism

Llewellyn Henry Gwynne CMG CBE (11 June 1863 – 9 December 1957) was a Welsh Anglican bishop and missionary. He was the first Anglican Bishop of Egypt and Sudan, serving from 1920 to 1946.

== Early life ==
Llewellyn Henry Gwynne was born in Britain on 11 June 1863, in Swansea, South Wales. While he was a pupil at the Bishop Gore School (Swansea Grammar School), his headmaster encouraged him to follow the example of his brother Charlie by working hard and pursuing his interest in the Bible.

Ordained in 1886, he was curate at St Chad Derby and St Andrew Nottingham. He was then vicar of Emmanuel Church, Nottingham from 1892 to 1899. He also played football for Derby County.

He began his overseas career in 1899 as a Christian missionary in east Africa. In 1905 Gwynne was appointed archdeacon for the Sudan; and in 1908 he was consecrated suffragan Bishop of Khartoum, under George Blyth.

Recalled to Europe in World War I, Llewellyn joined the army as chaplain. In July 1915 he was appointed deputy chaplain-general of the army in France, with the relative rank of major-general, serving until May 1919.

== Bishop of Egypt and the Sudan ==
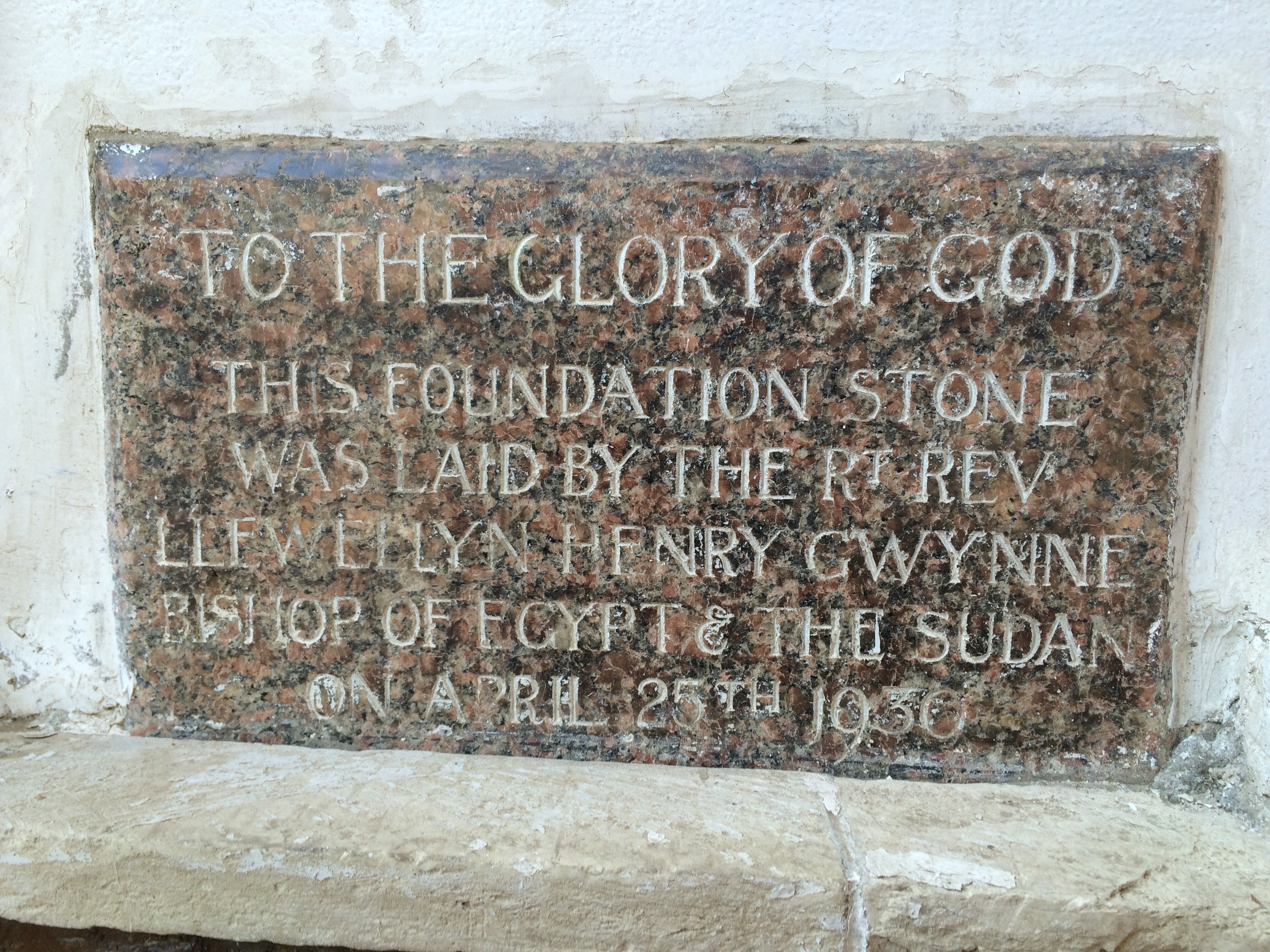
Foundation stone in Aswan laid by Llewellyn Gwynne in 1930

Bishop Llewellyn Gwynne returned to the Sudan in 1919. In 1920, he became the bishop of the new Anglican diocese of Egypt and the Sudan. He became a resident in Cairo, Egypt and would come to the Sudan on visits. In 1924 Gwynne held the first Annual Unity Service in Khartoum Cathedral. In 1926 Gwynne and the Mufti (the religious head of Moslems) stood together to bless the new Sennar Dam. He founded the Unity High School in Khartoum, and the school was officially opened in 1928. In 1929 he dedicated the first church building at Atbarah Railway Station. In 1930 Bishop Gwynne laid the foundation stone for the Church of St. John the Baptist in Maadi, Cairo and in 1937 laid the foundation stone of a lepers' church in Lui.

Bishop Gwynne was in Britain at the outbreak of World War II but returned to the Sudan in September 1942. He retired as bishop of Egypt and Sudan in 1946 when he went back to England.

He died on 9 December 1957 at the age of ninety-four. His pectoral cross is on display at the Museum of Army Chaplaincy.

== Bibliography ==
- Howson, Peter. The First World War Diaries of the Rt. Rev. Llewellyn Gwynne, July 1915 – July 1916. (2019. Woodbridge: The Boydell Press)
- Jackson, H. C. Pastor on the Nile. (1960. London: SPCK)
- Vantini, Giovanni. Christianity in the Sudan. (1981. Bologna: EMI Publishers)

== See also ==
Charles Studd

Anglican Communion titles
New diocese	Bishop of Egypt; 1920–1946	Succeeded by Geoffrey Francis Allen
