= Bishop of Derby =

Diocesan bishop in the Church of England

The Bishop of Derby is the Ordinary of the Church of England Diocese of Derby in the Province of Canterbury.

The diocese was formed from part of the Diocese of Southwell in 1927 under George V and roughly covers the county of Derbyshire. Before this time however there had been two bishops suffragan of Derby whilst the town was still within the Diocese of Southwell.

The bishop's seat (cathedra) or see is located in the City of Derby at Derby Cathedral – formerly the parish church of All Saints, which was elevated to cathedral status in 1927. The bishop's residence is the Bishop's House, Duffield.

The current bishop is Libby Lane, since the confirmation on 11 February 2019 of her election.

== List of bishops ==
Bishops of Derby
From	Until	Incumbent	Notes
1927	1936	Edmund Pearce	Previously Master of Corpus Christi College, Cambridge.
1936	1959	Alfred Rawlinson	Previously Archdeacon of Auckland.
1959	1969	Geoffrey Allen	Previously Principal of Cuddesdon College.
1969	1988	Cyril Bowles	Previously Archdeacon of Swindon.
1988	1995	Peter Dawes	Previously Archdeacon of West Ham.
1995	2005	Jonathan Bailey	Translated from Dunwich; also Clerk of the Closet from 1997.
2005	2018	Alastair Redfern	Translated from Grantham; retired 31 August 2018.
2018	2019	Jan McFarlane, Bishop of Repton	Acting diocesan bishop.
2019	present	Libby Lane	Translated from Stockport; installed 25 May 2019.

== Assistant bishops ==
Among those who have served as assistant bishops of the diocese have been:

- 1936 – 1937 (d.): Philip Crick, Vicar of Ashbourne and former Bishop of Rockhampton and of Ballarat
- 1937 – 1941 (d.): Edward Every, Rector of Egginton; retired Bishop of the Falkland Islands and of Argentina
- 1941 – 1953 (res.): Ronald O'Ferrall, Rector of Walton on Trent until 1944, Vicar of Repton and Foremark (1944–1947), Provost of Derby thereafter; former Bishop in Madagascar and later Assistant Bishop of Gloucester
- 1954–1962: George Sinker, Vicar of Bakewell and former Bishop in Nagpur
- 1962 – 1984 (d.): Tom Parfitt, Rector of Matlock with Tansley (until 1980) and former Bishop in Madagascar
- 1979 – 1980 (res.): George Briggs, assistant priest in Matlock with Tansley and former Bishop of The Seychelles
