= Samy Fawzy =

Egyptian Anglican bishop

The Most Reverend Samy Fawzy Shehata
- Archbishop of Alexandria
- Native name: سامي فوزي شحاتة
- Church: Episcopal/Anglican Province of Alexandria
- In office: 2021–present
- Predecessor: Mouneer Anis
- Other post: Bishop of Egypt (2021–present)
- Previous posts: Dean of Alexandria; Area Bishop for North Africa

Orders
- Ordination: 1990 (deacon); 1991 (priesthood)
- Consecration: February 27, 2017 by Mouneer Anis

Personal details
- Born: 1963 (age 62–63) Cairo

Samy Fawzy Shehata (Arabic: سامي فوزي شحاتة) (born 1963) is an Egyptian Anglican bishop. He is the second archbishop and primate of the Episcopal/Anglican Province of Alexandria, the 41st province of the Anglican Communion.

== Early life, career and education ==
Fawzy was born in Cairo in 1963. He studied engineering, graduating from Cairo University in 1985. In 1988, he went to the University of Wales to study for his theology diploma, graduating in 1991. He was ordained to the diaconate at All Saints Cathedral in 1990 and to the priesthood in 1991.

Fawzy began his ordained work in Alexandria as assistant chaplain. From 1994 to 1997, he was assistant to Bishop Ghais Malik. Fawzy then engaged in advanced studies in theology at the University of Birmingham, completing his master's degree in 1998 and his Ph.D. in 2002.

== Leadership in Egypt ==
Fawzy returned to Egypt to serve as a pastor in Alexandria. In 2005, he was appointed a lecturer at the Alexandria School of Theology, the Diocese of Egypt's seminary. He became dean of St. Mark's Pro-Cathedral in Alexandria in 2009, and took on an additional role as director of the Alexandria School of Theology in 2012. In 2016, he was appointed to the Archbishop of Canterbury's Anglican Communion Task Group.

Fawzy was elevated to the episcopate in 2017, when he was consecrated to serve as area bishop for North Africa, the part of the diocese encompassing Algeria, Libya and Tunisia. He represented the Anglican Church in ecumenical dialogues with the Coptic Orthodox Church and also in interfaith dialogues with Al-Azhar University. In June 2021, Fawzy succeeded Mouneer Anis as both bishop of Egypt and archbishop of Alexandria.

== Anglican realignment ==
Like his predecessor as archbishop, Fawzy has been a voice for unity and reconciliation within the Anglican Communion while still holding firmly to the traditional doctrine of marriage. Fawzy has sought to maintain relations with the instruments of communion, including attending the 2022 Lambeth Conference (which was boycotted by other traditionalist bishops), where he received a primatial cross from Archbishop of Canterbury Justin Welby. He also served on the board of the Living Church Foundation, the publisher of a magazine based in the Episcopal Church and focused on minimizing the divides within Anglicanism. However, Fawzy has also built ties with Anglican realignment groups like the Global Fellowship of Confessing Anglicans.

Fawzy has emphasized the role of a "covenantal" structure for Anglicanism based on the classic formularies of the Thirty-Nine Articles of Religion, the 1662 Book of Common Prayer and the Ordinal. He served on the Global South Fellowship of Anglican Churches study group that prepared a covenantal structure in 2019 designed to create greater accountability and discipline among Anglican churches than existed in the Communion's instruments. The Province of Alexandria became one of the signatories to the GSFA covenant.

In February 2023, as the General Synod of the Church of England debated whether to authorize the "Prayers of Love and Faith" for use with people in same-sex relationships, Fawzy was invited to speak to the Synod as a guest. Citing Resolution 1:10 from the 1998 Lambeth Conference, he urged the Synod not to move forward with same-sex blessings:

In our understanding of marriage and sexuality there is a red line we will never cross. Crossing this line of blessing same-sex unions will alienate 75 percent of the Anglican Communion and endanger the ecumenical and interfaith dialogue. This shift in practice will lead eventually to impaired and broken communion. We inherited the traditional orthodox faith of the Church of England. Please do not surrender your unique position as the mother church of the Anglican Communion.

The synod ultimately voted to welcome the Church of England bishops’ "proposal to provide prayers to bless same-sex unions in church — but with a last-minute clarification that their use would not contradict the Church’s current teaching on marriage." In response, Fawzy and other Global South primates issued the "Ash Wednesday Statement," in which they declared that the "Church of England has departed from the historic faith passed down from the Apostles by this innovation in the liturgies of the Church and her pastoral practice" and that "she has disqualified herself from leading the Communion as the historic 'Mother' Church." The Global South primates also expressed their commitment to "reset the Communion on its biblical foundation" and committed to "provide Primatial and episcopal oversight to orthodox dioceses and networks of Anglican churches who indicate their need and who consult with us." Fawzy also attended the 2023 Global Anglican Future Conference in Kigali, which issued a similar statement. In the fall of 2023, Fawzy hosted the Global South leadership in Cairo, where GSFA's June 2024 assembly was held. Under Fawzy's leadership, the GSFA secretariat was also relocated to Cairo.

== Personal life ==
Fawzy is married to Madeleine, and they have two adult sons.

Anglican Communion titles
Preceded by Mouneer Anis	Bishop of Egypt; 2021–present	Incumbent
Preceded by Mouneer Anis	Archbishop of Alexandria; 2021–present	Incumbent
