= Jonathan Bailey (bishop) =

English Anglican bishop (1940–2008)

The Right Reverend Jonathan Bailey KCVO
- Bishop of Derby
- Diocese: Diocese of Derby
- In office: 1995–2005
- Predecessor: Peter Dawes
- Successor: Alastair Redfern
- Other posts: Archdeacon of Southend (1982–1992); Bishop of Dunwich (1992–1995); Clerk of the Closet (1997–2005); Honorary assistant bishop in Gloucester (2005–2008)

Orders
- Ordination: 1965 (deacon); 1966 (priest)
- Consecration: 1992

Personal details
- Born: Jonathan Sansbury Bailey; 24 February 1940
- Died: 9 December 2008 (aged 68)
- Denomination: Anglican
- Spouse: Susan Bailey (née Bennett-Jones; m. 1965)
- Children: 3 sons
- Education: Trinity College, Cambridge

Member of the House of Lords
- Lord Spiritual
- Bishop of Derby; 30 November 1999 – 31 May 2005

Jonathan Sansbury Bailey, KCVO (24 February 1940 – 9 December 2008) was an English Anglican bishop. He was Bishop of Dunwich from 1992 to 1995, Bishop of Derby from 1995 to 2005, and Clerk of the Closet from 1997 to 2005.

== Early life ==
He was educated at Quarry Bank High School, Liverpool, and Trinity College, Cambridge, where he initially graduated in history before further study in the Divinity School, followed by ordination training at Ridley Hall, Cambridge. His ministerial training included a year as a shift labourer in a steel mill. Ordination as deacon in 1965 then priest in 1966 was to the parish of Sutton, St Helens. Next came three years at St Paul, Warrington the base for the Industrial Mission in the Liverpool Diocese. In 1971 he was appointed the first priest warden of Marrick Priory Residential Youth Centre in Swaledale North Yorkshire, using both the opportunities for outdoor pursuits and a mediaeval chapel, the Centre still offers facilities and programmes for individuals, church groups, schools and colleges.

== Priestly ministry ==
In 1976 he was appointed Vicar of Wetherby, a growing market and commuter town set between Leeds, York, and Harrogate. The post included chaplaincies to HM Borstal Wetherby, where he inaugurated delivery of the chaplaincy by an ecumenical team, and Wharfe Grange Hospital. He chaired the governors of Wetherby High School and was founder chairman of the Wetherby Arts Festival which celebrated its thirtieth anniversary in 2007.

In 1982, John Trillo, Bishop of Chelmsford, appointed him Archdeacon of Southend and his Adviser for Industry and Commerce. The latter brought with it the post of Development Officer for the Essex Churches Council for Industry and Commerce, heading up an ecumenical team of a dozen or more industrial chaplains. He served the diocese as chairman of the statutory Board of Education. During this time he served nationally as a member of the Council for the Care of Churches. Along with two colleagues he shared an initiative to establish and deliver induction training for new archdeacons which developed into a continuing programme of in-service training.

== Episcopal career ==
In 1992 he was appointed Bishop of Dunwich. From then until 2001 he chaired the Finance Committee of the Advisory Board of Ministry with responsibility for raising a budget and the funding of ordination colleges, courses and students.

In 1995 he was appointed Bishop of Derby serving the territory of the City and County until retirement in 2005. Throughout that decade he was a director of the Derby City Partnership and a member of the Governing Council of Derby University, where he was also chairman of the Multi-Faith Centre. In 2006 the University awarded him an honorary doctorate. He took his seat in the House of Lords in 1999. From 2002 he chaired the Churches Main Committee bringing together the mainstream churches and denominations as a liaison body between them and the machinery of government.

From 1997 until his retirement in 2005 he served as Clerk of the Closet to the Royal Household, an ancient title applied to the senior domestic chaplain to the British monarch. Although a largely honorary post (the Deputy Clerk to the Closet carries out the actual duties of domestic chaplaincy), the post does involve presenting new Bishops to the monarch, and recommending names for possible appointment as royal chaplains and priests-in-ordinary.

He was made a Knight Commander of the Royal Victorian Order (KCVO) in 2005 for his services as Clerk of the Closet.

In retirement he served as an honorary assistant bishop in the Diocese of Gloucester, an independent member of the Gloucestershire Police Authority and an honorary foundation fellow of the University of Gloucestershire.

== Personal life and death ==
In 1965, he married Susan Bennett-Jones (who was also ordained in 1994) and they had three sons.

After retirement he was diagnosed with cancer, of which he died on 9 December 2008.

Church of England titles
Preceded by Eric Devenport	Bishop of Dunwich; 1992–1995	Succeeded by Tim Stevens
Preceded by Peter Dawes	Bishop of Derby; 1995–2005	Succeeded by Alastair Redfern
Preceded by John Waine	Clerk of the Closet; 1997–2005	Succeeded by Christopher Hill
