= Anthony Rawlinson =

Sir Anthony Keith Rawlinson
- Born: 5 March 1926
- Died: 22 February 1986 (aged 59)
- Education: Christ Church, Oxford
- Known for: Permanent Secretary to Department of Trade and Industry (1983-1985), President of the Alpine Club (1986)
- Father: Alfred Rawlinson
- Honours: KCB

Sir Anthony Keith Rawlinson, KCB (5 March 1926 – 22 February 1986) was a British civil servant, who held executive positions variously in the departments of the Treasury, Industry, and Trade, served with the IMF, and with the British Embassy to the United States. He was the president of the Alpine Club when he died in a fall on Mt. Snowdon in Wales.

== Biography ==
Born on 5 March 1926, Rawlinson studied at Eton College and Christ Church, Oxford, before service in the Grenadier Guards from 1944 to 1947. He then entered HM Civil Service and spent many years in HM Treasury. From 1972 to 1975, he was the UK's executive director at the IMF and the economic minister at the British Embassy in the US. He was then appointed a Deputy Secretary in the Department of Industry; after serving briefly as Second Permanent Secretary there from 1976 to 1977, he moved to the Treasury, where he was Second Permanent Secretary (with responsibility for public expenditure) from 1977 to 1983.

Rawlinson was then briefly Permanent Secretary of the Department of Trade in 1983, before it was merged to form the Department of Trade and Industry, where he was jointly Permanent Secretary until 1985. There, he was responsible for competition policy and negotiating with the London Stock Exchange over regulations which ultimately abolished the distinction between the stockjobber and the stockbroker, a key part of the government's reforms of the City. He was then chairman of the Gaming Board for Great Britain until he died after a fall while climbing Mount Snowdon in Wales on 22 February 1986.

An avid climber, whilst an undergraduate he became President of the Oxford University Mountaineering Club and he was selected as one of the four reserves for the 1953 expedition to Mount Everest. Although he never visited the Himalaya he was later elected president of the Alpine Club and stepped into that role in January 1986, very shortly before his death.
