= Francis Johnston (bishop) =

Third Bishop of Egypt

Francis Featherstonhaugh Johnston CBE was the third Bishop of Egypt from 1952 until 1958. Johnston served continuously in the Middle East from 1916 to 1957.

Born on 21 April 1891 and educated at Reigate Grammar School and Hatfield College, Durham, he was ordained in 1915. After a curacy at All Saints, Fishponds, Bristol he was a Temporary Chaplain to the Forces. He had been appointed in 1915 as one of the youngest TCFs:the Chaplain-General described him as 'young, strong, bright personality'. He served in France, Salonica and then Palestine

After World War I he was Chaplain of Port Said and then Archdeacon of Egypt before his elevation to the episcopate. During World War 2, he was praised for his ministry to British troops in Cairo and appointed a CBE

With the coming of the Suez Crisis and the heightened tension between Britain and Egypt that it brought, Johnston found himself expelled from the country 'virtually with the garments he was wearing'. He hoped to resume his pastoral duties in Egypt as soon as he was given permission to re-enter, but this authority never came. On resigning his see he was Vicar of Ewshot in the Diocese of Guildford until his death on 17 September 1963 after he collapsed preaching at a Battle of Arnhem commemoration service.

Anglican Communion titles
Preceded by Geoffrey Francis Allen	Bishop of Egypt; 1952–1958	Suspended Title next held by Kenneth Cragg
