= Alfred Rawlinson (bishop) =

British divinity scholar, Anglican bishop (1884–1960)

- Bishop of Derby
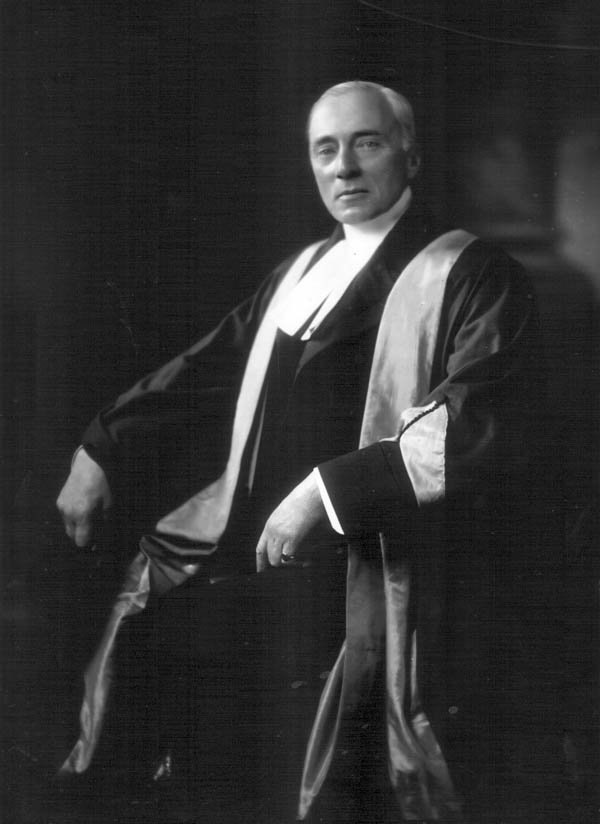
- Rawlinson in 1922
- Church: Anglican
- Diocese: Diocese of Derby
- In office: 1936–1959
- Predecessor: Edmund Pearce
- Successor: Geoffrey Allen
- Other posts: Archdeacon of Auckland, Canon of Durham, & bishop's examining chaplain (1929–1936)

Orders
- Ordination: 1909 (deacon); 1910 (priest)
- Consecration: 1936 by Cosmo Gordon Lang

Personal details
- Born: 17 July 1884 Newton-le-Willows, Lancashire, United Kingdom
- Died: 17 July 1960 (aged 76) London, England
- Buried: 17 September 1960, Derby Cathedral (ashes interred)
- Denomination: Anglican
- Residence: Golders Green, London (in retirement)
- Spouse: Mildred née Ellis (m. 1919)
- Children: 1, Anthony Rawlinson
- Profession: Divinity scholar
- Education: Corpus Christi College, Oxford

Alfred Edward John Rawlinson (called Jack; 17 July 1884 – 17 July 1960) was an eminent British scholar of divinity and an Anglican bishop. He was the second Bishop of Derby (a diocesan bishop in the Church of England) from 1936 until his retirement in 1959.

== Biography ==
Born at Newton-le-Willows, Lancashire and educated at Dulwich College and Corpus Christi College, Oxford, he was ordained a deacon in 1909 and a priest in 1910. He married Mildred, oldest daughter of P. A. Ellis (sometime Vicar of St Mary-the-Virgin, Tothill Fields), and they had one son.

His academic career began as a tutor at Keble College, Oxford (1909–1913). Further academic posts at Christ Church, Oxford and Corpus followed: he was a Student (the Christ Church equivalent of a Fellow at other colleges) and Tutor at Christ Church from 1914 to 1929, and assistant chaplain and college lecturer in divinity at Corpus Christi from 1920 to 1929. He was also a university lecturer in divinity studies from 1927 to 1929.

Meanwhile, his priestly ministry included examining chaplain to John Kempthorne, Bishop of Lichfield (1913–1929) and a brief spell as priest-in-charge of St John the Evangelist, Wilton Road (Victoria, London; 1917–1918). He was a Temporary Chaplain to the Forces 1915-17, and was posted to King George Hospital for soldiers in London. He would later write of his experiences in ‘Religious Reality’. Its introduction, by the Bishop of Lichfield, noted that Rawlinson was ‘The sort of man with whom men are not afraid to talk’, referring to his work in preparing officers and men in military hospitals for Confirmation.

He was appointed a Chaplain to the King (George V; 1930–1936) and departed Oxford to become Archdeacon of Auckland, a Canon Residentiary of Durham Cathedral, and examining chaplain to Hensley Henson, Bishop of Durham (all 1929–1936), before his election to the See of Derby. He was consecrated a bishop by Cosmo Gordon Lang, Archbishop of Canterbury, on St Matthias' day (24 February) 1936 at St Paul's Cathedral. As an outstandingly biblical scholar, Rawlinson’s name appeared for several more senior bishoprics and, although he had the support of successive archbishops, his name was not forwarded to the Crown with the Prime Minister’s recommendation for appointment. The Prime Minister was the key figure in such appointments and Rawlinson was considered for vacancies at London in 1939, Bath and Wells in 1945 and Lincoln and Salisbury in 1946. The problem was that although Rawlinson’s academic prowess was greatly admired, his personal relationships, especially with his clergy, caused considerable concern. In 1945, for example, in recommending Rawlinson for Bath and Wells, Archbishop Geoffrey Fisher justified the translation because of Rawlinson’s reputation in Derby. ‘He dislikes his own Diocese and I don’t think they like him’. Successive Prime Ministers refused to risk making an unpopular appointment. He retired to Golders Green in 1959 and died at a London hospital. His ashes were interred in Derby Cathedral at a memorial service on 17 September 1960.

== Works ==
=== Monographs ===
- Dogma, Fact, and Experience (1915)
- Religious Reality: A Book for Men London: Longmans, Green & Co (1918)
- Catholicism with freedom : an appeal for a new policy / being a paper read at the Anglo-Catholic congress at Birmingham on 22 June 1922; and now addressed as an open letter to all members of the Church of England ... London: Longmans (1922)
- Adventures in the Near East, 1918–1922 London: Melrose. Attr. King's College London (1924)
- Authority and freedom: Bishop Paddock Lectures. 1923 London, Longmans, Green (1924)
- St Mark (Westminster commentaries series) London: Methuen (1925)
- The New Testament Doctrine of the Christ Bampton Lectures London; New York: Longmans, Green (1926)
- Christ in the Gospels Oxford: Oxford University Press (1944)
- The Anglican Communion in Christendom London: SPCK (1960).

=== Contributor to ===
- Foundations: A Statement of Christian Belief in Terms of Modern Thought: By Seven Oxford Men. London: Macmillan (1912)
- Essays Catholic and Critical edited by E G Selwyn London: SPCK (1926)
- Essays on the Trinity and the Incarnation London: Longmans (1928)
- God and the World through Christian Eyes London: Student Christian Movement Press (1933)
- The Christian Faith: Essays in explanation and defence London: Eyre & Spottiswoode (1944).

Church of England titles
Preceded by Edmund Pearce	Bishop of Derby; 1936–1959	Succeeded by Geoffrey Allen
