= Ishaq Musaad =

Former Bishop of Egypt

Ishaq Musaad was Bishop of Egypt from 1974 to 1982.

He studied for the priesthood at St Aidan's College, Birkenhead and was ordained in 1954. After a curacy in Old Cairo he was Curate in charge at Giza until 1961. He was the Chaplain at Heliopolis from then until 1972 when he became Archdeacon in Egypt.
