= Ghais Malik =

Egyptian Anglican bishop

Ghais Abdel Malik (21 May 1930 – 2 March 2016) was an Egyptian Anglican bishop, born in Port Said.

== Career ==
He was the second Egyptian native Bishop of Egypt in the Episcopal Church in Jerusalem and the Middle East, from 1985 to 2000. He was President Bishop from 1995 to 2000. He consecrated the third and present All Saints Cathedral, in Cairo, on the Feast of St. Mark, on 25 April 1988.
