= All Saints' Cathedral, Cairo =

Anglican cathedral in Egypt

Coordinates: 30.0580°N 31.2237°E

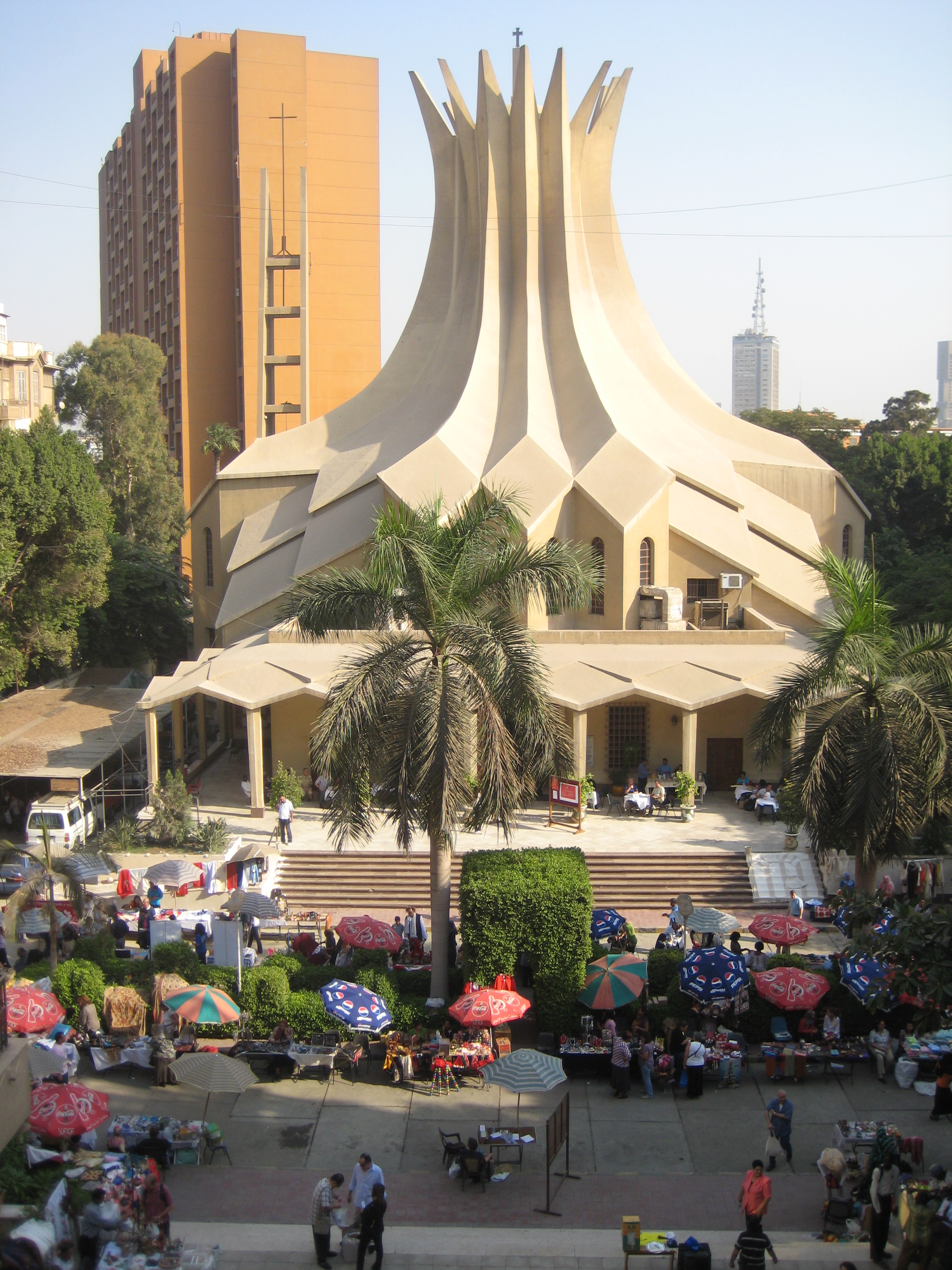
All Saints' Cathedral.

All Saints' Cathedral, Cairo was consecrated in 1988 and is the home of the Episcopal/Anglican Diocese of Egypt with North Africa and the Horn of Africa. The cathedral is located close to the Marriott Hotel in Zamalek, a residential area of the city that sits on an island in the middle of the River Nile. The building and land were donated by King Farouk.

The cathedral compound also houses the Diocesan and Bishop's offices and projects and services – including the Diocese NGO EpiscoCare and Refuge Egypt, which serves Cairo's refugee communities. The church hosts a variety of congregations – with Arabic and English congregations being the largest ones, although other communities also use the premises for worship.

The church is constructed in concrete and was designed in the shape of a cross at ground level and a crown at the top. Its roof is visible around Zamalek and was described by the Cairo Observer as reminiscent of a lotus flower. It was designed by Egyptian architects Dr. Awad Kamel and Selim Kamel, who also created the design for Cairo's Saint Mark's Coptic Orthodox Cathedral (Cathedral of Abbasiya).

The first All Saints' in Cairo was completed in 1878. The second opened in 1938 and was sited overlooking the Nile and behind the Egyptian Museum. Designed by Adrian Gilbert Scott (grandson of Sir George Gilbert Scott), it was demolished 40 years later to make way for the 6 October Bridge.

== See also ==
- Christianity in Egypt

== External sources ==
- Diocese of Egypt
- Cathedral of Cairo blogspot
- Pictures of All Saints' Cathedral
